= 1998 =

1998 in various calendars
- Gregorian calendar: 1998; MCMXCVIII
- Ab urbe condita: 2751
- Armenian calendar: 1447; ԹՎ ՌՆԽԷ
- Assyrian calendar: 6748
- Baháʼí calendar: 154–155
- Balinese saka calendar: 1919–1920
- Bengali calendar: 1404–1405
- Berber calendar: 2948
- British Regnal year: 46 Eliz. 2 – 47 Eliz. 2
- Buddhist calendar: 2542
- Burmese calendar: 1360
- Byzantine calendar: 7506–7507
- Chinese calendar: 丁丑年 (Fire Ox); 4695 or 4488 — to — 戊寅年 (Earth Tiger); 4696 or 4489
- Coptic calendar: 1714–1715
- Discordian calendar: 3164
- Ethiopian calendar: 1990–1991
- Hebrew calendar: 5758–5759
- Hindu calendars
- Vikram Samvat: 2054–2055
- Shaka Samvat: 1919–1920
- Kali Yuga: 5098–5099
- Holocene calendar: 11998
- Igbo calendar: 998–999
- Iranian calendar: 1376–1377
- Islamic calendar: 1418–1419
- Japanese calendar: Heisei 10 (平成１０年)
- Javanese calendar: 1930–1931
- Juche calendar: 87
- Julian calendar: Gregorian minus 13 days
- Korean calendar: 4331
- Minguo calendar: ROC 87 民國87年
- Nanakshahi calendar: 530
- Thai solar calendar: 2541
- Tibetan calendar: མེ་མོ་གླང་ལོ་ (female Fire-Ox); 2124 or 1743 or 971 — to — ས་ཕོ་སྟག་ལོ་ (male Earth-Tiger); 2125 or 1744 or 972
- Unix time: 883612800 – 915148799

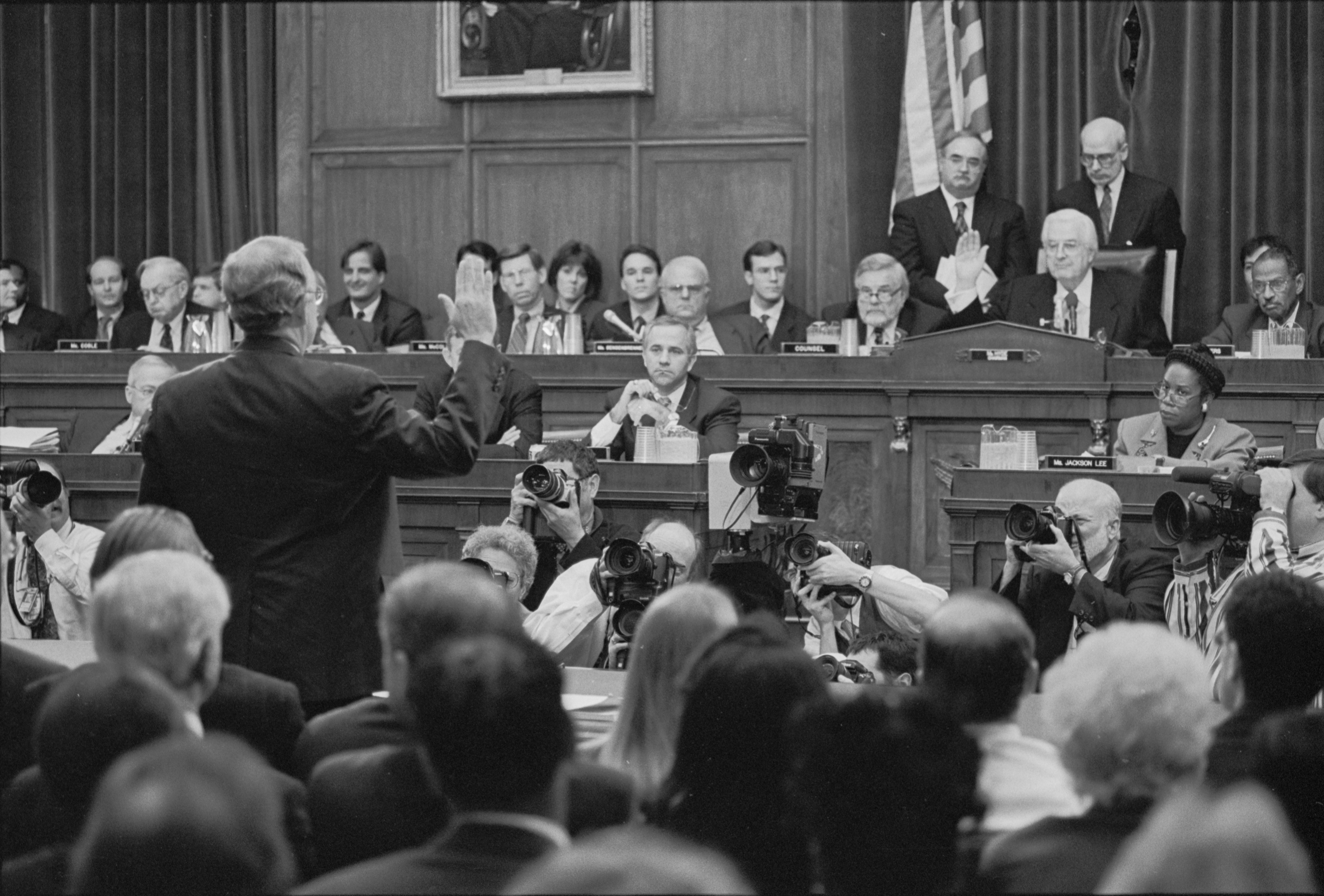
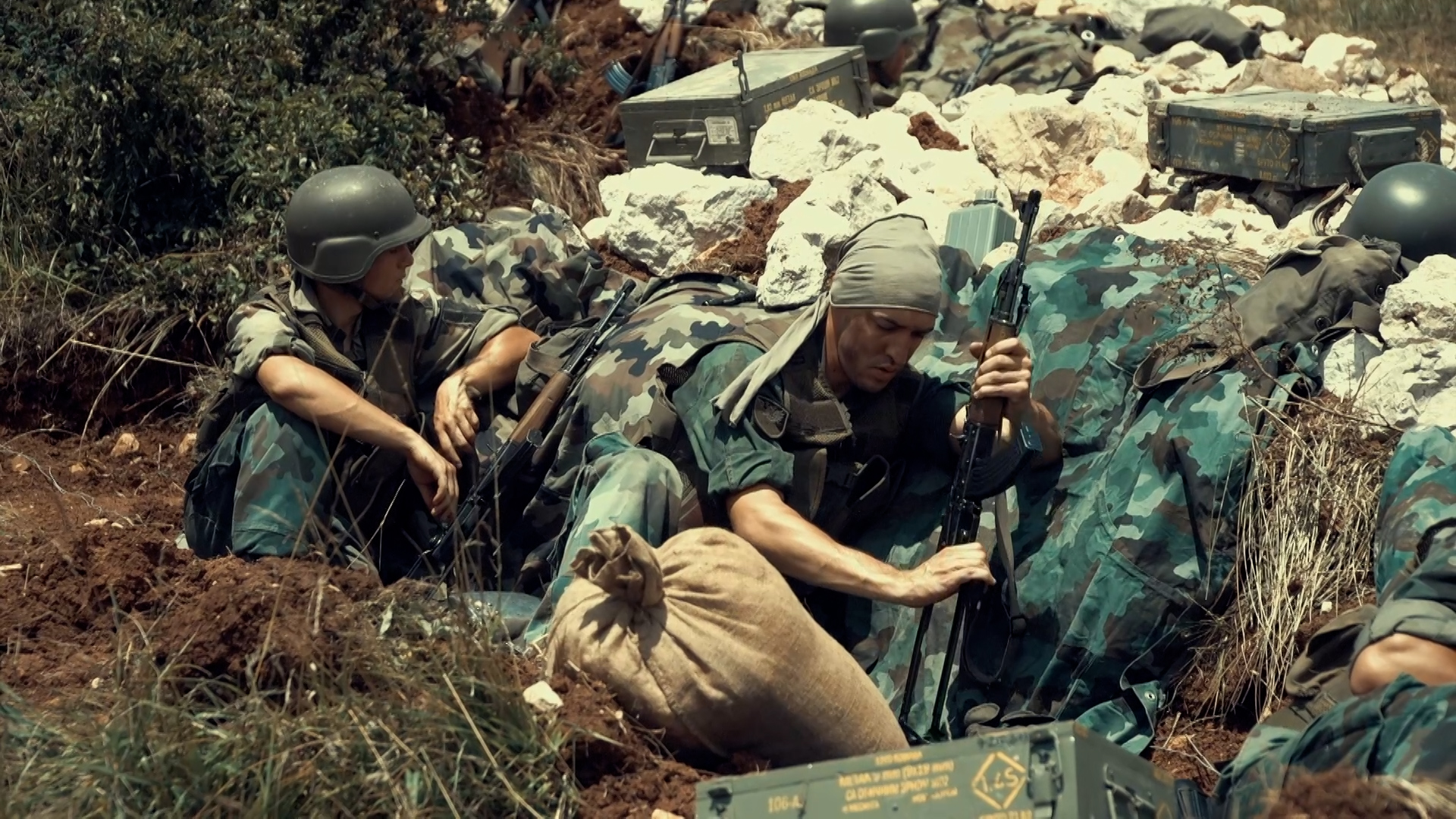
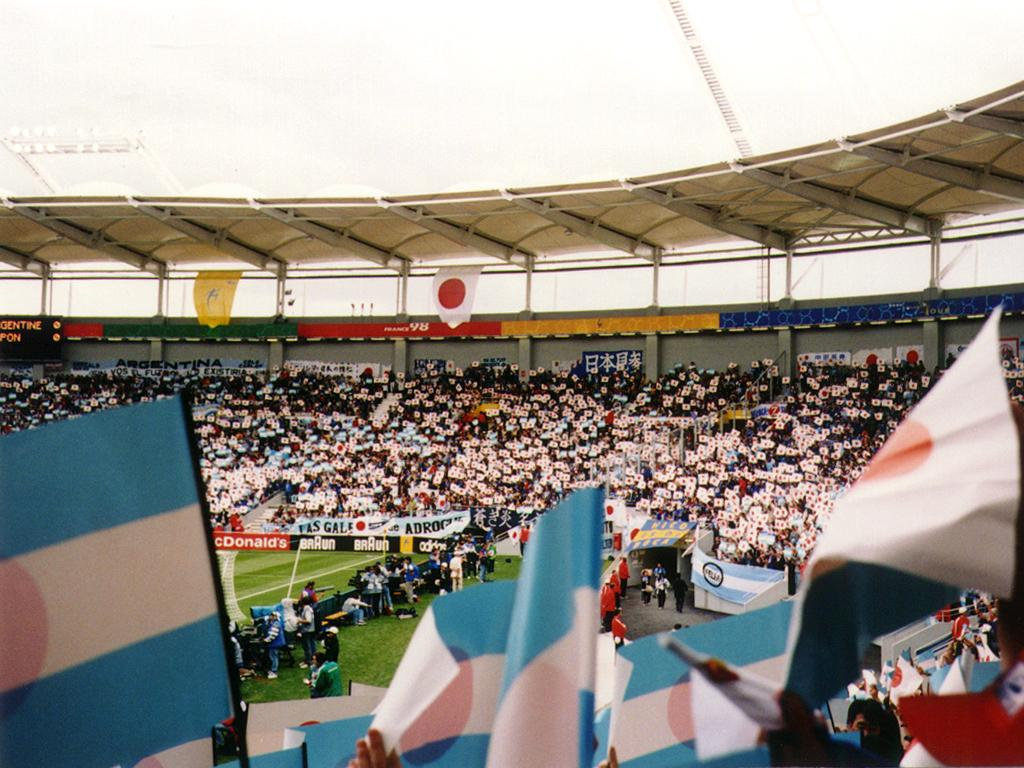
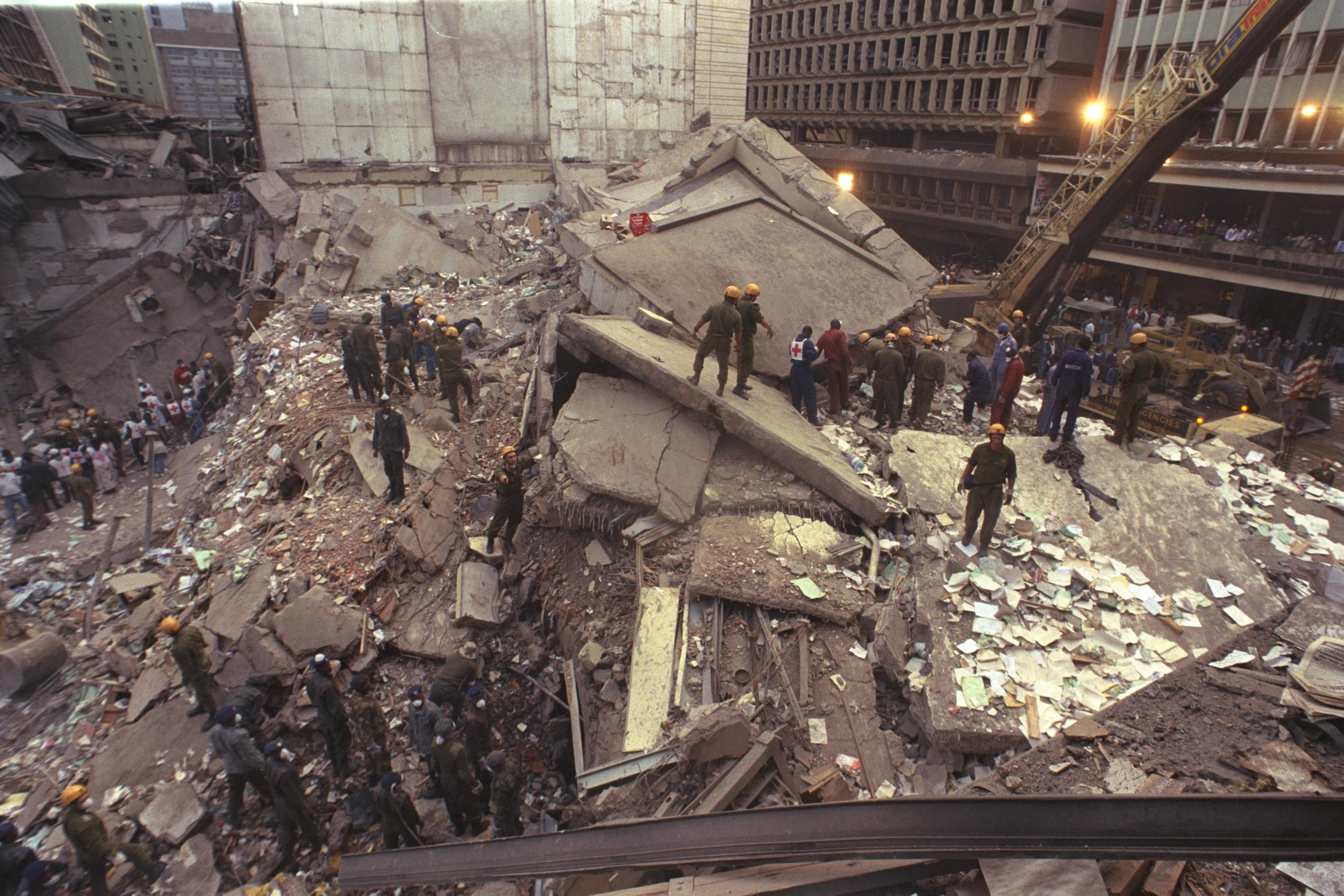
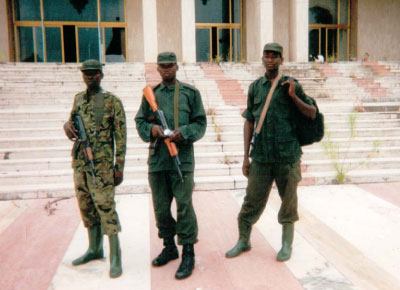
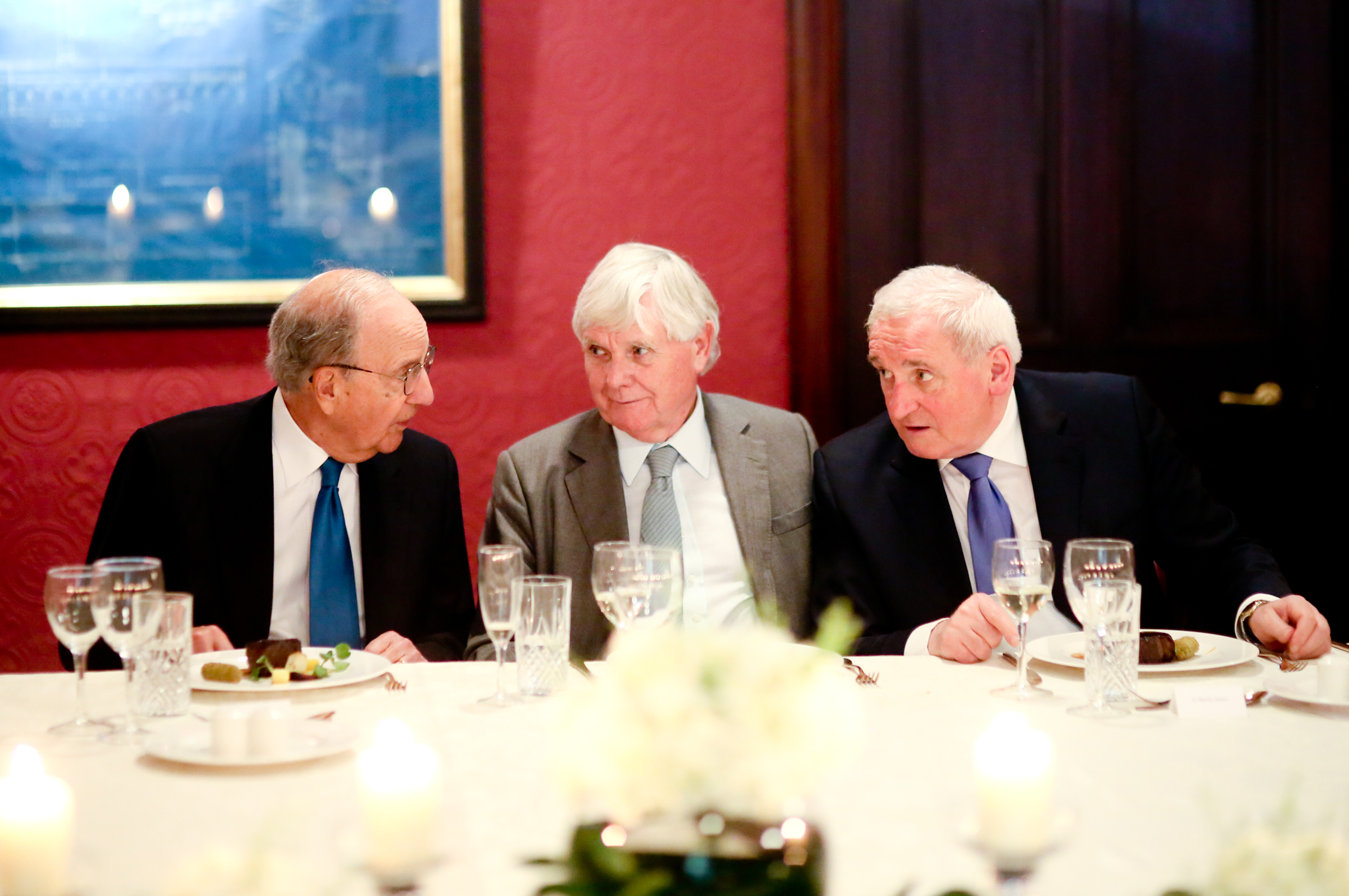
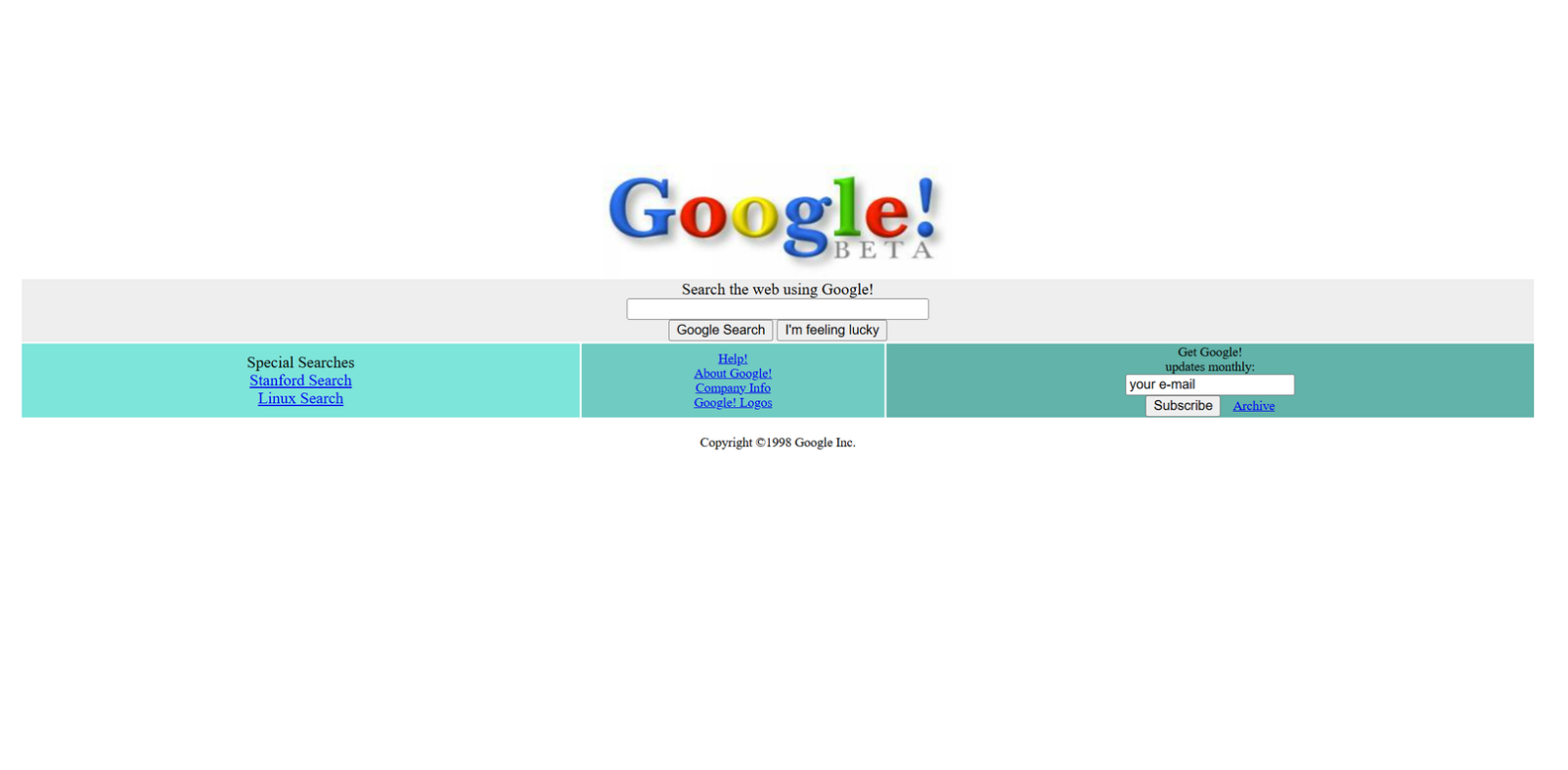
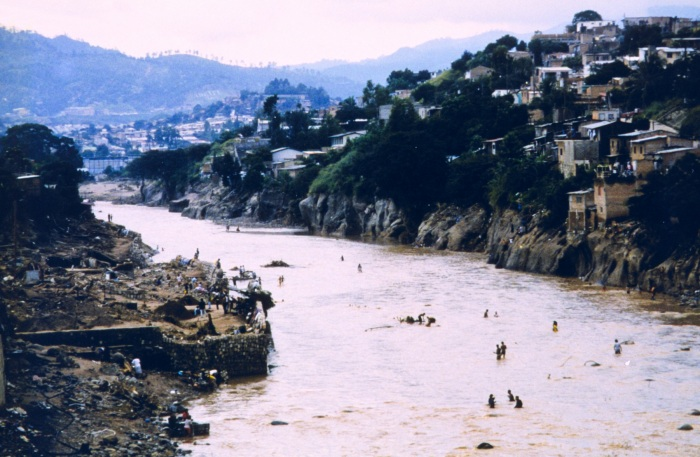
From top to bottom, left to right: Bill Clinton is impeached after the Clinton–Lewinsky scandal; the Kosovo War begins as tensions escalate between Yugoslav forces and ethnic Albanian separatists; the 1998 FIFA World Cup is held in France, with the host nation emerging as champions; the 1998 United States embassy bombings in Dar es Salaam and Nariobi kill over 200 people and injure 4,000, in retaliation, the United States launched strikes on Afghanistan and Sudan; the Second Congo War in Africa begins, becoming the deadliest conflict since World War II; the Good Friday Agreement is signed, bringing a major step toward peace in Northern Ireland; Google is founded, ushering in a transformative era for internet search; Hurricane Mitch devastates Central America, killing over 11,000 people; and Frank Sinatra dies, marking the loss of one of the 20th century's most iconic entertainers.

1998 (MCMXCVIII) was a common year starting on Thursday of the Gregorian calendar, the 1998th year of the Common Era (CE) and Anno Domini (AD) designations, the 998th year of the 2nd millennium, the 98th year of the 20th century, and the 9th year of the 1990s decade.

1998 was designated as the International Year of the Ocean.

== Events ==
=== January ===
- January 11-12 – Over 100 people are killed in the Sidi-Hamed massacre in Algeria.
- January 12 – Nineteen European nations agree to forbid human cloning.
- January 15 – U.N. peacekeepers return Eastern Slavonia to Croatian control; 80,000 displaced Croatians begin returning home, while 60,000 Serbs begin vacating the region. The area will remain under UNPSG supervision until October.
- January 17 – The Drudge Report breaks the story about U.S. President Bill Clinton's alleged affair with Monica Lewinsky, which will lead to the House of Representatives' impeachment of him.
- January 21 - Pope John Paul II begins a 5-day visit to Cuba; Fidel Castro releases 300 political prisoners in a gesture of goodwill.

=== February ===
The current flag of the Philippines, adopted on 12 February 1998

- February 2 - Cebu Pacific Flight 387 crashes into a mountain, this crash marked deadliest aviation accident in Philippines until 2000.
- February 3 – Cavalese cable car disaster: A United States military pilot causes the deaths of 20 people near Trento, Italy, when his low-flying EA-6B Prowler severs the cable of a cable-car.
- February 4 – Western Pacific, a low-cost airline with headquarters at Colorado Springs Airport, ceases operations.
- February 7–22 – The 1998 Winter Olympics are held in Nagano, Japan.
- February 20
  - Iraq disarmament crisis: Iraqi President Saddam Hussein negotiates a deal with U.N. Secretary General Kofi Annan, allowing weapons inspectors to return to Baghdad, preventing military action by the United States and United Kingdom.
  - Rudy Giuliani kicks off his "quality of life" campaign in New York City, focused on increasing civility and reducing nuisances like littering and reckless driving.
  - The Nashville Banner publishes its last issue; the newspaper ceases operation after 122 years.
- February 21 – King Hussein of Jordan imposes martial law in Ma'an to quell growing pro-Iraqi demonstrations.
- February 25 – Alaska v. Native Village of Venetie Tribal Government: The SCOTUS rules against the Neets'aii Gwich'in Indian nation, who had been levying taxes on non-natives in order to fund a local airstrip; the Court ruled that only the federal and state governments may collect taxes.
- February 28
  - A massacre in Likoshane, FR Yugoslavia starts the Kosovo War.
  - A study led by Andrew Wakefield is published in The Lancet suggesting an alleged link between MMR vaccine and autism. Now known to be full of data manipulation, the study was instantly controversial and fueled the nascent anti-vaccination movement. Although subsequent large epidemiological research found no link between vaccines and autism, the study contributed – in the following years and decades – to a sharp drop in vaccination rates and the resurgence of measles in several countries. The study, fully retracted in 2010, was later characterised as "perhaps the most damaging medical hoax of the 20th Century".

=== March ===
- March 2 – Data sent from the Galileo probe indicates that Jupiter's moon Europa has a liquid ocean under a thick crust of ice.
- March 5 – NASA announces that the Clementine probe orbiting the Moon has found enough water in polar craters to support a human colony and rocket fueling station.
- March 11 – 1998 Danish general election: Prime Minister Poul Nyrup Rasmussen is re-elected.
- March 13 – The High-Z Supernova Search Team becomes the first research team to publish evidence that the universe is expanding at an accelerating rate.
- March 21 – The European Union announces an arms embargo against Serbia and Montenegro.
- March 23 – The 70th Academy Awards ceremony, hosted for the 6th time by Billy Crystal, is held at the Shrine Auditorium in Los Angeles, California. Titanic wins 11 Oscars including Best Picture.
- March 26 – Oued Bouaicha massacre in Algeria: 52 people are killed with axes and knives; 32 of the killed are babies under the age of two.

=== April ===
- April 5 – In Japan, the Akashi Kaikyō Bridge linking Shikoku with Honshū and costing about US$3.6 billion, opens to traffic, becoming the largest suspension bridge in the world.
- April 10 – Good Friday Agreement: An hour after the end of the talks deadline, the Belfast Agreement is signed between the Irish and British governments and most Northern Ireland political parties, with the notable exception of the Democratic Unionist Party. This would mostly put an end to the conflict known as The Troubles.
- April 20 – The alleged date the German Red Army Faction (created 1970) is dissolved.
- April 23 – The Yugoslav Army ambushes a group of Kosovo Liberation Army fighters attempting to smuggle weapons from Albania into Kosovo, killing 19.

=== May ===
- May 11
  - Pokhran-II (Operation Shakti): India conducts three underground nuclear tests in Pokhran, including one thermonuclear device.
  - The first euro coins are minted in Pessac, France. Because the final specifications for the coins are not finished, they will have to be melted and minted again in 1999.
- May 13–14 – Riots directed against Chinese Indonesians break out in Indonesia, killing around 1,000 people. Maria Catarina Sumarsih holds Prabowo Subianto the responsibility for being involved in a series of human rights abuses during the riot.
- May 19
  - The Galaxy IV communications satellite fails, leaving 80–90% of the US's pagers without service.
  - The wreck of the aircraft carrier USS Yorktown, sunk during the Battle of Midway in 1942, is found near Midway Atoll by a team led by former US Navy officer Robert D. Ballard.
- May 21 – Suharto (elected 1967) resigns after 31 years as President of Indonesia, effectively ending the New Order period. It is his 7th consecutive re-election by the Indonesian Parliament (MPR). Suharto's hand-picked Vice President, B. J. Habibie, becomes Indonesia's third president.
- May 28 – Nuclear testing: In response to a series of Indian nuclear tests, Pakistan explodes five nuclear devices of its own in the Chagai hills of Baluchistan, codenamed Chagai-I, prompting the United States, Japan and other nations to impose economic sanctions. Pakistan celebrates Youm-e-Takbir annually.
- May 30
  - A 6.5 magnitude earthquake hits northern Afghanistan, killing up to 5,000.
  - A second nuclear test, codenamed Chagai-II, is conducted and supervised by the Pakistan Atomic Energy Commission (PAEC).

=== June ===
- June 1 – The European Central Bank is established, replacing the European Monetary Institute.
- June 3 – Eschede train disaster: an Intercity-Express high-speed train derails between Hanover and Hamburg, Germany, causing 101 deaths.
- June 7 – Former Brigadier-General Ansumane Mané seizes control over military barracks in Bissau, marking the beginning of the Guinea-Bissau Civil War (1998–99).
- June 10–July 12 – The 1998 FIFA World Cup in France: France beats Brazil 3–0 in the FIFA World Cup Final.
- June 10 – The Organisation of African Unity passes a resolution which states that its members will no longer comply with punitive sanctions applied by the UN Security Council against Libya.
- June 27 – Kuala Lumpur International Airport officially opens, becoming the new international gateway into Malaysia.
- June 30 – Philippine Vice President Joseph Estrada is sworn in as the 13th President of the Philippines.

=== July ===
- July 5 – Japan launches the probe Nozomi to Mars, joining the United States and Russia as an outer space-exploring nation.
- July 17
  - Rome Statute: at a conference in Rome, 120 countries vote to create a permanent International Criminal Court to prosecute individuals for genocide, crimes against humanity, war crimes, and the crime of aggression.
  - In Saint Petersburg, Nicholas II of Russia and his family are buried in St. Catherine Chapel, 80 years after he and his family were killed by the Bolsheviks in 1918.
  - The 7.0 M_{w} Papua New Guinea earthquake shakes the region near Aitape with a maximum Mercalli intensity of VIII (Severe). This submarine earthquake triggered a landslide that caused a destructive tsunami, leaving more than 2,100 dead and thousands injured.
- July 21–September 5 – 1998 Sydney water crisis: suspected contamination by the microscopic pathogens cryptosporidium and giardia of the water supply system of Greater Metropolitan Sydney, Australia.
- July 24 – Russell Eugene Weston Jr. enters the United States Capitol Building and opens fire, killing two members of the United States Capitol Police, Jacob Chestnut and John Gibson.

=== August ===
- August 1 – Puntland State leaders in Somalia declare the territory an autonomous state; the capital is the city of Garoowe in the Nugal region.
- August 4 – The Second Congo War begins; 5.4 million people die before it ends in 2003, making it the bloodiest war, to date, since World War II.
- August 7
  - Yangtze River Floods: in China the Yangtze river breaks through the main bank; before this, from August 1–5, peripheral levees collapsed consecutively in Jiayu County Baizhou Bay. The death toll exceeds 12,000, with many thousands more injured.
  - 1998 U.S. embassy bombings: the bombings of the United States embassies in Dar es Salaam, Tanzania, and Nairobi, Kenya, kill 224 people and injure over 4,500; they are linked to terrorist Osama bin Laden, an exile of Saudi Arabia.
- August 15 – The Troubles: The Omagh bombing is carried out in Northern Ireland by the Real Irish Republican Army as a reaction to the Good Friday Agreement. 29 people are killed and 220 are injured. Shortly after these events, the group will call a ceasefire in response, signaling an end to the 30+ year conflict.
- August 17 – Russia's government devalues the ruble, defaults on domestic debt, and declares a moratorium on repayment of foreign debt. This marks the beginning of 1998 Russian financial crisis.

=== September ===
- September 2
  - A McDonnell Douglas MD-11 airliner (Swissair Flight 111) crashes near Peggy's Cove, Nova Scotia, after taking off from New York City en route to Geneva; all 229 people on board are killed.
  - A United Nations court finds Jean-Paul Akayesu, the former mayor of a small town in Rwanda, guilty of nine counts of genocide, marking the first time that the 1948 law banning genocide is enforced.
- September 3 — Khoua Her strangles all six of her children in Saint Paul, Minnesota.
- September 4 – Google, Inc. is founded in Menlo Park, California, by Stanford University PhD candidates Larry Page and Sergey Brin.
- September 5 – The Government of North Korea adopts a military dictatorship on its 50th anniversary. The constitution is amended, and the late Kim Il Sung is enshrined as the eternal President.
- September 10 – At midnight, a shooting occurs aboard an Akula-class nuclear-powered attack submarine of the Russian Navy docked in the northern Russian port city of Severomorsk.
- September 12 – The Cuban Five intelligence agents are arrested in Miami, and later convicted of espionage. The agents claim they were not spying against the United States Government but against the Cuban exile community in Miami.
- September 17 – Basque conflict: Basque Homeland and Liberty reaches a ceasefire agreement with the government of Spain, the second such agreement in two years.
- September 24 – Iranian President Mohammad Khatami retracts a fatwa against Satanic Verses author Salman Rushdie that was in force since 1989 stating that the Iranian government will "neither support nor hinder assassination operations on Rushdie".
- September 25 – Benoit Lecomte finishes his 72-day swim across the Atlantic Ocean, but uncertainty over the exact route and distance covered prevent him from being recognized as the first person to swim across the Atlantic.
- September 25–28 – Major creditors of Long-Term Capital Management, a Greenwich, Connecticut-based hedge fund, after days of tough bargaining and some informal mediation by Federal Reserve officials, agree on terms of a re-capitalization to avoid a wider collapse in financial markets.

=== October ===
- October 1 – Europol is established when the Europol Convention signed by all of its member states comes into force.
- October 3 – 1998 Australian federal election: John Howard's Liberal/National Coalition government is re-elected with a substantially reduced majority, defeating the Labor Party led by Kim Beazley.
- October 10 – Indictment and arrest of Augusto Pinochet: General Augusto Pinochet, Chilean dictator from 1973 to 1990, is indicted for human rights violations he committed in Chile by Spanish magistrate Baltasar Garzón. 6 days later British police place him under house arrest during his medical treatment in the UK. This is a leading case in the law of universal jurisdiction.
- October 17 – 1998 Jesse pipeline explosion: An oil pipeline explosion in Jesse, Nigeria, results in 1,082 deaths.

=== November ===
- November 3 – South Carolina voters repeal the state's 103-year-old constitutional ban on interracial marriage, making Alabama the last U.S. state with such a ban in place.
- November 17 – Voyager 1 overtakes Pioneer 10 as the most distant man-made object from the Solar System, at a distance of 69.419 AU (1.03849×10^{10} km).
- November 19 – Valve Corporation releases their first-person shooter video game Half-Life to critical acclaim. The game would be deemed one of the most influential titles of its genre, and one of the greatest video games of all time.
- November 20 – A Russian Proton rocket is launched from the Baikonur Cosmodrome in Kazakhstan, carrying the first segment of the International Space Station, the 21-ton Zarya Module.
- November 24 – A declassified report by Swiss International Olympic Committee official Marc Hodler reveals that bribes had been used to bring the 2002 Winter Olympics to Salt Lake City during bidding process in 1995. The IOC, the Salt Lake Organizing Committee, the United States Olympic Committee and the United States Department of Justice immediately launch an investigation into the scandal.

=== December ===
- December 1 – Ireland formally relinquishes its territorial claim over Northern Ireland and recognizes the United Kingdom's sovereignty there.
- December 4 – The Space Shuttle Endeavour launches the first U.S.-built component to the International Space Station, the 25,600 pounds (11,600 kg) Unity module on STS-88. It docks with Zarya two days later.
- December 6 – Hugo Chávez, politician and former officer of the Venezuelan army, is elected President of Venezuela.
- December 14 – The Yugoslav Army ambushes a column of 140 Kosovo Liberation Army militants attempting to smuggle arms from Albania into Kosovo, killing 36.
- December 16 – Iraq disarmament crisis: U.S. President Bill Clinton orders airstrikes on Iraq. UNSCOM withdraws all weapons inspectors from Iraq.
- December 19 – The U.S. House of Representatives forwards articles of impeachment against President Clinton to the Senate, making him the second president to be impeached in U.S. history.
- December 29 – The Khmer Rouge's leaders apologize for the post-Vietnam War genocide in Cambodia that killed more than one million people in the 1970s.
- December 31
  - The first leap second since June 30, 1997, occurs.
  - In the Eurozone, the currency rates of this day are fixed permanently.

=== Date unknown ===
- The European Small Business Alliance organization is formed.
- Ibrahim Hanna, the last native speaker of Mlahsô, dies in Qamishli, Syria, making the language effectively extinct. Also, the last native speaker of related Bijil Neo-Aramaic, Mrs. Rahel Avraham, dies in Jerusalem.

== Births ==
=== January ===
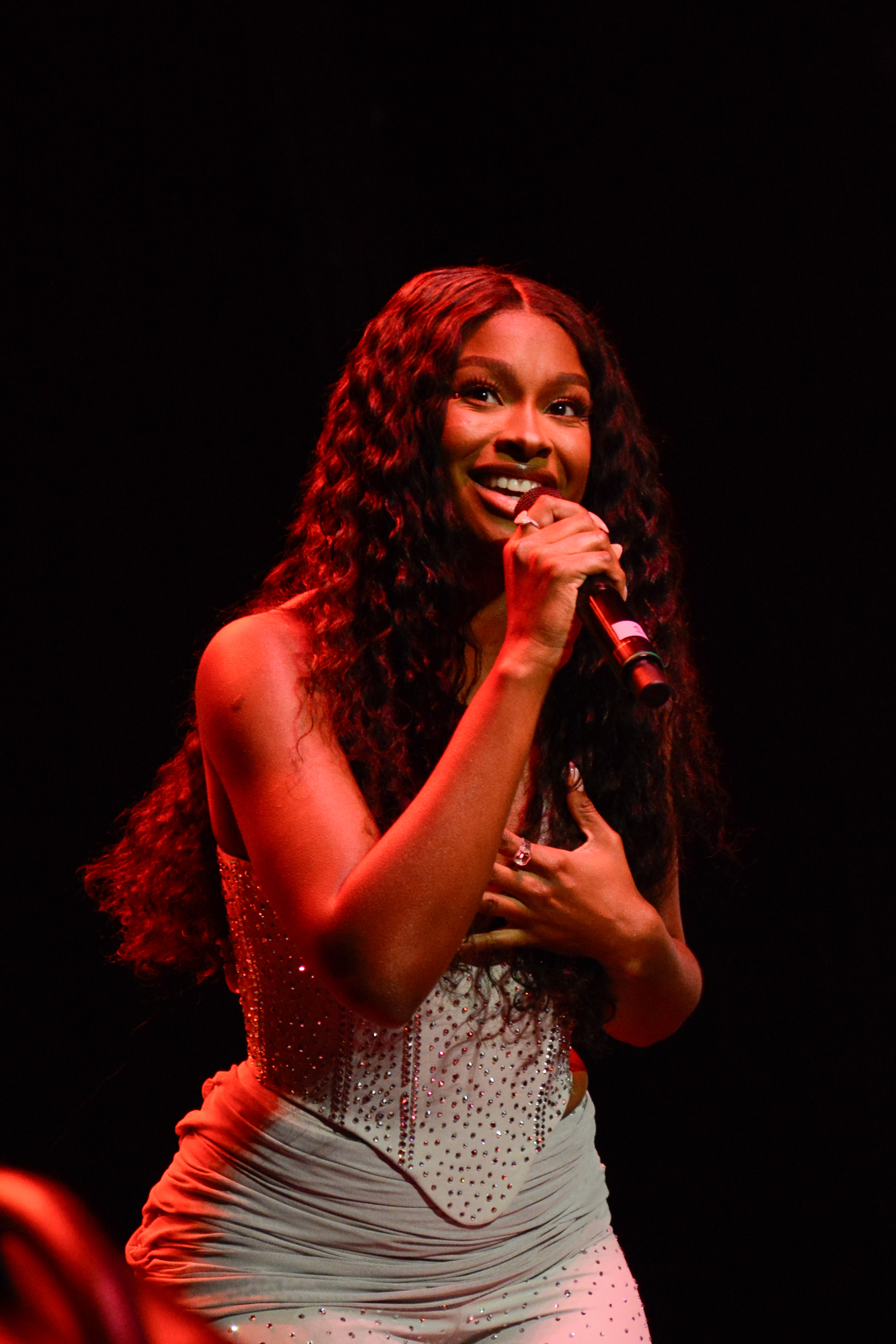
Coco Jones

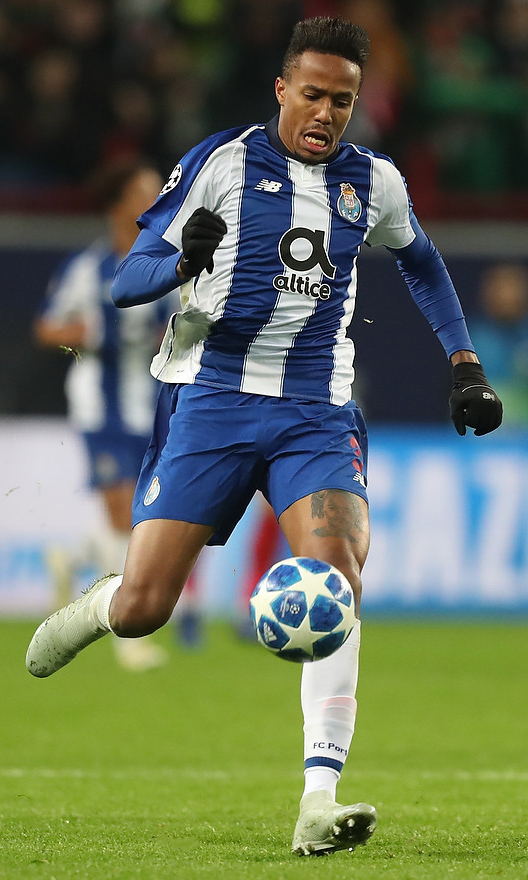
Éder Militão

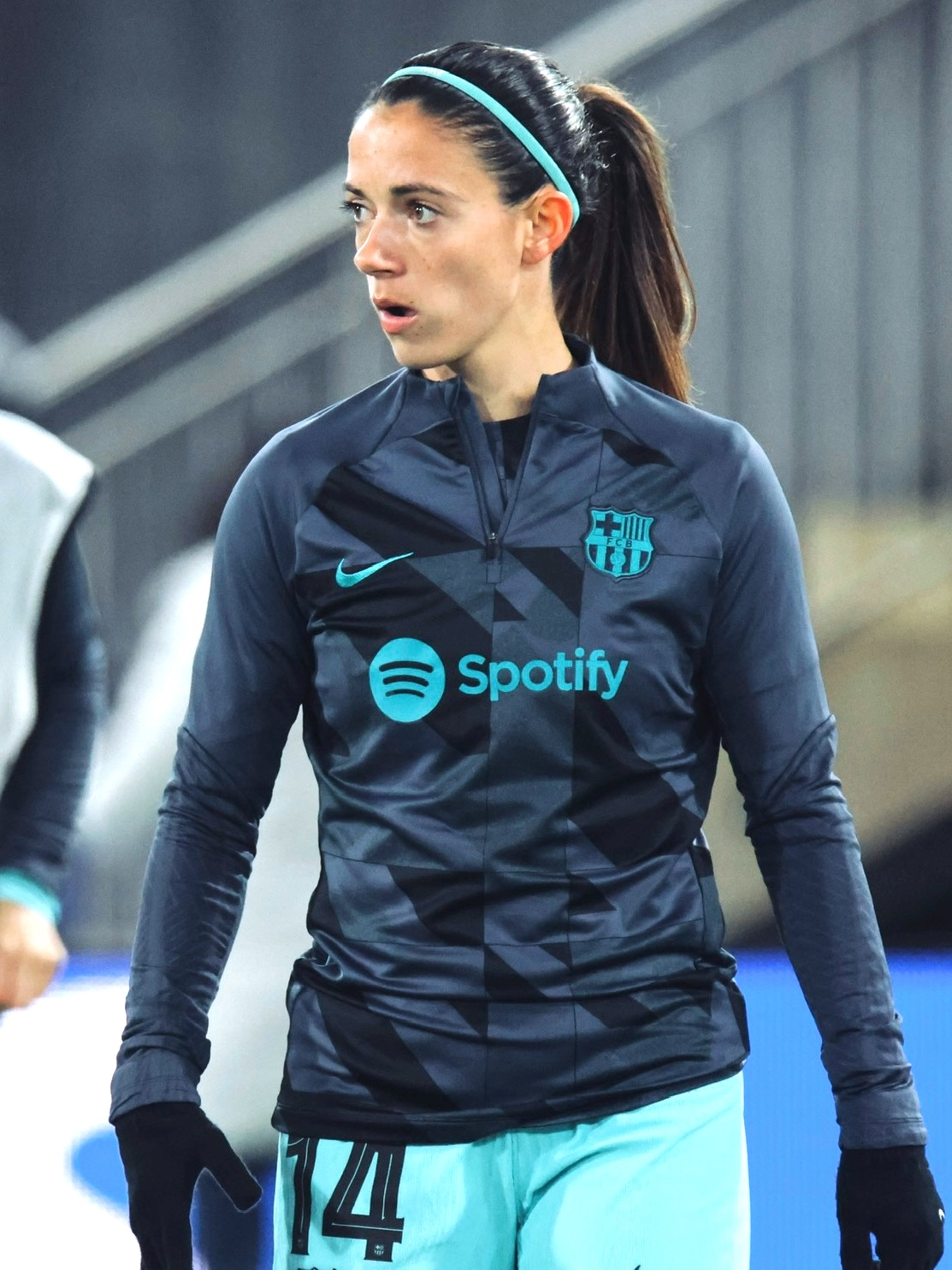
Aitana Bonmatí

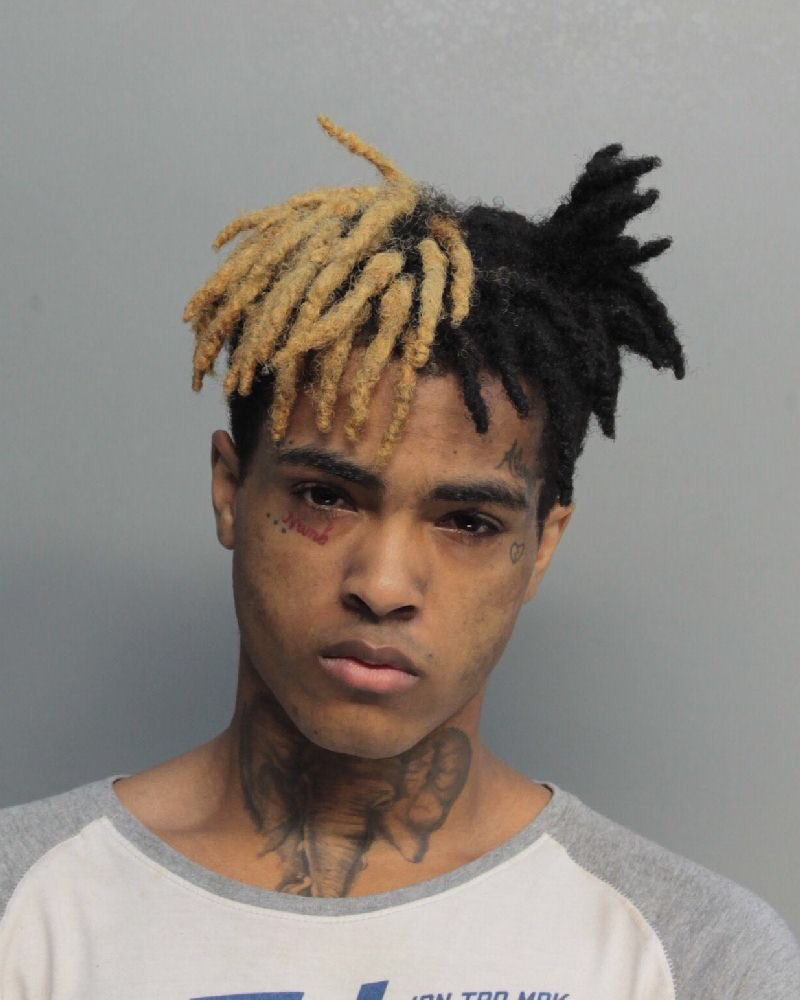
XXXTentacion

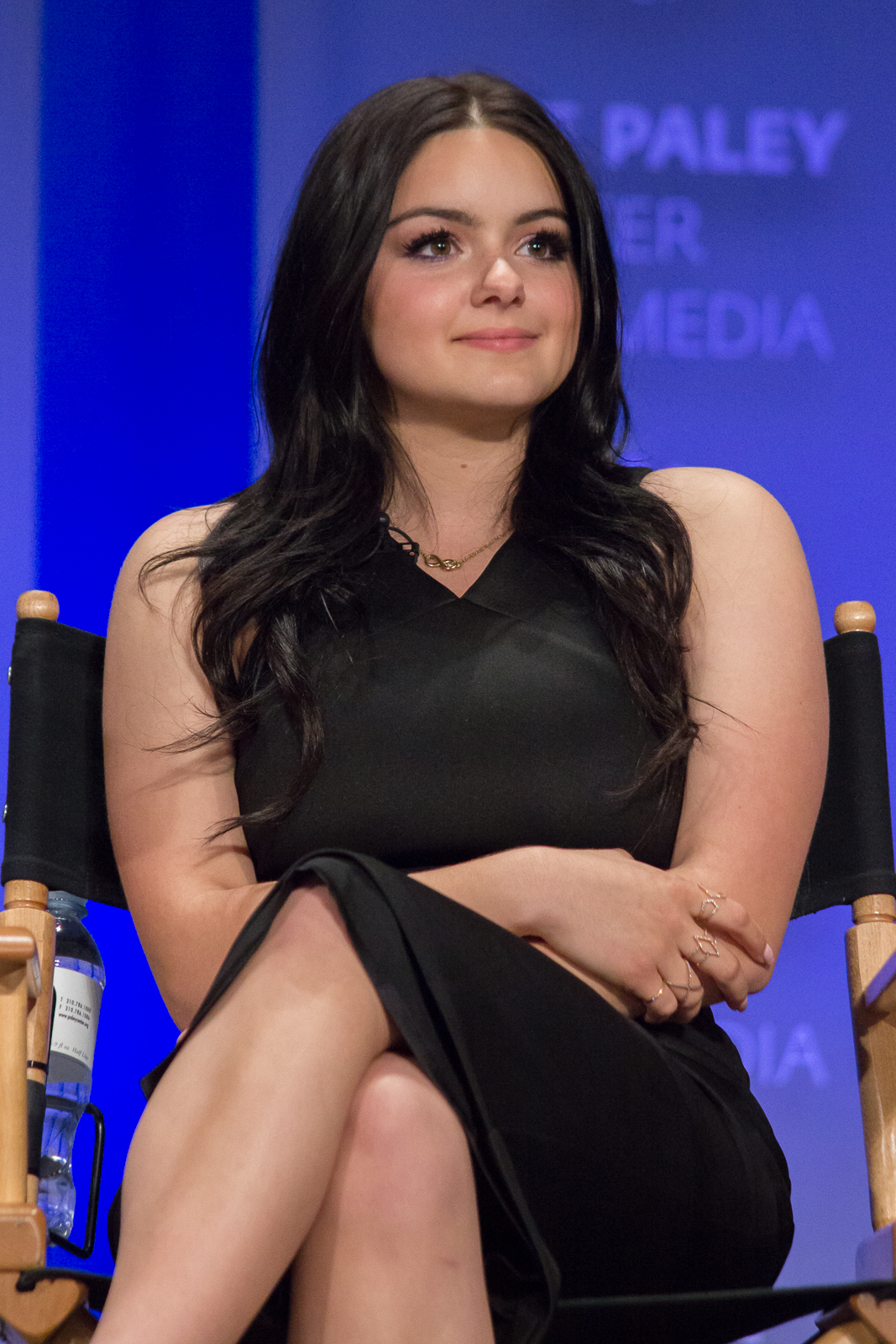
Ariel Winter

- January 1 – Sara Ahmed, Egyptian weightlifter
- January 2 – Junto Nakatani, Japanese professional boxer
- January 4
  - Coco Jones, American actress and singer
  - Liza Soberano, American actress
- January 7 – Yangel Herrera, Venezuelan footballer
- January 8
  - Manuel Locatelli, Italian footballer
  - Jonathon Cooper, American football linebacker
- January 11 –Salih Özcan, Turkish footballer
- January 13
  - Gabrielle Daleman, Canadian figure skater
  - Chris Nilsen, American athlete
- January 15 – Chloe Kelly, English footballer
- January 16 – Yerin Ha, Australian actress
- January 17
  - Anthony Zambrano, Colombian sprinter
  - Lovro Majer, Croatian footballer
  - Natalia Bukowiecka, Polish sprinter
- January 18
  - Vashti Cunningham, American track and field athlete
  - Aitana Bonmatí, Spanish footballer
  - Lisandro Martínez, Argentine footballer
  - Shin Ye-eun, South Korean actress and model
  - Byron Murphy, American football cornerback
- January 19 – Lily Donoghue, American actress
- January 20 – Frances Tiafoe, American tennis player
- January 21
  - Pervis Estupiñán, Ecuadorian footballer
  - Borna Sosa, Croatian footballer
- January 23 – XXXTentacion, American rapper (d. 2018)
- January 27 – Albina Kelmendi, Albanian-Kosovar singer and songwriter
- January 28
  - Ariel Winter, American actress and voice actress
  - Payton Pritchard, American basketball player
- January 29 – Jorge Martín, Spanish motorcycle racer
- January 31
  - Amadou Haidara, Malian footballer
  - Bradie Tennell, American figure skater

=== February ===
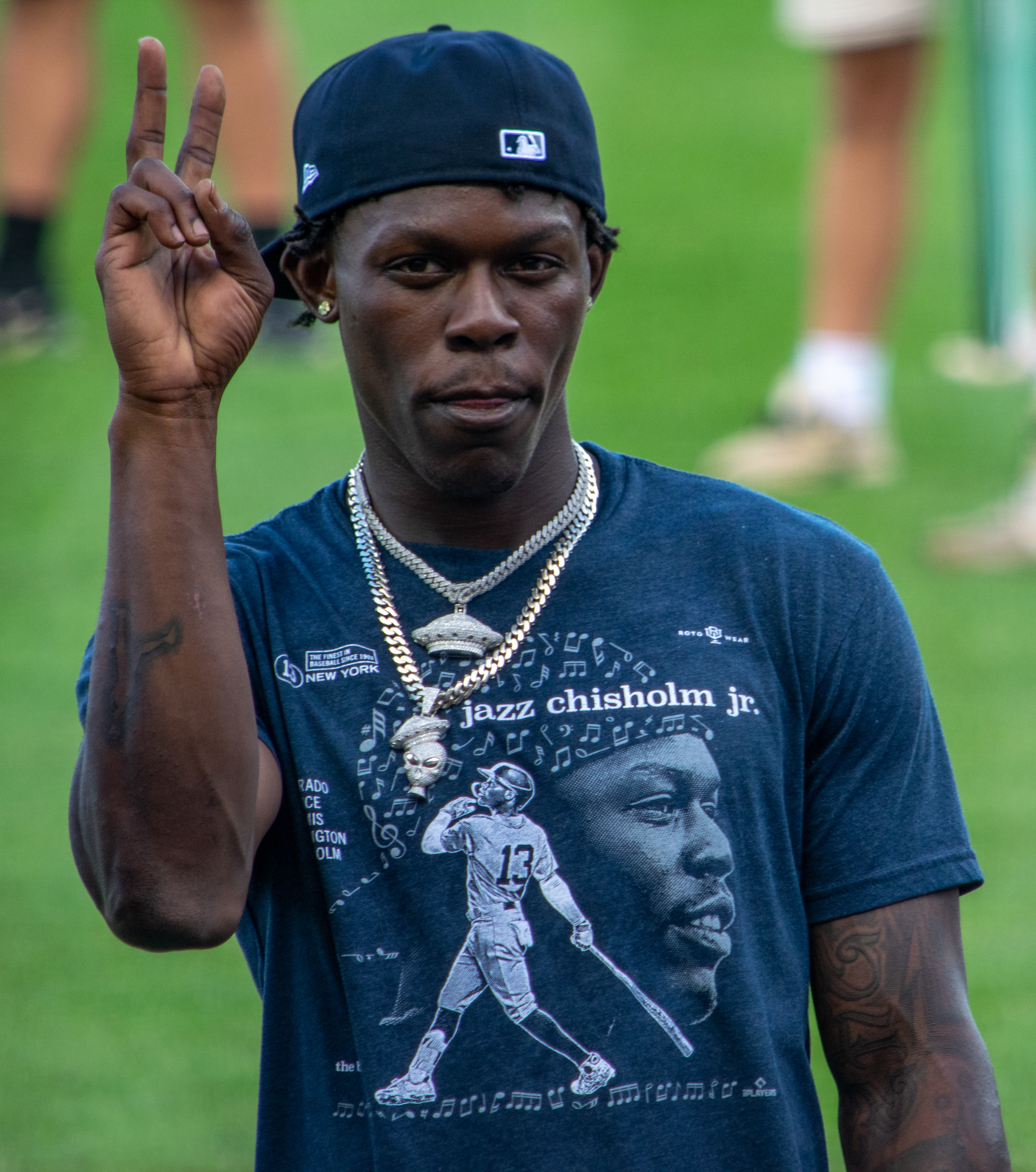
Jazz Chisholm Jr.

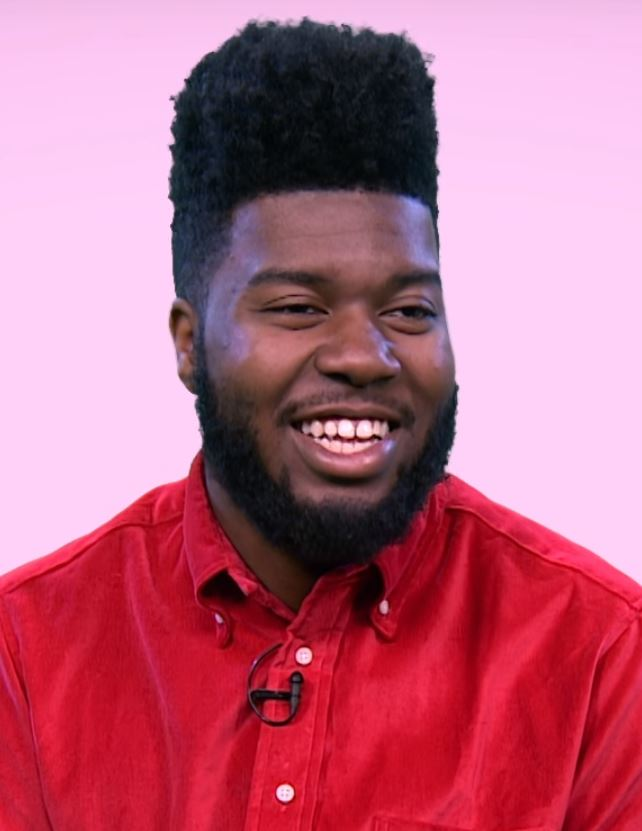
Khalid

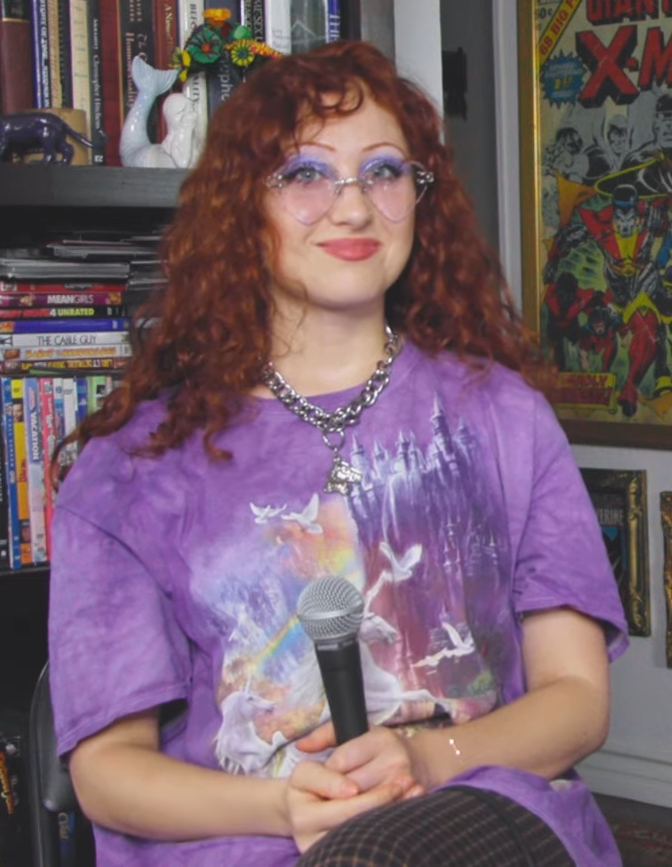
Chappell Roan

- February 1 – Jazz Chisholm Jr., Bahamian baseball infielder
- February 3 – Yang Hao, Chinese diver
- February 4
  - Malik Monk, American basketball player
  - Maximilian Wöber, Austrian footballer
  - George Kirby, American baseball pitcher
- February 6
  - Adley Rutschman, American baseball catcher
  - Jay Lycurgo, English actor
- February 8 – Rui Hachimura, Japanese basketball player
- February 10 – Ayesha Madon, Australian actress
- February 11
  - Niklas Kaul, German decathlete
  - Khalid, American singer and songwriter
  - Josh Jacobs, American football running back
  - Garance Marillier, French actress
- February 12
  - Yungeen Ace, American rapper, singer, and songwriter
  - Josh Jung, American baseball third baseman
- February 13 – Bella Campos, Brazilian actress and model
- February 14 – Sander Berge, Norwegian footballer
- February 15
  - Zachary Gordon, American actor
  - George Russell, British racing driver
- February 16 – Lizze Broadway, American actress
- February 17
  - Mohamed Katir, Moroccan born-Spanish middle-distance runner
  - Devin White, American football linebacker
- February 18 – Vernon, American and South Korean rapper
- February 19
  - Chappell Roan, American singer and songwriter
  - Alice Pagani, Italian actress, model and author
- February 24 – Will Jordan, New Zealand rugby player
- February 26 – Keyla Monterroso Mejia, American actress
- February 27 – Elisa Balsamo, Italian cyclist
- February 28 – Teun Koopmeiners, Dutch footballer

=== March ===
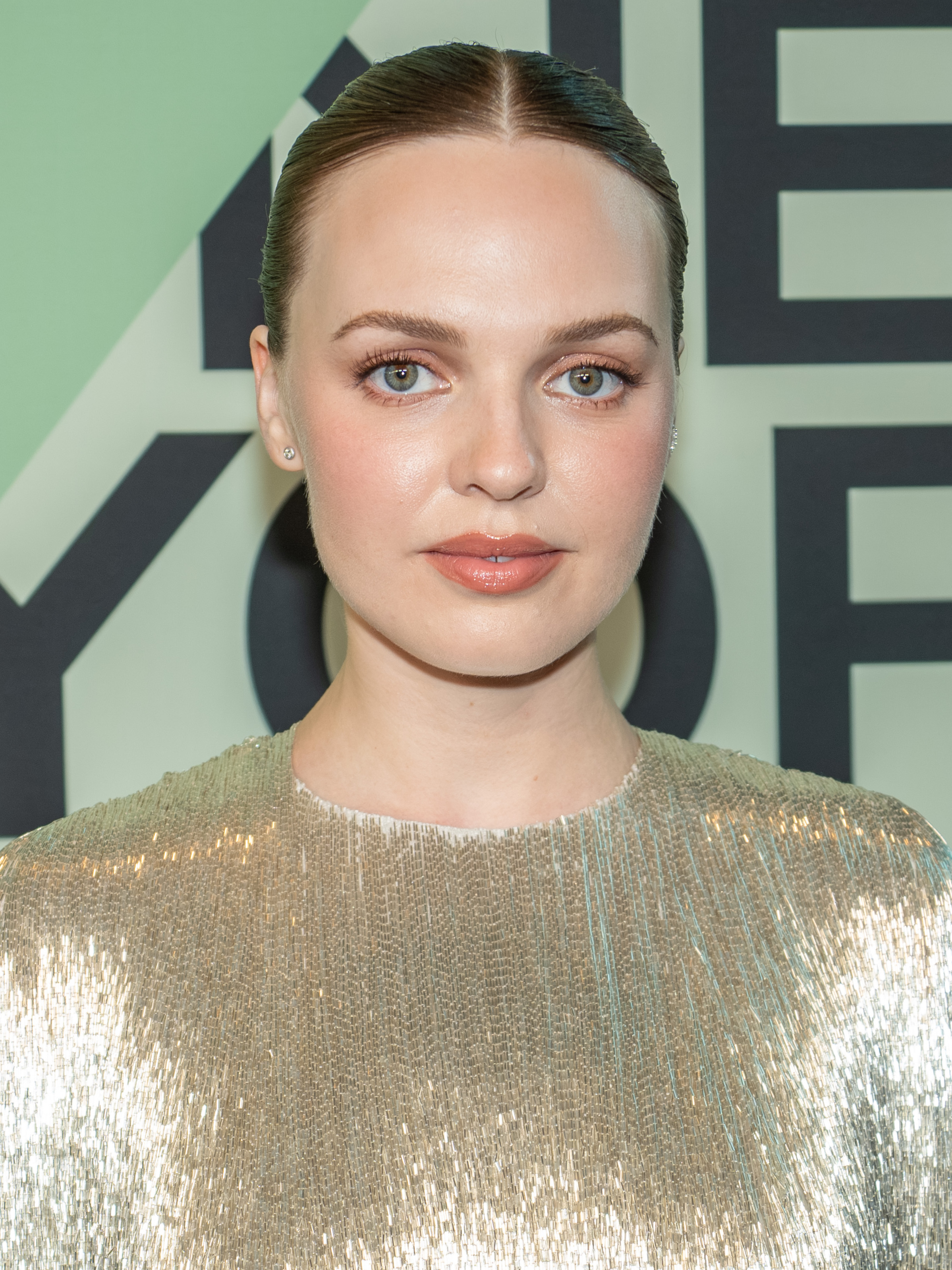
Odessa Young

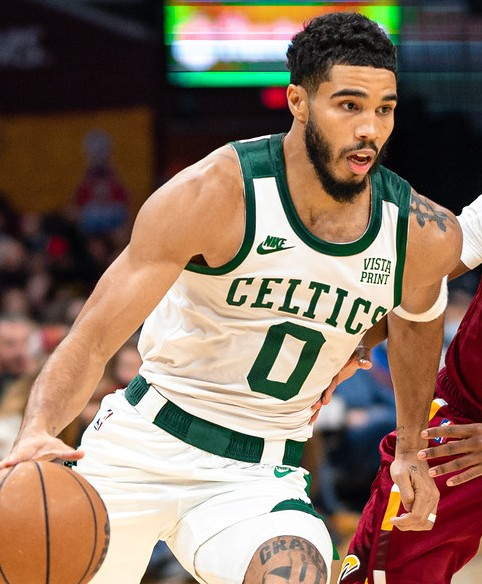
Jayson Tatum

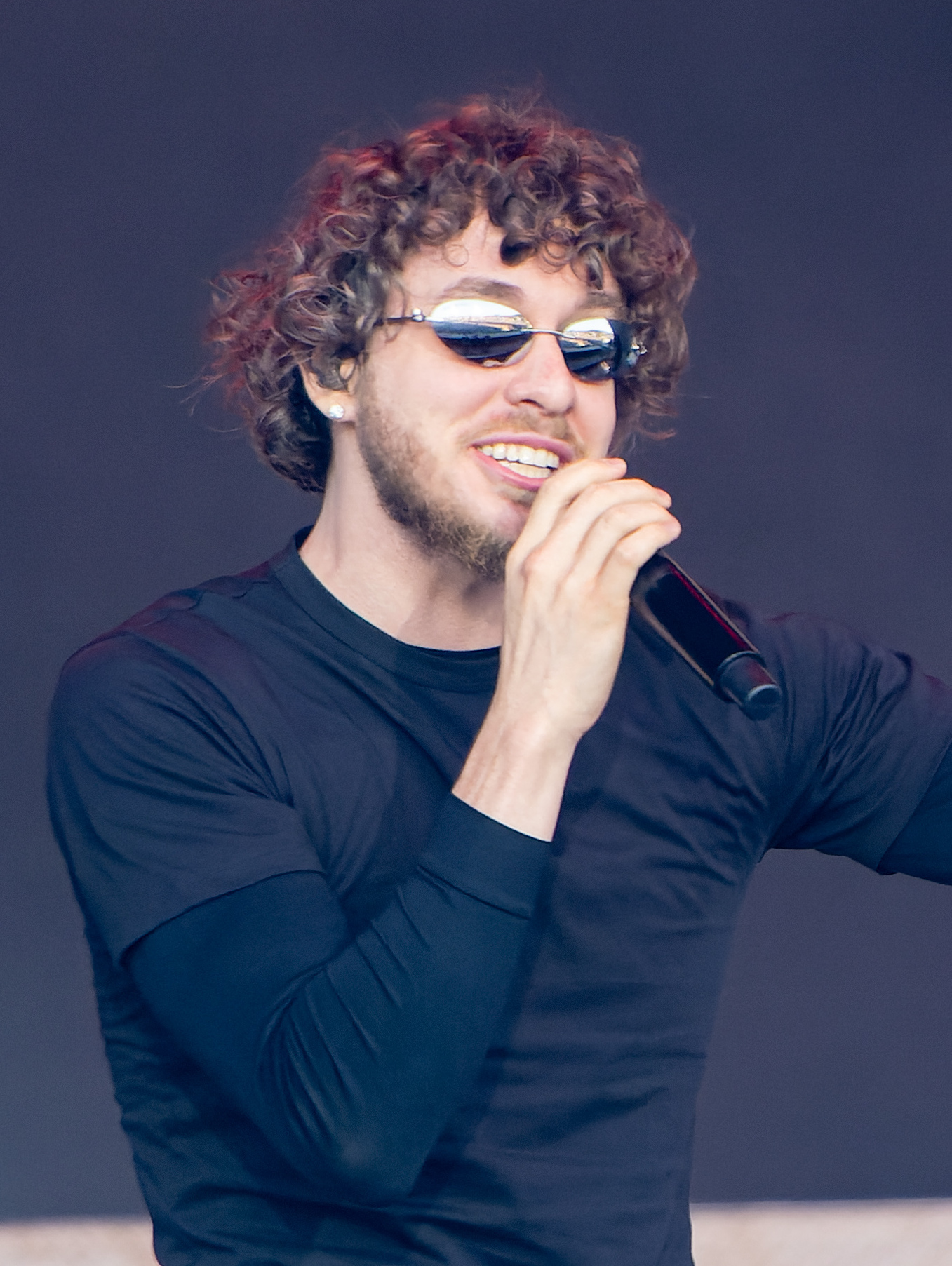
Jack Harlow

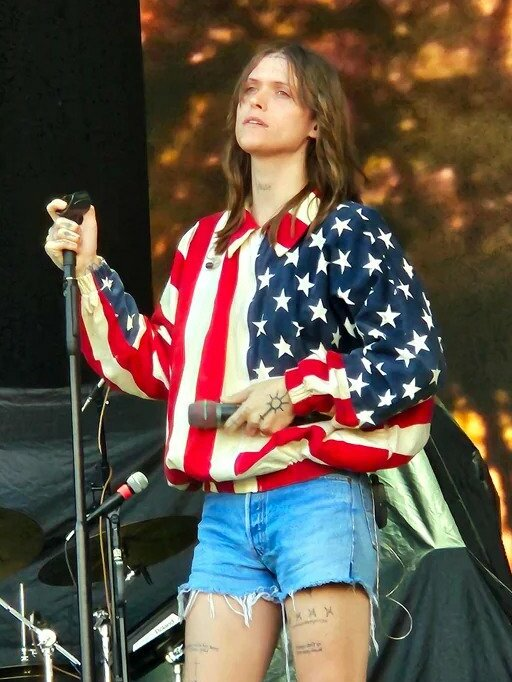
Ethel Cain

- March 2 – Tua Tagovailoa, American football quarterback
- March 3 – Jayson Tatum, American basketball player
- March 5
  - Bo Bichette, American baseball shortstop
  - Merih Demiral, Turkish footballer
- March 6 – Odessa Young, Australian actress
- March 7 – Amanda Gorman, American poet and activist
- March 10 – Justin Herbert, American football quarterback
- March 11
  - Axel Disasi, French footballer
  - Valentina Herszage, Brazilian actress
- March 13
  - Jack Harlow, American rapper
  - Shaoang Liu, Hungarian short track speed skater
- March 17 – Brandon Aiyuk, American football wide receiver
- March 18
  - Miltiadis Tentoglou, Greek track and field athlete
  - Abigail Cowen, American actress and model
  - Emmanuel Clase, Dominican baseball pitcher
- March 19 – Julian Love, American football safety
- March 20 – Letesenbet Gidey, Ethiopian long-distance runner
- March 24
  - Christopher Briney, American actor
  - Ethel Cain, American singer-songwriter, record producer, and model
- March 25 – Vergil Ortiz Jr., American professional boxer
- March 26 – Satoko Miyahara, former Japanese figure skater
- March 28 –Sandi Lovrić, Slovenian footballer
- March 31
  - Anna Seidel, former German short track speed skater
  - Cash Cobain, American rapper

=== April ===
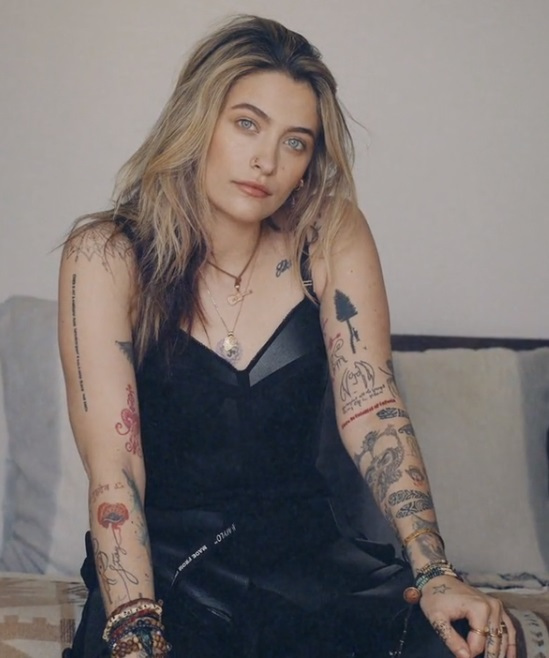
Paris Jackson

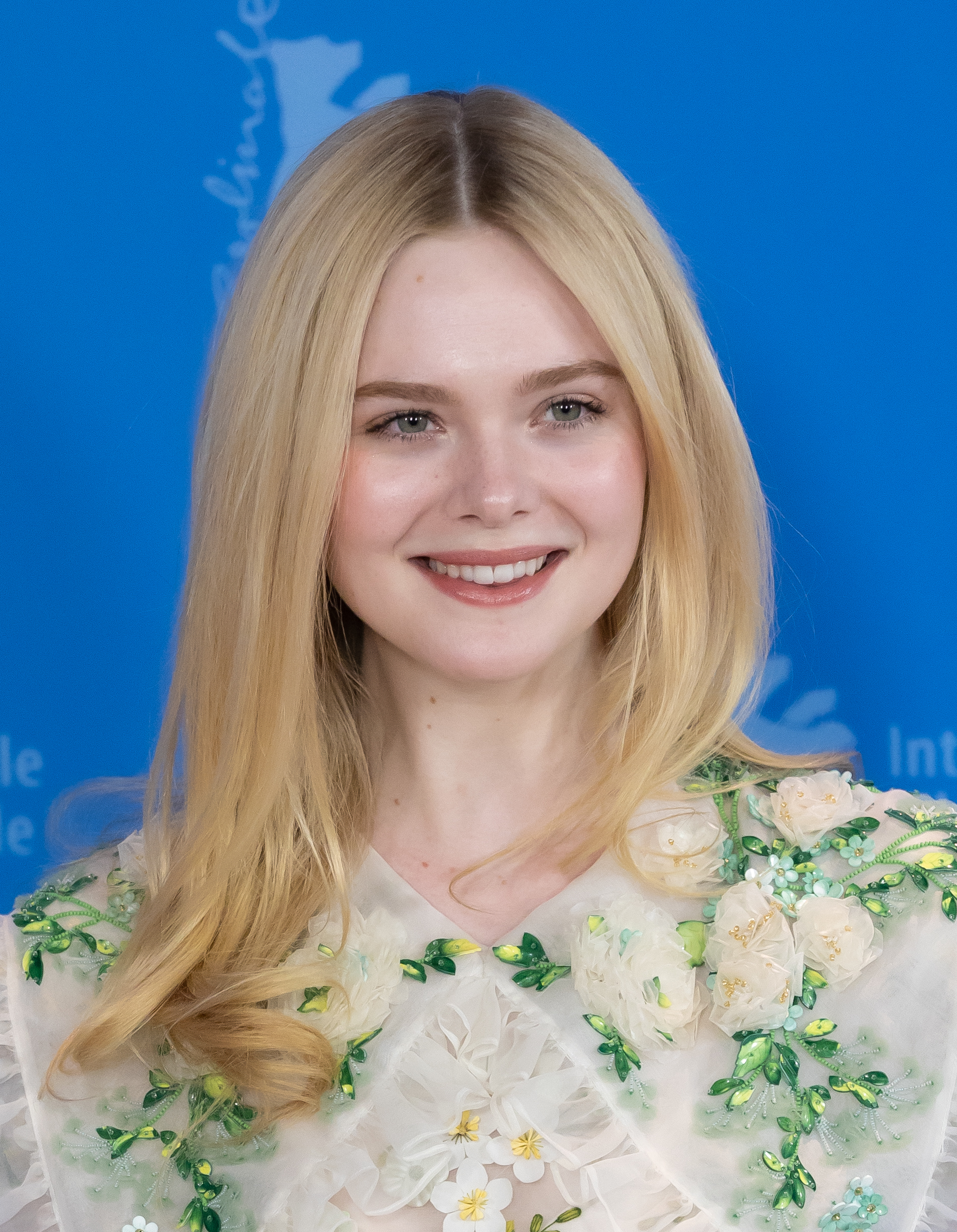
Elle Fanning

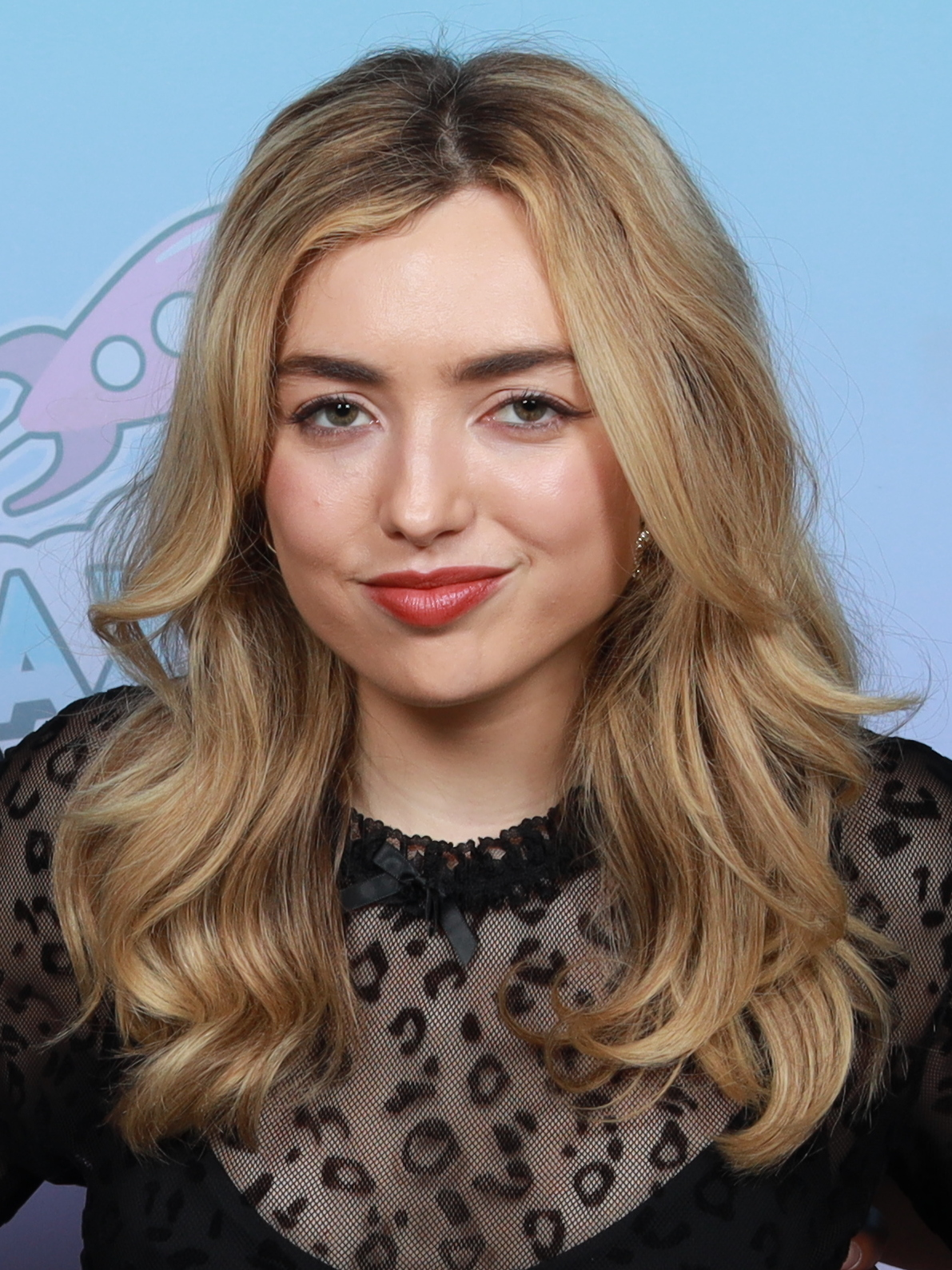
Peyton List

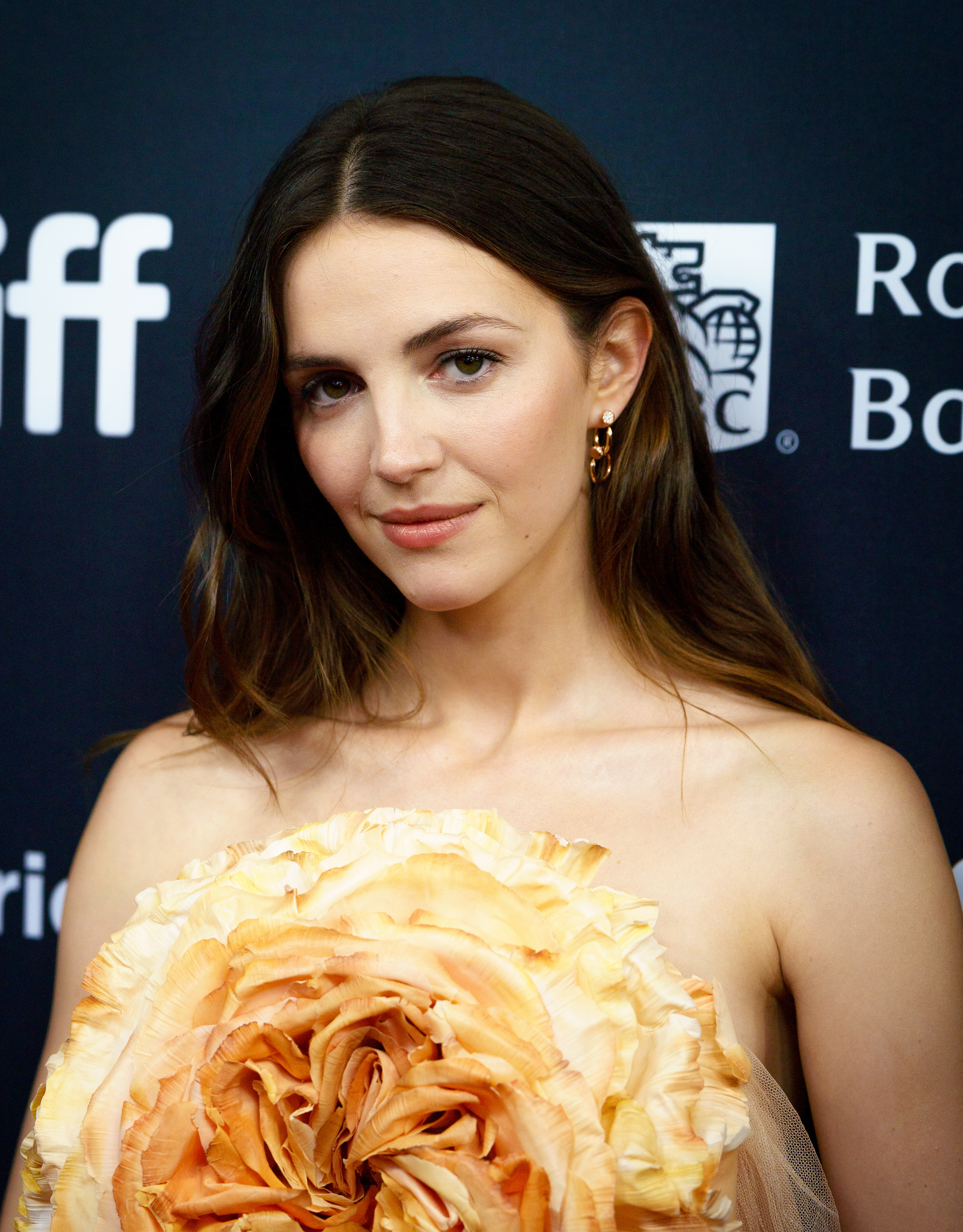
Ella Hunt

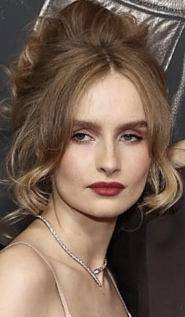
Olivia DeJonge

- April 1 – King Combs, American rapper and model
- April 2 – Caelan Doris, Irish rugby player
- April 3
  - Paris Jackson, American actress and model
  - Wout Faes, Belgian footballer
- April 4 – Ayliva, German singer
- April 6
  - Peyton List, American actress and model
  - Nahuel Molina, Argentine footballer
- April 9 – Elle Fanning, American actress and model
- April 10
  - Anna Pogorilaya, former Russian figure skater
  - Stijn Desmet, Belgian short track speed skater
- April 15
  - Derrick Brown, American football defensive tackle
  - Sexyy Red, American rapper
- April 17
  - Anna Odine Strøm, Norwegian ski jumper
- April 19
  - Patrik Laine, Finnish ice hockey player
  - Zhang Yufei, Chinese swimmer
- April 20 – Felix Mallard, Australian actor
- April 21 – Jarrett Allen, American basketball player
- April 22 – David Raum, German footballer
- April 23 – Brian Burns, American football defensive end
- April 26 – Jan-Krzysztof Duda, Polish chess grandmaster
- April 27
  - Cristian Romero, Argentine footballer
  - Drake Batherson, Canadian ice hockey player
- April 29
  - Ella Hunt, English actress and singer
  - Mallory Swanson, American soccer player
  - Apriyani Rahayu, Indonesian badminton player
- April 30 – Olivia DeJonge, Australian actress

=== May ===
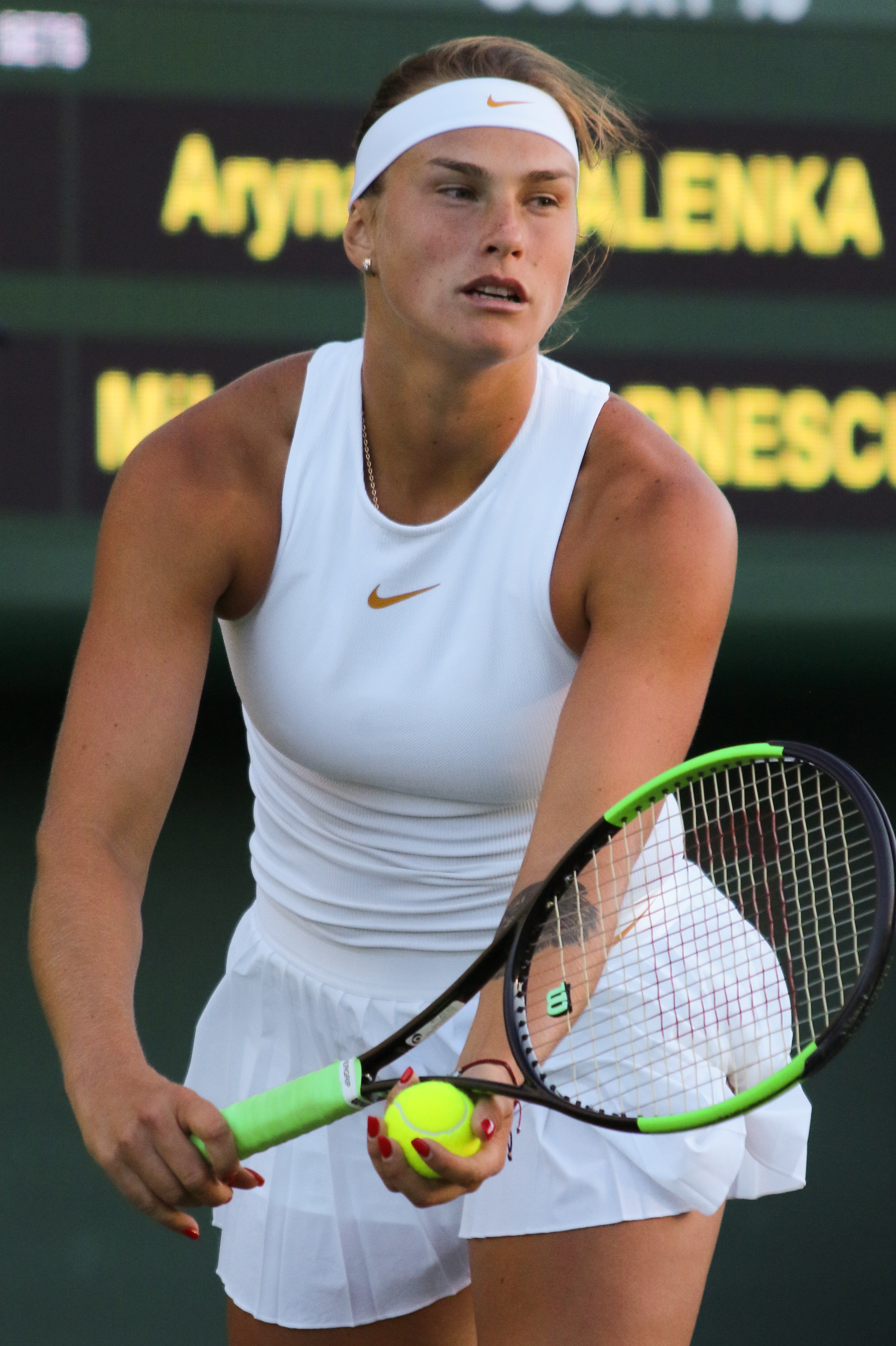
Aryna Sabalenka

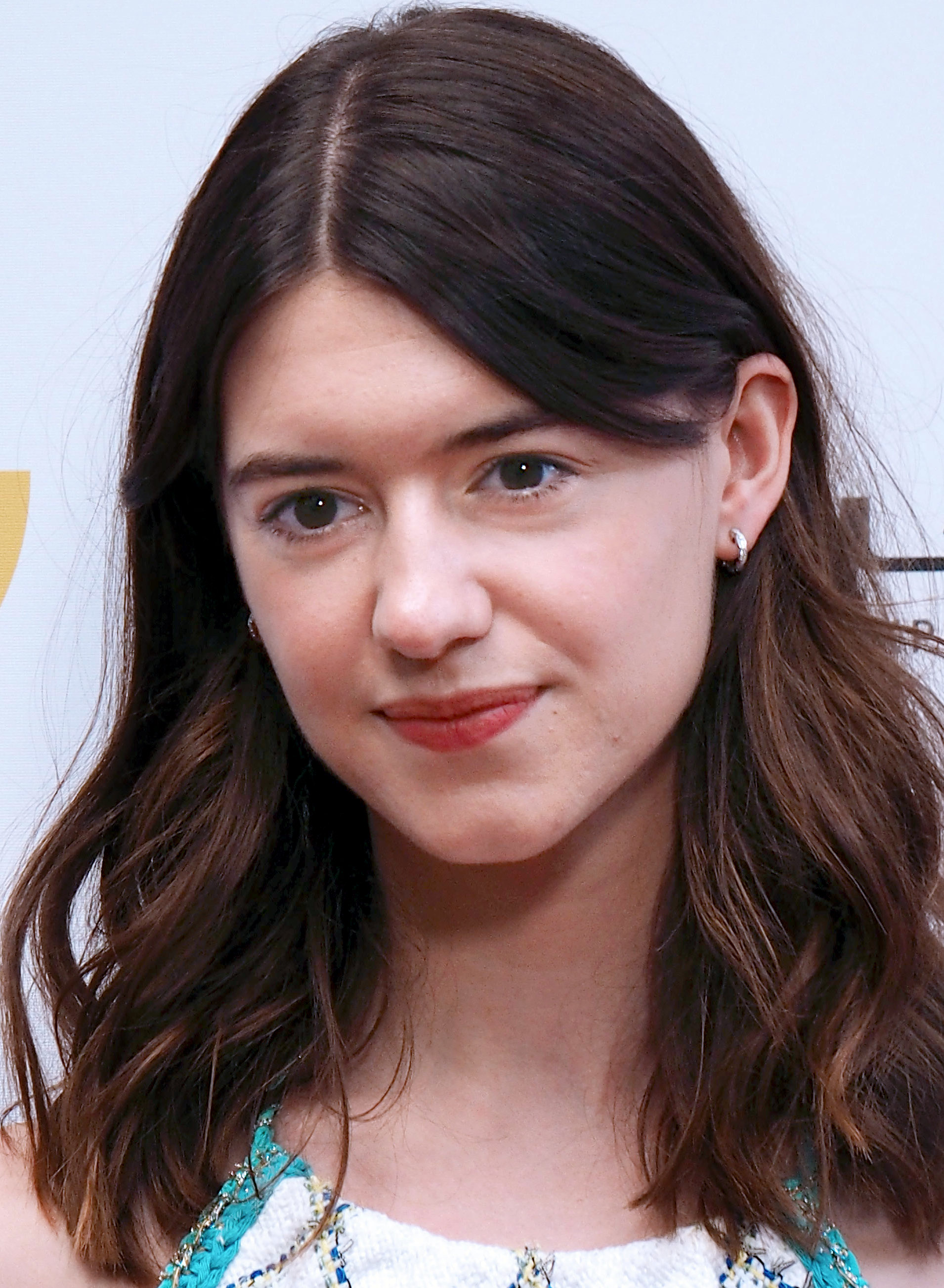
Daisy Edgar-Jones

- May 2
  - Tremaine Edmunds, American football linebacker
  - Jonathan Ikoné, French footballer
- May 4 – Rex Orange County, English singer, multi-instrumentalist and songwriter
- May 5
  - Tijana Bogdanović, Serbian taekwondo practitioner
  - Aryna Sabalenka, Belarusian tennis player
  - Jordan Kyrou, Canadian ice hockey player
- May 6 – Luigi Mangione, perpetrator of the killing of UnitedHealthcare CEO Brian Thompson
- May 7 – Dani Olmo, Spanish footballer
- May 8 – Corey Mylchreest, English actor
- May 9 – Douglas Luiz, Brazilian footballer
- May 10 – Lee Jae-wook, South Korean actor and model
- May 12
  - Mohamed Bamba, American basketball player
  - BigXthaPlug, American rapper and songwriter
- May 18 – Polina Edmunds, former American figure skater
- May 19 – Alex Král, Czech footballer
- May 20 – Beatriz Souza, Brazilian judoka
- May 23
  - Salwa Eid Naser, Bahraini track and field sprinter
  - Steve Lacy, American singer, musician, songwriter, and record producer
- May 24 – Daisy Edgar-Jones, English actress
- May 28 – Dahyun, South Korean singer, rapper, and dancer
- May 29
  - Markelle Fultz, American basketball player
  - Austin Reaves, American basketball player

=== June ===
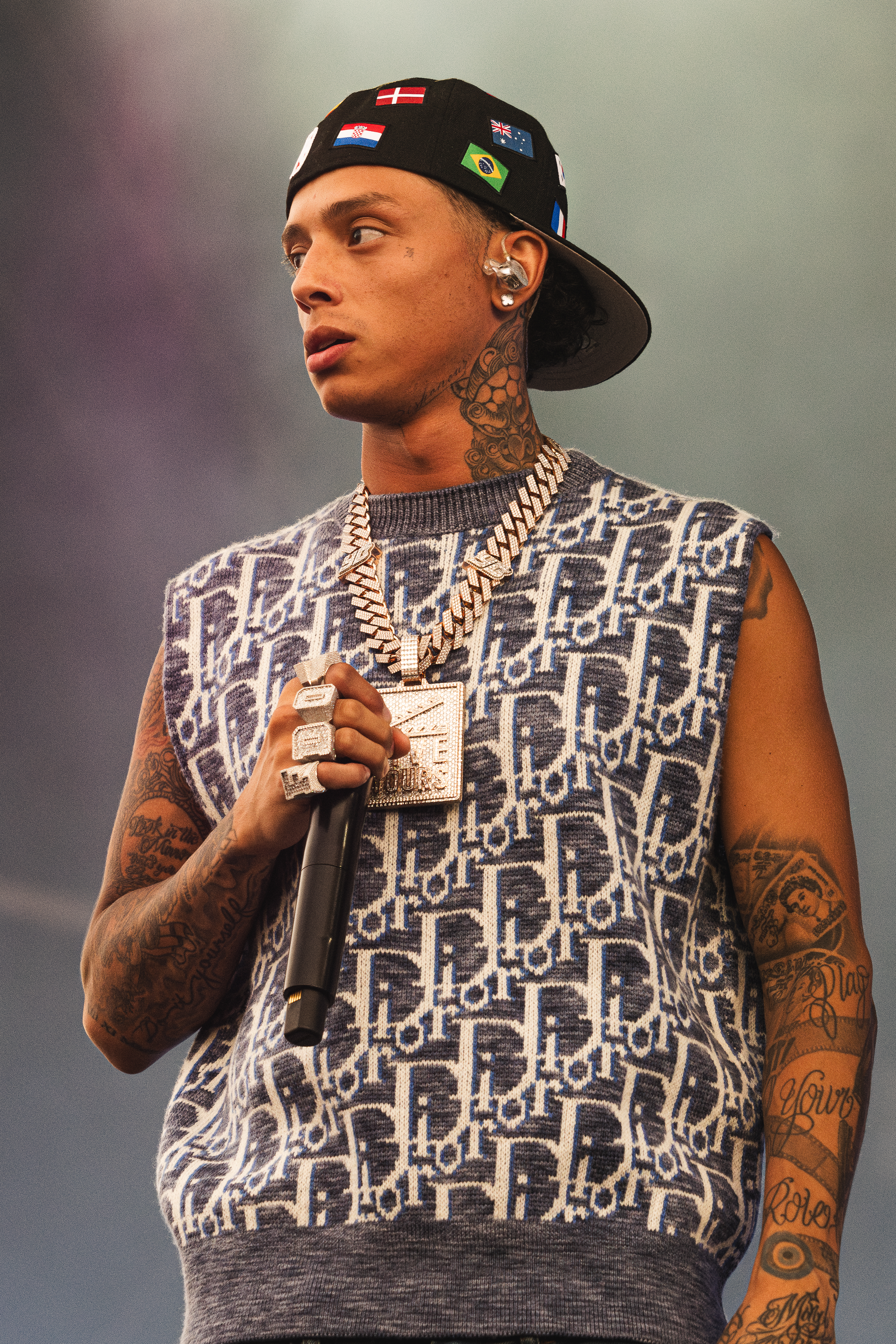
Central Cee

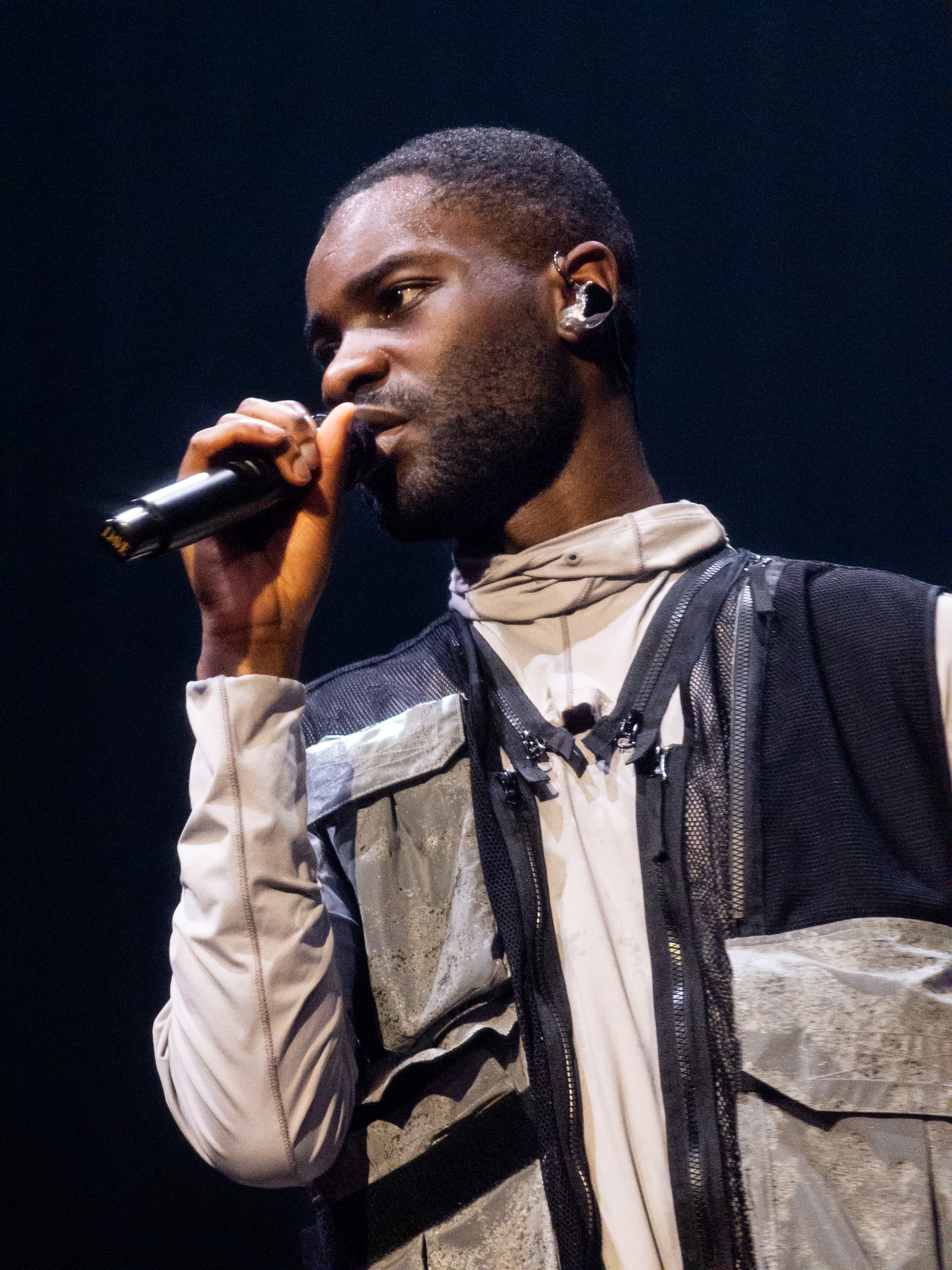
Dave

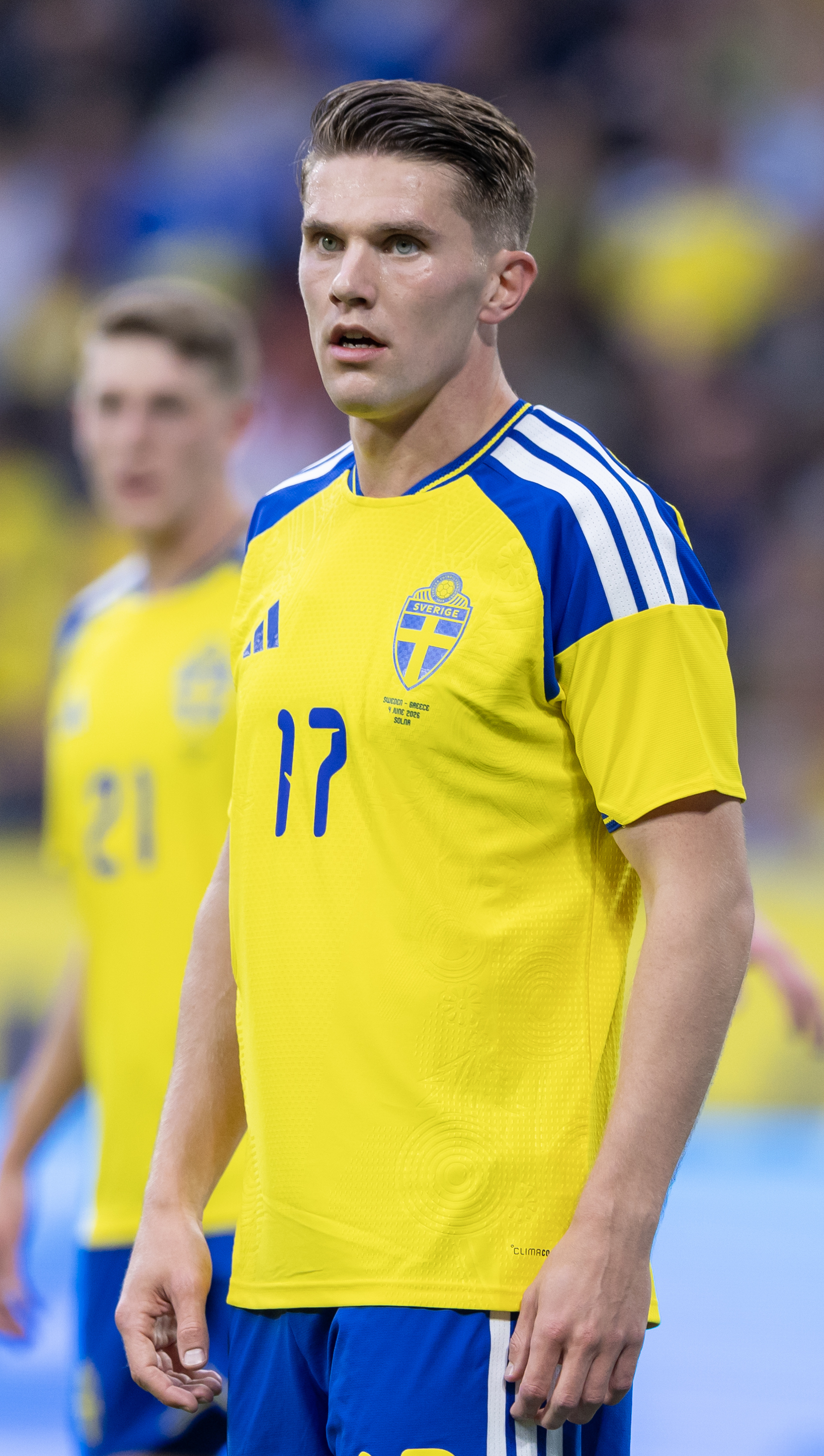
Viktor Gyökeres

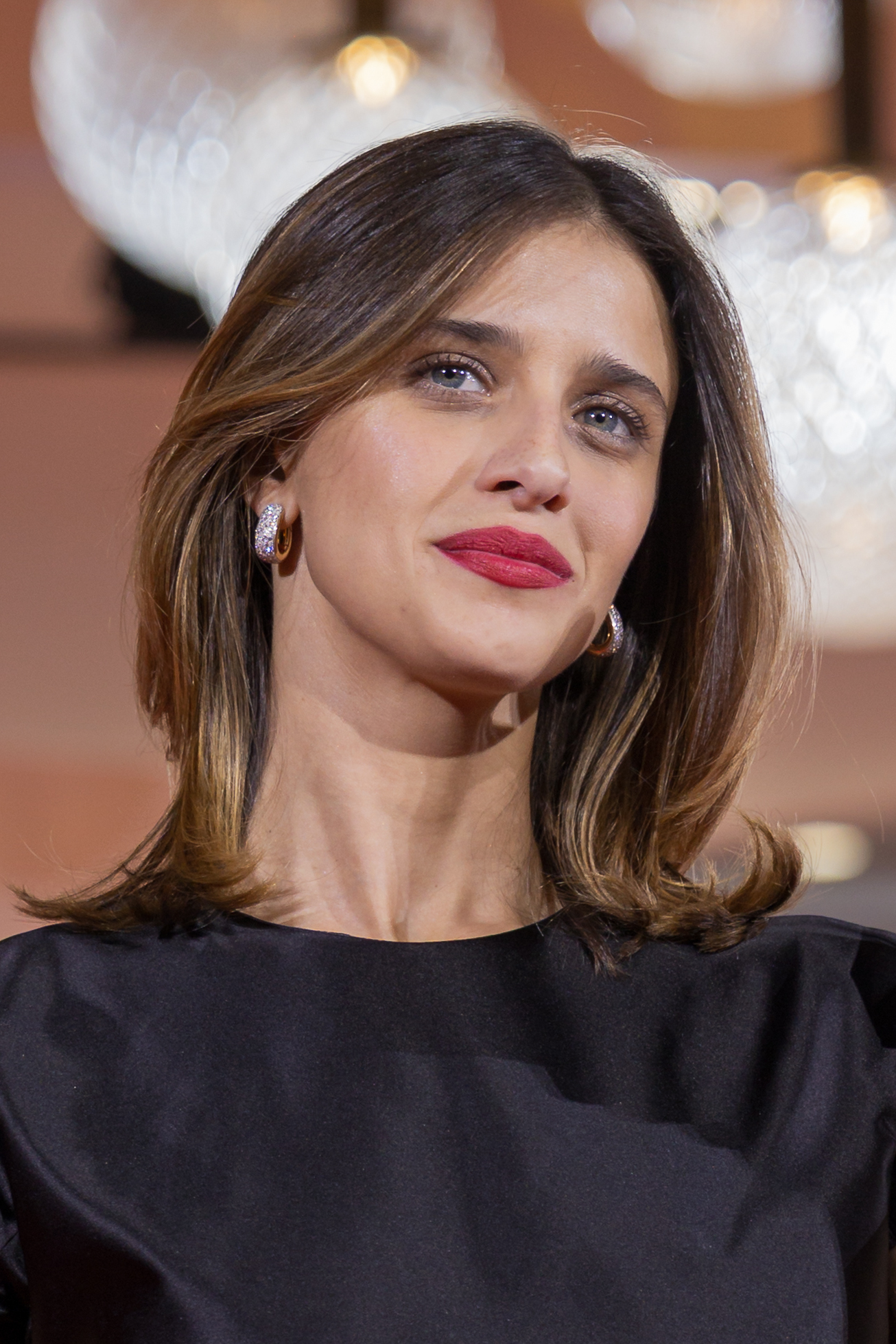
Benedetta Porcaroli

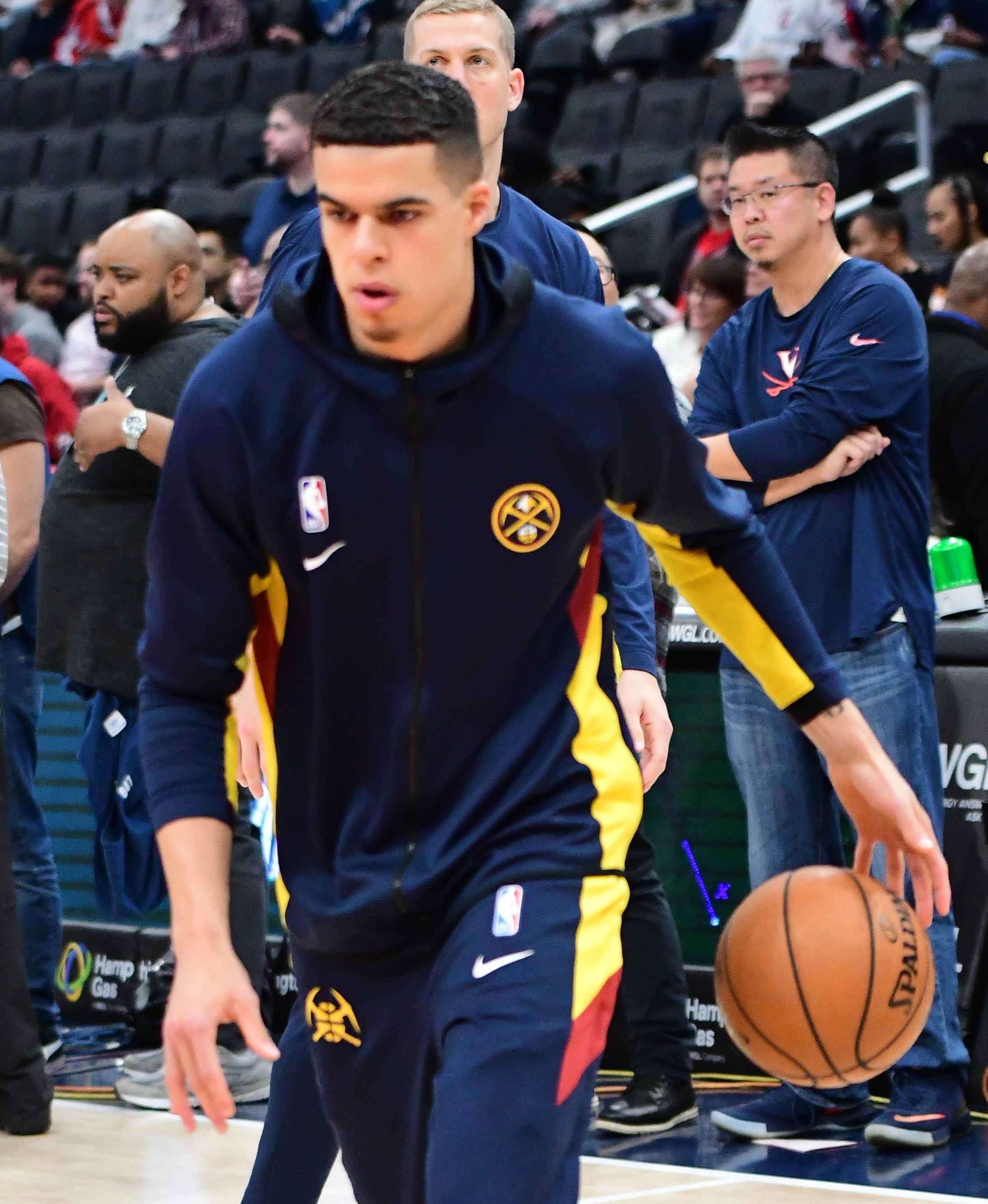
Michael Porter Jr

- June 1 – Aleksandra Soldatova, former Russian rhythmic gymnast
- June 3 – Myles Smith, British singer and songwriter
- June 4
  - Central Cee, British rapper and songwriter
  - Viktor Gyökeres, Swedish footballer
- June 5
  - Yulia Lipnitskaya, former Russian figure skater
  - Maxim Burov, Russian freestyle skier
  - Dave, British rapper
- June 11
  - Charlie Tahan, American actor
  - Wilma Murto, Finnish pole vaulter
  - Benedetta Porcaroli, Italian actress
- June 14
  - Brianne Tju, American actress
  - Shayne Coplan, American businessman and founder of Polymarket
- June 15
  - Alexander Samarin, former Russian figure skater
  - Filippo Tortu, Italian sprinter
- June 16
  - Ritsu Doan, Japanese footballer
  - Maddie Musselman, American water polo player
- June 19
  - Suzu Hirose, Japanese actress and model
  - Viktoriya Zeynep Güneş, Turkish swimmer
  - Atticus Shaffer, American actor
- June 23 – Josip Brekalo, Croatian footballer
- June 24 – Pierre-Luc Dubois, Canadian ice hockey player
- June 25
  - Kyle Chalmers, Australian swimmer
  - Desmond Bane, American basketball player
  - Mikhail Sergachev, Russian ice hockey player
- June 28 – Pedro Gonçalves, Portuguese footballer
- June 29
  - Michael Porter Jr., American basketball player
  - Eberechi Eze, English footballer
- June 30 – Houssem Aouar, French footballer

=== July ===
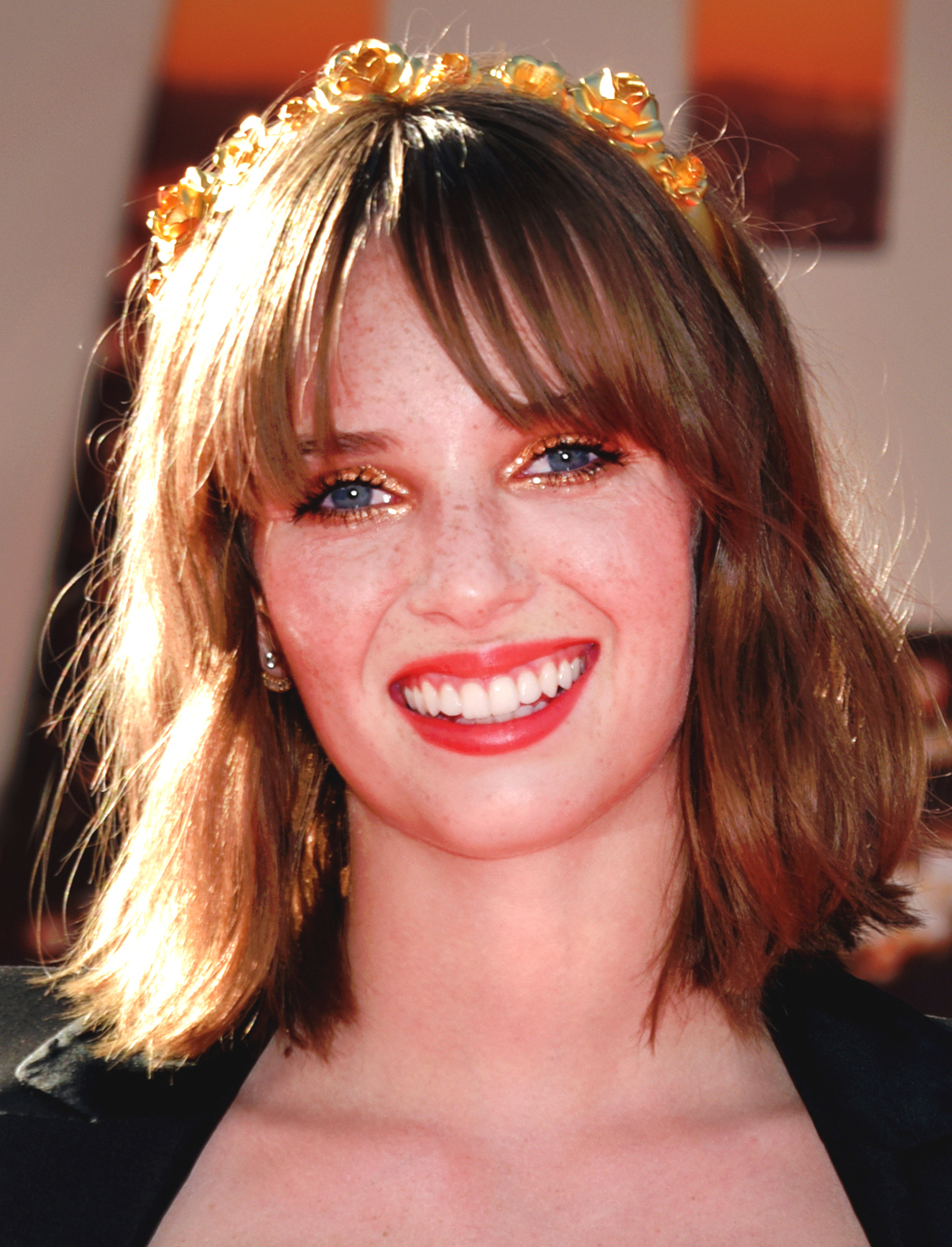
Maya Hawke

Luisa Sonza

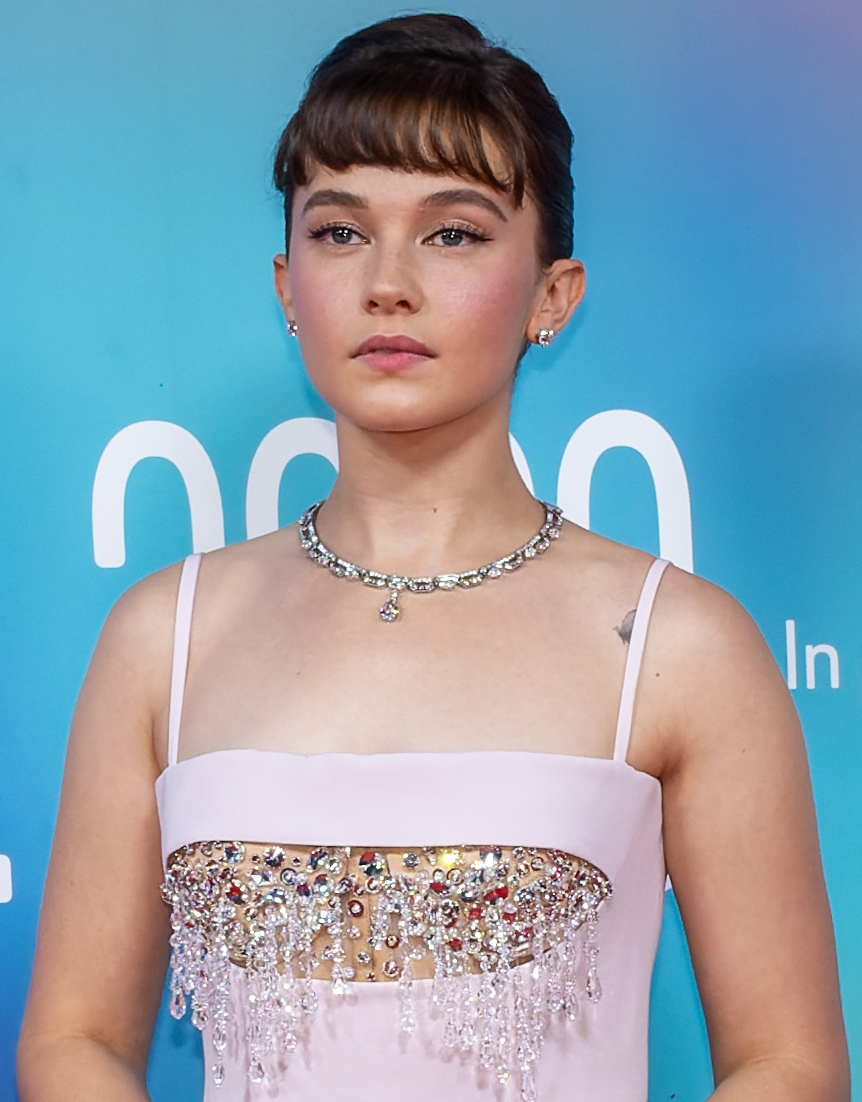
Cailee Spaeny

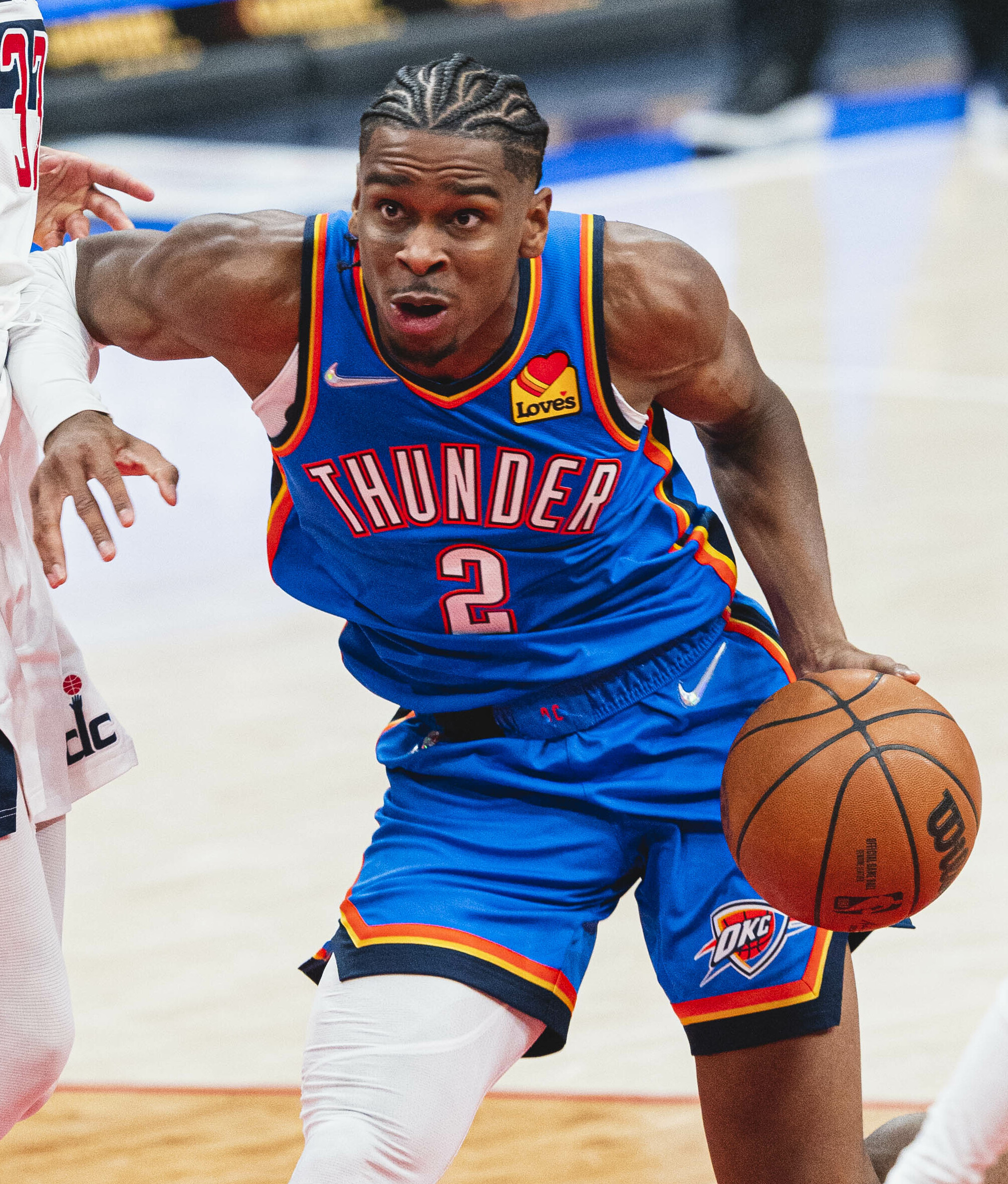
Shai Gilgeous-Alexander

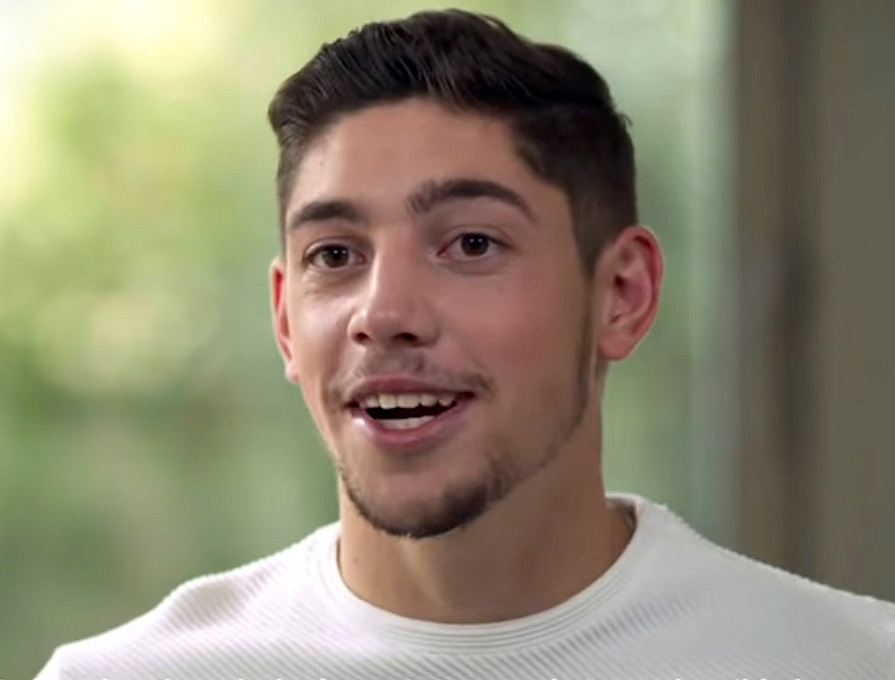
Federico Valverde

- July 3 – Sara Waisglass, Canadian actress
- July 7 – Dylan Sprayberry, American actor
- July 8
  - Maya Hawke, American actress and model
  - Jaden Smith, American rapper, singer, songwriter, and actor
  - Daria Spiridonova, former Russian artistic gymnast
- July 9 – Robert Capron, American actor
- July 10
  - Kimia Alizadeh, Iranian taekwondo athlete
  - Angus Cloud, American actor (d. 2023)
- July 12 – Diyora Keldiyorova, Uzbek judoka
- July 12 – Shai Gilgeous-Alexander, Canadian basketball player
- July 15
  - JayDaYoungan, American rapper (d. 2022)
  - Tyriq Withers, American actor
- July 16 – Rina Matsuno, Japanese singer, model, and actress (d. 2017)
- July 18
  - Devin Bush Jr., American football inside linebacker
  - Luisa Sonza, Brazilian singer-songwriter
- July 19
  - Carla Díaz, Spanish actress and dancer
  - Lola Vice, American professional wrestler
- July 21
  - Maggie Lindemann, American singer-songwriter
  - Magnus Bøe, South Korean Olympic cross-country skier
  - Marie Bouzková, Czech tennis player
- July 22
  - Madison Pettis, American actress and model
  - Federico Valverde, Uruguayan footballer
  - Marc Cucurella, Spanish footballer
- July 23
  - Deandre Ayton, Bahamian basketball player
  - Houdini, Canadian rapper (d. 2020).
- July 24
  - Cailee Spaeny, American actress
  - Sophie Wotschke, Austrian politician
- July 28 – Frank Ntilikina, French basketball player
- July 29
  - Clayton Keller, American ice hockey player
  - Tijjani Reijnders, Dutch footballer
- July 30 – Jesper Bratt, Swedish ice hockey player
- July 31
  - Rico Rodriguez, American actor
  - Quincy Hall, American athlete

=== August ===
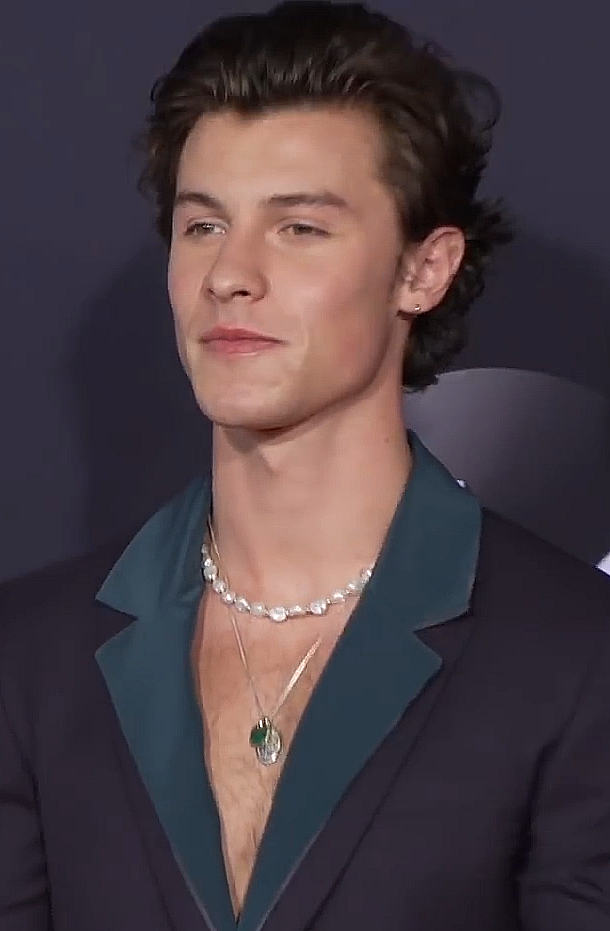
Shawn Mendes

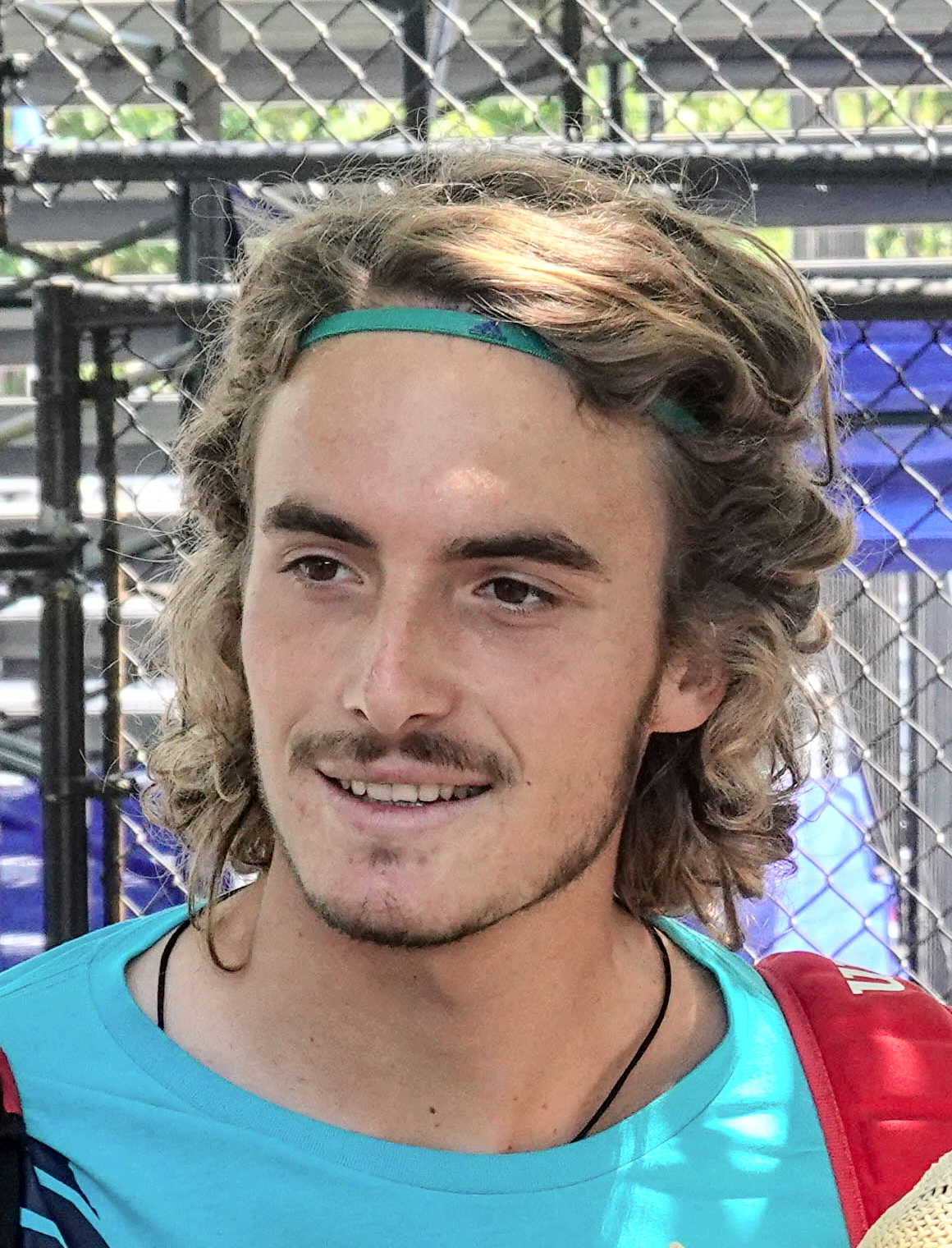
Stefanos Tsitsipas

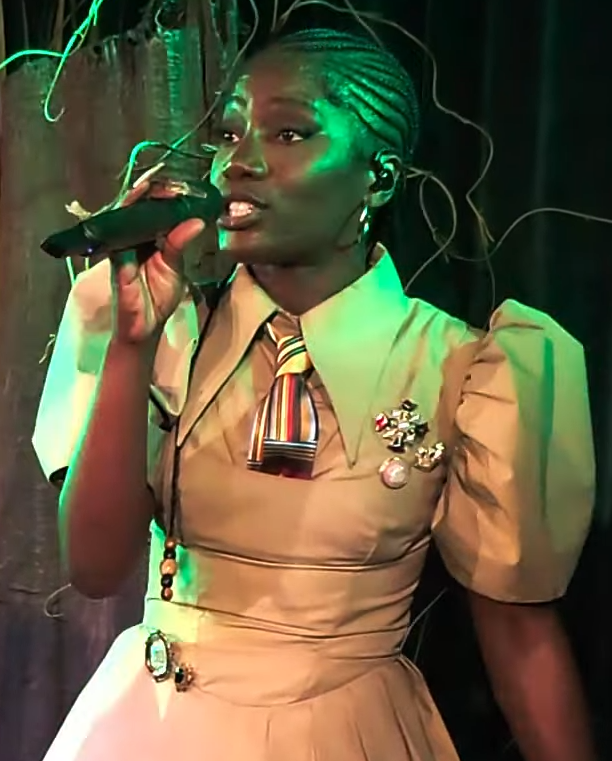
Doechii

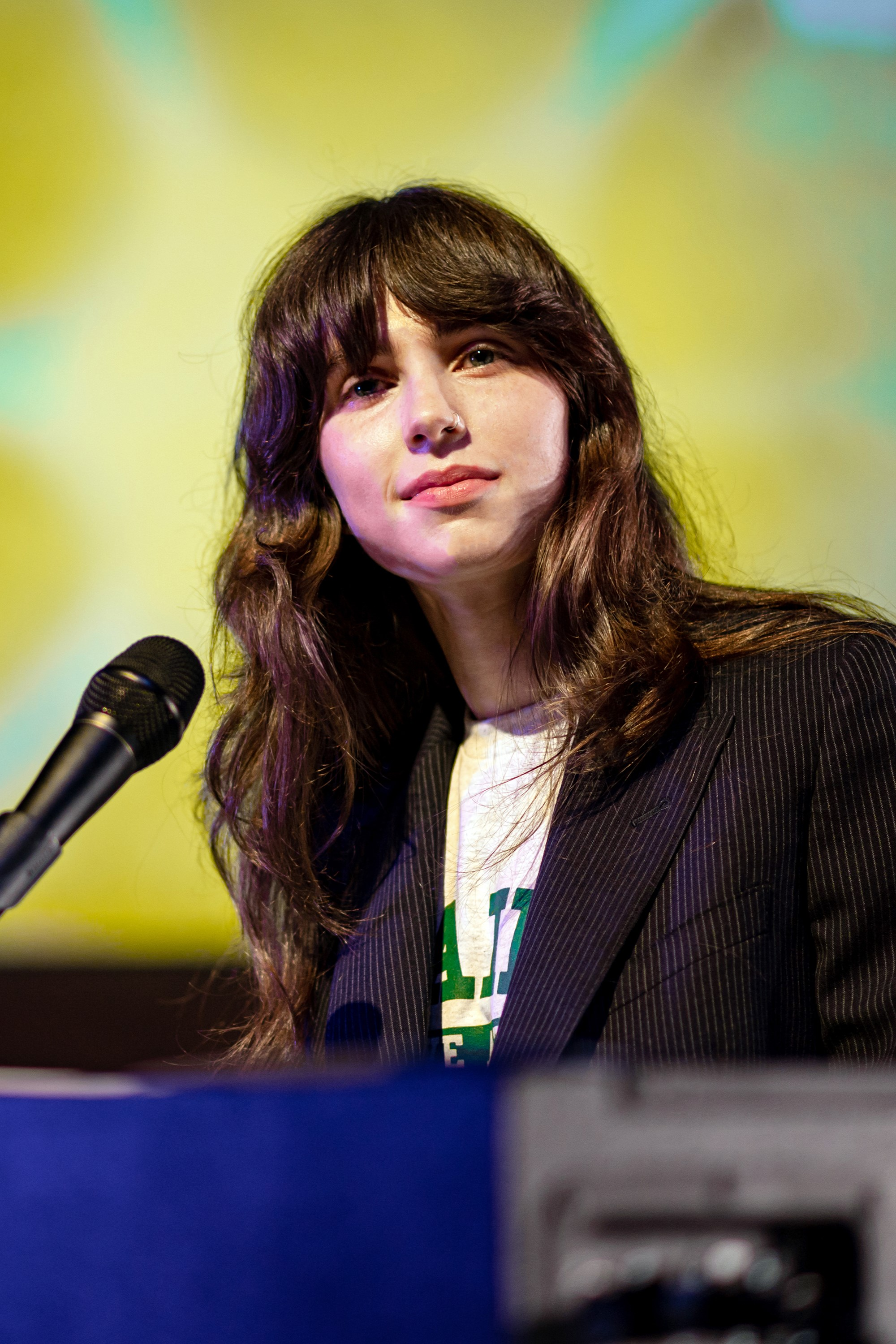
Clairo

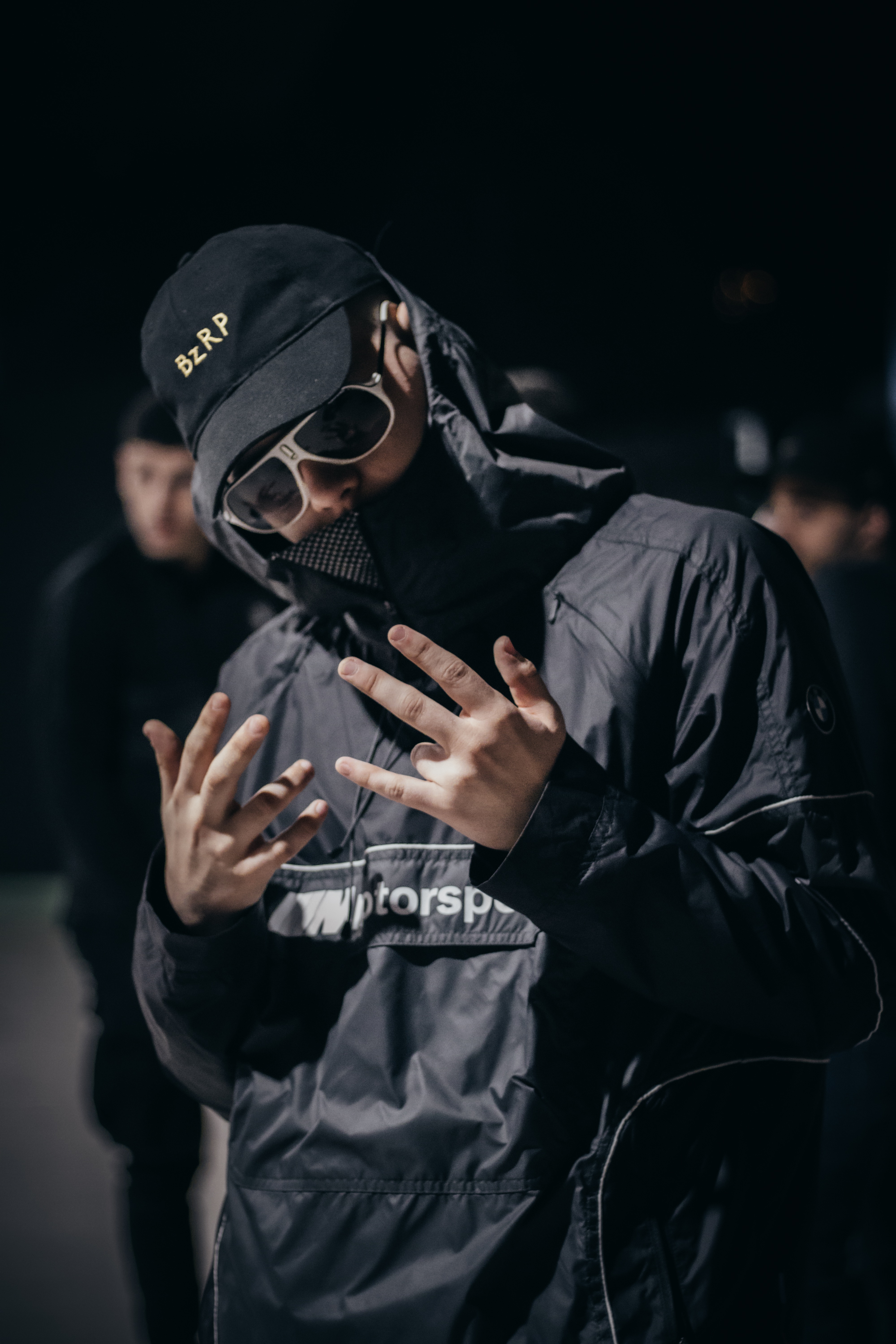
Bizarrap

- August 2 – Sophie Hansson, Swedish swimmer
- August 3 – Cozi Zuehlsdorff, American actress, pianist, and singer
- August 4 – Lil Skies, American rapper
- August 5 – Mimi Keene, English actress
- August 6
  - Ceylin del Carmen Alvarado, Dominican-born Dutch cyclist
  - Forrest Goodluck, American actor
- August 7 – Jalen Hurts, American football player
- August 8
  - Shawn Mendes, Canadian singer-songwriter
  - Ryan Garcia, American professional boxer
- August 9
  - Jorrit Croon, Dutch hockey player
  - Panagiotis Retsos, Greek footballer
  - Zelym Kotsoiev, Ukrainian-Azerbaijani judoka
- August 11 – Juan Miguel Echevarría, Cuban long jumper
- August 12 – Stefanos Tsitsipas, Greek tennis player
- August 13
  - Arina Averina, former Russian rhythmic gymnast
  - Dina Averina, former Russian rhythmic gymnast
  - Francisco Cerúndolo, Argentine tennis player
- August 14 – Doechii, American rapper, singer and songwriter
- August 16 – Antoine Winfield Jr., American football safety
- August 18
  - Tenshin Nasukawa, Japanese kickboxer and mixed martial artist
  - Clairo, an American singer-songwriter
  - Nick Fuentes, American far-right political commentator
- August 20 – Lieke Klaver, Dutch track and field athlete
- August 24
  - Marc Hirschi, Swiss cyclist
  - P. J. Washington, American basketball player
  - Mason Miller, American baseball pitcher
- August 25
  - Abraham Mateo, Spanish singer and actor
  - China Anne McClain, American actress and singer
- August 26 – Soyeon, South Korean rapper, singer-songwriter, and record producer
- August 27
  - Kevin Huerter, American basketball player
  - Matheus Nunes, Portuguese footballer
  - Rod Wave – American rapper, singer, and songwriter
- August 29 – Bizarrap, Argentine record producer, songwriter and DJ
- August 31
  - Jaylen Barron – American actress
  - BossMan Dlow – American rapper

=== September ===
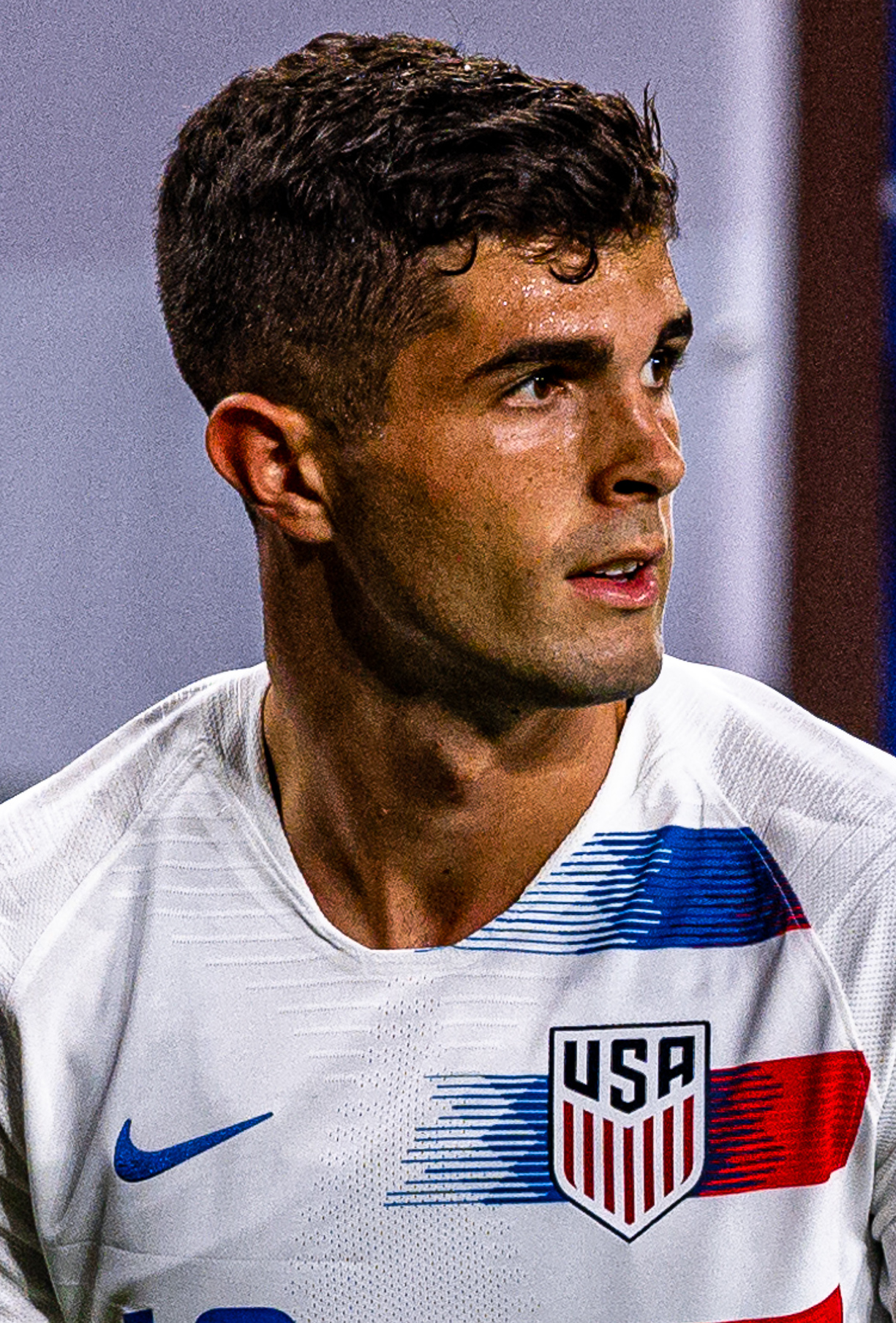
Christian Pulisic

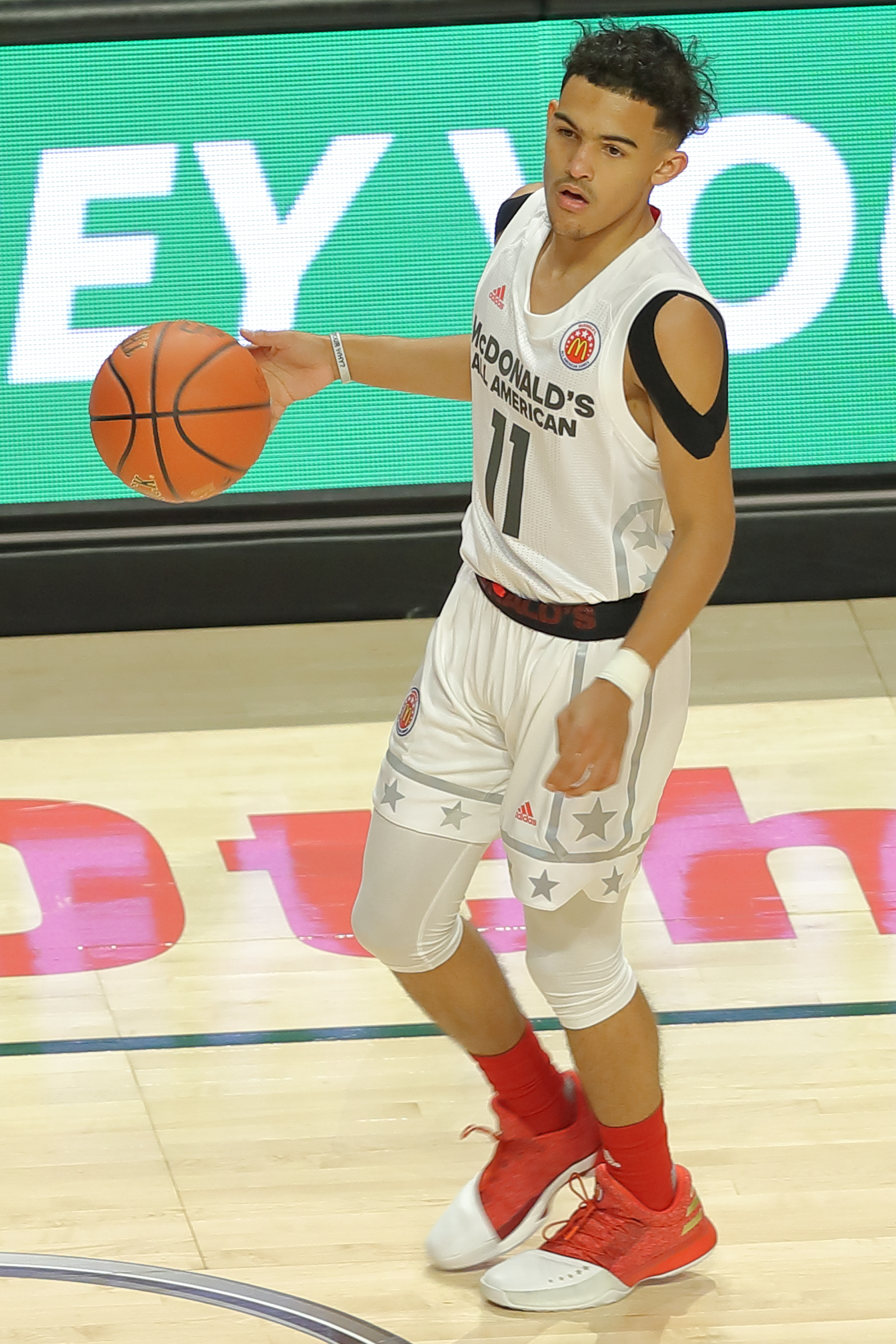
Trae Young

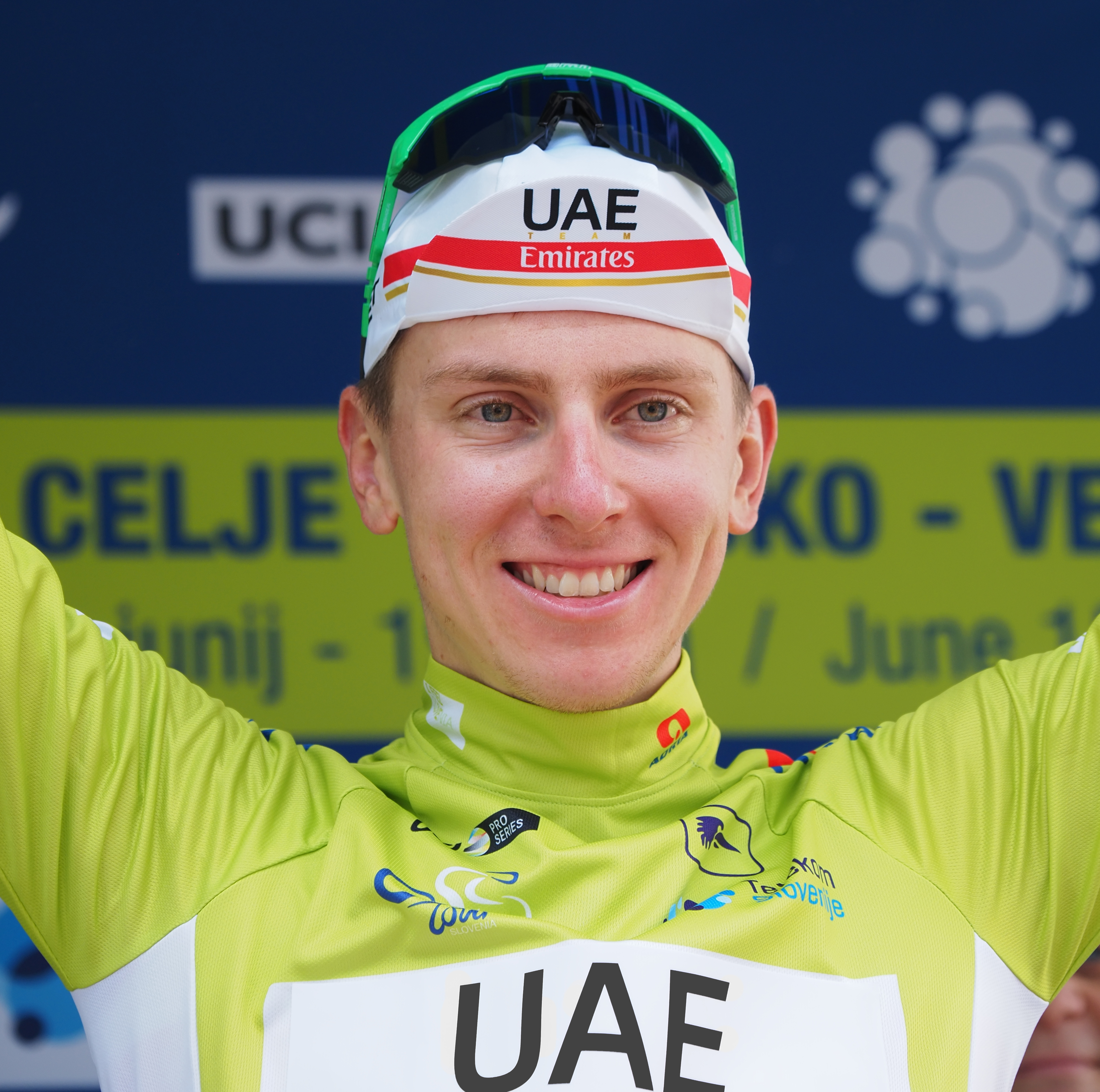
Tadej Pogačar

- September 2 – Ama Qamata, South African actress
- September 5 – Matteo Rizzo, Italian figure skater
- September 7 – Damian Hardung, German actor
- September 9 – Choi Min-jeong, South Korean short track speed skater
- September 10 – Sheck Wes, American rapper
- September 13 – Satoshi, Moldovan rapper and singer-songwriter
- September 16 – Emily Fairn, English actress
- September 18 – Christian Pulisic, American footballer
- September 19
  - Trae Young, American basketball player
  - Phia Saban, English actress
- September 20
  - Marco Arop, Canadian middle-distance runner
  - Trevon Diggs, American football cornerback
  - Grant Delpit, American football safety
- September 21
  - Tadej Pogačar, Slovenian cyclist
  - Yainer Díaz, Dominican baseball catcher
- September 23 – A. J. Terrell, American football cornerback
- September 28 –Aleksandra Goryachkina, Russian chess Grandmaster
- September 30
  - Landon Dickerson, American football guard
  - Devin Lloyd, American football linebacker

=== October ===
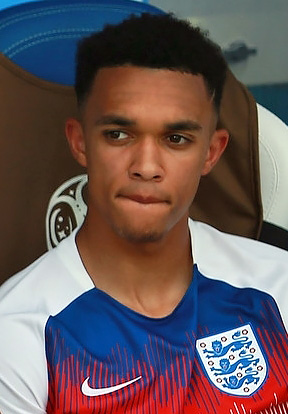
Trent Alexander-Arnold

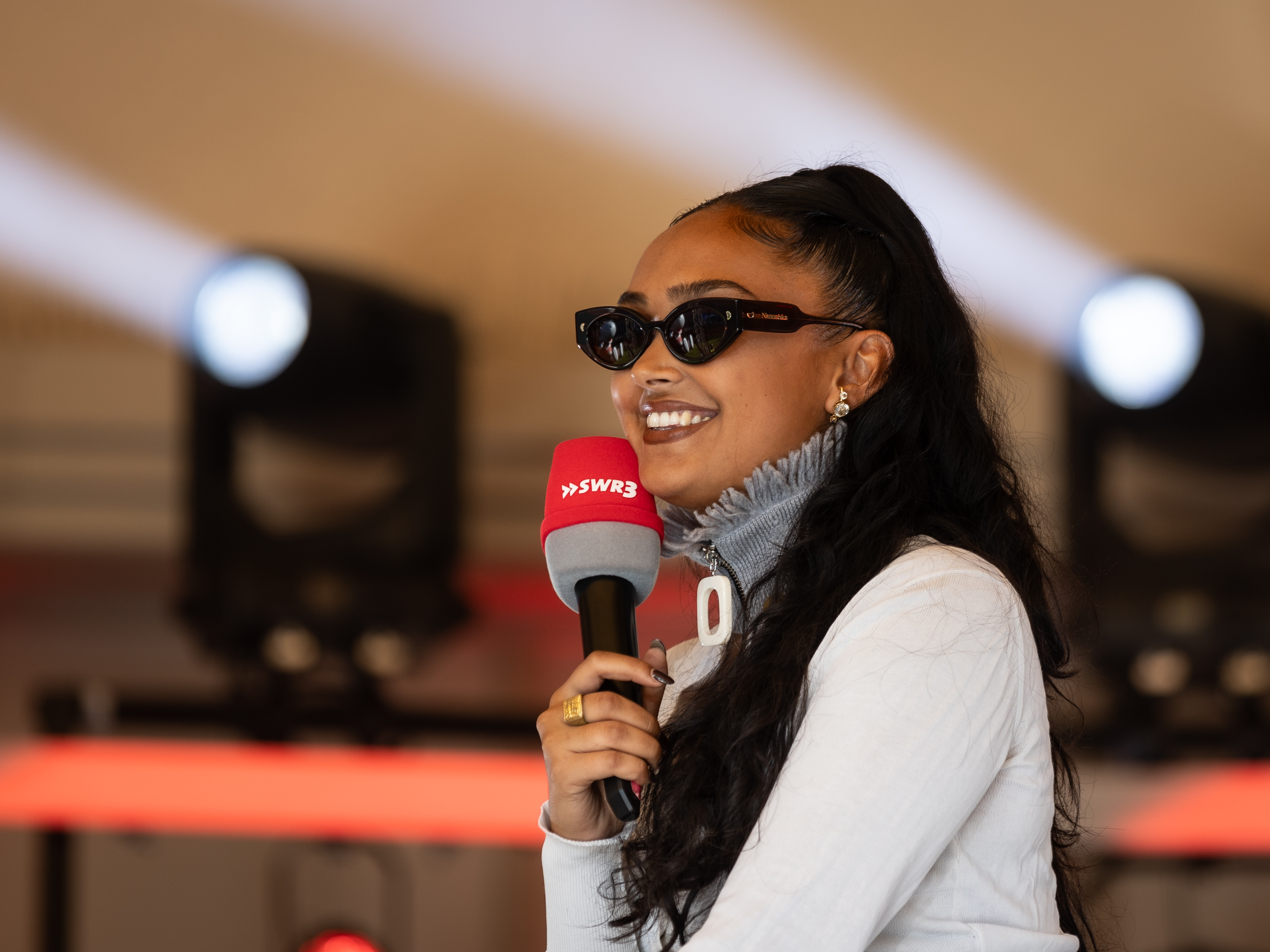
Joy Crookes

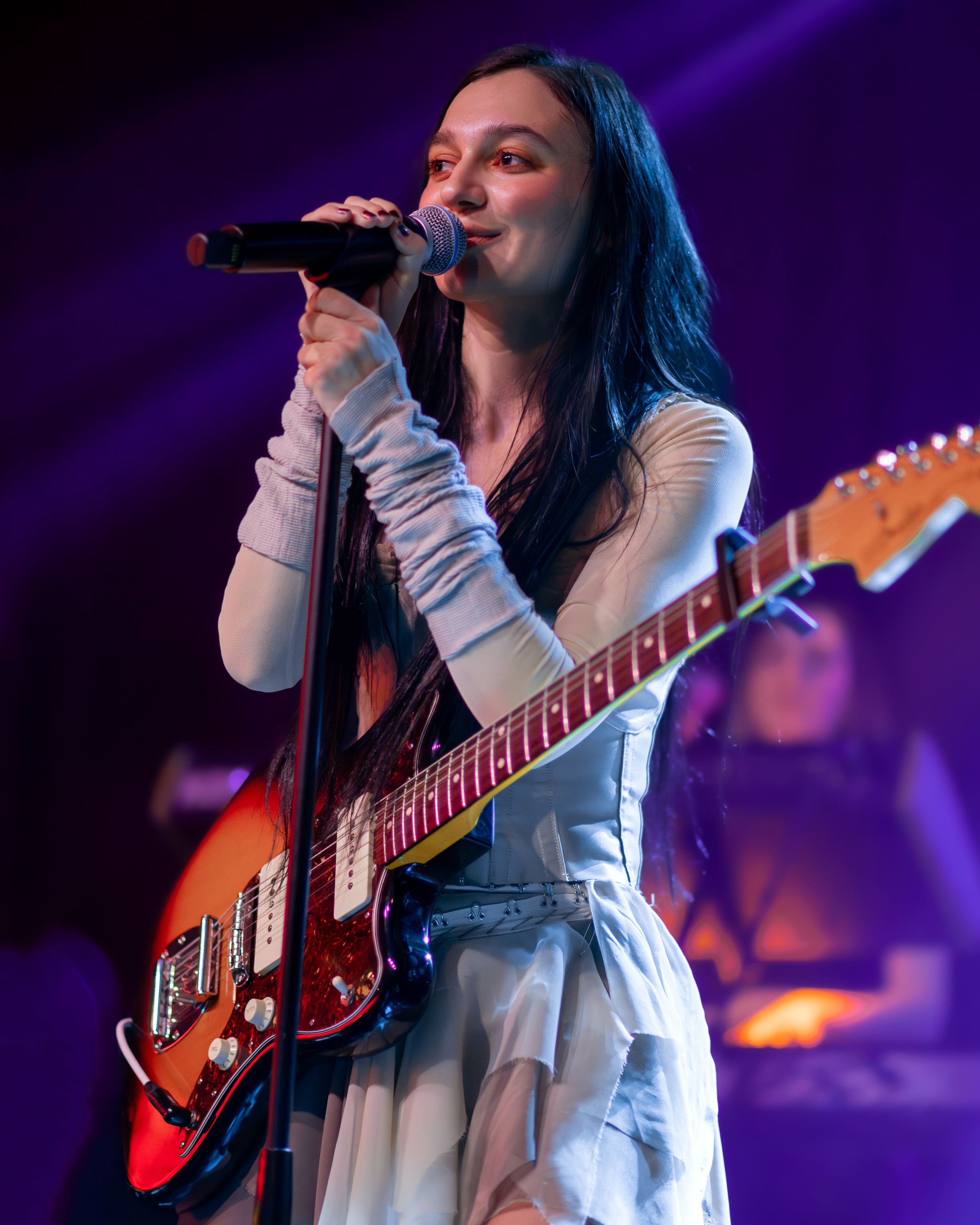
Daya

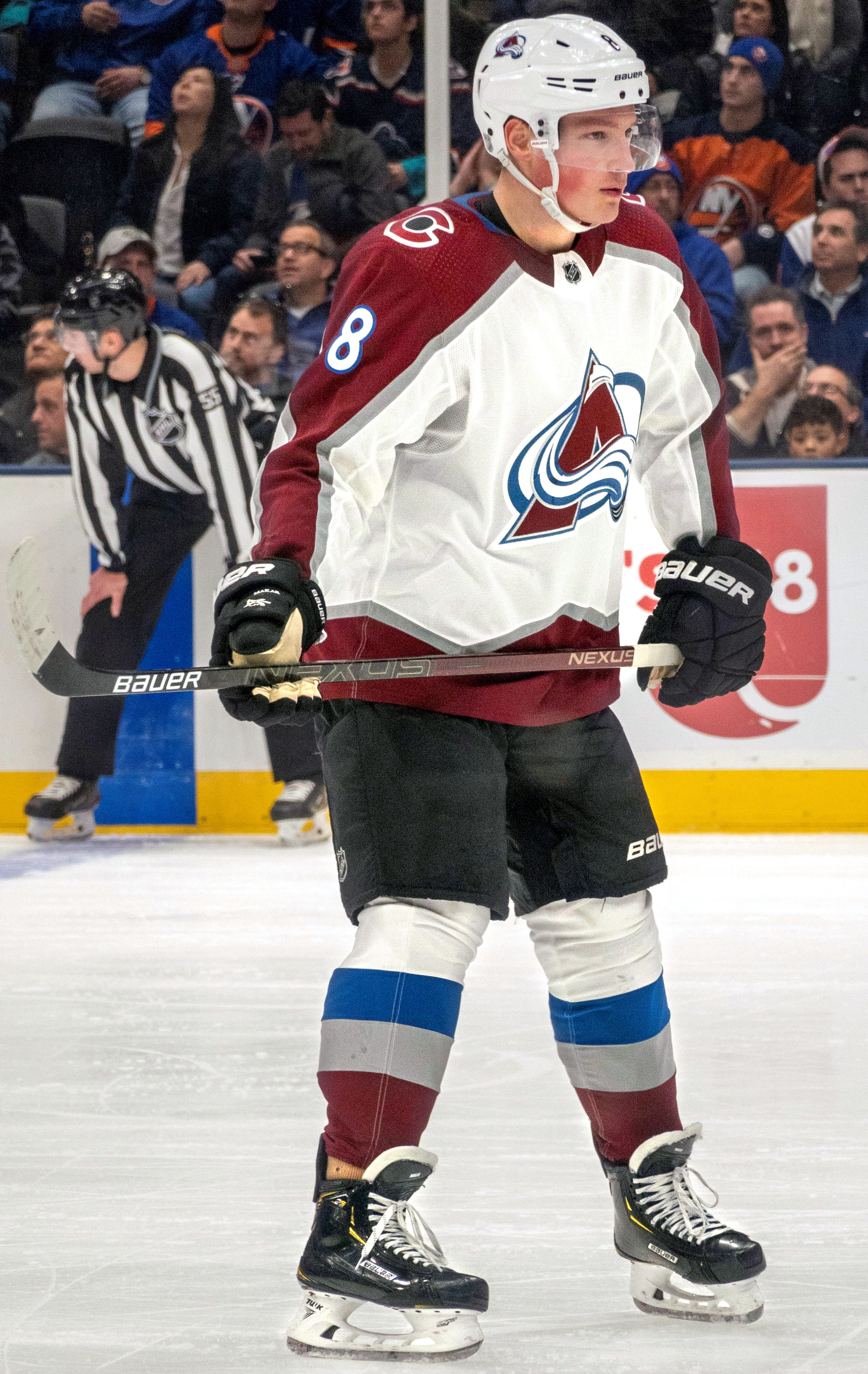
Cale Makar

- October 1 – Guilherme Costa, Brazilian swimmer
- October 2
  - Alessandro Miressi, Italian swimmer
  - Skilla Baby, American rapper
- October 5 – Exequiel Palacios, Argentine footballer
- October 7 – Trent Alexander-Arnold, English footballer
- October 9 – Joy Crookes, British singer
- October 10 – Fabio Di Giannantonio, Italian motorcycle racer
- October 14 – Kenny Bednarek, American sprinter
- October 17
  - Erin Kellyman, English actress
  - Devin Haney, American professional boxer
- October 19 – Katie Douglas, Canadian actress
- October 20 – Nikita Ababiy, American professional boxer
- October 22
  - Roddy Ricch, American rapper
  - Marcus Jones, American football cornerback
- October 23 – Amandla Stenberg, American actress and singer
- October 24 – Daya, American singer-songwriter
- October 25 – Lee Know, South Korean singer, rapper, and dancer
- October 27 – Dayot Upamecano, French footballer
- October 28
  - Nolan Gould, American actor
  - Perrine Laffont, French mogul skier
  - Spencer Strider, American baseball pitcher
- October 29
  - Maria Kharenkova, former Russian artistic gymnast
  - Lance Stroll, Canadian racing driver
- October 30 – Cale Makar, Canadian ice hockey player

=== November ===
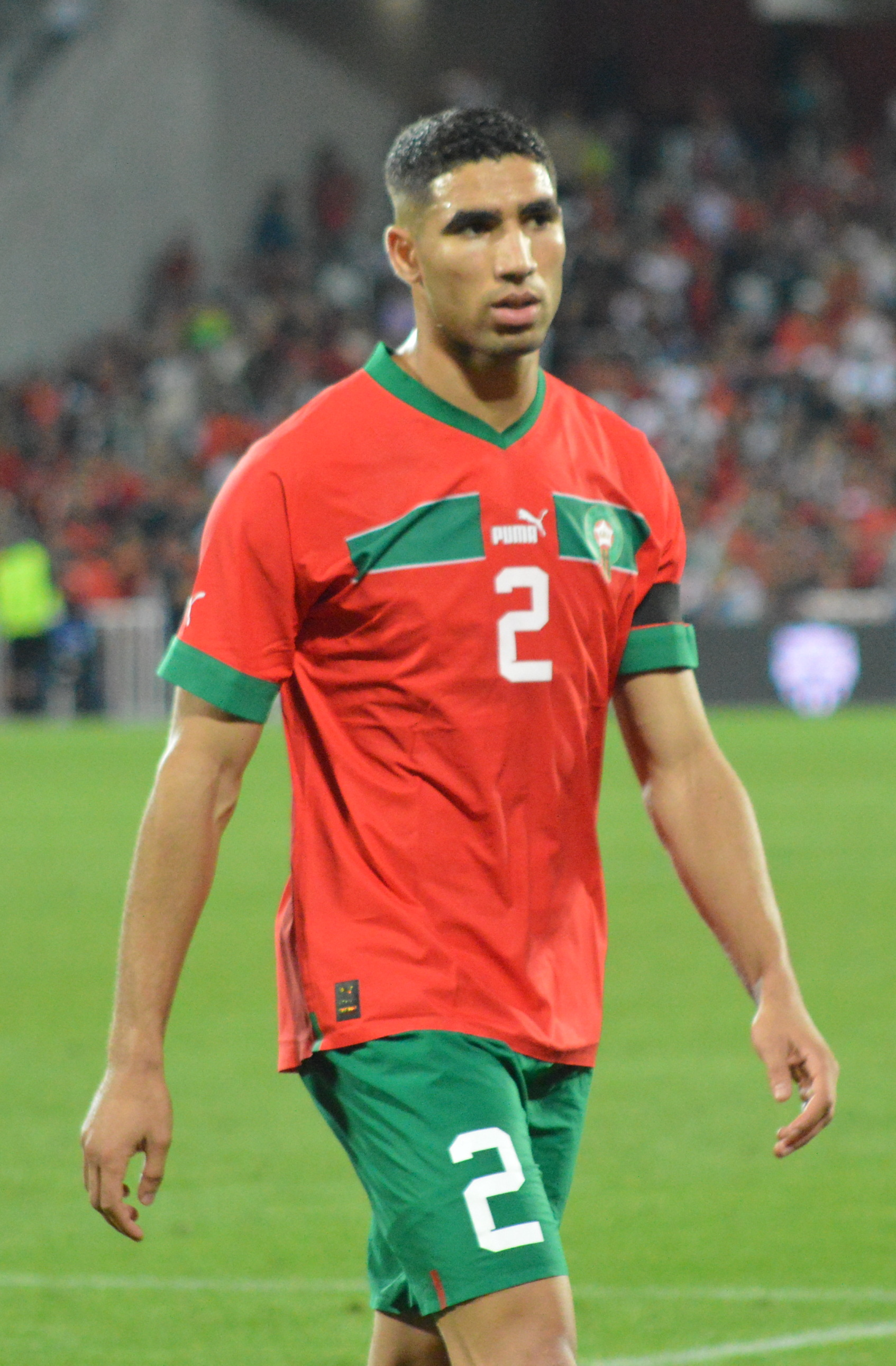
Achraf Hakimi

- November 1
  - Marie-Antoinette Katoto, French footballer
  - Rachel Chinouriri, English singer-songwriter
- November 2
  - Elkie, South Korean based singer and actress
  - Jordan Love, American football quarterback
- November 3 – Maddison Elliott, Australian paralympic swimmer
- November 4 – Achraf Hakimi, Moroccan footballer
- November 11 – Liudmila Samsonova, Russian tennis player
- November 12
  - Marco Bezzecchi, Italian motorcycle racer
  - Jules Koundé, French footballer
  - Elias Pettersson, Swedish ice hockey player
  - Omar Rudberg, Venezuelan-Swedish singer and actor
- November 14
  - Sofia Kenin, American tennis player
  - DeVonta Smith, American football wide receiver
  - Anna Henderson, British racing cyclist
- November 16 – Hannah Mae, Dutch singer-songwriter
- November 17 – Kara Hayward, American actress
- November 21 – Vangelis Pavlidis, Greek footballer
- November 22 – Casey Mittelstadt, American ice hockey player
- November 23 – Bradley Steven Perry, American actor
- November 25 – Jaylen Waddle, American football wide receiver
- November 28 – Alice Bellandi, Italian judoka
- November 29
  - Ayumu Hirano, Japanese snowboarder
  - Lovie Simone, American actress

=== December ===
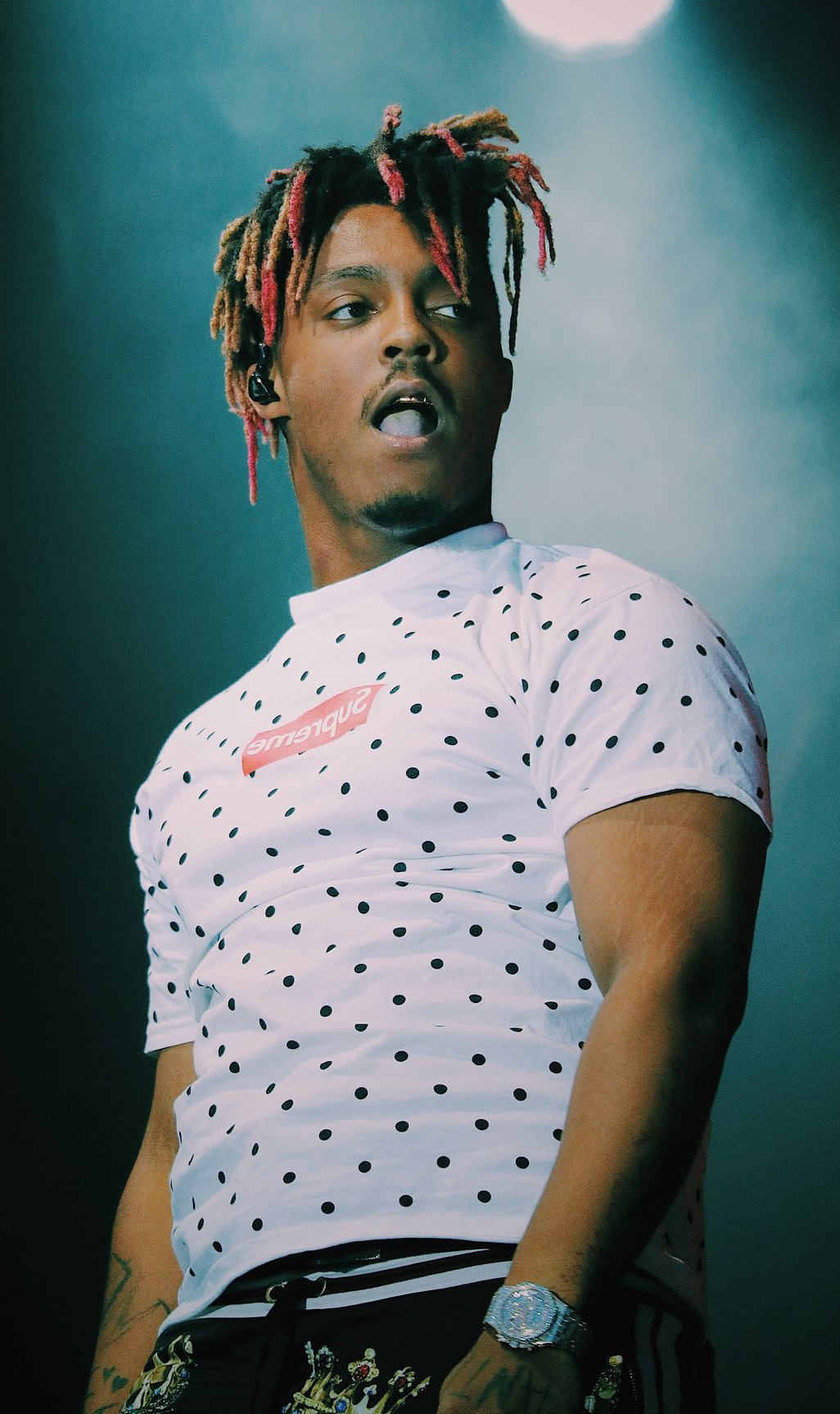
Juice Wrld

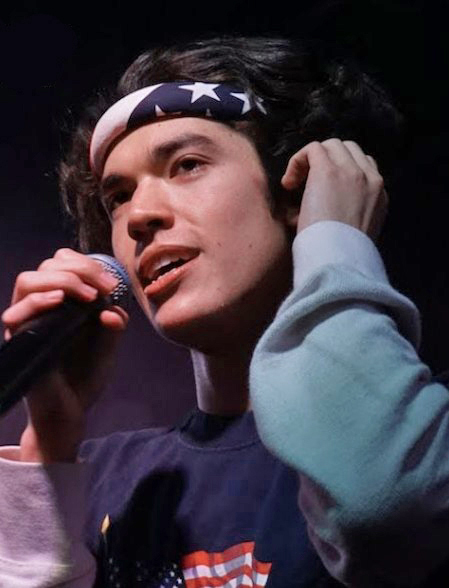
Conan Gray

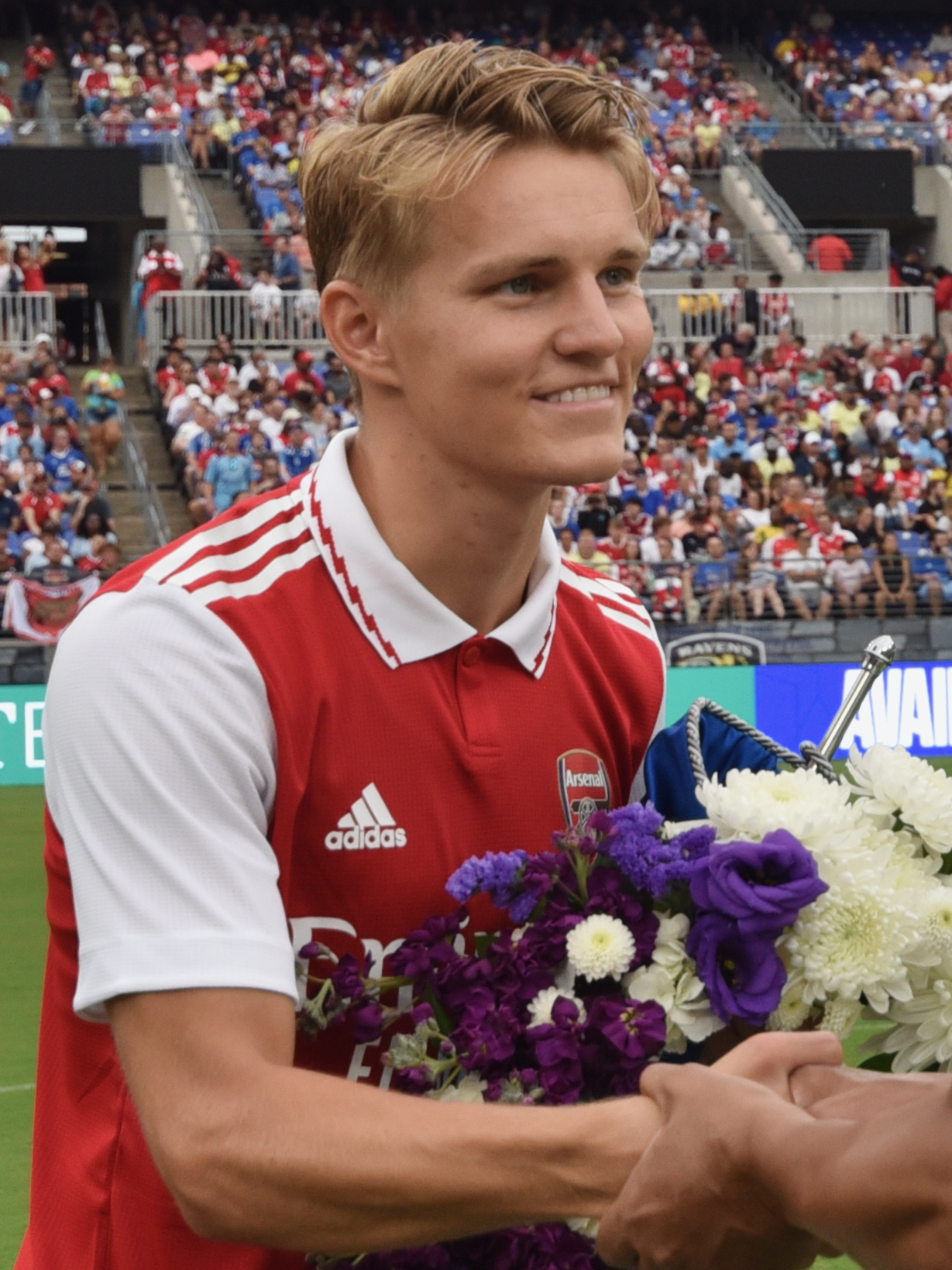
Martin Ødegaard

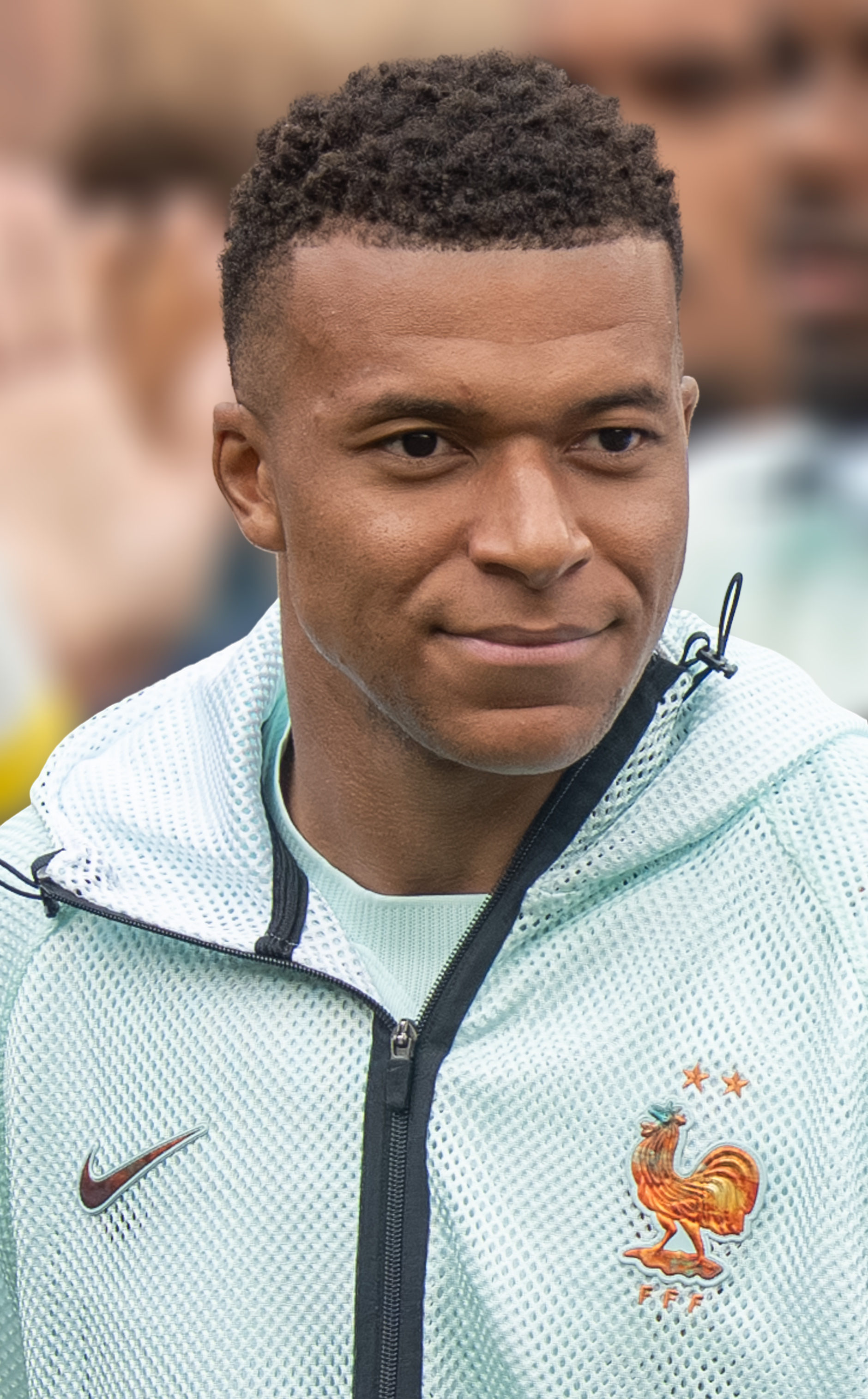
Kylian Mbappé

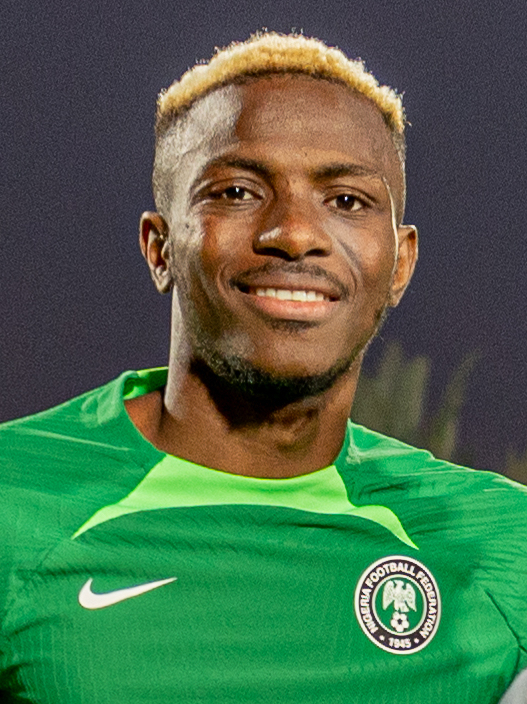
Victor Osimhen

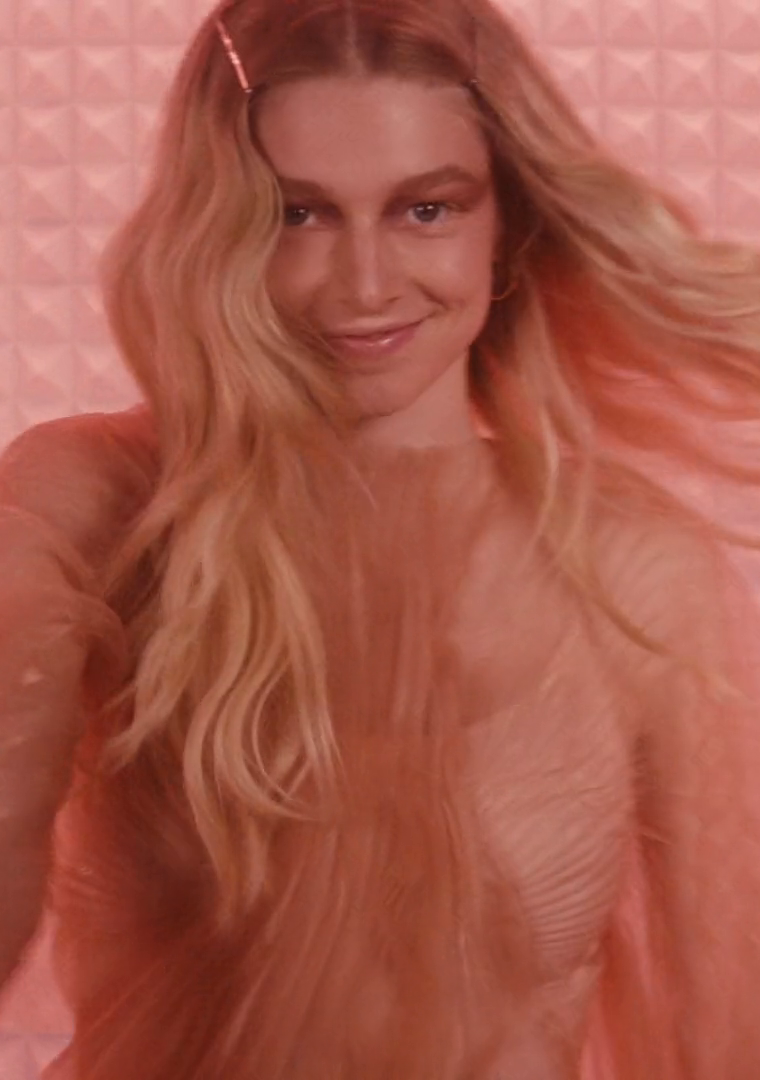
Hunter Schafer

- December 2
  - Juice Wrld, American rapper and singer (d. 2019)
  - Annalise Basso, American actress
  - Celeste O'Connor, Kenyan-American actress
- December 4 – Si Yajie, Chinese diver
- December 5
  - Conan Gray, American singer
  - Randal Kolo Muani, French footballer
- December 6 – Joe Fraser, British artistic gymnast
- December 8 – Matthew Wilson, Australian swimmer
- December 14
  - Maggie Voisin, American freestyle skier
  - Lukas Nmecha, German footballer
  - Lonnie Walker IV, American basketball player
- December 16
  - Zhou Jieqiong, Chinese singer
  - Clara Moneke, Brazilian actress and model
- December 17 – Martin Ødegaard, Norwegian footballer
- December 18
  - Paola Egonu, Italian volleyball player
  - Simona Quadarella, Italian swimmer
  - Jake Oettinger, American ice hockey player
- December 19
  - Frans Jeppsson Wall, Swedish singer
  - King Princess, American singer, songwriter, and multi-instrumentalist
- December 20
  - Kylian Mbappé, French footballer
  - Dylan Wang, Chinese actor and singer
- December 22
  - G Hannelius, American actress and singer
  - Casper Ruud, Norwegian tennis player
- December 24
  - Alexis Mac Allister, Argentine football player
  - Declan McKenna, English singer-songwriter
- December 27 – He Jie, Chinese athlete
- December 28 – Jared Gilman, American actor
- December 29
  - Paris Berelc, American actress and model
  - Victor Osimhen, Nigerian footballer
- December 30 – Jutta Leerdam, Dutch speed skater
- December 31 – Hunter Schafer, American actress and model

== Nobel Prizes ==

- Physics – Robert B. Laughlin, Horst L. Störmer, Daniel Chee Tsui
- Chemistry – Walter Kohn, John Pople
- Medicine – Robert F. Furchgott, Louis J. Ignarro, Ferid Murad
- Literature – José Saramago
- Peace – John Hume and David Trimble
- Bank of Sweden Prize in Economic Sciences in Memory of Alfred Nobel – Amartya Sen

== Fields Medal ==
- Richard Ewen Borcherds, William Timothy Gowers, Maxim Kontsevich, Curtis T. McMullen
