= Eco-socialism =

Ideology merging socialism with green politics

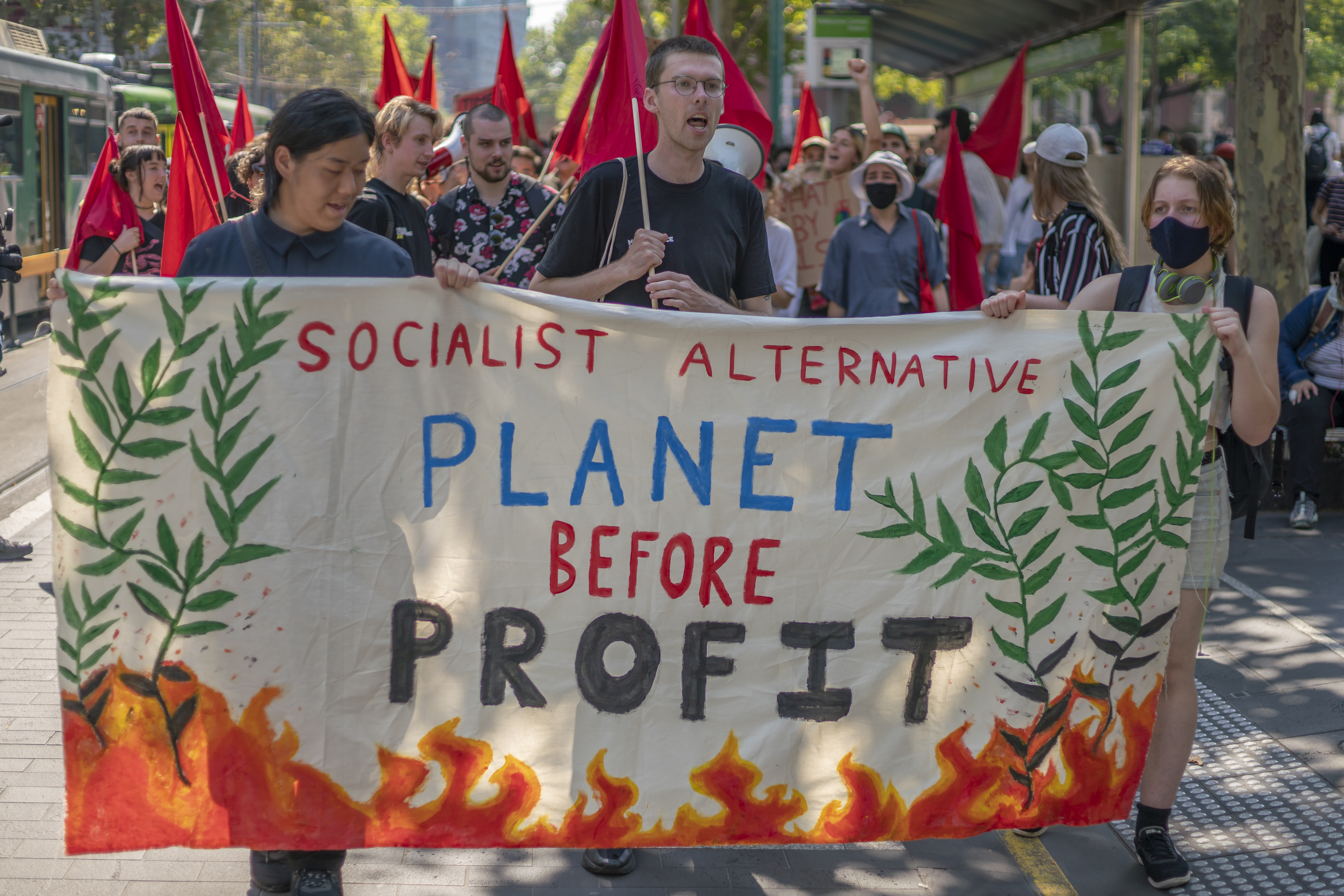
Socialist Alternative banner at the Global Climate Strike 2021 in Melbourne, Australia

Eco-socialism (also known as green socialism, socialist ecology, ecological materialism, or revolutionary ecology) is an ideology merging aspects of socialism with that of green politics, ecology and alter-globalization or anti-globalization. Eco-socialists generally believe that the expansion of the capitalist system is the cause of social exclusion, poverty, war and environmental degradation through globalization and imperialism, under the supervision of repressive states and transnational structures.

Eco-socialism asserts that the capitalist economic system is fundamentally incompatible with the ecological and social requirements of sustainability. Thus, according to this analysis, giving economic priority to the fulfillment of human needs while staying within ecological limits, as sustainable development demands, is in conflict with the structural workings of capitalism. By this logic, market-based solutions to ecological crises (such as environmental economics and green economy) are rejected as technical tweaks that do not confront capitalism's structural failures. Eco-socialists advocate for the succession of capitalism by eco-socialism—an egalitarian economic/political/social structure designed to harmonize human society with non-human ecology and to fulfill human needs—as the only sufficient solution to the present-day ecological crisis, and hence the only path towards sustainability.

Eco-socialists advocate dismantling capitalism, focusing on social ownership of the means of production by freely associated producers, and restoring the commons.

== Ideology ==
Eco-socialists are critical of many past and existing forms of both green politics and socialism. They are often described as "Red Greens" – adherents to Green politics with clear anti-capitalist views, often inspired by Marxism (red greens are in contrast to eco-capitalists and green anarchists).

Eco-socialists criticise bureaucratic and elite theories of self-described socialism such as Maoism, Stalinism and what other critics have termed bureaucratic collectivism or state capitalism. Instead, eco-socialists focus on imbuing socialism with ecology while keeping the emancipatory goals of "first-epoch" socialism. Eco-socialists aim for communal ownership of the means of production by "freely associated producers" with all forms of domination eclipsed, especially gender inequality and racism.

This often includes the restoration of commons land in opposition to private property, in which local control of resources valorizes the Marxist concept of use value above exchange value. Practically, eco-socialists have generated various strategies to mobilise action on an internationalist basis, developing networks of grassroots individuals and groups that can radically transform society through nonviolent "prefigurative projects" for a post-capitalist, post-statist world.

The term "watermelon" is commonly applied, often pejoratively, to Greens who seem to put "social justice" goals above ecological ones, implying they are "green on the outside but red on the inside". The term is common in Australia and New Zealand, and usually attributed to either Petr Beckmann or, more frequently, Warren T. Brookes, both critics of environmentalism. The term is also found in non-English speaking political discourse.

The Watermelon, a New Zealand website, uses the term proudly, stating that it is "green on the outside and liberal on the inside", while also citing "socialist political leanings", reflecting the use of the term "liberal" to describe the political left in many English-speaking countries. Red Greens are often considered "fundies" or "fundamentalist greens", a term usually associated with deep ecology even though the German Green Party "fundi" faction included eco-socialists, and eco-socialists in other Green Parties, like Derek Wall, have been described in the press as fundies.

=== Green left ===
The term green left refers primarily to a political affiliation that combines elements of green politics and left-wing politics in countries where the term is used. Largely synonymous with eco-socialism, it is primarily a social justice and human rights oriented ideology, with an expansion in focus to the rights of other species. It is often used in contrast with centre-left green parties, that attempt to reconcile their environmental goals with a capitalistic framework, and, rarely, center-right green parties (like the Latvian Green Party and Ecologist Green Party of Mexico), that hold anti-feminist views.

Examples of "green left" parties include GroenLinks in the Netherlands, the Green Party of the United States, the Left-Green Movement in Iceland, the Scottish Greens and the Green Party of Aotearoa New Zealand. The name "Green Left" is also used by a variety of organisations which espouse socialist or Marxist principles, but with a greater emphasis on environmental preservation.

Green left political parties or joint electoral lists have been formed in some countries, most often between Marxist and radical greens. In the Netherlands, the GroenLinks party was formed in 1989 by a merger of a communist, pacifist, left-wing Christian and green parties. In December 2007, an Italian electoral coalition of the radical left was formed known as The Left – The Rainbow, comprising Federation of the Greens, two communist parties and a small democratic socialist party. The green left has also been present in green politics outside of Europe, especially in the United States, Australia and New Zealand.

== History ==
=== 1880s–1930s ===
Contrary to the depiction of Karl Marx by some environmentalists, social ecologists and fellow socialists as a productivist who favoured the domination of nature, eco-socialists have revisited Marx's writings and believe that he "was a main originator of the ecological world-view". Eco-socialist authors, like John Bellamy Foster and Paul Burkett, point to Marx's discussion of a "metabolic rift" between man and nature, his statement that "private ownership of the globe by single individuals will appear quite absurd as private ownership of one man by another" and his observation that a society must "hand it [the planet] down to succeeding generations in an improved condition". Nonetheless, other eco-socialists feel that Marx overlooked a "recognition of nature in and for itself", ignoring its "receptivity" and treating nature as "subjected to labor from the start" in an "essentially active relationship".

William Morris, the English novelist, poet and designer, is largely credited with developing key principles of what was later called eco-socialism. During the 1880s and 1890s, Morris promoted his eco-socialist ideas within the Social Democratic Federation and the Socialist League.

Following the Russian Revolution, some environmentalists and environmental scientists attempted to integrate ecological consciousness into Bolshevism, although many such people were later purged from the Communist Party of the Soviet Union. The "pre-revolutionary environmental movement", encouraged by the revolutionary scientist Aleksandr Bogdanov and the Proletkul't organisation, made efforts to "integrate production with natural laws and limits" in the first decade of Soviet rule, before Joseph Stalin attacked ecologists and the science of ecology and the Soviet Union fell into the pseudo-science of the state biologist Trofim Lysenko, who "set about to rearrange the Russian map" in ignorance of environmental limits.

=== 1950s–1960s ===
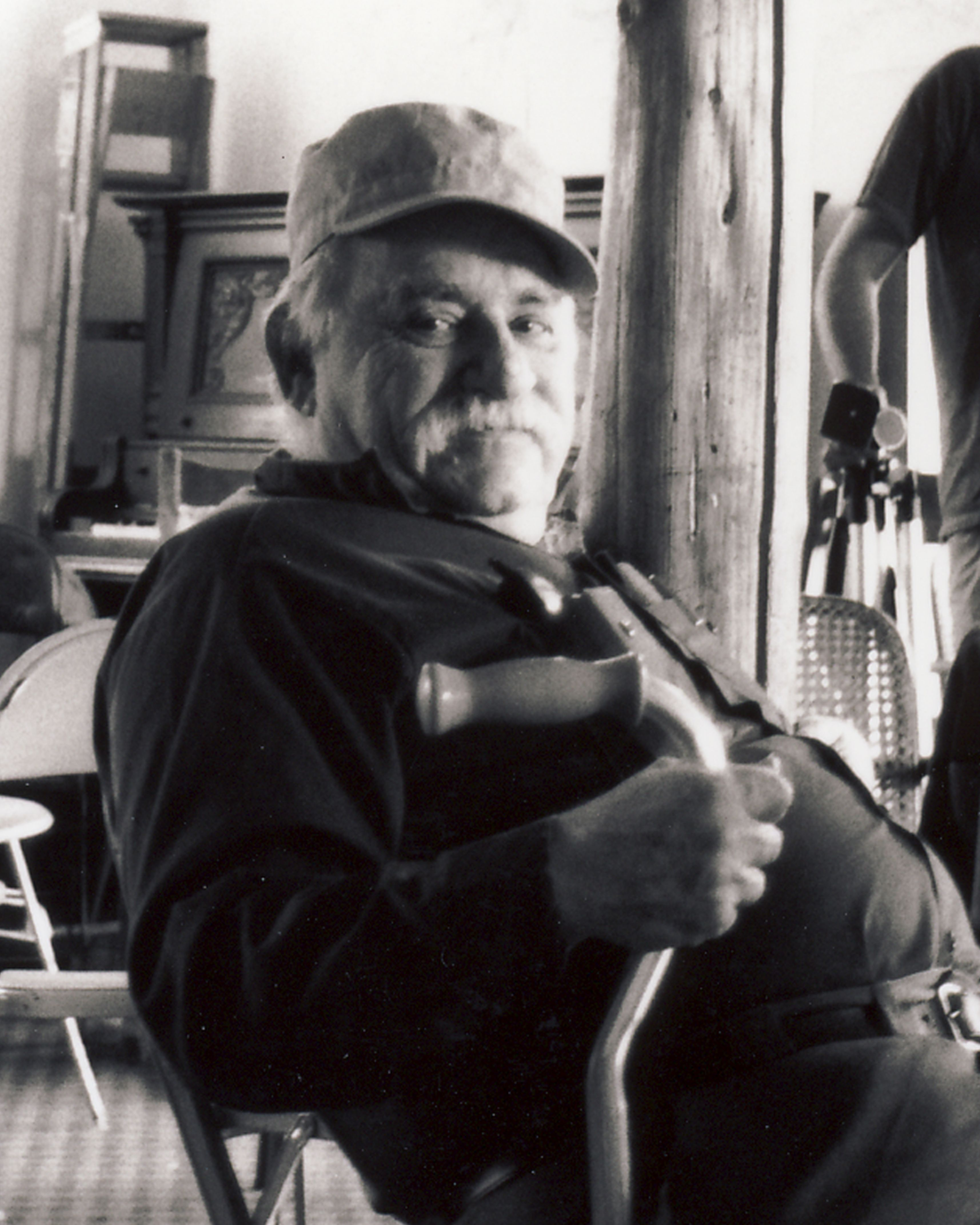
Murray Bookchin, who developed the theory of social ecology and the ideology of communalism

Social ecology is closely related to the work and ideas of Murray Bookchin and influenced by anarchist Peter Kropotkin. Social ecologists assert that the present ecological crisis has its roots in human social problems, and that the domination of human-over-nature stems from the domination of human-over-human. In 1958, Murray Bookchin defined himself as an anarchist, seeing parallels between anarchism and ecology. His first book, Our Synthetic Environment, was published under the pseudonym Lewis Herber in 1962, a few months before Rachel Carson's Silent Spring. The book described a broad range of environmental ills but received little attention because of its political radicalism. His groundbreaking essay "Ecology and Revolutionary Thought" introduced ecology as a concept in radical politics. In 1968, he founded another group that published the influential Anarchos magazine, which published that and other innovative essays on post-scarcity and on ecological technologies such as solar and wind energy, and on decentralization and miniaturization. Lecturing throughout the United States, he helped popularize the concept of ecology to the counterculture.

Post-Scarcity Anarchism is a collection of essays written by Murray Bookchin and first published in 1971 by Ramparts Press. It outlines the possible form anarchism might take under conditions of post-scarcity. It is one of Bookchin's major works, and its radical thesis provoked controversy for being utopian and messianic in its faith in the liberatory potential of technology. Bookchin argues that post-industrial societies are also post-scarcity societies, and can thus imagine "the fulfillment of the social and cultural potentialities latent in a technology of abundance". The self-administration of society is now made possible by technological advancement and, when technology is used in an ecologically sensitive manner, the revolutionary potential of society will be much changed. In 1982, his book The Ecology of Freedom had a profound impact on the emerging ecology movement, both in the United States and abroad. He was a principal figure in the Burlington Greens in 1986–1990, an ecology group that ran candidates for city council on a program to create neighborhood democracy.

Bookchin later developed a political philosophy to complement social ecology which he called "Communalism" (spelled with a capital "C" to differentiate it from other forms of communalism). While originally conceived as a form of social anarchism, he later developed Communalism into a separate ideology which incorporates what he saw as the most beneficial elements of Anarchism, Marxism, syndicalism, and radical ecology.

Politically, Communalists advocate a network of directly democratic citizens' assemblies in individual communities/cities organized in a confederal fashion. This method used to achieve this is called libertarian municipalism which involves the establishment of face-to-face democratic institutions which are to grow and expand confederally with the goal of eventually replacing the nation-state.

=== 1970s–1990s ===
In the 1970s, Barry Commoner, suggesting a left-wing response to The Limits to Growth model that predicted catastrophic resource depletion and spurred environmentalism, postulated that capitalist technologies were chiefly responsible for environmental degradation, as opposed to population pressures. East German dissident writer and activist Rudolf Bahro published two books addressing the relationship between socialism and ecology – The Alternative in Eastern Europe and Socialism and Survival – which promoted a 'new party' and led to his arrest, for which he gained international notoriety.

At around the same time, Alan Roberts, an Australian Marxist, posited that people's unfulfilled needs fuelled consumerism. Fellow Australian Ted Trainer further called upon socialists to develop a system that met human needs, in contrast to the capitalist system of created wants. A key development in the 1980s was the creation of the journal Capitalism, Nature, Socialism (CNS) with James O'Connor as founding editor and the first issue in 1988. The debates ensued led to a host of theoretical works by O'Connor, Carolyn Merchant, Paul Burkett and others.

The Australian Democratic Socialist Party launched the Green Left Weekly newspaper in 1991, following a period of working within Green Alliance and Green Party groups in formation. This ceased when the Australian Greens adopted a policy of proscription of other political groups in August 1991. The DSP also published a comprehensive policy resolution, "Socialism and Human Survival" in book form in 1990, with an expanded second edition in 1999 entitled "Environment, Capitalism & Socialism".

=== 1990s onwards ===
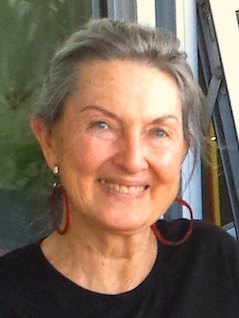
Ariel Salleh in 2019

The 1990s saw the socialist feminists Mary Mellor and Ariel Salleh address environmental issues within an eco-socialist paradigm. With the rising profile of the anti-globalization movement in the Global South, an environmentalism of the poor, combining ecological awareness and social justice, has also become prominent. David Pepper also released his important work, Ecosocialism: From Deep Ecology to Social Justice, in 1994, which critiques the current approach of many within Green politics, particularly deep ecologists.

In 2001, Joel Kovel, a social scientist, psychiatrist and former candidate for the Green Party of the United States (GPUS) presidential nomination in 2000, and Michael Löwy, an anthropologist and member of the Reunified Fourth International, released "An Ecosocialist Manifesto", which has been adopted by some organisations and suggests possible routes for the growth of eco-socialist consciousness. Kovel's 2002 work, The Enemy of Nature: The End of Capitalism or the End of the World?, is considered by many to be the most up-to-date exposition of eco-socialist thought.

In October 2007, the International Ecosocialist Network was founded in Paris.

=== Influence on current green and socialist movements ===
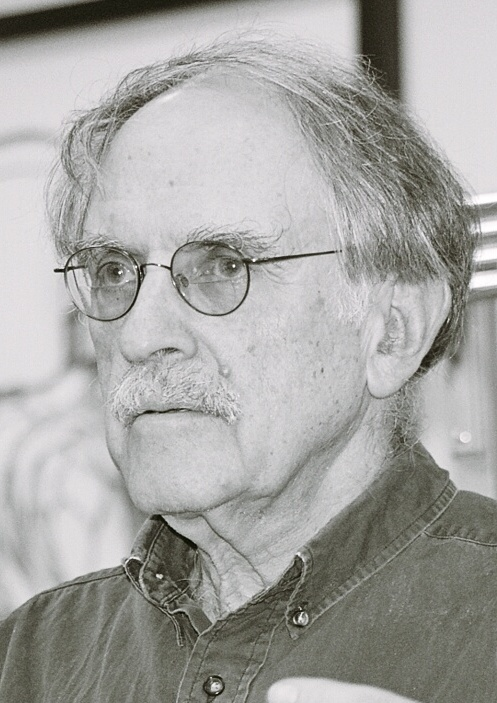
Joel Kovel in 2009

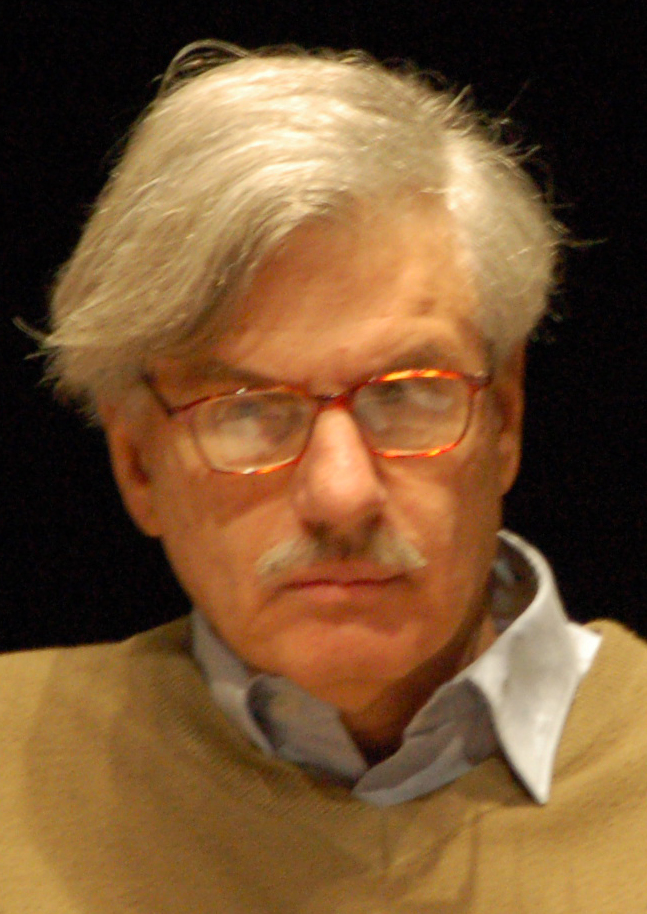
Michael Löwy in 2010

Currently, many Green Parties around the world, such as the Dutch Green Left Party (GroenLinks), contain strong eco-socialist elements. Radical Red-green alliances have been formed in many countries by eco-socialists, radical Greens and other radical left groups. In Denmark, the Red-Green Alliance was formed as a coalition of numerous radical parties. Within the European Parliament, a number of far-left parties from Northern Europe have organized themselves into the Nordic Green Left Alliance. Red Greens feature heavily in the Green Party of Saskatchewan (in Canada but not necessarily affiliated to the Green Party of Canada). In 2016, GPUS officially adopted eco-socialist ideology within the party.

The Green Party of England and Wales has an eco-socialist group, Green Left, founded in June 2006. Members of the Green Party holding a number of influential positions, including former Principal Speakers Siân Berry and Derek Wall, as well as prominent Green Party candidate and human rights activist Peter Tatchell have been associated with the grouping. Many Marxist organisations also contain eco-socialists, as evidenced by Löwy's involvement in the reunified Fourth International and Socialist Resistance, a British Marxist newspaper that reports on eco-socialist issues and has published two collections of essays on eco-socialist thought: Ecosocialism or Barbarism?, edited by Jane Kelly and Sheila Malone, and The Global Fight for Climate Justice, edited by Ian Angus with a foreword by Derek Wall.

=== Influence on existing socialist regimes ===
Eco-socialism has had a minor influence over developments in the environmental policies of what can be called "existing socialist" regimes, notably the People's Republic of China. Pan Yue, deputy director of the PRC's State Environmental Protection Administration, has acknowledged the influence of eco-socialist theory on his championing of environmentalism within China, which has gained him international acclaim (including being nominated for the Person of the Year Award 2006 by The New Statesman, a British current affairs magazine). Yue stated in an interview that, while he often finds eco-socialist theory "too idealistic" and lacking "ways of solving actual problems", he believes that it provides "political reference for China's scientific view of development", "gives socialist ideology room to expand" and offers "a theoretical basis for the establishment of fair international rules" on the environment.

He echoes much of eco-socialist thought, attacking international "environmental inequality", refusing to focus on technological fixes and arguing for the construction of "a harmonious, resource-saving and environmentally-friendly society". He also shows a knowledge of eco-socialist history, from the convergence of radical green politics and socialism and their political "red-green alliances" in the post-Soviet era. This focus on eco-socialism has informed in the essay On Socialist Ecological Civilisation, published in September 2006, which according to China Dialogue "sparked debate" in China.

The current Constitution of Bolivia, promulgated in 2009, is the first both ecologic and pro-socialist Constitution in the world, making the Bolivian state officially ecosocialist.

=== International organizations ===
In 2007 biologist David Schwartzman identified the necessity to build a transnational ecosocialist movement as one of the critical challenges facing ecosocialists. Later in 2007, it was announced that attempts to form an Ecosocialist International Network (EIN) would be made and an inaugural meeting of the International occurred on 7 October 2007 in Paris. The meeting attracted "more than 60 activists from Argentina, Australia, Belgium, Brazil, Canada, Cyprus, Denmark, France, Greece, Italy, Switzerland, United Kingdom, and the United States" and elected a steering committee featuring representatives from Britain, the United States, Canada, France, Greece, Argentina, Brazil and Australia, including Joel Kovel, Michael Löwy, Derek Wall, Ian Angus (editor of Climate and Capitalism in Canada) and Ariel Salleh. The Committee states that it wants "to incorporate members from China, India, Africa, Oceania and Eastern Europe". EIN held its second international conference in January 2009, in association with the next World Social Forum in Brazil. The conference released The Belem Ecosocialist Declaration.

International networking by eco-socialists has already been seen in the Praxis Research and Education Center, a group on international researchers and activists. Based in Moscow and established in 1997, Praxis, as well as publishing books "by libertarian socialists, Marxist humanists, anarchists, [and] syndicalists", running the Victor Serge Library and opposing war in Chechnya, states that it believes "that capitalism has brought life on the planet near to the brink of catastrophe, and that a form of ecosocialism needs to emerge to replace capitalism before it is too late".

== Critique of capitalist expansion and globalization ==
Merging aspects of Marxism, socialism, environmentalism and ecology, eco-socialists generally believe that the capitalist system is the cause of social exclusion, inequality and environmental degradation through globalization and imperialism under the supervision of repressive states and transnational structures.

In the "Ecosocialist Manifesto" (2001), Joel Kovel and Michael Löwy suggest that capitalist expansion causes "crises of ecology" through the "rampant industrialization" and "societal breakdown" that springs "from the form of imperialism known as globalization". They believe that capitalism's expansion "exposes ecosystems" to pollutants, habitat destruction and resource depletion, "reducing the sensuous vitality of nature to the cold exchangeability required for the accumulation of capital", while submerging "the majority of the world's people to a mere reservoir of labor power" as it penetrates communities through "consumerism and depoliticization".

Other eco-socialists like Derek Wall highlight how in the Global South free-market capitalist structures economies to produce export-geared crops that take water from traditional subsistence farms, increasing hunger and the likelihood of famine; furthermore, forests are increasingly cleared and enclosed to produce cash crops that separate people from their local means of production and aggravate poverty. Wall shows that many of the world's poor have access to the means of production through "non-monetised communal means of production", such as subsistence farming, but, despite providing for need and a level of prosperity, these are not included in conventional economics measures, like GNP.

Wall therefore views neo-liberal globalization as "part of the long struggle of the state and commercial interests to steal from those who subsist" by removing "access to the resources that sustain ordinary people across the globe". Furthermore, Kovel sees neoliberalism as "a return to the pure logic of capital" that "has effectively swept away measures which had inhibited capital's aggressivity, replacing them with naked exploitation of humanity and nature." For Kovel, this "tearing down of boundaries and limits to accumulation is known as globalization", which was "a deliberate response to a serious accumulation crisis (in the 1970s) that had convinced the leaders of the global economy to install what we know as neoliberalism."

Furthermore, Ramachandra Guha and Joan Martinez Alier blame globalization for creating increased levels of waste and pollution, and then dumping the waste on the most vulnerable in society, particularly those in the Global South. Others have also noted that capitalism disproportionately affects the poorest in the Global North as well, leading to examples of resistance such as the environmental justice movement in the United States, consisting of working-class people and ethnic minorities who highlight the tendency for waste dumps, major road projects and incinerators to be constructed around socially excluded areas. However, as Wall highlights, such campaigns are often ignored or persecuted precisely because they originate among the most marginalized in society: the African-American radical green religious group MOVE, campaigning for ecological revolution and animal rights from Philadelphia, had many members imprisoned or even killed by US authorities from the 1970s onwards.

Eco-socialism disagrees with the elite theories of capitalism, which tend to label a specific class or social group as conspirators who construct a system that satisfies their greed and personal desires. Instead, eco-socialists suggest that the very system itself is self-perpetuating, fuelled by "extra-human" or "impersonal" forces. Kovel uses the Bhopal industrial disaster as an example. Many anti-corporate observers would blame the avarice of those at the top of many multi-national corporations, such as the Union Carbide Corporation in Bhopal, for seemingly isolated industrial accidents. Conversely, Kovel suggests that Union Carbide were experiencing a decrease in sales that led to falling profits, which, due to stock market conditions, translated into a drop in share values. The depreciation of share value made many shareholders sell their stock, weakening the company and leading to cost-cutting measures that eroded the safety procedures and mechanisms at the Bhopal site. Though this did not, in Kovel's mind, make the Bhopal disaster inevitable, he believes that it illustrates the effect market forces can have on increasing the likelihood of ecological and social problems.

=== Use and exchange value ===
Eco-socialism focuses closely on Marx's theories about the contradiction between use values and exchange values. Kovel posits that, within a market, goods are not produced to meet needs but are produced to be exchanged for money that we then use to acquire other goods; as we have to keep selling in order to keep buying, we must persuade others to buy our goods just to ensure our survival, which leads to the production of goods with no previous use that can be sold to sustain our ability to buy other goods.

Such goods, in an eco-socialist analysis, produce exchange values but have no use value. Eco-socialists like Kovel stress that this contradiction has reached a destructive extent, where certain essential activities such as caring for relatives full-time and basic subsistence are unrewarded, while unnecessary commodities earn individuals huge fortunes and fuel consumerism and resource depletion.

=== "Second contradiction" of capitalism ===
James O'Connor argues for a "second contradiction" of underproduction, to complement Marx's "first" contradiction of capital and labor. While the second contradiction is often considered a theory of environmental degradation, O'Connor's theory in fact goes much further. Building on the work of Karl Polanyi, along with Marx, O'Connor argues that capitalism necessarily undermines the "conditions of production" necessary to sustain the endless accumulation of capital. These conditions of production include soil, water, energy, and so forth. But they also include an adequate public education system, transportation infrastructures, and other services that are not produced directly by capital, but which capital needs in order accumulate effectively. As the conditions of production are exhausted, the costs of production for capital increase. For this reason, the second contradiction generates an underproduction crisis tendency, with the rising cost of inputs and labor, to complement the overproduction tendency of too many commodities for too few customers. Like Marx's contradiction of capital and labor, the second contradiction therefore threatens the system's existence.

In addition, O'Connor believes that, in order to remedy environmental contradictions, the capitalist system innovates new technologies that overcome existing problems but introduce new ones.

O'Connor cites nuclear power as an example, which he sees as a form of producing energy that is advertised as an alternative to carbon-intensive, non-renewable fossil fuels, but creates long-term radioactive waste and other dangers to health and security. While O'Connor believes that capitalism is capable of spreading out its economic supports so widely that it can afford to destroy one ecosystem before moving onto another, he and many other eco-socialists now fear that, with the onset of globalization, the system is running out of new ecosystems. Kovel adds that capitalist firms have to continue to extract profit through a combination of intensive or extensive exploitation and selling to new markets, meaning that capitalism must grow indefinitely to exist, which he thinks is impossible on a planet of finite resources.

=== Role of the state and transnational organizations ===
Capitalist expansion is seen by eco-socialists as being "hand in glove" with "corrupt and subservient client states" that repress dissent against the system, governed by international organisations "under the overall supervision of the western powers and the superpower United States", which subordinate peripheral nations economically and militarily. Kovel further claims that capitalism itself spurs conflict and, ultimately, war. Kovel states that the "war on terror", between Islamist extremists and the United States, is caused by "oil imperialism", whereby the capitalist nations require control over sources of energy, especially oil, which are necessary to continue intensive industrial growth - in the quest for control of such resources, Kovel argues that the capitalist nations, specifically the United States, have come into conflict with the predominantly Muslim nations where oil is often found.

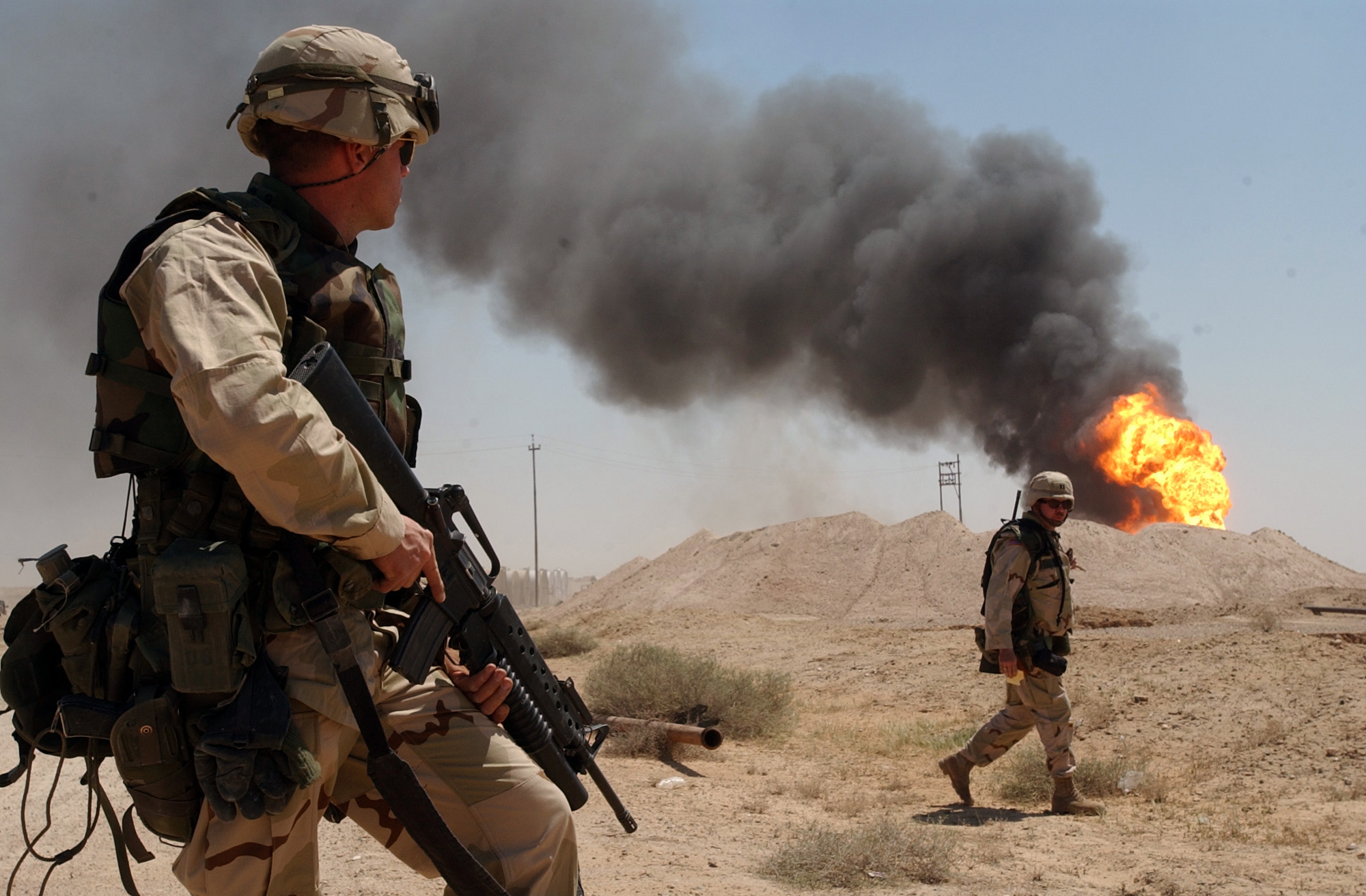
U.S. Army soldiers guarding a burning oil well in the Rumaila oil field during the US invasion of Iraq

Eco-socialists believe that state or self-regulation of markets does not solve the crisis "because to do so requires setting limits upon accumulation", which is "unacceptable" for a growth-orientated system; they believe that terrorism and revolutionary impulses cannot be tackled properly "because to do so would mean abandoning the logic of empire". Instead, eco-socialists feel that increasing repressive counter-terrorism increases alienation and causes further terrorism and believe that state counter-terrorist methods are, in Kovel and Löwy's words, "evolving into a new and malignant variation of fascism". They echo Rosa Luxemburg's "stark choice" between "socialism or barbarism", which was believed to be a prediction of the coming of fascism and further forms of destructive capitalism at the beginning of the twentieth century (Luxemburg was in fact murdered by the proto-fascist Freikorps in the revolutionary atmosphere of Germany in 1919). With individuals now declaring the choice is "ecosocialism or ecofascism".

== Critique of other forms of green politics ==
Eco-socialists criticise many within the Green movement for not being overtly anti-capitalist, for working within the existing capitalist, statist system, for voluntarism, or for reliance on technological fixes. The eco-socialist ideology is based on a critique of other forms of Green politics, including various forms of green economics, localism, deep ecology, bioregionalism and even some manifestations of radical green ideologies such as eco-feminism and social ecology.

As Kovel puts it, eco-socialism differs from Green politics at the most fundamental level because the 'Four Pillars' of Green politics (and the 'Ten Key Values' of the US Green Party) do not include the demand for the emancipation of labour and the end of the separation between producers and the means of production. Many eco-socialists also oppose Malthusianism and are alarmed by the gulf between Green politics in the Global North and the Global South.

=== Opposition to reformism and technologism ===
Eco-socialists are highly critical of those Greens who favour "working within the system". While eco-socialists like Kovel recognise the ability of within-system approaches to raise awareness, and believe that "the struggle for an ecologically rational world must include a struggle for the state", he believes that the mainstream Green movement is too easily co-opted by the current powerful socio-political forces as it "passes from citizen-based activism to ponderous bureaucracies scuffling for 'a seat at the table'".

For Kovel, capitalism is "happy to enlist" the Green movement for "convenience", "control over popular dissent" and "rationalization". He further attacks within-system green initiatives like carbon trading, which he sees as a "capitalist shell game" that turns pollution "into a fresh source of profit". Brian Tokar has further criticised carbon trading in this way, suggesting that it augments existing class inequality and gives the "largest 'players' ... substantial control over the whole 'game'".

In addition, Kovel criticises the "defeatism" of voluntarism in some local forms of environmentalism that do not connect: he suggests that they can be "drawn off into individualism" or co-opted to the demands of capitalism, as in the case of certain recycling projects, where citizens are "induced to provide free labor" to waste management industries who are involved in the "capitalization of nature". He labels the notion on voluntarism "ecopolitics without struggle".

Technological fixes to ecological problems are also rejected by eco-socialists. Saral Sarkar has updated the thesis of 1970s 'limits to growth' to exemplify the limits of new capitalist technologies such as hydrogen fuel cells, which require large amounts of energy to split molecules to obtain hydrogen. Furthermore, Kovel notes that "events in nature are reciprocal and multi-determined" and can therefore not be predictably "fixed"; socially, technologies cannot solve social problems because they are not "mechanical". He posits an eco-socialist analysis, developed from Marx, that patterns of production and social organisation are more important than the forms of technology used within a given configuration of society.

Under capitalism, he suggests that technology "has been the sine qua non of growth"; thus he believes that even in a world with hypothetical "free energy" the effect would be to lower the cost of automobile production, leading to the massive overproduction of vehicles, "collapsing infrastructure", chronic resource depletion and the "paving over" of the "remainder of nature". In the modern world, Kovel considers the supposed efficiency of new post-industrial commodities is a "plain illusion", as miniaturized components involve many substances and are therefore non-recyclable (and, theoretically, only simple substances could be retrieved by burning out-of-date equipment, releasing more pollutants). He is quick to warn "environmental liberals" against over-selling the virtues of renewable energies that cannot meet the mass energy consumption of the era; although he would still support renewable energy projects, he believes it is more important to restructure societies to reduce energy use before relying on renewable energy technologies alone.

=== Critique of green economics ===
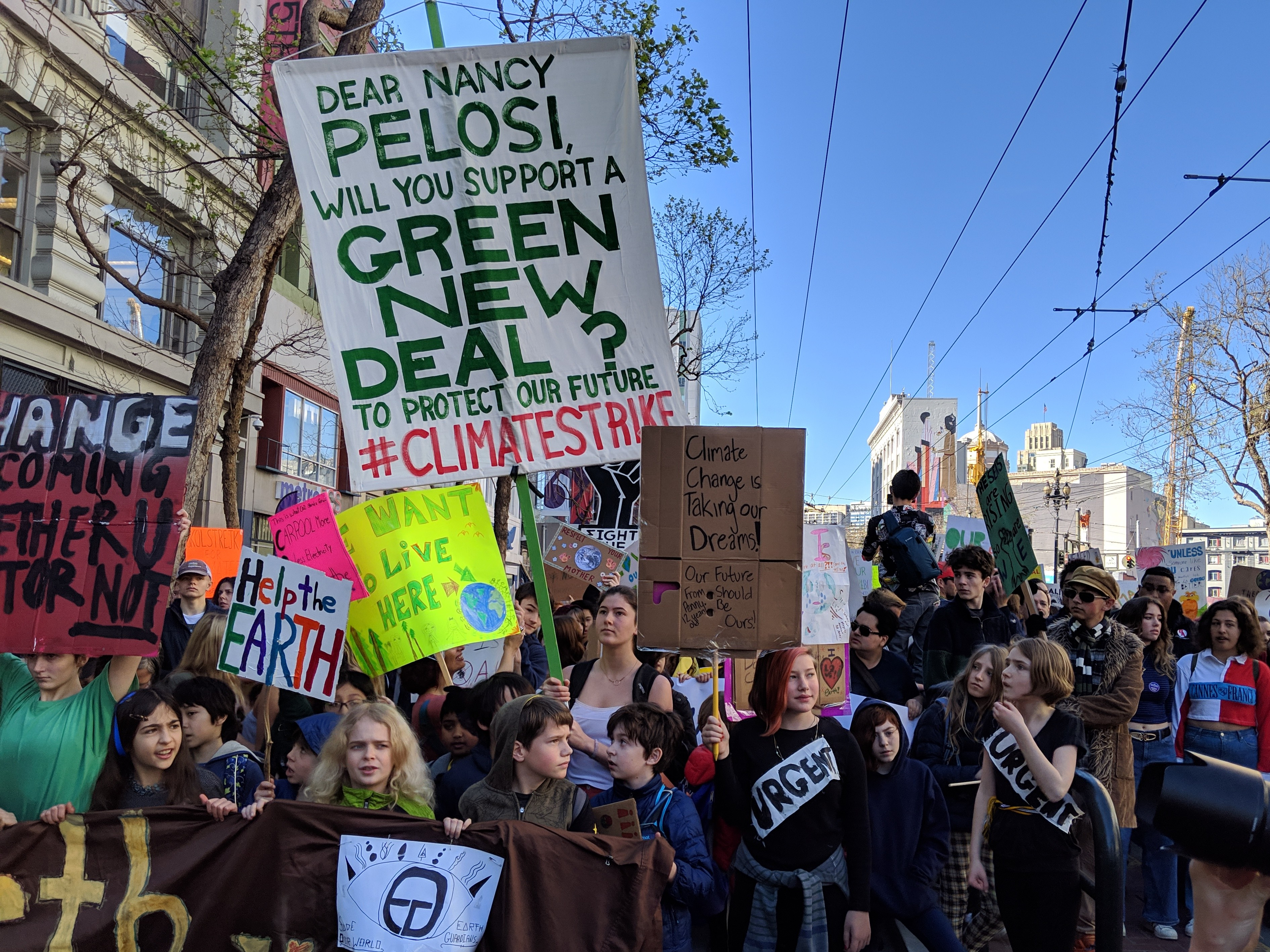
School strike in San Francisco on 15 March 2019, with a placard demanding economic action be taken in response to climate change

Eco-socialists have based their ideas for political strategy on a critique of several different trends in green economics. At the most fundamental level, eco-socialists reject what Kovel calls "ecological economics" or the "ecological wing of mainstream economics" for being "uninterested in social transformation". He further rejects the Neo-Smithian school, who believe in Adam Smith's vision of "a capitalism of small producers, freely exchanging with each other", which is self-regulating and competitive.

The school is represented by thinkers like David Korten who believe in "regulated markets" checked by government and civil society but, for Kovel, they do not provide a critique of the expansive nature of capitalism away from localised production and ignore "questions of class, gender or any other category of domination". Kovel also criticises their "fairy-tale" view of history, which refers to the abuse of "natural capital" by the materialism of the Scientific Revolution, an assumption that, in Kovel's eyes, seems to suggest that "nature had toiled to put the gift of capital into human hands", rather than capitalism being a product of social relations in human history.

Other forms of community-based economics are also rejected by eco-socialists such as Kovel, including followers of E. F. Schumacher and some members of the cooperative movement, for advocating "no more than a very halting and isolated first step". He thinks that their principles are "only partially realizable within the institutions of cooperatives in capitalist society" because "the internal cooperation" of cooperatives is "forever hemmed in and compromised" by the need to expand value and compete within the market. Marx also believed that cooperatives within capitalism make workers into "their own capitalist ... by enabling them to use the means of production for the employment of their own labour".

For Kovel and other eco-socialists, community-based economics and Green localism are "a fantasy" because "strict localism belongs to the aboriginal stages of society" and would be an "ecological nightmare at present population levels" due to "heat losses from a multitude of dispersed sites, the squandering of scarce resources, the needless reproduction of effort, and cultural impoverishment". While he feels that small-scale production units are "an essential part of the path towards an ecological society", he sees them not as "an end in itself"; in his view, small enterprises can be either capitalist or socialist in their configuration and therefore must be "consistently anti-capitalist", through recognition and support of the emancipation of labour, and exist "in a dialectic with the whole of things", as human society will need large-scale projects, such as transport infrastructures.

He highlights the work of steady-state theorist Herman Daly, who exemplifies what eco-socialists see as the good and bad points of ecological economics — while Daly offers a critique of capitalism and a desire for "workers ownership", he only believes in workers ownership "kept firmly within a capitalist market", ignoring the eco-socialist desire for struggle in the emancipation of labour and hoping that the interests of labour and management today can be improved so that they are "in harmony".

=== Critique of deep ecology ===
Despite the inclusion of both in political factions like the fundies of the German Green Party, eco-socialists and deep ecologists hold markedly opposite views. Eco-socialists like Kovel have attacked deep ecology because, like other forms of Green politics and green economics, it features "virtuous souls" who have "no internal connection with the critique of capitalism and the emancipation of labor". Kovel is particularly scathing about deep ecology and its "fatuous pronouncement" that Green politics is "neither left nor right, but ahead", which for him ignores the notion that "that which does not confront the system becomes its instrument".

Even more scathingly, Kovel suggests that in "its effort to decentre humanity within nature", deep ecologists can "go too far" and argue for the "splitting away of unwanted people", as evidenced by their desire to preserve wilderness by removing the groups that have lived there "from time immemorial". Kovel thinks that this lends legitimacy to "capitalist elites", like the United States State Department and the World Bank, who can make preservation of wilderness a part of their projects that "have added value as sites for ecotourism" but remove people from their land. Between 1986 and 1996, Kovel notes that over three million people were displaced by "conservation projects"; in the making of the national parks of the United States, three hundred Shoshone Indians were killed in the development of Yosemite.

Kovel believes that deep ecology has affected the rest of the Green movement and led to calls for restrictions on immigration, "often allying with reactionaries in a ... cryptically racist quest". Indeed, he finds traces of deep ecology in the "biological reduction" of Nazism, an ideology many "organicist thinkers" have found appealing, including Herbert Gruhl, a founder of the German Green Party (who subsequently left when it became more left-wing) and originator of the phrase "neither left nor right, but ahead". Kovel warns that, while 'ecofascism' is confined to a narrow band of far right intellectuals and "disaffected white power skinheads" who involved themselves alongside far left groups in the anti-globalization movement, it may be "imposed as a revolution from above to install an authoritarian regime in order to preserve the main workings of the system" in times of crisis.

=== Critique of bioregionalism ===
Bioregionalism, a philosophy developed by writers like Kirkpatrick Sale who believe in the self-sufficiency of "appropriate bioregional boundaries" drawn up by inhabitants of "an area", has been thoroughly critiqued by Kovel, who fears that the "vagueness" of the area will lead to conflict and further boundaries between communities. While Sale cites the bioregional living of Native Americans, Kovel notes that such ideas are impossible to translate to populations of modern proportions, and evidences the fact that Native Americans held land in commons, rather than private property – thus, for eco-socialists, bioregionalism provides no understanding of what is needed to transform society, and what the inevitable "response of the capitalist state" would be to people constructing bioregionalism.

Kovel also attacks the problems of self-sufficiency. Where Sale believes in self-sufficient regions "each developing the energy of its peculiar ecology", such as "wood in the northwest [US]", Kovel asks "how on earth" these can be made sufficient for regional needs, and notes the environmental damage of converting Seattle into a "forest-destroying and smoke-spewing wood-burning" city. Kovel also questions Sale's insistence on bioregions that do "not require connections with the outside, but within strict limits", and whether this precludes journeys to visit family members and other forms of travel.

=== Critique of variants of eco-feminism ===
Like many variants of socialism and Green politics, eco-socialists recognise the importance of "the gendered bifurcation of nature" and support the emancipation of gender as it "is at the root of patriarchy and class". Nevertheless, while Kovel believes that "any path out of capitalism must also be eco-feminist", he criticises types of ecofeminism that are not anti-capitalist and can "essentialize women's closeness to nature and build from there, submerging history into nature", becoming more at place in the "comforts of the New Age Growth Centre". These limitations, for Kovel, "keep ecofeminism from becoming a coherent social movement".

=== Critique of social ecology ===
While having much in common with the radical tradition of social ecology, eco-socialists still see themselves as distinct. Kovel believes this is because social ecologists see hierarchy "in-itself" as the cause of ecological destruction, whereas eco-socialists focus on the gender and class domination embodied in capitalism and recognise that forms of authority that are not "an expropriation of human power for ... self-aggrandizement", such as a student-teacher relationship that is "reciprocal and mutual", are beneficial.

In practice, Kovel describes social ecology as continuing the anarchist tradition of non-violent direct action, which is "necessary" but "not sufficient" because "it leaves unspoken the question of building an ecological society beyond capital". Furthermore, social ecologists and anarchists tend to focus on the state alone, rather than the class relations behind state domination (in the view of Marxists). Kovel fears that this is political, springing from historical hostility to Marxism among anarchists, and sectarianism, which he points out as a fault of the "brilliant" but "dogmatic" founder of social ecology, Murray Bookchin.

=== Opposition to Malthusianism and neo-Malthusianism ===
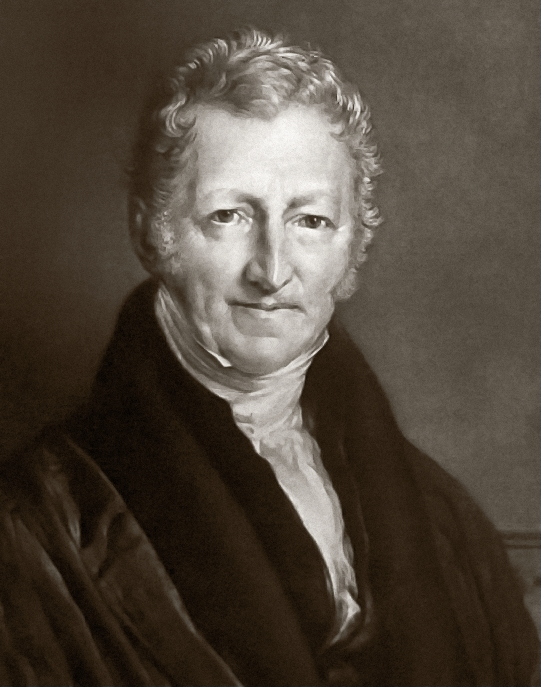
Thomas Robert Malthus, 18th century economist whose ideas Malthusianism is named after

While Malthusianism and eco-socialism overlap within the Green movement because both address over-industrialism, and despite the fact that eco-socialists, like many within the Green movement, are described as neo-Malthusian because of their criticism of economic growth, eco-socialists are opposed to Malthusianism. This divergence stems from the difference between Marxist and Malthusian examinations of social injustice – whereas Marx blames inequality on class injustice, Malthus argued that the working-class remained poor because of their greater fertility and birth rates.

Neo-Malthusians have slightly modified this analysis by increasing their focus on overconsumption – nonetheless, eco-socialists find this attention inadequate. They point to the fact that Malthus did not thoroughly examine ecology and that Garrett Hardin, a key neo-Malthusian, suggested that further enclosed and privatised land, as opposed to commons, would solve the chief environmental problem, which Hardin labeled the 'tragedy of the commons'.

=== "Two varieties of environmentalism" ===
Joan Martinez-Alier and Ramachandra Guha attack the gulf between what they see as the two "varieties of environmentalism" – the environmentalism of the North, an aesthetic environmentalism that is the privilege of wealthy people who no longer have basic material concerns, and the environmentalism of the South, where people's local environment is a source of communal wealth and such issues are a question of survival. Nonetheless, other eco-socialists, such as Wall, have also pointed out that capitalism disproportionately affects the poorest in the Global North as well, leading to examples of resistance such as the environmental justice movement in the US and groups like MOVE.

== Critique of other forms of socialism ==
Eco-socialists choose to use the term "socialist", despite "the failings of its twentieth century interpretations", because it "still stands for the supersession of capital" and thus "the name, and the reality" must "become adequate for this time". Eco-socialists have nonetheless often diverged with other Marxist movements. Eco-socialism has also been partly influenced by and associated with agrarian socialism as well as some forms of Christian socialism, especially in the United States.

=== Critique of actually existing socialism ===
China's Great Green Wall initiative is an ecological project that aims to provide windbreaking forest strips to hold back the expansion of the Gobi Desert.

While many see socialism as a necessity to respond to the environmental challenges brought about by capitalism, and saw hope in the Soviet Union and other such socialist states in providing an environmental path forward, others have critiqued the history and policies of such states for their lack of environmental planning and policy.

For Kovel and Michael Löwy, eco-socialism is "the realization of the 'first-epoch' socialisms" by resurrecting the notion of "free development of all producers", and distancing themselves from "the attenuated, reformist aims of social democracy and the productivist structures of the bureaucratic variations of socialism", such as forms of Leninism and Stalinism. They ground the failure of past socialist movements in "underdevelopment in the context of hostility by existing capitalist powers", which led to "the denial of internal democracy" and "emulation of capitalist productivism". Kovel believes that the forms of 'actually existing socialism' consisted of "public ownership of the means of production", rather than meeting "the true definition" of socialism as "a free association of producers", with the Party-State bureaucracy acting as the "alienating substitute 'public'".

In analysing the Russian Revolution, Kovel feels that "conspiratorial" revolutionary movements "cut off from the development of society" will "find society an inert mass requiring leadership from above". From this, he notes that the anti-democratic Tsarist heritage meant that the Bolsheviks, who were aided into power by World War One, were a minority who, when faced with a counter-revolution and invading Western powers, continued "the extraordinary needs of 'war communism'", which "put the seal of authoritarianism" on the revolution; thus, for Kovel, Lenin and Trotsky "resorted to terror", shut down the Soviets (workers' councils) and emulated "capitalist efficiency and productivism as a means of survival", setting the stage for Stalinism.

In Kovel's eyes, Lenin came to oppose the nascent Bolshevik environmentalism and its champion Aleksandr Bogdanov, who was later attacked for "idealism"; Kovel describes Lenin's philosophy as "a sharply dualistic materialism, rather similar to the Cartesian separation of matter and consciousness, and perfectly tooled ... to the active working over of the dead, dull matter by the human hand", which led him to want to overcome Russian backwardness through rapid industrialization. This tendency was, according to Kovel, augmented by a desire to catch-up with the West and the "severe crisis" of the revolution's first years.

Furthermore, Kovel quotes Trotsky, who believed in a Communist "superman" who would "learn how to move rivers and mountains". Kovel believes that, in Stalin's "revolution from above" and mass terror in response to the early 1930s economic crisis, Trotsky's writings "were given official imprimatur", despite the fact that Trotsky himself was eventually purged, as Stalinism attacked "the very notion of ecology... in addition to ecologies". Kovel adds that Stalin "would win the gold medal for enmity to nature", and that, in the face of massive environmental degradation, the inflexible Soviet bureaucracy became increasingly inefficient and unable to emulate capitalist accumulation, leading to a "vicious cycle" that led to its collapse.

Other scholars, such as John Barkdull and Paul G. Harris, have also criticised the industrial practices of socialist states like China, where it has rejected responsibility for reducing its reliance fossil fuels.

=== Critique of the wider socialist movement ===
Beyond the forms of "actually existing socialism", Kovel criticises socialists in general as treating ecology "as an afterthought" and holding "a naive faith in the ecological capacities of a working-class defined by generations of capitalist production". He cites David McNally, who advocates increasing consumption levels under socialism, which, for Kovel, contradicts any notion of natural limits. He also criticises McNally's belief in releasing the "positive side of capital's self-expansion" after the emancipation of labor; instead, Kovel argues that a socialist society would "seek not to become larger" but would rather become "more realized", choosing sufficiency and eschewing economic growth. Kovel further adds that the socialist movement was historically conditioned by its origins in the era of industrialization so that, when modern socialists like McNally advocate a socialism that "cannot be at the expense of the range of human satisfaction", they fail "to recognize that these satisfactions can be problematic with respect to nature when they have been historically shaped by the domination of nature".

== Eco-socialist strategy ==
Eco-socialists generally advocate the non-violent dismantling of capitalism and the state, focusing on collective ownership of the means of production by freely associated producers and restoration of the commons. To get to an eco-socialist society, eco-socialists advocate working-class anti-capitalist resistance but also believe that there is potential for agency in autonomous, grassroots individuals and groups across the world who can build "prefigurative" projects for non-violent radical social change.

These prefigurative steps go "beyond the market and the state" and base production on the enhancement of use values, leading to the internationalization of resistance communities in an 'Eco-socialist Party' or network of grassroots groups focused on non-violent, radical social transformation. An 'Eco-socialist revolution' is then carried out.

=== Agency ===
Many eco-socialists, like Alan Roberts, have encouraged working-class action and resistance, such as the 'green ban' movement in which workers refuse to participate in projects that are ecologically harmful. Similarly, Kovel and Hans A. Baer focus on working-class involvement in the formation of new eco-socialist parties or their increased involvement in existing Green Parties; however, he believes that, unlike many other forms of socialist analysis, "there is no privileged agent" or revolutionary class, and that there is potential for agency in numerous autonomous, grassroots individuals and groups who can build "prefigurative" projects for non-violent radical social change. He defines "prefiguration" as "the potential for the given to contain the lineaments of what is to be", meaning that "a moment toward the future exists embedded in every point of the social organism where a need arises".

If "everything has prefigurative potential", Kovel notes that forms of potential ecological production will be "scattered", and thus suggests that "the task is to free them and connect them". While all "human ecosystems" have "ecosocialist potential", Kovel points out that ones such as the World Bank have low potential, whereas internally democratic anti-globalization "affinity groups" have a high potential through a dialectic that involves the "active bringing and holding together of negations", such as the group acting as an alternative institution ("production of an ecological/socialist alternative") and trying to shut down a G8 summit meeting ("resistance to capital"). Therefore, "practices that in the same motion enhance use-values and diminish exchange-values are the ideal" for eco-socialists.

=== Prefiguration ===
For Kovel, the main prefigurative steps "are that people ruthlessly criticize the capitalist system... and that they include in this a consistent attack on the widespread belief that there can be no alternative to it", which will then "delegitimate the system and release people into struggle". Kovel justifies this by stating that "radical criticism of the given... can be a material force", even without an alternative, "because it can seize the mind of the masses of people", leading to "dynamic" and "exponential", rather than "incremental" and "linear", victories that spread rapidly. Following this, he advocates the expansion of the dialectical eco-socialist potential of groups through sustaining the confrontation and internal cohesion of human ecosystems, leading to an "activation" of potentials in others that will "spread across the whole social field" as "a new set of orienting principles" that define an ideology or "'party-life' formation".

In the short-term, eco-socialists like Kovel advocate activities that have the "promise of breaking down the commodity form". This includes organizing labor, which is a "reconfiguring of the use-value of labor power"; forming cooperatives, allowing "a relatively free association of labor"; forming localised currencies, which he sees as "undercutting the value-basis of money"; and supporting "radical media" that, in his eyes, involve an "undoing of the fetishism of commodities". Arran Gare, Wall and Kovel have advocated economic localisation in the same vein as many in the Green movement, although they stress that it must be a prefigurative step rather than an end in itself.

Kovel also advises political parties attempting to "democratize the state" that there should be "dialogue but no compromise" with established political parties, and that there must be "a continual association of electoral work with movement work" to avoid "being sucked back into the system". Such parties, he believes, should focus on "the local rungs of the political system" first, before running national campaigns that "challenge the existing system by the elementary means of exposing its broken promises". These views on party action have been supported by other eco-socialists.

Kovel believes in building prefigurations around forms of production based on use values, which will provide a practical vision of a post-capitalist, post-statist system. Such projects include Indymedia ("a democratic rendering of the use-values of new technologies such as the Internet, and a continual involvement in wider struggle"), open-source software, Wikipedia, public libraries and many other initiatives, especially those developed within the anti-globalization movement. These strategies, in Wall's words, "go beyond the market and the state" by rejecting the supposed dichotomy between private enterprise and state-owned production, while also rejecting any combination of the two through a mixed economy. He states that these present forms of "amphibious politics", which are "half in the dirty water of the present but seeking to move on to a new, unexplored territory". Löwy also highlights acting with a post-statist view saying that eco-socialists should take inspiration from Marx's commentary on the Paris Commune.

Wall suggests that open-source software, for example, opens up "a new form of commons regime in cyberspace", which he praises as production "for the pleasure of invention" that gives "access to resources without exchange". He believes that open source has "bypassed" both the market and the state, and could provide "developing countries with free access to vital computer software". Furthermore, he suggests that an "open source economy" means that "the barrier between user and provider is eroded", allowing for "cooperative creativity". He links this to Marxism and the notion of usufruct, asserting that "Marx would have been a Firefox user".

=== Internationalization of prefiguration and the eco-socialist party ===
Many eco-socialists have noted that the potential for building such projects is easier for media workers than for those in heavy industry because of the decline in trade unionism and the globalized division of labor which divides workers. Kovel posits that class struggle is "internationalized in the face of globalization", as evidenced by a wave of strikes across the Global South in the first half of the year 2000; indeed, he says that "labor's most cherished values are already immanently ecocentric".

Kovel therefore thinks that these universalizing tendencies must lead to the formation of "a consciously 'Ecosocialist Party'" that is neither like a parliamentary or vanguardist party. Instead, Kovel advocates a form of political party "grounded in communities of resistance", where delegates from these communities form the core of the party's activists, and these delegates and the "open and transparent" assembly they form are subject to recall and regular rotation of members. He holds up the Zapatista Army of National Liberation (EZLN) and the Gaviotas movement as examples of such communities, which "are produced outside capitalist circuits" and show that "there can be no single way valid for all peoples".

Nonetheless, he also firmly believes in connecting these movements, stating that "ecosocialism will be international or it will be nothing" and hoping that the Ecosocialist Party can retain the autonomy of local communities while supporting them materially. With an ever-expanding party, Kovel hopes that "defections" by capitalists will occur, leading eventually to the armed forces and police who, in joining the revolution, will signify that "the turning point is reached".

=== Two principles ===
The economist Pat Devine highlights the necessity to abolish the social division of labor as one of two principles necessary for building an eco-socialist future, the other being the abolition of the metabolic rift, as detailed by John Bellamy Foster.

== Revolution and transition to eco-socialism ==
The revolution as envisaged by eco-socialists involves an immediate socio-political transition. Internationally, eco-socialists believe in a reform of the nature of money and the formation of a World People's Trade Organisation (WPTO) that democratizes and improves world trade through the calculation of an Ecological Price (EP) for goods. This would then be followed by a transformation of socioeconomic conditions towards ecological production, commons land and notions of usufruct (that seek to improve the common property possessed by society) to end private property. Eco-socialists assert that this must be carried out with adherence to non-violence.

=== Immediate aftermath of the revolution ===
Eco-socialists like Kovel use the term "Eco-socialist revolution" to describe the transition to an eco-socialist world society. In the immediate socio-political transition, he believes that four groups will emerge from the revolution, namely revolutionaries, those "whose productive activity is directly compatible with ecological production" (such as nurses, schoolteachers, librarians, independent farmers and many other examples), those "whose pre-revolutionary practice was given over to capital" (including the bourgeoisie, advertising executives and more) and "the workers whose activity added surplus value to capitalist commodities".

In terms of political organisation, he advocates an "interim assembly" made up of the revolutionaries that can "devise incentives to make sure that vital functions are maintained" (such as short-term continuation of "differential remuneration" for labor), "handle the redistribution of social roles and assets", convene "in widespread locations", and send delegates to regional, state, national and international organisations, where every level has an "executive council" that is rotated and can be recalled. From there, he asserts that "productive communities" will "form the political as well as economic unit of society" and "organize others" to make a transition to eco-socialist production.

He adds that people will be allowed to be members of any community they choose with "associate membership" of others, such as a doctor having main membership of healthcare communities as a doctor and associate membership of child-rearing communities as a father. Each locality would, in Kovel's eyes, require one community that administered the areas of jurisdiction through an elected assembly. High-level assemblies would have additional "supervisory" roles over localities to monitor the development of ecosystemic integrity, and administer "society-wide services" like transport in "state-like functions", before the interim assembly can transfer responsibilities to "the level of the society as a whole through appropriate and democratically responsive committees".

=== Transnational trade and capital reform ===
In Kovel's eyes, part of the eco-socialist transition is the reforming money to retain its use in "enabling exchanges" while reducing its functions as "a commodity in its own right" and "repository of value". He argues for directing money to "enhancement of use-values" through a "subsidization of use-values" that "preserves the functioning core of the economy while gaining time and space for rebuilding it". Internationally, he believes in the immediate cessation of speculation in currencies ("breaking down the function of money as commodity, and redirecting funds on use-values"), the cancellation of the debt of the Global South ("breaking the back of the value function" of money) and the redirecting the "vast reservoir of mainly phony value" to reparations and "ecologically sound development". He suggests the end of military aid and other forms of support to "comprador elites in the South" will eventually "lead to their collapse".

In terms of trade, Kovel advocates a World People's Trade Organization (WPTO), "responsible to a confederation of popular bodies", in which "the degree of control over trade is ... proportional to involvement with production", meaning that "farmers would have a special say over food trade" and so on. He posits that the WPTO should have an elected council that will oversee a reform of prices in favour of an Ecological Price (EP) "determined by the difference between actual use-values and fully realized ones", thus having low tariffs for forms of ecological production like organic agriculture; he also envisages the high tariffs on non-ecological production providing subsidies to ecological production units.

The EP would also internalize the costs of current externalities (like pollution) and "would be set as a function of the distance traded", reducing the effects of long-distance transport like carbon emissions and increased packaging of goods. He thinks that this will provide a "standard of transformation" for non-ecological industries, like the automobile industry, thus spurring changes towards ecological production.

=== Ecological production ===
Eco-socialists pursue "ecological production" that, according to Kovel, goes beyond the socialist vision of the emancipation of labor to "the realization of use-values and the appropriation of intrinsic value". He envisions a form of production in which "the making of a thing becomes part of the thing made" so that, using a high quality meal as an analogy, "pleasure would obtain for the cooking of the meal" - thus activities "reserved as hobbies under capitalism" would "compose the fabric of everyday life" under eco-socialism.

This, for Kovel, is achieved if labor is "freely chosen and developed... with a fully realized use-value" achieved by a "negation" of exchange-value, and he exemplifies the Food Not Bombs project for adopting this. He believes that the notion of "mutual recognition ... for the process as well as the product" will avoid exploitation and hierarchy. With production allowing humanity to "live more directly and receptively embedded in nature", Kovel predicts that "a reorientation of human need" will occur that recognises ecological limits and sees technology as "fully participant in the life of eco-systems", thus removing it from profit-making exercises.

In the course on an Eco-socialist revolution, writers like Kovel and Baer advocate a "rapid conversion to ecosocialist production" for all enterprises, followed by "restoring ecosystemic integrity to the workplace" through steps like workers ownership. He then believes that the new enterprises can build "socially developed plans" of production for societal needs, such as efficient light-rail transport components. At the same time, Kovel argues for the transformation of essential but, under capitalism, non-productive labour, such as child care, into productive labour, "thereby giving reproductive labour a status equivalent to productive labour".

During such a transition, he believes that income should be guaranteed and that money will still be used under "new conditions of value... according to use and to the degree to which ecosystem integrity is developed and advanced by any particular production". Within this structure, Kovel asserts that markets and will become unnecessary – although "market phenomena" in personal exchanges and other small instances might be adopted – and communities and elected assemblies will democratically decide on the allocation of resources. Istvan Meszaros believes that such "genuinely planned and self-managed (as opposed to bureaucratically planned from above) productive activities" are essential if eco-socialism is to meet its "fundamental objectives".

Eco-socialists are quick to assert that their focus on "production" does not mean that there will be an increase in production and labor under Eco-socialism. Kovel thinks that the emancipation of labor and the realization of use-value will allow "the spheres of work and culture to be reintegrated". He cites the example of Paraguayan Indian communities (organised by Jesuits) in the eighteenth century who made sure that all community members learned musical instruments, and had labourers take musical instruments to the fields and take turns playing music or harvesting.

=== Commons, property and usufruct ===
Most eco-socialists, including Alier and Guha, echo subsistence eco-feminists like Vandana Shiva when they argue for the restoration of commons land over private property. They blame ecological degradation on the inclination to short-term, profit-inspired decisions inherent within a market system. For them, privatization of land strips people of their local communal resources in the name of creating markets for neo-liberal globalization, which benefits a minority. In their view, successful commons systems have been set up around the world throughout history to manage areas cooperatively, based on long-term needs and sustainability instead of short-term profit.

Many eco-socialists focus on a modified version of the notion of 'usufruct' to replace capitalist private property arrangements. As a legal term, usufruct refers to the legal right to use and derive profit or benefit from property that belongs to another person, as long as the property is not damaged. According to eco-socialists like Kovel, a modern interpretation of the idea is "where one uses, enjoys – and through that, improves – another's property", as its Latin etymology "condenses the two meanings of use – as in use-value, and enjoyment – and as in the gratification expressed in freely associated labour". The idea, according to Kovel, has roots in the Code of Hammurabi and was first mentioned in Roman law "where it applied to ambiguities between masters and slaves with respect to property"; it also features in Islamic Sharia law, Aztec law and the Napoleonic Code.

Crucially for eco-socialists, Marx mentioned the idea when he stated that human beings are no more than the planet's "usufructaries, and, like boni patres familias, they must hand it down to succeeding generations in an improved condition". Kovel and others have taken on this reading, asserting that, in an eco-socialist society, "everyone will have ... rights of use and ownership over those means of production necessary to express the creativity of human nature", namely "a place of one's own" to decorate to personal taste, some personal possessions, the body and its attendant sexual and reproductive rights.

However, Kovel sees property as "self-contradictory" because individuals emerge "in a tissue of social relations" and "nested circles", with the self at the centre and extended circles where "issues of sharing arise from early childhood on". He believes that "the full self is enhanced more by giving than by taking" and that eco-socialism is realized when material possessions weigh "lightly" upon the self – thus restoration of use-value allows things to be taken "concretely and sensuously" but "lightly, since things are enjoyed for themselves and not as buttresses for a shaky ego".

This, for Kovel, reverses what Marxists see as the commodity fetishism and atomization of individuals (through the "unappeasable craving" for "having and excluding others from having") under capitalism. Under eco-socialism, he therefore believes that enhancement of use-value will lead to differentiated ownership between the individual and the collective, where there are "distinct limits on the amount of property individuals control" and no-one can take control of resources that "would permit the alienation of means of production from another". He then hopes that the "hubris" of the notion of "ownership of the planet" will be replaced with usufruct.

=== Non-violence ===
Most eco-socialists are involved in peace and anti-war movements, and eco-socialist writers, like Kovel, generally believe that "violence is the rupturing of ecosystems" and is therefore "deeply contrary to ecosocialist values". Kovel believes that revolutionary movements must prepare for post-revolutionary violence from counter-revolutionary sources by "prior development of the democratic sphere" within the movement, because "to the degree that people are capable of self-government, so will they turn away from violence and retribution" for "a self-governed people cannot be pushed around by any alien government". In Kovel's view, it is essential that the revolution "takes place in" or spreads quickly to the United States, which "is capital's gendarme and will crush any serious threat", and that revolutionaries reject the death penalty and retribution against former opponents or counter-revolutionaries.

Although traditionally non-violent, there is growing scepticism of solely using non-violent tactics as a strategy in the eco-socialist agenda and as a way of dismantling harmful systems. Although progress has been made in the climate movement with non-violent tactics (as demonstrated by XR who pushed the UK government to declare a climate emergency), the movement is still failing to bring about radical decarbonisation. As eco-socialist activist, Andreas Malm states in his book How to Blow Up a Pipeline, "If non-violence is not to be treated as a holy covenant or rite, then one must adopt the explicitly anti-Gandhian position of Mandela: 'I called for non-violent protest for as long as it was effective', as 'a tactic that should be abandoned when it no longer worked." Malm argues there is another phase beyond peaceful protest.

== Criticism ==
While in many ways the criticisms of eco-socialism combine the traditional criticisms of both socialism and Green politics, there are unique critiques of eco-socialism, which are largely from within the traditional socialist or Green movements themselves, along with conservative criticism.

Some socialists are critical of the term "eco-socialism". David Reilly, who questions whether his argument is improved by the use of an "exotic word", argues instead that the "real socialism" is "also a green or 'eco'" one that you get to "by dint of struggle". Other socialists, like Paul Hampton of the Alliance for Workers' Liberty (a British third camp socialist party), see eco-socialism as "classless ecology", wherein eco-socialists have "given up on the working class" as the privileged agent of struggle by "borrowing bits from Marx but missing the locus of Marxist politics".

Writing in Capitalism Nature Socialism, Doug Boucher, Peter Caplan, David Schwartzman and Jane Zara criticise eco-socialists in general and Joel Kovel in particular for a deterministic "catastrophism" that overlooks "the countervailing tendencies of both popular struggles and the efforts of capitalist governments to rationalize the system" and the "accomplishments of the labor movement" that "demonstrate that despite the interests and desires of capitalists, progress toward social justice is possible". They argue that an ecological socialism must be "built on hope, not fear".

Some environmentalists and conservationists have criticised eco-socialism from within the Green movement. In a review of Joel Kovel's The Enemy of Nature, David M. Johns criticises eco-socialism for not offering "suggestions about near term conservation policy" and focusing exclusively on long-term societal transformation. Johns believes that species extinction "started much earlier" than capitalism and suggests that eco-socialism neglects the fact that an ecological society will need to transcend the destructiveness found in "all large-scale societies", the very tendency that Kovel himself attacks among capitalists and traditional leftists who attempt to reduce nature to "linear" human models. Johns questions whether non-hierarchical social systems can provide for billions of people, and criticises eco-socialists for neglecting issues of population pressure. Furthermore, Johns describes Kovel's argument that human hierarchy is founded on raiding to steal women as "archaic".

== List of eco-socialists ==
- Elmar Altvater
- Ian Angus
- Rudolph Bahro
- Adam Bandt
- Hugo Blanco
- Murray Bookchin
- Jabari Brisport
- Walt Brown
- Paul Burkett
- Max Chandler-Mather
- Barry Commoner
- Jeremy Corbyn
- Pat Devine
- Jutta Ditfurth
- Sabrina Fernandes
- John Bellamy Foster
- Alberto Garzón
- André Gorz
- Ramachandra Guha
- Donna Haraway
- Howie Hawkins
- Jason Hickel
- Joan Herrera i Torres
- Naomi Klein
- Joel Kovel
- Dimitri Lascaris
- Enrique Leff
- Michael Löwy
- Caroline Lucas
- Andreas Malm
- David McReynolds
- Jean-Luc Mélenchon
- Chico Mendes
- Luka Mesec
- George Monbiot
- William Morris
- Abdullah Öcalan
- James O'Connor
- David Orton
- Simon Pirani
- Zack Polanski
- Lee Rhiannon
- Raül Romeva
- Manuel Sacristán
- Ariel Salleh
- Joan Saura
- Pernille Skipper
- Jill Stein
- Chlöe Swarbrick
- Alan Thornett
- Peter Tatchell
- Alex Tyrrell
- Derek Wall
- Raymond Williams
- Gerrard Winstanley
- Avi Lewis
- Ross Greer
- Emily Lowan

== See also ==
- Critique of political economy
- Diggers movement
- Eco-communalism
- Eco-social market economy
- Ecological democracy
- Ecological economics
- Green libertarianism
- Green politics and parties
- Green socialism
- Green New Deal
- Marxist philosophy of nature
- Radical environmentalism
- Red socialism
- Social-ecology
- Veganarchism
- Yellow socialism
