= NG1 =

NG1 may refer to:

== Vehicles ==
- South African Class NG1 0-4-0T, a locomotive class
- Niedrauer NG-1, a sailplane

== Missions ==
- "So You’re Telling Me There’s a Chance" (NG-1), the Blue Origin New Glenn flight 1, on 16 January 2025
- Northrup-Grumman CRS-1 mission (CRS NG-1), the first Cygnus mission, then called Orbital Sciences Cygnus Orb-1 (CRS Orb-1)

== See also ==
- NG (disambiguation)
- NGL (disambiguation)
- NGI (disambiguation)
