= Joel Kovel =

American scholar and author (1936–2018)

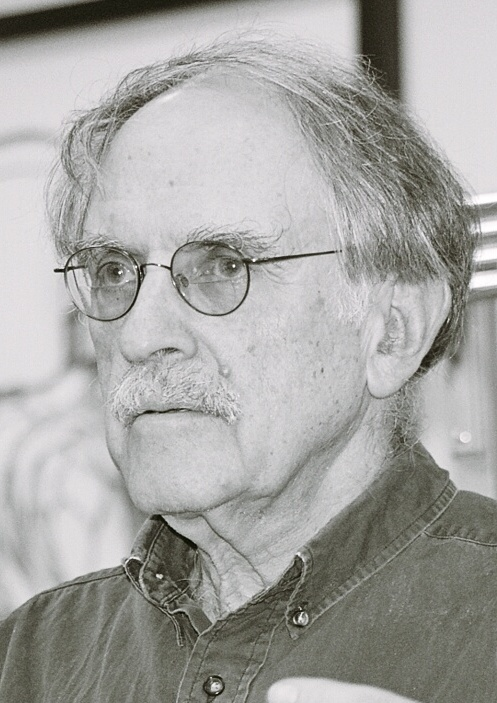
- Kovel in 2009
- Born: Joel Stephen Kovel; August 27, 1936; Brooklyn, New York City, New York, U.S.
- Died: April 30, 2018 (aged 81); New York City, New York, U.S.
- Occupations: Physician, scholar, human rights activist, writer
- Website: joelkovel.com (archived)

Joel Stephen Kovel (August 27, 1936 – April 30, 2018) was an American psychiatrist, scholar, human rights activist, and author known as a founder of eco-socialism. Kovel became a psychoanalyst, but he abandoned psychoanalysis in 1985.

== Background ==
Kovel was born on August 27, 1936, in Brooklyn, New York. His parents, immigrant Jews, were Louis Kovel (an accountant known for the "Kovel Rule") and Rose Farber. He attended Baldwin Senior High School (New York) in Baldwin, Nassau County, New York. In 1957, he received his B.S. summa cum laude from Yale University. In 1961, he received his M.D. from the Columbia University College of Physicians and Surgeons and in 1977 was a graduate of the Psychoanalytic Institute, Downstate Medical Center Institute, Brooklyn, New York.

== Career ==
=== Academic ===
From 1977 until 1983, he was Director of Residency Training, Department of Psychiatry, Albert Einstein College of Medicine, where he was also Professor of Psychiatry from 1979 to 1986. From 1980 to 1985, he was an adjunct professor of anthropology at the New School for Social Research, as well as a frequent contributor to Dialectical Anthropology, a journal founded by his colleague Stanley Diamond. Much of his work during this period focused on Marxism and Sigmund Freud.

In 1986, Kovel abandoned the field of psychiatry. From 1986 to 1987, he was a visiting professor of Political Science and Communications, University of California, San Diego. He also held short-term positions as a Visiting Lecturer at San Diego State University in the spring of 1990 and another visiting professor position at UCSD in Winter 1993.

In 1988, Kovel was appointed Alger Hiss Chair of Social Studies, a non-tenured position, at Bard College. In February 2009, he was informed that his position would not be renewed after the contract ended on June 20, 2009, and that he would be moved to emeritus status at that time. Kovel argued in a letter sent to the faculty of Bard College that his contract was not renewed due to his political views. He reiterated his argument in a statement posted on his official website that the "termination of service is prejudicial and motivated neither by intellectual nor pedagogic considerations, but by political values, principally stemming from differences between myself and the Bard administration on the issue of Zionism". The college president Leon Botstein responded in a letter sent directly to Kovel by arguing that his termination was not political but part of a larger move by Bard to reduce part-time faculty. Botstein stated: "To take what is self-evidently a result of economic constraint and turn it into a trumped-up case of prejudice and political victimization insults not only your intelligence but the intelligence of your readers." While Kovel called his dismissal illegitimate and vowed to fight the decision, he left Bard permanently per the university's decision in 2009.

=== Political ===
Kovel became involved in political activism in the 1960s as a result of the Vietnam War. He began to study Karl Marx which created a "conflict with his identity as a Freudian psychoanalyst", and led him to characterize himself as a "Marxist psychoanalyst", two categories which he described as "contrary" to each other. He would eventually abandon medicine, psychiatry, and psychoanalysis in 1985. He also worked in defense of the Sandinista Revolution in Nicaragua.

By the late 1980s, he became involved with the environmental movement. He then had a brief career with the Green Party of the United States, under which he ran for the U.S. Senate in 1998 and "sought the party's presidential nomination in Denver in 2000."

Kovel was an advisory editor of Socialist Resistance.

== Personal life and death ==
Kovel married Virginia Ryan, a nurse, with whom he had a daughter and a son before they divorced. He then married DeeDee Halleck, with whom he had a daughter.

Kovel died age 81 on April 30, 2018, in New York City from pneumonia and autoimmune encephalitis.

== Views ==
=== Eco-socialism ===
In 2001, Kovel and Michael Löwy, an anthropologist and member of the Trotskyist Fourth International, released An Ecosocialist Manifesto. which set out to define eco-socialism.

=== Critique of capitalist expansion and globalization ===
Kovel was anti-capitalist and anti-globalization, seeing globalization as a force driven by capitalism; in turn, the rapid economic growth encouraged by globalization causes acute ecological crises. He believed that capitalist firms have to continue to generate profit through a combination of continually intensifying exploitation and selling to new markets, meaning that capitalism must grow indefinitely to exist, which seems impossible on a planet of finite resources.

In the eco-socialist manifesto, Kovel and Löwy suggested that capitalist expansion causes both "crises of ecology" through "rampant industrialization" and "societal breakdown" that springs "from the form of imperialism known as globalization", and that capitalism's expansion "exposes ecosystems" to pollutants, habitat destruction, and resource depletion, "reducing the sensuous vitality of nature to the cold exchangeability required for the accumulation of capital", while submerging "the majority of the world's people to a mere reservoir of labor power", as it penetrates communities through "consumerism and depoliticization". Furthermore, Kovel saw the form of neoliberal globalization as "a return to the pure logic of capital" that "has effectively swept away measures which had inhibited capital's aggressivity, replacing them with naked exploitation of humanity and nature"; for Kovel, this "tearing down of boundaries", which was "a deliberate response to a serious accumulation crisis" in the 1970s, has become the definition of modern globalization.

As eco-socialists disagree with the elite theories of capitalism, which tend to label a specific class or social group as conspirators who construct a system that satisfies their greed and personal desires, Kovel suggested that the capitalist system itself is self-perpetuating, fuelled by extra-human or impersonal forces. He used the Bhopal Union-Carbide industrial disaster as an example. Many anti-corporation observers would blame the avarice of those at the top of many multi-national corporations. Conversely, Kovel traced systemic impulses. Union Carbide were experiencing a decrease in sales that led to falling profits which, due to stock market conditions, translated into a drop in share values. The depreciation of share value made many shareholders sell their stock, weakening the company, and leading to cost-cutting measures that eroded the safety procedures and mechanisms at the Bhopal site. Though this did not make Bhopal inevitable in Kovel's mind, it showed the effect market forces can have on increasing the likelihood of ecological and social problems.

=== Use and exchange value ===
Kovel followed Marx's theories about the contradiction between use values and exchange values. As he wrote in The Enemy of Nature, within a market economy goods are not produced to meet needs but are produced to be exchanged for money that we then use to acquire other goods. As we have to keep selling in order to keep buying, we must persuade others to buy our goods just to ensure our survival, which leads to the production of goods with no previous use that can be sold to sustain our ability to buy other goods. Kovel stressed that this contradiction has reached a destructive extent, where certain essential activities, such as caring for relatives full-time and basic subsistence, are unrewarded, while unnecessary economic activities earn certain individuals huge fortunes.

=== Role of the state and transnational organisations ===
Capitalist expansion was seen by Kovel as being "hand in glove" with "corrupt and subservient client states" that repress dissent against the system, governed by international organisations "under the overall supervision of the Western powers and the superpower United States", which subordinate peripheral nations economically and militarily. Kovel further said that capitalism itself spurs conflict and ultimately war. Kovel stated that the war on terror between Islamist extremists and the United States is caused by "oil imperialism", whereby the capitalist nations require control over sources of energy, especially oil, which are necessary to continue intensive industrial growth"; in the quest for control of such resources, Kovel argued that the capitalist nations, specifically the United States, have come into conflict with the predominantly Muslim nations where oil is often found.

Kovel believed that state or self-regulation of markets does not solve the crisis "because to do so requires setting limits upon accumulation", which is "unacceptable" for a growth-orientated system, and that terrorism and revolutionary impulses cannot be tackled properly "because to do so would mean abandoning the logic of empire". Eco-socialists feel that increasing repressive counter-terrorism increases alienation and causes further terrorism and believe that state counter-terrorist methods are, in Kovel and Löwy's words, "evolving into a new and malignant variation of fascism", echoing Rosa Luxemburg's "stark choice" between "socialism or barbarism", which was believed to be a prediction of the coming of fascism and further forms of destructive capitalism at the beginning of the 20th century. Luxemburg was in fact murdered by proto-fascist Freikorps in the revolutionary atmosphere of Germany in 1919.

=== Critique of other forms of green politics and socialism ===
Kovel criticized many within the green movement for not being overtly anti-capitalist, for working within the existing capitalist, statist system, for voluntarism, or for reliance on technological fixes. He suggested that eco-socialism differs from green politics at the most fundamental level because the four pillars of green politics and the "Ten Key Values" of the Green Party of the United States do not include the demand for the emancipation of labor and the end of the separation between producers and the means of production.

==== Opposition to within-system approaches, voluntarism, and technological fixes ====
Kovel was highly critical of those within the green movement who favour "working within the system"; while he recognized the ability of within-system approaches to raise awareness, and the belief that "the struggle for an ecologically rational world must include a struggle for the state", he believed that the mainstream green movement is too easily co-opted by the current powerful socio-political forces as it "passes from citizen-based activism to ponderous bureaucracies scuffling for 'a seat at the table'". For Kovel, capitalism is "happy to enlist" the Green movement for "convenience", "control over popular dissent", and "rationalization", and further attacked within-system green initiatives like carbon trading, which he saw as a "capitalist shell game" that turns pollution "into a fresh source of profit".

Kovel criticized the "defeatism" of voluntarism in some local forms of environmentalism that do not connect. He suggested that they can be "drawn off into individualism" or co-opted to the demands of capitalism, as in the case of certain recycling projects, where citizens are "induced to provide free labor" to waste management industries who are involved in the "capitalization of nature". He labelled the notion of voluntarism "ecopolitics without struggle".

Kovel wrote that "events in nature are reciprocal and multi-determined" and can not be predictably "fixed"; socially, technologies cannot solve social problems because they are not "mechanical". He posits an analysis, developed from Marx, that patterns of production and social organisation are more important than the forms of technology used within a given configuration of society. Under capitalism, he suggested that technology "has been the sine qua non of growth", believing that even in a world with hypothetical "free energy" the effect would be to lower the cost of automobile production, leading to the massive overproduction of vehicles, "collapsing infrastructure", chronic resource depletion, and the "paving over" of the "remainder of nature".

In the modern world, Kovel considered the supposed efficiency of new post-industrial commodities is a "plain illusion", as miniaturized components involve many substances and are non-recyclable, and theoretically only simple substances could be retrieved by burning out-of-date equipment, releasing more pollutants. He warned "environmental liberals" against over-selling the virtues of renewable energies that cannot meet the mass energy consumption of the era; although he would still support renewable energy projects, he believed it is more important to restructure societies to reduce energy use before relying on renewable energy technologies alone.

==== Critique of green economics ====
Kovel thought that eco-socialists must reject at a fundamental level what he called "ecological economics" or the "ecological wing of mainstream economics" for being "uninterested in social transformation". He further rejected the neo-Smithian school, who believe in Adam Smith's vision of "a capitalism of small producers, freely exchanging with each other", which is self-regulating and competitive. The school is represented by thinkers like David Korten who believe in "regulated markets" checked by government and civil society; for Kovel, they do not provide a critique of the expansive nature of capitalism away from localized production and ignore "questions of class, gender, race or any other category of domination".

Kovel also criticized their "fairy-tale" view of history, which refers to the abuse of "natural capital" by the materialism of the Scientific Revolution, an assumption that, in Kovel's eyes, seems to suggest that "nature had toiled to put the gift of capital into human hands" rather than capitalism being a product of social relations in human history.

Other forms of community-based economics were also rejected by Kovel, including followers of E. F. Schumacher and some members of the cooperative movement, for advocating "no more than a very halting and isolated first step". He thought that their principles are "only partially realizable within the institutions of cooperatives in capitalist society" because "the internal cooperation" of cooperatives is "forever hemmed in and compromised" by the need to expand value and compete within the market.

For Kovel, community-based economics and green localism are "a fantasy" because "strict localism belongs to the aboriginal stages of society" and would be an "ecological nightmare at present population levels" due to "heat losses from a multitude of dispersed sites, the squandering of scarce resources, the needless reproduction of effort, and cultural impoverishment". While he felt that small-scale production units are "an essential part of the path towards an ecological society", he saw them not as "an end in itself"; in his view, small enterprises can be either capitalist or socialist in their configuration and therefore must be "consistently anti-capitalist" through recognition and support of the emancipation of labor, and exist "in a dialectic with the whole of things", as human society will need large-scale projects, such as transport infrastructures.

Kovel highlighted the work of leading ecological economist and steady-state theorist Herman Daly, who exemplifies what eco-socialists see as the good and bad points of ecological economics, while he offered a critique of capitalism and a desire for "workers ownership", saying that he only believes in workers ownership "kept firmly within a capitalist market", ignoring the eco-socialist desire for struggle in the emancipation of labor and hoping that the interests of labor and management today can be improved so that they are "in harmony".

==== Critique of deep ecology ====
Kovel has attacked deep ecology because, like other forms of green politics and green economics, it features "virtuous souls" who have "no internal connection with the critique of capitalism and the emancipation of labor". He was particularly critical about deep ecology and its "fatuous pronouncement" that Green politics is "neither left nor right, but ahead", which, for him, ignores the notion that "that which does not confront the system becomes its instrument".

Kovel suggested that in "its effort to decentre humanity within nature", deep ecologists can "go too far" and argue for the "splitting away of unwanted people", as evidenced by their desire to preserve wilderness by removing the groups that have lived there "from time immemorial". Kovel thought that this lends legitimacy to "capitalist elites" like the United States Department of State and the World Bank, who can make preservation of wilderness a part of their projects that "have added value as sites for ecotourism" but remove people from their land. Between 1986 and 1996, Kovel commented that over three million people were displaced by "conservation projects"; in the making of the United States national parks, three hundred Shoshone Indians were killed in the development of Yosemite. Kovel believed that deep ecology has affected the rest of the Green movement and led to calls from restrictions on immigration, "often allying with reactionaries in a ... cryptically racist quest". He found traces of deep ecology in the "biological reduction" of Nazism, an ideology many "organicist thinkers" have found appealing, including Herbert Gruhl, a founder of the Alliance 90/The Greens (who subsequently left when it became more left wing) and originator of the phrase "neither left nor right, but ahead". Kovel warned that while ecofascism is confined to a narrow band of far-right intellectuals and disaffected white power skinheads who involved themselves alongside far-left groups in the anti-globalization movement, it may be "imposed as a revolution from above to install an authoritarian regime in order to preserve the main workings of the system" in times of crisis.

==== Critique of bioregionalism ====
Bioregionalism, a philosophy developed by writers like Kirkpatrick Sale who believe in the self-sufficiency of "appropriate bioregional boundaries" drawn up by inhabitants of "an area", has been critiqued by Kovel, who feared that the "vagueness" of the area will lead to conflict and further boundaries between communities. While Sale cites the bioregional living of Native Americans, Kovel commented that such ideas are impossible to translate to populations of modern proportions, and evidences the fact that Native Americans held land in commons, rather than private property; for eco-socialists, bioregionalism provides no understanding of what is needed to transform society, and what the inevitable "response of the capitalist state" would be to people constructing bioregionalism.

Kovel also attacked the problems of self-sufficiency. Where Sale believes in self-sufficient regions "each developing the energy of its peculiar ecology", such as "wood in the northwest [US]", Kovel asked "how on earth" these can be made sufficient for regional needs, and commented the environmental damage of converting Seattle into a "forest-destroying and smoke-spewing wood-burning" city. Kovel also questioned Sale's insistence on bioregions that do "not require connections with the outside, but within strict limits", and whether this precludes journeys to visit family members and other forms of travel.

==== Critique of variants of eco-feminism ====
Kovel acknowledged the importance of "the gendered bifurcation of nature" and supported the emancipation of gender as it "is at the root of patriarchy and class". Nevertheless, while he believed that "any path out of capitalism must also be eco-feminist", he criticized types of ecofeminism that are not anti-capitalist and can "essentialize women's closeness to nature and build from there, submerging history into nature", becoming more at place in the "comforts of the New Age Growth Centre". For Kovel, these limitations "keep ecofeminism from becoming a coherent social movement".

==== Critique of social ecology ====
Though Kovel recognized social ecology as part of a similar radical tradition as eco-socialism, he still distinguished one from the other because social Ecologists see hierarchy "in-itself" as the cause of ecological destruction, whereas eco-socialists focus on gender, class, and race domination embodied in capitalism and recognise that forms of authority that are not "an expropriation of human power for ... self-aggrandizement", such as a student-teacher relationship that is "reciprocal and mutual", are beneficial.

In practice, Kovel described social ecology as continuing the anarchist tradition of non-violent direct action, which is "necessary" but "not sufficient" because "it leaves unspoken the question of building an ecological society beyond capital". Furthermore, social ecologists and anarchists tend to focus on the state alone, rather than the class relations behind state domination in the view of Marxists. Kovel feared that this is political, springing from historic hostility to Marxism among anarchists and sectarianism, which he pointed out as a fault of Murray Bookchin, the "brilliant" but "dogmatic" founder of social ecology.

==== Critique of actually-existing socialisms ====
For Kovel and Löwy, eco-socialism is "the realization of the 'first-epoch' socialisms" by resurrecting the notion of "free development of all producers", distancing themselves from "the attenuated, reformist aims of social democracy and the productivist structures of the bureaucratic variations of socialism", such as forms of Leninism and Stalinism. They grounded the failure of past socialist movements in "underdevelopment in the context of hostility by existing capitalist powers", which led to "the denial of internal democracy" and "emulation of capitalist productivism". Kovel believed that the forms of "actually existing socialism" consisted of "public ownership of the means of production", rather than meeting "the true definition" of socialism as "a free association of producers", with the party–state bureaucracy acting as the "alienating substitute 'public'".

In analysing the Russian Revolution, Kovel felt that "conspiratorial" revolutionary movements "cut off from the development of society" will "find society an inert mass requiring leadership from above". From this, he commented that the anti-democratic Tsarist heritage meant that the Bolsheviks, who were aided into power by World War One, were a minority who, when faced with a counter-revolution and invading Western powers, continued "the extraordinary needs of 'war communism'", which "put the seal of authoritarianism" on the revolution; for Kovel, Vladimir Lenin and Leon Trotsky "resorted to terror", shut down the soviets (workers' councils), and emulated "capitalist efficiency and productivism as a means of survival", setting the stage for Stalinism. In Kovel's eyes, Lenin came to oppose the nascent Bolshevik environmentalism and its champion Aleksandr Bogdanov, who was later attacked for "idealism"; Kovel described Lenin's philosophy as "a sharply dualistic materialism, rather similar to the Cartesian separation of matter and consciousness, and perfectly tooled ... to the active working over of the dead, dull matter by the human hand", which led him to want to overcome Russian backwardness through rapid industrialization. According to Rovel, this tendency was augmented by a desire to catch-up with the West and the "severe crisis" of the revolution's first years. Furthermore, Kovel quoted Trotsky, who believed in a communist "superman" who would "learn how to move rivers and mountains". Kovel believes that, in Joseph Stalin's "revolution from above" and mass terror in response to the early 1930s economic crisis, Trotsky's writings "were given official imprimatur", despite the fact that Trotsky himself was eventually purged, as Stalinism attacked "the very notion of ecology ... in addition to ecologies". Kovel added that Stalin "would win the gold medal for enmity to nature", and that, in the face of massive environmental degradation, the inflexible Soviet bureaucracy became increasingly inefficient and unable to emulate capitalist accumulation, leading to a "vicious cycle" that led to its collapse.

=== Strategies ===
Kovel advocated the non-violent dismantling of capitalism and the state, focusing on collective ownership of the means of production by freely associated producers and restoration of the Commons.

==== Agency ====
Kovel focused on working-class involvement in the formation of eco-socialist parties or their increased involvement in existing Green Parties; however, he believed that, unlike many other forms of socialist analysis, "there is no privileged agent" or revolutionary class, and that there is potential for agency in numerous autonomous, grassroots individuals and groups who can build "prefigurative" projects for non-violent radical social change. He defined "prefiguration" as "the potential for the given to contain the lineaments of what is to be", meaning that "a moment toward the future exists embedded in every point of the social organism where a need arises". If "everything has prefigurative potential", Kovel commented that forms of potential ecological production will be "scattered", and suggested that "the task is to free them and connect them". While all "human ecosystems" have "ecosocialist potential", Kovel said that ones such as the World Bank have low potential, whereas internally democratic anti-globalization "affinity groups" have a high potential through a dialectic that involves the "active bringing and holding together of negations", such as the group acting as an alternative institution ("production of an ecological/socialist alternative") and trying to shut down a G8 summit meeting ("resistance to capital"), and "practices that in the same motion enhance use-values and diminish exchange-values are the ideal" for eco-socialists.

==== Prefiguration ====
For Kovel, the main prefigurative steps "are that people ruthlessly criticize the capitalist system ... and that they include in this a consistent attack on the widespread belief that there can be no alternative to it", which will then "deligitimate the system and release people into struggle". Kovel justified this by stating that "radical criticism of the given ... can be a material force", even without an alternative, "because it can seize the mind of the masses of people", leading to "dynamic" and "exponential", rather than "incremental" and "linear", victories that spread rapidly. He advocated the expansion of the dialectical eco-socialist potential of groups through sustaining the confrontation and internal cohesion of human ecosystems, leading to an "activation" of potentials in others that will "spread across the whole social field" as "a new set of orienting principles" that define an ideology or "'party-life' formation".

In the short-term, Kovel advocated activities that have the "promise of breaking down the commodity form". This includes organizing labor, which is a "reconfiguring of the use-value of labor power"; forming cooperatives, allowing "a relatively free association of labor"; forming localized currencies, which he saw as "undercutting the value-basis of money"; and supporting "radical media" that, in his eyes, involve an "undoing of the fetishism of commodities". He advocated economic localisation in the same vein as many in the green movement, although only as a prefigurative step rather than an end in itself. He also advised political parties attempting to "democratize the state" that there should be "dialogue but no compromise" with established political parties, and that there must be "a continual association of electoral work with movement work" to avoid "being sucked back into the system". He believed that such parties should focus on "the local rungs of the political system" first, before running national campaigns that "challenge the existing system by the elementary means of exposing its broken promises".

Kovel believed in building prefigurations around forms of production based on use values, which will provide a practical vision of a post-capitalist, post-statist system. Such projects include Indymedia ("a democratic rendering of the use-values of new technologies such as the Internet, and a continual involvement in wider struggle"), open-source software, Wikipedia, public libraries, and many other initiatives, especially those developed within the anti-globalisation movement.

==== Internationalization of prefiguration and the eco-socialist party ====
The Jewish-born Kovel "experiencd in his later years what he called a Christian spiritual conversion" and was baptized.

Kovel believed that examples like the Christian Bruderhof Communities (despite elements of patriarchy that he attacks) show that "communistic" organizations can "survive rather well in a heavily industrialized market" if they are "protected" from the dependence on the market by "anti-capitalist intentionality". He further posited that class struggle is "internationalized in the face of globalization", as evidenced by a wave of strikes across the Global South in the first half of the year 2000; he wrote that "labor's most cherished values are already immanently ecocentric", and thought that these universalizing tendencies must lead to the formation of "a consciously 'Ecosocialist Party'" that is neither like a parliamentary or vanguardist party. Kovel advocated a form of political party "grounded in communities of resistance", where delegates from these communities form the core of the party's activists, and these delegates and the "open and transparent" assembly they form are subject to recall and regular rotation of members. He held up the Zapatista Army of National Liberation (EZLN) and the Gaviotas movement as examples of such communities, which "are produced outside capitalist circuits" and show that "there can be no single way valid for all peoples". Nonetheless, he also believed in connecting these movements, stating that "ecosocialism will be international or it will be nothing" and hoping that the Ecosocialist Party can retain the autonomy of local communities while supporting them materially. With an ever-expanding party, Kovel hoped that "defections" by capitalists will occur, leading eventually to the armed forces and police who, in joining the revolution, will signify that "the turning point is reached".

=== Eco-socialist revolution ===
Kovel used the term "eco-socialist revolution" to describe the transition to an eco-socialist world society. In the immediate socio-political transition, he believed that four groups will emerge from the revolution: revolutionaries, those "whose productive activity is directly compatible with ecological production" (such as nurses, schoolteachers, librarians, independent farmers and many other examples), those "whose pre-revolutionary practice was given over to capital" (including the bourgeoisie, advertising executives and more) and "the workers whose activity added surplus value to capitalist commodities". In terms of political organisation, he advocated an "interim assembly" made up of the revolutionaries that can "devise incentives to make sure that vital functions are maintained" (such as short-term continuation of "differential remuneration" for labor), "handle the redistribution of social roles and assets", convene "in widespread locations", and send delegates to regional, state, national and international organisations, where every level has an "executive council" that is rotated and can be recalled. From there, he wrote that "productive communities" will "form the political as well as economic unit of society" and "organize others" to make a transition to eco-socialist production; he added that people will be allowed to be members of any community they choose with "associate membership" of others, such as a doctor having main membership of healthcare communities as a doctor and associate membership of child-rearing communities as a father. In Kovel's eyes, each locality would require one community that administered the areas of jurisdiction through an elected assembly. High-level assemblies would have additional "supervisory" roles over localities to monitor the development of ecosystemic integrity, and administer "society-wide services" like transport in "state-like functions", before the interim assembly can transfer responsibilities to "the level of the society as a whole through appropriate and democratically responsive committees".

==== Transnational trade and capital reform ====
For Kovel, part of the eco-socialist transition is the reforming money to retain its use in "enabling exchanges", while reducing its functions as "a commodity in its own right" and "repository of value". He argued for directing money to "enhancement of use-values" through a "subsidization of use-values" that "preserves the functioning core of the economy while gaining time and space for rebuilding it". Internationally, he believed in the immediate cessation of speculation in currencies ("breaking down the function of money as commodity, and redirecting funds on use-values"), the cancellation of the debt of the Global South ("breaking the back of the value function" of money), and the redirecting the "vast reservoir of mainly phony value" to reparations and "ecologically sound development". He suggested the end of military aid and other forms of support to "comprador elites in the South" will eventually "lead to their collapse".

In terms of trade, Kovel advocated a World People's Trade Organization (WPTO), "responsible to a confederation of popular bodies", in which "the degree of control over trade is ... proportional to involvement with production", meaning that "farmers would have a special say over food trade" and so on. He posited that the WPTO should have an elected council that will oversee a reform of prices in favour of an ecological price (EP) "determined by the difference between actual use-values and fully realized ones", having low tariffs for forms of ecological production like organic agriculture; he also envisaged the high tariffs on non-ecological production providing subsidies to ecological production units. The EP would also internalize the costs of current externalities like pollution and "would be set as a function of the distance traded", reducing the effects of long-distance transport like carbon emissions and increased packaging of goods. He thought that this will provide a "standard of transformation" for non-ecological industries, like the automobile industry, spurring changes towards ecological production.

==== Ecological production ====
Kovel pursued "ecological production" that goes beyond the socialist vision of the emancipation of labor to "the realization of use-values and the appropriation of intrinsic value". He envisioned a form of production in which "the making of a thing becomes part of the thing made" so that, using a high quality meal as an analogy, "pleasure would obtain for the cooking of the meal"; activities "reserved as hobbies under capitalism" would "compose the fabric of everyday life" under eco-socialism. For Kovel, this is achieved if labor is "freely chosen and developed ... with a fully realized use-value" achieved by a "negation" of exchange-value, and he exemplified the Food Not Bombs project for adopting this. He believed that the notion of "mutual recognition ... for the process as well as the product" will avoid exploitation and hierarchy. With production allowing humanity to "live more directly and receptively embedded in nature", Kovel predicted that "a reorientation of human need" will occur that recognises ecological limits and sees technology as "fully participant in the life of eco-systems", removing it from profit-making exercises.

In the course on an eco-socialist revolution, Kovel advocated the "rapid conversion to ecosocialist production" for all enterprises, followed by "restoring ecosystemic integrity to the workplace" through steps like workers ownership. He believed that the new enterprises can build "socially developed plans" of production for societal needs, such as efficient light-rail transport components. At the same time, Kovel argued for the transformation of essential but under capitalism non-productive labor, such as child care, into productive labor, "thereby giving reproductive labour a status equivalent to productive labour". During such a transition, he believed that income should be guaranteed and that money will still be used under "new conditions of value ... according to use and to the degree to which ecosystem integrity is developed and advanced by any particular production". Within this structure, Kovel said that markets will become unnecessary, although "market phenomena" in personal exchanges and other small instances might be adopted, and communities and elected assemblies will democratically decide on the allocation of resources.

Kovel stated that the focus on "production" does not mean that there will be an increase in production and labor under eco-socialism. He thought that the emancipation of labor and the realization of use-value will allow "the spheres of work and culture to be reintegrated". He cited the example of Paraguayan Indian communities organized by Jesuits in the 18th century who made sure that all community members learned musical instruments, and had laborers take musical instruments to the fields and takes turns playing music or harvesting.

==== Commons, property, and usufruct ====
Kovel focused on a modified version of the notion of usufruct to replace capitalist private property arrangements. As a legal term, usufruct refers to the legal right to use and derive profit or benefit from property that belongs to another person, as long as the property is not damaged. According to Kovel, a modern interpretation of the idea is "where one uses, enjoys – and through that, improves – another's property", as its Latin etymology "condenses the two meanings of use – as in use-value, and enjoyment – and as in the gratification expressed in freely associated labour". According to Kovel, the idea has roots in the Code of Hammurabi and was first mentioned in Roman law "where it applied to ambiguities between masters and slaves with respect to property"; it also features in Islamic Sharia law, Aztec law and the Napoleonic Code.

Kovel highlighted the fact that Marx mentioned the idea when he stated that human beings are no more than the planet's "usufructaries, and, like boni patres familias, they must hand it down to succeeding generations in an improved condition". Kovel took on this reading, saying that in an eco-socialist society "everyone will have ... rights of use and ownership over those means of production necessary to express the creativity of human nature", namely "a place of one's own" to decorate to personal taste, some personal possessions, the body and its attendant sexual and reproductive rights; however, Kovel saw property as "self-contradictory" because individuals emerge "in a tissue of social relations" and "nested circles", with the self at the centre and extended circles where "issues of sharing arise from early childhood on". He believed that "the full self is enhanced more by giving than by taking" and that eco-socialism is realized when material possessions weigh "lightly" upon the self, and restoration of use-value allows things to be taken "concretely and sensuously" but "lightly, since things are enjoyed for themselves and not as buttresses for a shaky ego". For Kovel, this reversed what Marxists see as the commodity fetishism and atomization of individuals through the "unappeasable craving" for "having and excluding others from having" under capitalism. Under eco-socialism, he believed that enhancement of use-value will lead to differentiated ownership between the individual and the collective, where there are "distinct limits on the amount of property individuals control" and no-one can take control of resources that "would permit the alienation of means of production from another". He hoped that the "hubris" of the notion of "ownership of the planet" will be replaced with usufruct.

==== Non-violence ====
Kovel wrote that "violence is the rupturing of ecosystems" and is therefore "deeply contrary to ecosocialist values". He believed that revolutionary movements must prepare for post-revolutionary violence from counter-revolutionary sources by "prior development of the democratic sphere" within the movement because "to the degree that people are capable of self-government, so will they turn away from violence and retribution" for "a self-governed people cannot be pushed around by any alien government". In Kovel's view, it is essential that the revolution "takes place in" or spreads quickly to the United States, which "is capital's gendarme and will crush any serious threat", and that revolutionaries reject the death penalty and retribution against former opponents or counter-revolutionaries.

== Criticism ==
Writing in Capitalism Nature Socialism, Doug Boucher, Peter Caplan, David Schwartzman, and Jane Zara criticised eco-socialists in general, and Kovel in particular, for a deterministic "catastrophism" that overlooks "the countervailing tendencies of both popular struggles and the efforts of capitalist governments to rationalize the system" and the "accomplishments of the labor movement" that "demonstrate that despite the interests and desires of capitalists, progress toward social justice is possible". They argued that an ecological socialism must be "built on hope, not fear".

== Overcoming Zionism controversy ==
In June 2008, the University of Michigan Press severed ties with the British independent publishing firm Pluto Press, for which it served as the American distributor. The decision came after a series of events tied to the distribution of Kovel's 2007 book Overcoming Zionism, which argued that "the creation of Israel was a mistake and urges adoption of the "one state" solution to the Israeli-Palestinian conflict in which Israelis and Palestinians would form a new country, without a Jewish character." In a 2007 interview on Democracy Now!, Kovel said:

I feel that the notion of Zionism, as that there is this kind of destiny of the Jewish people to have their own state, is just a wrong idea. And it's an idea that requires signing on to imperialism. It means signing on to ethnic cleansing. It means—despite everything that has been said about it, it means basically becoming a racist situation, where you're oppressing an indigenous population and depriving them of their right to existence, and then thinking that somehow you can go ahead and have a decent life on that basis. And you can't, in my view. And I join hands with those people who feel that the time has come to basically think of Israel in the same category as South Africa, as a state that just has gone wrong and needs replacement.

According to University Spokeswoman Kelly Cunningham, the University of Michigan Press stopped distributing the book in the fall of 2007 after "serious questions" were raised about the book by "members of the university community." Later in September, the University of Michigan Press announced that it would resume distribution of Overcoming Zionism after receiving complaints that it was conducting censorship. The executive board of the University of Michigan Press said in a statement that though it "has deep reservations about Overcoming Zionism, it would be a blow against free speech to remove the book from distribution on that basis. We conclude that we should not fail to honor our distribution agreement based on our reservations about the content of a single book. Such a course raises both First Amendment issues and concerns about the appearance of censorship. As members of the university community dedicated to academic freedom and open debate among differing views, the Executive Board stands firmly for freedom of expression, and against even the appearance of censorship. In this instance, both legal and value considerations lead us to the decision to resume distribution of the book." At the same time, the University of Michigan Press also stated that "had the manuscript gone through the standard review process used by the University of Michigan Press, the board would not have recommended publication. But the arrangement with Pluto Press is for distribution only; the UM Press never intended to review individually every title published by Pluto (or any other press for which it holds distribution rights). By resuming distribution, the board in no way endorses the content of the book."

== Selected publications ==
Kovel's book White Racism (1970) received a nomination for the National Book Award. His works include A Complete Guide to Therapy (1979), The Age of Desire (1982), Against the State of Nuclear Terror (1982), In Nicaragua (1986), The Radical Spirit: Essays on Psychoanalysis and Society (1988), History and Spirit (1991), Red Hunting in the Promised Land (1994), The Enemy of Nature (2002), and Overcoming Zionism (2007). He was the editor-in-chief of Capitalism, Nature, Socialism. His last work, published in 2017, was a memoir entitled The Lost Traveller's Dream.

- Overcoming Zionism: Creating a Single Democratic State in Israel/Palestine (Pluto Press, February 2007), ISBN 0-7453-2569-6.
- The Enemy of Nature: The End of Capitalism or the End of the World? 1st edition, (London: Zed Books, 2002), ISBN 1-84277-081-0, 2nd edition, (London: Zed Books, 2007), ISBN 1-84277-871-4;
- Red Hunting in the Promised Land (New York: Basic Books, 1994), ISBN 0-465-00364-8.
- History and Spirit (Boston: Beacon Press, 1991), ISBN 0-8070-2916-5.
- The Radical Spirit: Essays on Psychoanalysis and Society (London: Free Association Books, 1989), ISBN 0-946960-57-7.
- In Nicaragua (New York: Columbia University Press, 1989), ISBN 0-946960-90-9.
- White Racism: A Psychohistory (New York: Columbia University Press, 1984), ISBN 0-231-05797-0.
- Against the State of Nuclear Terror (Boston: South End Press, 1984), ISBN 0-89608-220-2.
- The Age of Desire: Case Histories of a Radical Psychoanalyst (New York: Pantheon, 1981), ISBN 0-394-50818-1.
- A Complete Guide to Therapy (New York: Pantheon, 1976), ISBN 0-394-48992-6.
- "Therapy in Late Capitalism". Telos 30 (Winter 1976–1977). (New York: Telos Press).
