= NGL =

NGL may refer to:

== Companies and organizations ==
- National Guardian Life, an American life insurance company
- North German Lloyd, a German shipping company
- No Greater Love, U.S. humanitarian non-profit organization
- NGL Prime SpA, a European launcher development company
- National Gridiron League (Australia), a proposed American football league in Australia that never played
- National Gridiron League (United States), a proposed American football league in the United States that never played
- Nordic Golf League, a professional golf tour
- NGL (app), a messaging service.

== Other uses ==
- Nordic green left (disambiguation)
- Internet slang term for "not gonna lie"
- Next-generation lithography, a term describing lithography technologies
- Neues Geistliches Lied, a German genre of new songs for use in churches
- Natural gas liquids, hydrocarbons in natural gas processing
- Next Generation Launcher, a rocket designed by Orbital ATK and renamed to OmegA in 2018
