= Green Left =

Green left refers primarily to a political affiliation that combines elements of green politics and left-wing politics, or eco-socialism, in countries where the term is used, while the Nordic green left is a specific brand of socialism from the Nordic countries that incorporates elements of environmentalism and feminism.

Green Left or Left Green may also refer to:

== International groupings ==
- Nordic Green Left Alliance
- "European United Left–Nordic Green Left", former name of The Left in the European Parliament

== Federations of parties ==
- Federation of The Greens–Green Left, Spain
- Greens and Left Alliance, Italy

== Political parties ==
- GreenLeft, Netherlands
- Green–Left Coalition, Croatia
- Green–Left Front, Serbia
- Green Left (Catalonia)
- Green Left (Denmark), also known as Socialist People's Party
- Green Left (Hungary)
- Green Left Party, Turkey
- Left-Green Movement, Iceland

== Newspapers ==
- Green Left, Australia
