= Los Verdes =

Los Verdes (Spanish: "the greens") may refer to:

- Confederation of the Greens
- Los Verdes de la Comunidad de Madrid
- Los Verdes-Izquierda Verde

== See also ==
- Las verdes praderas
