= Next Generation Internet Program =

The Next Generation Internet Program (also NGI, NGI Initiative) was a United States Government project intended to drastically increase the speed of the Internet. President Bill Clinton and Vice President Al Gore announced their commitment to the program on October 10, 1996.

The last Internet Archive mirror of the site stated:

The Next Generation Internet (NGI) Program has been successfully completed and the Federal agencies are currently coordinating advanced networking research programs under the Large Scale Networking (LSN) Coordinating Group. Please see the LSN Website at http://www.nitrd.gov/nitrdgroups/index.php?title=Large_Scale_Networking_Coordinating_Group_(LSN_CG).
The NGI Program met all of its goals except for its goal of Terabit per second networking in FY2002 that is expected to be met by the current LSN research activities.

The Large Scale Networking Coordinating Group was part of the Networking and Information Technology Research and Development program.

== See also ==
- Internet2
- IPv6
- Next Generation Internet (disambiguation)
