= Enrique Leff =

Mexican economist and sociologist

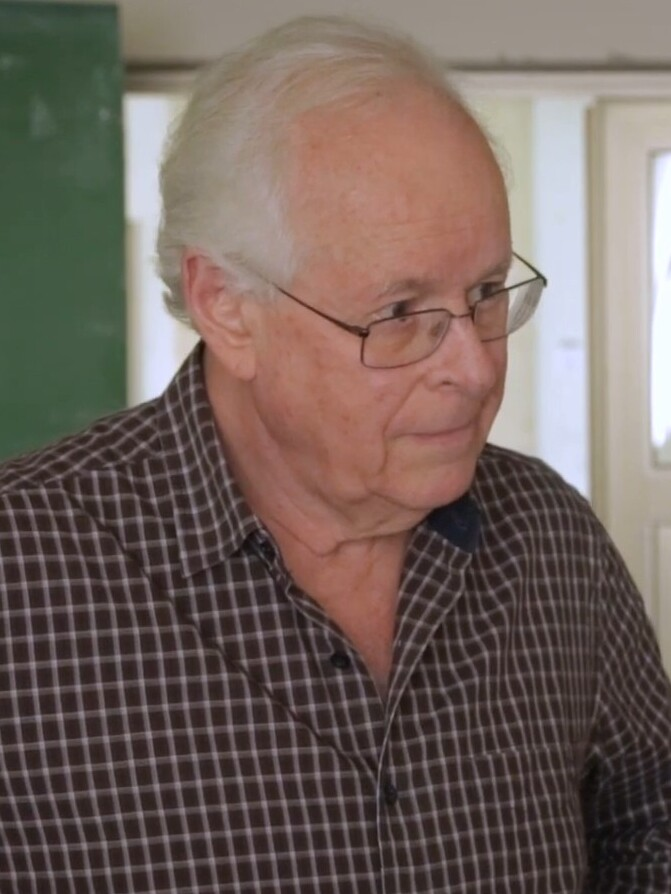
- Leff in 2019
- Born: 1946 (age 78–79); Mexico City, Mexico

Philosophical work
- Era: 20th–21st-century philosophy
- Region: Western philosophy
- School: Continental Philosophy, Philosophy of ecology
- Main interests: epistemology, political ecology, environmental sustainability, ecology
- Notable ideas: Environmental knowledge

Enrique Leff (born 1946) is a Mexican economist, environmental sociologist and environmentalist. He has written 25 books and 180 articles on political ecology, environmental sociology, environmental economics, environmental epistemology and environmental education. He is regarded as one of the key environmental thinkers in Latin America.

== Background ==
After a degree in chemical engineering from UNAM (Universidad Nacional Autónoma de México) in 1968. Leff graduated with a Doctorat de Troisième Cycle in development economics from the École Pratique des Hautes Études, Paris, in 1975.

Leff lectured at UNAM (Universidad Nacional Autónoma de México) full-time from 1973-1986 before becoming coordinator of the Environmental Training Network for Latin America and the Caribbean (1986-2008) and coordinator of the Mexico City office of the Regional Office of Latin America and the Caribbean of the United Nations Environment Programme (2007-2008).

In 2008 he returned full-time as professor of political ecology and environmental politics at UNAM. He is also senior researcher at the Institute of Social Research (Instituto de Investigaciones Sociales) at the same university.

Leff works in Spanish, Portuguese, English and French. In addition to academic work he is an accomplished opera, Lieder and bolero singer. He has a Masters in Voice from the Manhattan School of Music (1983).

== Scholarly contributions ==
Leff works in the academic fields of epistemology, environmental economics, environmental sociology, political ecology, and environmental education.

He is best known for arguing that environmental problems result from a crisis of Western civilization's ways of knowing, understanding and transforming the world (Eschenhagen 2012). This masks other legitimate ways of thinking and acting in the world, namely forms of 'eco-development' and environmental rationality. His work is largely theoretical but his major books cite positive examples of the ethnobotanic practices of Prehispanic cultures in Latin America, sustainable agricultural practices in tropical ecosystems, etc.

== Recognition ==
- Mexican Academy of Sciences

== Key publications ==
- Leff E. 2012. Latin American environmental thinking: a heritage of knowledge for sustainability. Environmental Ethics 34:4.
- Leff E. 2010. Imaginarios Sociales y Sustentabilidad, Cultura y Representaciones Sociales Editora, No. 9.
- Leff E. 2009. Ecologia, Capital e Cultura: a Territorialização da Racionalidade Ambiental, Petrópolis, Brasil: Vozes Editora.
- Leff E. 2006. Aventuras de la epistemología ambiental. De la articulación de las ciencias al diálogo de saberes. México: Siglo XXI Editores.
- Leff E. 2004. Racionalidad ambiental. La apropiación social de la naturaleza. México: Siglo XXI Editores.
- Leff E. (coord.) 2002. Ética, vida, sustentabilidad . Serie Pensamiento Ambiental Latinoamericano No. 5. México: PNUMA.
- Leff, E. Escurra, E., Pisanty, I. and Romero Lankao, P. (Eds.) 2002. La transición hacia el desarrollo sustentable. Perspectivas de América Latina y el Caribe. México: SEMARNAT-INE-UAM-PNUMA (second edition).
- Leff, E. & M. Bastida 2001. Comercio, medio ambiente y desarrollo sustentable: Perspectivas de América Latina y el Caribe. Mexico: UNEP/ETU.
- Leff E. 2001. Epistemologia ambiental. São Paulo: Cortez Editora.
- Leff, E. (ed.). 2001. Justicia ambiental: Construcción y defensa de los nuevos derechos ambientales culturales y colectivos en América Latina. Mexico: UNEP.
- Leff, E. (ed.) 2000/2003. La complejidad ambiental. México: Siglo XXI.
- Leff, E. 2000. The scientific-technological revolution, the forces of nature, and Marx’s theory of value. Capitalism, Nature, Socialism 11(4): 109-129.
- Leff, E. 1999. On the social appropriation of nature. Capitalism, Nature, Socialism 10(3): 89-104.
- Leff, E. 1998. Murray Bookchin and the end of dialectical naturalism. Capitalism, Nature, Socialism 9(4):67-93.
- Leff, E. 1998/2002. Saber ambiental. Racionalidad, sustentabilidad, complejidad, poder. México: Siglo XXI Editores.
- Leff, E. 1995. Green production. Towards an environmental rationality. New York: Guilford Publications.
- Leff, E. 1994. Ciencias sociales y formación ambiental. Barcelona: GEDISA.
- Leff, E. 1994. Ecología y capital. Racionalidad ambiental, democracia participativa y desarrollo sustentable. Mexico: Siglo XXI.
- Leff, E. 1993. Marxism and the environmental question: from critical theory of production to an environmental rationality for sustainable development. Capitalism, Nature, Socialism 4(1):44-66.
- Leff, E. & J. Carabias (eds.) 1993. Cultura y Manejo Sustentable de los Recursos Naturales. 2 volumes. México: CIICH-UNAM/Miguel Ángel Porrúa.
- Leff, E. 1990. Medio ambiente y desarrollo en México. Mexico: CIIH-UNAM/Miguel Ángel Porrúa.. México: CIIH-UNAM/Miguel Ángel Porrúa.
- Leff, E. 1986. Ecotechnological productivity: a conceptual basis for the integrated management of natural resources. Social science information 25(3): 681-702.
- Leff, E. 1986. Ecología y Capital: Hacia una Perspectiva Ambiental del Desarrollo. México: UNAM.
- Leff, E. (Ed.). 1986. Los problemas del conocimiento y la perspectiva ambiental del desarrollo. México: Siglo XXI Editores.
- Leff, E. (Ed.). 1981. Biosociologia y Articulacion de las Ciencias. Mexico: UNAM.
- Leff, E. (Ed.). 1980. Teoría del Valor. México: UNAM.
