= NGI =

NGI may refer to:

- NGI Airport or Gau Airport, an airport in Fiji
- National Geographic Institute (Belgium), the Belgian national mapping agency
- Navigazione Generale Italiana, an Italian shipping company
- NewcastleGateshead Initiative, British agency
- Next Generation Identification, a project of the US Federal Bureau of Investigation (FBI)
- Next generation interceptor (NGI)
- Next Generation Internet (disambiguation)
- Northern Gulf Institute, a US National Oceanic and Atmospheric Administration (NOAA) Cooperative Institute
- Norwegian Geotechnical Institute, a private geoscience research and consulting foundation
- National Genetics Institute, genetics laboratory co-founded by Andrew Conrad
- Nehemiah Global Initiative, a non-governmental organization founded by Kenneth Bae
- National Grid Initiatives (see European Grid Infrastructure)

== See also ==
- Ngi language, a language of Cameroon
- Ngi, a god of the Yaoundé people of Cameroon
