= Nordic green left =

Nordic socialist political ideology

Nordic green left refers to a specific brand of socialism from the Nordic countries that incorporates elements of environmentalism and feminism. Nordic green left parties are organized in:

- a subgroup of the European United Left–Nordic Green Left-group in the European parliament
- an alliance of political parties called Nordic Green Left Alliance

== See also ==
- NGL (disambiguation)
- Green Left (disambiguation)
- Popular socialism
