= Paul Burkett =

American economist (1956–2024)

- Born: May 26, 1956; Wyandotte, Michigan, U.S.
- Died: January 7, 2024 (aged 67); Terre Haute, Indiana, U.S.
- Occupations: Economist, educator
- Website: papapatty.org

Paul Burkett (May 26, 1956 – January 7, 2024) was an American economist, educator, and musician known for his writings on ecological Marxism. He published numerous works on eco-socialism, including collaborations with scholars John Bellamy Foster and Martin Hart-Landsberg. Burkett taught at Syracuse University, Auburn Correctional Facility, the University of Miami, and Indiana State University. Burkett also performed jazz saxophone under the moniker PapaPatty, named in honor of his late son Patrick.

Burkett and his twin brother Patrick were born in Wyandotte, Michigan, to parents William Loyd Burkett and Dorothy Whalen Burkett. After attending Wyandotte Roosevelt High School and Kalamazoo College, Burkett went on to earn his Doctor of Philosophy in Economics from Syracuse University in 1984.

Burkett died from complications of acute myeloid leukemia at his home in Terre Haute, Indiana, on January 7, 2024, at the age of 67.

== Career ==
Burkett spent many years teaching at the university level, retiring from Indiana State University in 2020. His articles appeared in Monthly Review, Climate & Capitalism, and International Socialism.

=== Works ===
- Marx and Nature: A Red and Green Perspective (1999)
- Development, Crisis and Class Struggle: Learning from Japan and East Asia (2000) with Martin Hart-Landsberg
- China and Socialism: Market Reforms and Class Struggle (2005) with Martin Hart-Landsberg
- Marxism and Ecological Economics: Toward a Red and Green Political Economy (2006)
- Marx and the Earth: An Anti-Critique (2016) with John Bellamy Foster
