= NGL Prime =

NGL Prime SpA is a technology company created for the purpose of all activities related to future European launchers which are not related to Ariane 5 or Vega or their evolutions.

== History ==
The company registration has taken place on the 10 March 2006. The company was awarded in June 2007 ESA's FLPP program and its associated IXV demonstrator programme. NGL Prime SpA team includes specialists from France, Germany and Italy. A great share of the work will also be subcontracted to specialised industries in many European countries.

== Corporate affairs ==
NGL Prime is a joint venture of Arianegroup (70%) and Leonardo (30%). The corresponding shareholder agreement was signed on 31 January 2006. The registered seat of the company is Turin (Italy). The legal corporate form of the company is the one of an Italian Società per Azioni (SpA), with indefinite duration.

The CEO of NGL Prime were Axel Roenneke (2006-2008) and Jens Lassmann (2008-2009).
