= Next Generation Internet =

Next Generation Internet may refer to:

- China Next Generation Internet (CNGI), a five-year plan initiated by the Chinese government
- Future Internet, a general term for research projects on how the Internet might evolve
- Next Generation Internet (NGI), part of European Commission’s Horizon Europe program
- Next Generation Internet Program (NGI), a United States Government project

== See also ==
- ICANN, Internet Corporation for Assigned Names and Numbers
- Internet Assigned Numbers Authority (IANA)
- Next generation network, similar concept for telecommunications networks
