= Revolution from above =

Imposed by the élite

A revolution from above refers to major political and social changes that are imposed by an élite on the population it dominates. It usually occurs in urban areas in a capital city. By contrast, the plain term "revolution" suggests that pressure from below is a major driving force in events, even if other social groups cooperate with—or ultimately capture—the movement. The phrase "revolution from above" was coined by the Spanish writer Joaquín Costa (1846-1911) in the 19th century. In contrast, a "revolution from below" refers to a grassroots campaign against élites. Johann Gottlieb Fichte advocated the right of revolution, particularly from above rather than below.

== Examples ==
=== East Asia ===
- Meiji Restoration
- Wuxu Reform

=== Middle East ===
- Tanzimat
- Kemalism in Turkey
- White Revolution in Iran

=== Europe ===
- Enlightened absolutism in 18th-century Europe
- The Constitution of the German Confederation (1871) and the formation of the German Empire
- Stalin's Collectivization of agriculture
- De-Stalinization under Nikita Khrushchev
- Great Purge in the Soviet Union under Stalin
- German reunification

== See also ==
- Revolution from Above: Military Bureaucrats and Development in Japan, Turkey, Egypt, and Peru, a 1978 book written by Ellen Kay Trimberger
- Passive revolution – a similar concept associated with Antonio Gramsci
