= Revolution from Above =

Book by Ellen Kay Trimberger

Revolution from Above: Military Bureaucrats and Development in Japan, Turkey, Egypt, and Peru
- Author: Ellen Kay Trimberger
- Language: English
- Publisher: Transaction Books
- Publication date: 1978

Revolution from Above: Military Bureaucrats and Development in Japan, Turkey, Egypt, and Peru is a sociological book written by Ellen Kay Trimberger, published in 1978 by Transaction Books. Trimberger outlines several criteria for what she calls "revolution from above" and attempts to explicate this social phenomenon's emergence developed through a comparative historical analysis. Most of the book is dedicated to explaining the Meiji Restoration in Japan and the Turkish War of Independence. The theory is then extended to include the Egyptian Revolution of 1952 and Peru's 1968 coup led by Velasco. Trimberger's contribution is significant with regard to sociological theories of the state significant insofar as it departs from the Marxist conception of the state as merely a political superstructure built on an economic base.

== Synopsis ==
=== Definition of Revolution from Above ===
Trimberger outlines five characteristics which make a case a "revolution from above" (p. 3):

1. The extralegal takeover of political power and the initiation of economic, social, and political change is organized and led by some of the highest military and often civil bureaucrats in the old regime.
2. There is little or no mass participation in the revolutionary takeover or in the initiation of change. Mass movements and uprisings may precede and accompany revolution from above, but military bureaucrats who take revolutionary action do so independently from, and often in opposition to, such movements.
3. The extralegal takeover of power and initiation of change is accompanied by very little violence, execution, emigration, or counter-revolution.
4. The initiation of change is undertaken in a pragmatic, step-at-a-time manner with little appeal to radical ideology. Both the third and fourth characteristics are the result of control and use of a bureaucratic apparatus for radical aims.
5. Military bureaucrats who lead a revolution from above—as opposed to a coup d'état—destroy the economic and political base of the aristocracy or upper class. This destructive process is basic to both revolution from above and from below.

=== Notion of the state ===
Trimberger departs from the Marxian theories of the state as simply the political "superstructure" on top of the economic "base", or the more substantive theory of "relatively autonomy" as described by Nicos Poulantzas.

Instead, Trimberger has a theory of the state in which the state is more autonomous, with its actors acting without regard to dominant class interests. Trimberger sees the state as "relatively autonomous" when military and civil bureaucrats are not recruited from dominant classes and when they do not form social and economic ties with these classes after their ascension to high office. These state bureaucrats become "dynamically autonomous" during periods of crisis, in which they take measures to destroy the existing economic and class order. They act independently of the existing class structures.

=== Criteria for emergence ===
Furthermore, she outlines five criteria for the emergence of a revolution from above. The criteria are later revised to include only four after incorporating the Egyptian and Peruvian cases.

The five criteria are the following (p. 41-43):

1. Military bureaucrats have the potential for leading a revolution from above when the officer class—or a significant segment of it—is independent of those classes which control the means of production. Military bureaucrats are autonomous in this sense when they are not recruited from the dominant landed, commercial, or industrial classes, and when they do not form close personal and economic ties with these classes after their election to high office.
2. As bureaucrats, military officers are trained to be specialized professionals working in a hierarchy and isolated from general political concerns. Autonomous military bureaucrats become revolutionaries only if they develop political cohesion.
3. Autonomous military bureaucrats united around a nationalist ideology will act in a revolutionary manner only in response to movements within the country demanding an end to national degradation by foreign powers.
4. Autonomous military bureaucrats can stage a successful revolution from above only when contradictions in the international constellation of power can be exploited to increase national autonomy.
5. Dissident military bureaucrats must have a provincial base of power separate from the central government to stage a revolution from above.

Trimberger removes the final criterion in applying the theory to the Egyptian and Peruvian cases, given that these conflicts did not need a provincial base to succeed.

== Criticism ==
Trimberger's book was favorably received by revolutions scholars, who had focused so much on the "Great Revolutions" of France, Russia, and China, but had largely neglected the so-called "revolutions from above".

However, like Theda Skocpol's States and Social Revolutions, scholars have raised objections regarding the status of values, meaning, and cultural to the explanation of revolution. Another objection regards the selection and inclusion of cases: phenomena that fit under the rubric of "revolution from above" may fit more intuitively under another, more strictly delineated category.
