= National Guardian Life =

American life insurance company since 1909

NGL Insurance Company
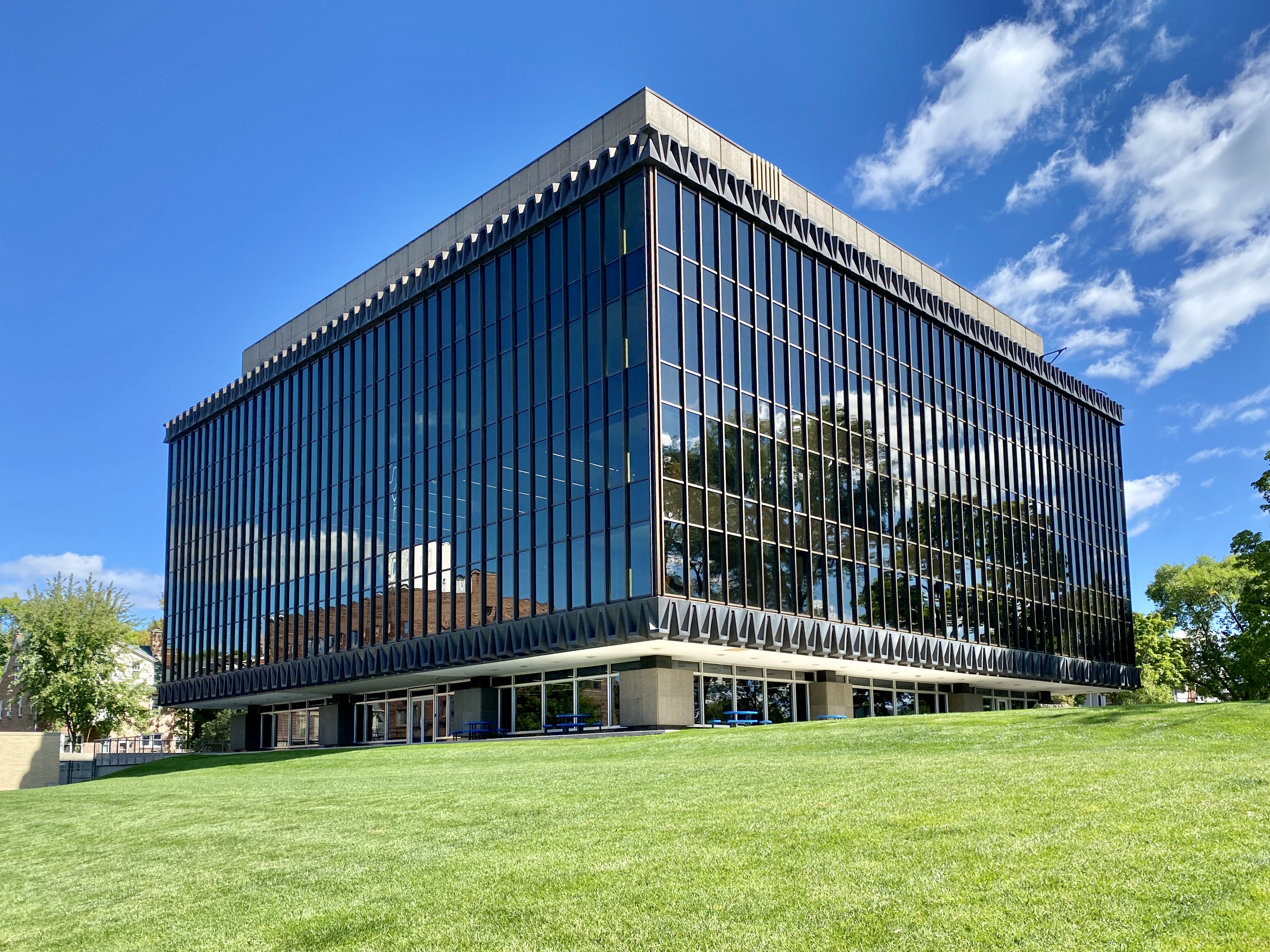
- NGL Insurance Company headquarters in Madison, Wisconsin
- Type: Mutual life insurance company
- Industry: Insurance
- Founded: 1909
- Headquarters: Madison, Wisconsin, United States
- Key people: Joe Celentano (President/CEO)
- Products: Preneed, Long Term Care, Vision, Dental, Hospital Indemnity
- Revenue: $998 million USD (2025)
- Website: http://www.nglic.com

NGL Insurance Company (NGL), formerly National Guardian Life Insurance Company, is an American insurance company located in Madison, Wisconsin. It was formed in 1909 and is an independent mutual life insurance holding company and is licensed to do business in 49 states and the District of Columbia.

NGL has an A (Excellent) rating from A.M. Best. NGL provides preneed (funeral/burial) insurance, long-term care insurance and group employee benefits such as vision, dental, and hospital indemnity coverage.

== History ==
NGL Insurance Company (NGL) was founded in 1909 under the name The Wisconsin State Life Insurance Company as a stock company in Madison, Wisconsin. In August 1910 the company changed their name to Guardian Life Insurance Company and a month later the first life insurance policy - policy #1 with a face amount of $5,000 - was sold.

In January 1920, the word "National" was added to the company's name in response to Germania Life Insurance Company becoming "The Guardian Life Insurance Company of America" in 1918.

In 1936, NGL became a mutual company based on a decision by the board of directors and several years later, in 1948, the company reached their first $100 million of insurance force. In mid-1995, NGL entered into an alliance with Indianapolis Life Insurance Company in order to market individual term life insurance products and organized "NGL Securities Services LLC" as a subsidiary of NGL Financial Services, Inc.

In late 1998, NGL organized Kentucky Home Life Insurance Company as a subsidiary for sales in the Commonwealth of Kentucky. Later that year, NGL merged with Kentucky Home Mutual Life Insurance Company and acquired 19,000 policies and its subsidiaries: Kentucky Home Capital Corporation, Kentucky Home Trust Company, and Southeastern Financial Services, Inc.

In early 1999, NGL purchased Allnation Life Insurance Company from Blue Cross/Blue Shield of Delaware and acquired approximately 3,900 policies. Later that year, NGL also acquired a small block of traditional life policies from United Wisconsin Life, and affiliate of Blue Cross/Blue Shield of Wisconsin. At the end of 1999, NGL purchased Settlers Life Insurance Company of Bristol, Virginia adding more than 350,000 policies and certificates.

Both Allnation and Kentucky Home Capital Corporation merged with NGL in early 2000, bringing NGL's ordinary insurance in force to exceed $4 billion. However, that year NGL also exited the Securities market and sold NGL Securities Services LLC to World Securities, Inc.

In the year of 2001, NGL went on to purchase Milwaukee Life Insurance Company from Clarica Life Insurance Company - U.S. and eventually merged with the company by late 2001. NGL also organized Pre-need Reinsurance Company of America (Pre-need Re) as a subsidiary for reinsurance of pre-need insurance written by select independent marketing organizations. NGL also exited the Trust and Investment Management market, ceasing operations of NGL Investment Management Services, Inc., and Kentucky Home Trust Company. The end of the year, NGl terminated their alliance with Indianapolis Life Insurance Company and discontinued selling National Guardian Life TermGuard policies.

In 2002, NGL entered into a joint venture with Starmount Life Insurance Company to market its Group Dental and Group Vision products. NGL also acquired 35,900 life insurance policies with about $115 million of policy reserves from Trustmark Insurance Company and begin to administer 5,100 annuity contracts. In 2003, Protected Home Mutual Life Insurance Company (Sharon, PA) merged with and into NGL, bringing 65,000 policies and $210 million of assets. In 2004, NGL set a record of $120 million of sales of life products, as measured by premium.

In 2005, NGL withdrew from the Traditional Life market and discontinued selling Universal Life Insurance, Traditional Whole Life Insurance and most annuity products. NGL also sold interest in Kentucky Home Life Insurance Company this year.

In 2006, Settlers Life Insurance Company (Bristol, VA) merged with and into NGL. The combined entity immediately changed its name to Settlers Life Insurance Company and focused sales on primarily final expense insurance. Two years later, in 2008, NGL purchased Key life Insurance Company (Indianapolis, IN), acquiring 8,700 policies. Key Life Insurance Company later merged into Settlers Life Insurance Company under NGL.

Late in that year, NGL acquired 80,000 life insurance policies with $47 million of policy reserves from Central American Life Insurance Company (West Monroe, LA), 20,000 policies with $10 million of reserves from Ashley Life Insurance Company (Hamburg, AR), and 8,100 paid up whole life policies from Western Catholic Union (Quincy, IL), with nearly $20 million of policy reserves.

In mid-2009, NGL acquired 5,700 policies with $20 million of policy reserves from Citizens Security Life Insurance Company. In 2010, NGL entered into a coinsurance transaction with Citizens Security Life Insurance Company (Louisville, KY). Along with $87 million in reserves, this acquisition includes 80,000 policies. In mid-2012, NGL entered into an affiliation with Commercial Travelers Mutual Insurance Company (Utica, NY), permitting NGL access to sell in the state of New York. In mid-2015, Standard Security Life Insurance Company of New York were reinsured into NGL. NGL made another acquisition in 2015: the July acquisition of Madison National Life Insurance Company gained 280,000 policies for NGL, with a value estimated at $260 million of reserves.

As of 2024, NGL held $5.1 billion in total assets and $4.7 billion in liabilities. NGL Insurance Group's A.M. Best Rating was upgraded to an A rating in 2021.

In June 2025, NGL filed a plan with the Wisconsin Office of the Commissioner of Insurance to form a mutual holding company. According to their website,

Restructuring as a mutual holding company enhances NGL’s ability to grow, innovate and serve customers better, while preserving the core values that come with being a mutual insurance company. Policyholders will maintain ownership and control of the insurance holding company while providing NGL greater financial flexibility.

As part of the conversion to a mutual holding company, the Wisconsin Office of the Commissioner of Insurance also approved the organization's name change to NGL Insurance Company (NGL), effective January 1, 2026.
