= Simon Pirani =

British writer, historian and researcher of energy

- Born: 2 March 1957 (age 69); Woolwich, London, United Kingdom
- Citizenship: British
- Occupations: Writer, researcher
- Parent: Felix Pirani
- Website: https://simonpirani.blogspot.com/p/global-history-of-fossil-fuel.html

Simon Pirani is a British writer, historian and researcher of energy. He is honorary professor in the School of Modern Languages and Cultures at the University of Durham. From 2007 to 2021 he was senior research fellow at the Oxford Institute for Energy Studies (with a period as senior visiting research fellow in 2017-19).

In 2018 Pirani published Burning Up: A Global History of Fossil Fuel Consumption, in which he portrays consumption growth as a result of world capitalist economic expansion. He argues that the relationship between technological systems that account for most fossil fuel use, and the social and economic systems in which they are embedded, is paramount. His articles and presentations on this theme are collected on his website. He also writes about these themes on a blog, People & Nature.

Pirani's earlier research as a historian centred on Russia, most notably in The Russian Revolution in Retreat 1920–1924: Soviet workers and the new communist elite (2008), a work of social history that details the increasingly fractious relationship between organised labour and the Communist party in Moscow in the early Soviet period, and Change in Putin's Russia: Power Money and People (2010).

Pirani has also written widely on natural gas markets in the former Soviet Union, including as co-editor of, and contributor to, The Russian Gas Matrix: How Markets Are Driving Change (2014). Prior to entering academia, Pirani worked as a journalist. He authored a series of reports on the Georgiy Gongadze case in Ukraine.

Pirani writes that his outlook was "formed in the Marxist tradition". He was a member of the Workers Revolutionary Party (UK) (a Trotskyist group) from 1972 until the early 1990s, and was the editor of the British mineworkers’ union journal (1990–95).

Simon Pirani is one of four children of Felix Pirani, a noted theoretical physicist.
