= NGL (app) =

Anonymous messaging application

- Developers: Mode Mobile (2025–present); NGL Labs (2021–2025)
- Release: November 2021; 5 years ago
- Operating system: iOS, Android
- Type: Anonymous social media
- License: Proprietary software
- Website: ngl.link

NGL (an initialism for "Not Gonna Lie") is an anonymous messaging application. It allows users to receive anonymous questions and messages from their social media followers. The app was launched in November 2021 by NGL Labs in Venice Beach, California. NGL became well known for its integration with Instagram and Snapchat.

In July 2024, the Federal Trade Commission (FTC) banned NGL from offering its services to users under the age of 18 following a lawsuit regarding safety and deceptive practices. In December 2025, the app was acquired by the smartphone rewards company Mode Mobile.

== History ==
NGL was founded by Raj Vir and João Figueiredo and released in November 2021. The name comes from the internet slang "not gonna lie". The app gained significant popularity in mid-2022. By June 2022, it became the most downloaded app on the Apple App Store in the United States.

By 2025, the app saw growth in international markets, including India, Brazil, and Saudi Arabia. This growth was partly driven by users sharing NGL links on WhatsApp. In December 2025, Mode Mobile acquired NGL. Following the acquisition, the original founders left the company, and the remaining employees joined Mode Mobile.

== Features ==
The app operates by generating a unique link for the user. Users post this link to their Instagram Stories, bio, or other social media feeds to request messages. People who click the link can send a message without revealing their identity. The receiver can view these messages in the NGL app inbox and share them as a reply on Instagram.

NGL operates on a freemium model. While the basic service is free, the app offers a paid subscription called "NGL Pro". This subscription claims to offer "hints" about the identity of the message sender, such as their general location or the type of phone they used.

== Safety and controversies ==
=== Cyberbullying concerns ===
Like other anonymous messaging apps such as Yik Yak and Ask.fm, NGL has been criticized for facilitating cyberbullying. While the app claimed to use artificial intelligence to filter harmful language, tests conducted by news organizations found that bullying terms often passed through the filters. NBC News reported that phrases like "everyone hates you" were not blocked by the system.

=== Fake messages ===
Users and investigators reported that the app sent fake messages to users to increase engagement. These messages appeared to be from real people but were actually automated bots. The Federal Trade Commission stated that the company created more than 1,000 generated messages, such as "I've had a crush on you for years," to trick users into thinking real people were messaging them. This was done to encourage users to pay for a subscription to see who sent the message.

=== FTC investigation and ban ===
In July 2024, the Federal Trade Commission (FTC) and the Los Angeles District Attorney reached a settlement with NGL Labs and its founders. The complaint alleged that NGL marketed its app to children despite knowing the risks of cyberbullying. It also alleged that the app deceived consumers with its "Pro" subscription by promising to reveal sender identities but only providing vague hints.

Internal communications revealed by the FTC showed employees calling their users "suckers" for paying for the service. As part of the settlement, NGL agreed to pay $5 million. The FTC also banned NGL from offering its app to any user under the age of 18. This was the first time the FTC barred an app from serving minors entirely. The company agreed to implement an age-gate to block young users.
