= James O'Connor (academic) =

American economist and sociologist

James Richard O'Connor (April 20, 1930 – November 12, 2017) was an American political economist and professor of sociology. He was born April 20, 1930, in Boston, Massachusetts, and died November 12, 2017, in Santa Cruz, California. Together with Barbara Laurence he founded the journal Capitalism Nature Socialism in 1988.

He had two sons, Steven and Daniel O'Connor.

== Works ==
- The Fiscal Crisis of the State (St. Martin's Press, 1973). ISBN 978-1-31513-204-4
- Accumulation Crisis (Basil Blackwell, Ltd, 1984). ISBN 0-631-13552-9
- The Meaning of Crisis (Basil Blackwell, Ltd, 1987). ISBN 0-631-13821-8
- Natural Causes: Essays in Ecological Marxism (Guilford Press, 1998). ISBN 978-1-57230-273-0
