= Federation of The Greens–Green Left =

Electoral coalition

The Federación de Los Verdes–Izquierda Verde (Spanish for "Federation of The Greens–Green Left") was a political federation founded in Spain in 1999 by Confederation of The Greens, the Initiative for Catalonia Greens, and Aragonese Council for the 1999 European Parliament election.
