= Capitalism Nature Socialism =

- Discipline: Political science
- Language: English
- Edited by: Salvatore Engel-Di Mauro

Publication details
- History: 1988–present –
- Publisher: Routledge on behalf of the Center for Political Ecology
- Frequency: Quarterly
- Open access: Delayed

Standard abbreviations
- ISO 4: Capital. Nat. Social.

Indexing
- ISSN: 1045-5752 (print); 1548-3290 (web)
- OCLC no.: 19480060

Links
- Journal homepage; Routledge; Online archive

Capitalism Nature Socialism is a quarterly peer-reviewed academic journal that was established by James O'Connor and Barbara Laurence in 1988. It is published by Routledge on behalf of the Center for Political Ecology and covers work on political ecology, with an ecosocialist perspective. The editor-in-chief is Salvatore Engel-Di Mauro.
