= Chancellor polling and projections for the 2025 German federal election =

In the run-up to the 2025 German federal election, which took place as a snap election on 23 February 2025, various organisations carried out opinion polling to gauge voting intentions in Germany. Results of such polls are displayed below.

== Chancellor polling ==
=== Chancellor candidates and lead candidates ===
These following polls gauge voters' opinions on the parties' Chancellor candidates: Olaf Scholz for the Social Democratic Party, Friedrich Merz for CDU/CSU (Union), Robert Habeck for Alliance 90/The Greens, Alice Weidel for the Alternative for Germany and Sahra Wagenknecht for the Sahra Wagenknecht Alliance as well as the lead candidate of the Free Democratic Party, Christian Lindner. Before their nominations they were also compared with each other as possible candidates in previous polls.

==== Scholz vs. Merz vs. Habeck vs. Weidel ====
| Polling firm | Fieldwork date | Sample size | Scholz SPD | Merz Union | Habeck Grüne | Weidel AfD | None |
|---|---|---|---|---|---|---|---|
| Forschungsgruppe Wahlen | 23 Feb 2025 | – | 19 | 34 | 17 | 19 | 11 |
| INSA | 20–21 Feb 2025 | 2,005 | 15 | 25 | 16 | 22 | 22 |
| Forschungsgruppe Wahlen | 19–20 Feb 2025 | 1,349 | 18 | 32 | 21 | 14 | 15 |
| Forsa | 17–20 Feb 2025 | 2,002 | 16 | 26 | 21 | 15 | 22 |
| Forsa | 11–17 Feb 2025 | 2,501 | 17 | 25 | 23 | 14 | 21 |
| INSA | 13–14 Feb 2025 | 1,005 | 15 | 24 | 15 | 21 | 25 |
| Forschungsgruppe Wahlen | 11–13 Feb 2025 | 1,348 | 17 | 33 | 24 | 14 | 12 |
| Forsa | 4–10 Feb 2025 | 2,502 | 17 | 24 | 23 | 15 | 21 |
| INSA | 6–7 Feb 2025 | 1,003 | 16 | 24 | 14 | 20 | 26 |
| Forschungsgruppe Wahlen | 4–6 Feb 2025 | 1,341 | 18 | 32 | 24 | 13 | 13 |
| INSA | 31 Jan – 3 Feb 2025 | 2,004 | 16 | 21 | 14 | 21 | 28 |
| Forsa | 28 Jan – 3 Feb 2025 | 2,503 | 16 | 22 | 22 | 16 | 24 |
| Forschungsgruppe Wahlen | 27–29 Jan 2025 | 1,428 | 20 | 30 | 24 | 13 | 13 |
| Forsa | 21–27 Jan 2025 | 2,504 | 16 | 25 | 22 | 16 | 21 |
| Forschungsgruppe Wahlen | 21–23 Jan 2025 | 1,345 | 16 | 31 | 25 | 15 | 13 |
| Forsa | 14–20 Jan 2025 | 2,502 | 16 | 23 | 23 | 16 | 22 |
| INSA | 16–17 Jan 2025 | 1,004 | 16 | 23 | 15 | 22 | 24 |
| Forsa | 7–13 Jan 2025 | 2,502 | 17 | 23 | 23 | 16 | 21 |
| INSA | 9–10 Jan 2025 | 1,002 | 14 | 21 | 14 | 21 | 30 |
| Forschungsgruppe Wahlen | 7–9 Jan 2025 | 1,433 | 14 | 27 | 27 | 15 | 17 |
| INSA | 23–27 Dec 2024 | 1,002 | 16 | 20 | 14 | 21 | 29 |
| INSA | 18–19 Dec 2024 | 1,005 | 15 | 20 | 14 | 24 | 27 |
| Forschungsgruppe Wahlen | 17–19 Dec 2024 | 1,362 | 16 | 29 | 25 | 16 | 14 |
| INSA | 12–13 Dec 2024 | 1,001 | 16 | 21 | 13 | 21 | 29 |
| Forsa | 3–9 Dec 2024 | 2,501 | 17 | 25 | 20 | 16 | 22 |
| INSA | 5–6 Dec 2024 | 1,002 | 15 | 21 | 14 | 18 | 32 |
| INSA | 8–11 Nov 2024 | 3,009 | 13 | 20 | 13 | 17 | 37 |
| INSA | 11–14 Oct 2024 | 2,002 | 23 | 23 | 12 | 19 | 23 |
| Forsa | 20–26 Jun 2023 | 2,506 | 27 | 24 | 17 | 10 | 22 |

==== Scholz vs. Merz ====
| Polling firm | Fieldwork date | Sample size | Scholz SPD | Merz Union | Neither |
|---|---|---|---|---|---|
| INSA | 18–19 Feb 2025 | 2,503 | 28 | 36 | 36 |
| Forschungsgruppe Wahlen | 11–13 Feb 2025 | 1,348 | 45 | 46 | 9 |
| Wahlkreisprognose | 11–13 Feb 2025 | 1,700 | 22 | 36 | 42 |
| INSA | 6–7 Feb 2025 | 1,003 | 31 | 41 | 28 |
| Forschungsgruppe Wahlen | 4–6 Feb 2025 | 1,341 | 43 | 48 | 9 |
| Wahlkreisprognose | 1–3 Feb 2025 | 1,900 | 25 | 28 | 47 |
| Forschungsgruppe Wahlen | 27–29 Jan 2025 | 1,428 | 45 | 45 | 10 |
| Forschungsgruppe Wahlen | 21–23 Jan 2025 | 1,345 | 42 | 46 | 12 |
| Wahlkreisprognose | 21–23 Jan 2025 | 1,500 | 27 | 31 | 42 |
| YouGov | 17–20 Jan 2025 | 2,194 | 34 | 36 | 30 |
| Forsa | 14–20 Jan 2025 | 2,502 | 23 | 26 | 51 |
| Wahlkreisprognose | 13–16 Jan 2025 | 2,000 | 30 | 30 | 40 |
| Forschungsgruppe Wahlen | 7–9 Jan 2025 | 1,433 | 41 | 44 | 15 |
| Wahlkreisprognose | 21–28 Dec 2024 | 2,000 | 27 | 27 | 46 |
| Forsa | 17–20 Dec 2024 | 2,008 | 24 | 28 | 48 |
| Forschungsgruppe Wahlen | 17–19 Dec 2024 | 1,362 | 43 | 44 | 13 |
| Infratest dimap | 16–18 Dec 2024 | 1,336 | 31 | 43 | 26 |
| Forsa | 10–16 Dec 2024 | 2,501 | 26 | 26 | 48 |
| Forsa | 3–9 Dec 2024 | 2,501 | 27 | 27 | 46 |
| Forschungsgruppe Wahlen | 3–5 Dec 2024 | 1,433 | 43 | 45 | 12 |
| Wahlkreisprognose | 2–5 Dec 2024 | 2,000 | 26 | 27 | 47 |
| INSA | 28–29 Nov 2024 | 1,001 | 33 | 35 | 32 |
| Forschungsgruppe Wahlen | 19–21 Nov 2024 | 1,399 | 39 | 44 | 17 |
| Wahlkreisprognose | 14–20 Nov 2024 | 2,000 | 20 | 27 | 53 |
| Forsa | 29 Oct – 4 Nov 2024 | 2,500 | 23 | 29 | 48 |
| Forsa | 22–28 Oct 2024 | 2,503 | 24 | 29 | 47 |
| Forsa | 15–21 Oct 2024 | 2,500 | 24 | 28 | 48 |
| Forschungsgruppe Wahlen | 15–17 Oct 2024 | 1,249 | 37 | 48 | 15 |
| Forsa | 8–14 Oct 2024 | 2,501 | 24 | 28 | 48 |
| Forsa | 1–7 Oct 2024 | 2,001 | 25 | 27 | 48 |
| Forsa | 24–30 Sep 2024 | 2,501 | 26 | 27 | 47 |
| Forschungsgruppe Wahlen | 24–26 Sep 2024 | 1.348 | 37 | 43 | 20 |
| INSA | 19–23 Sep 2024 | 1,001 | 27 | 34 | 39 |
| Forsa | 17–23 Sep 2024 | 2,500 | 24 | 28 | 48 |
| INSA | 18–19 Sep 2024 | 1,001 | 30 | 30 | 40 |
| Forsa | 10–16 Sep 2024 | 2,501 | 26 | 26 | 48 |
| INSA | 12–13 Sep 2024 | 1,004 | 21 | 25 | 54 |
| Forsa | 3–9 Sep 2024 | 2,500 | 24 | 28 | 48 |
| Forsa | 27 Aug – 2 Sep 2024 | 2,508 | 23 | 27 | 50 |
| Forsa | 20–26 Aug 2024 | 2,501 | 25 | 25 | 50 |
| Forsa | 13–19 Aug 2024 | 2,503 | 26 | 26 | 48 |
| Forsa | 6–12 Aug 2024 | 2,502 | 27 | 27 | 46 |
| INSA | 8–9 Aug 2024 | 1,004 | 23 | 35 | 42 |
| Forsa | 30 Jul – 5 Aug 2024 | 2,500 | 28 | 28 | 44 |
| Forsa | 23–29 Jul 2024 | 2,501 | 27 | 27 | 46 |
| Forsa | 16–22 Jul 2024 | 2,504 | 26 | 29 | 45 |
| Forsa | 9–15 Jul 2024 | 2,503 | 26 | 29 | 45 |
| Forsa | 2–8 Jul 2024 | 2,504 | 25 | 28 | 47 |
| Forsa | 25 Jun – 1 Jul 2024 | 2,506 | 27 | 28 | 45 |
| Forsa | 18–24 Jun 2024 | 2,505 | 27 | 29 | 44 |
| Forsa | 11–17 Jun 2024 | 2,504 | 28 | 30 | 42 |
| Forsa | 4–10 Jun 2024 | 2,505 | 30 | 28 | 42 |
| Forsa | 28 May – 3 Jun 2024 | 2,506 | 31 | 28 | 41 |
| Forsa | 21–27 May 2024 | 2,503 | 33 | 31 | 36 |
| Wahlkreisprognose | 13–19 May 2024 | 2,500 | 26 | 31 | 43 |
| Forsa | 8–13 May 2024 | 1,503 | 32 | 29 | 39 |
| Wahlkreisprognose | 18–20 Mar 2024 | 1,300 | 26 | 26 | 48 |
| Wahlkreisprognose | 21–22 Feb 2024 | 1,300 | 23 | 25 | 52 |
| INSA | 25–26 Jan 2024 | 1,001 | 21 | 28 | 51 |
| Wahlkreisprognose | 22–24 Jan 2024 | 1,366 | 21 | 32 | 47 |
| Forsa | 9–15 Jan 2024 | 1,502 | 27 | 28 | 45 |
| INSA | 4–5 Jan 2024 | 1,004 | 23 | 26 | 51 |
| Wahlkreisprognose | 2–4 Jan 2024 | 1,500 | 17 | 34 | 49 |
| INSA | 14–15 Dec 2023 | 1,001 | 17 | 18 | 65 |
| Forsa | 28 Nov – 4 Dec 2023 | 2,501 | 36 | 32 | 32 |
| Wahlkreisprognose | 25–27 Nov 2023 | 1,200 | 19 | 29 | 52 |
| Wahlkreisprognose | 23–25 Oct 2023 | 1,300 | 25 | 24 | 51 |
| Wahlkreisprognose | 24–25 Sep 2023 | 1,200 | 27 | 24 | 49 |
| INSA | 7–8 Sep 2023 | 1,001 | 23 | 15 | 62 |
| Wahlkreisprognose | 22–27 Aug 2023 | 1,200 | 23 | 20 | 57 |
| Wahlkreisprognose | 26–27 Jul 2023 | 1,525 | 26 | 24 | 50 |
| Wahlkreisprognose | 22–25 Jun 2023 | 1,399 | 31 | 21 | 48 |
| INSA | 15–16 Jun 2023 | 1,003 | 25 | 16 | 59 |
| Wahlkreisprognose | 1–2 Jun 2023 | 1,100 | 28 | 27 | 45 |
| Wahlkreisprognose | 26–30 Apr 2023 | 1,400 | 36 | 30 | 34 |
| Wahlkreisprognose | 23–26 Mar 2023 | 1,200 | 33 | 21 | 46 |
| Wahlkreisprognose | 27 Feb – 1 Mar 2023 | 1,419 | 33 | 20 | 47 |
| Wahlkreisprognose | 26–27 Jan 2023 | 1,421 | 33 | 19 | 48 |
| Wahlkreisprognose | 15–16 Jan 2023 | 1,500 | 29 | 25 | 46 |
| Wahlkreisprognose | 7–9 Dec 2022 | 1,500 | 38 | 21 | 41 |
| Wahlkreisprognose | 7–8 Nov 2022 | 1,300 | 37 | 21 | 42 |
| Wahlkreisprognose | 18–21 Oct 2022 | 1,910 | 36 | 24 | 40 |
| Wahlkreisprognose | 3–6 Oct 2022 | 1,923 | 36 | 29 | 35 |
| Wahlkreisprognose | 20–22 Sep 2022 | 1,700 | 36 | 24 | 40 |
| Wahlkreisprognose | 16–18 Aug 2022 | 1,433 | 40 | 13 | 47 |
| Wahlkreisprognose | 6–12 Aug 2022 | 2,920 | 42 | 13 | 45 |
| Wahlkreisprognose | 19–20 Jul 2022 | 1,400 | 46 | 16 | 38 |
| Forsa | 12–18 Jul 2022 | 2,501 | 40 | 18 | 42 |
| Forsa | 5–11 Jul 2022 | 2,503 | 43 | 17 | 40 |
| Forsa | 28 Jun – 4 Jul 2022 | 2,502 | 43 | 17 | 40 |
| Forsa | 21–27 Jun 2022 | 2,500 | 42 | 19 | 39 |
| Wahlkreisprognose | 23–26 Jun 2022 | 2,430 | 46 | 15 | 39 |
| Forsa | 14–20 Jun 2022 | 2,504 | 39 | 20 | 41 |
| Forsa | 7–13 Jun 2022 | 2,511 | 38 | 21 | 41 |
| Wahlkreisprognose | 7–8 Jun 2022 | 1,603 | 46 | 16 | 38 |
| Forsa | 31 May – 3 Jun 2022 | 2,002 | 41 | 20 | 39 |
| Wahlkreisprognose | 30 May – 1 Jun 2022 | 1,500 | 45 | 18 | 37 |
| Forsa | 24–30 May 2022 | 2,004 | 39 | 20 | 41 |
| Forsa | 17–23 May 2022 | 2,505 | 41 | 19 | 40 |
| INSA | 20 May 2022 | 1,003 | 26 | 15 | 59 |
| Wahlkreisprognose | 15–16 May 2022 | 1,302 | 42 | 26 | 32 |
| Forsa | 10–16 May 2022 | 2,502 | 42 | 19 | 39 |
| Wahlkreisprognose | 8–9 May 2022 | 1,610 | 46 | 26 | 28 |
| Forsa | 3–9 May 2022 | 2,501 | 42 | 18 | 40 |
| Forsa | 26 Apr – 2 May 2022 | 2,508 | 43 | 19 | 38 |
| Forsa | 19–25 Apr 2022 | 2,507 | 42 | 18 | 40 |
| Wahlkreisprognose | 23 Apr 2022 | 1,007 | 45 | 16 | 39 |
| Forsa | 12–14 Apr 2022 | 1,501 | 43 | 18 | 39 |
| Forsa | 5–11 Apr 2022 | 2,500 | 42 | 18 | 40 |
| Wahlkreisprognose | 3–4 Apr 2022 | 2,450 | 51 | 17 | 32 |
| Forsa | 29 Mar – 4 Apr 2022 | 2,508 | 43 | 18 | 39 |
| Forsa | 22–28 Mar 2022 | 2,507 | 42 | 20 | 38 |
| Forsa | 15–21 Mar 2022 | 2,501 | 44 | 20 | 36 |
| Wahlkreisprognose | 18–20 Mar 2022 | 3,923 | 51.5 | 21.5 | 27 |
| Forsa | 8–14 Mar 2022 | 2,502 | 46 | 19 | 35 |
| Forsa | 1–7 Mar 2022 | 2,501 | 48 | 19 | 33 |
| Forsa | 24–28 Feb 2022 | 1,500 | 45 | 20 | 35 |
| Wahlkreisprognose | 24–27 Feb 2022 | 2,030 | 49 | 19 | 32 |
| Forsa | 15–21 Feb 2022 | 2,500 | 42 | 20 | 38 |
| Wahlkreisprognose | 13–15 Feb 2022 | 1,220 | 43 | 25 | 32 |
| Forsa | 8–14 Feb 2022 | 2,504 | 40 | 21 | 39 |
| Forsa | 1–7 Feb 2022 | 2,502 | 40 | 22 | 38 |
| Wahlkreisprognose | 2–3 Feb 2022 | 2,330 | 42 | 31 | 27 |
| Forsa | 25–31 Jan 2022 | 2,501 | 43 | 21 | 36 |
| Forsa | 18–24 Jan 2022 | 2,502 | 48 | 19 | 33 |
| Forsa | 11–17 Jan 2022 | 2,504 | 48 | 17 | 35 |
| Wahlkreisprognose | 11–12 Jan 2022 | 1,030 | 54 | 19 | 27 |
| Forsa | 3–10 Jan 2022 | 3,003 | 49 | 18 | 33 |
| Forsa | 14–20 Dec 2021 | 2,501 | 50 | 18 | 32 |
| Wahlkreisprognose | 18–19 Dec 2021 | 1,120 | 55 | 20 | 25 |
| Forsa | 23–29 Nov 2021 | 2,509 | 45 | 18 | 37 |
| Forsa | 16–22 Nov 2021 | 2,501 | 45 | 19 | 36 |
| Forsa | 9–15 Nov 2021 | 2,510 | 46 | 19 | 35 |
| Wahlkreisprognose | 11–12 Nov 2021 | 1,004 | 44 | 21 | 35 |
| Forsa | 2–8 Nov 2021 | 2,502 | 52 | 17 | 31 |

==== Merz vs. Habeck ====
| Polling firm | Fieldwork date | Sample size | Merz Union | Habeck Grüne | Neither |
|---|---|---|---|---|---|
| Forschungsgruppe Wahlen | 11–13 Feb 2025 | 1,348 | 51 | 40 | 9 |
| Forschungsgruppe Wahlen | 4–6 Feb 2025 | 1,341 | 49 | 40 | 11 |
| Forschungsgruppe Wahlen | 27–29 Jan 2025 | 1,428 | 47 | 41 | 12 |
| Forschungsgruppe Wahlen | 21–23 Jan 2025 | 1,345 | 50 | 37 | 13 |
| Wahlkreisprognose | 21–23 Jan 2025 | 1,500 | 34 | 23 | 43 |
| Forsa | 14–20 Jan 2025 | 2,502 | 30 | 26 | 44 |
| Wahlkreisprognose | 13–16 Jan 2025 | 2,000 | 38 | 28 | 34 |
| Forschungsgruppe Wahlen | 7–9 Jan 2025 | 1,433 | 44 | 41 | 15 |
| Forschungsgruppe Wahlen | 17–19 Dec 2024 | 1,362 | 48 | 39 | 13 |
| Wahlkreisprognose | 16–18 Aug 2022 | 1,433 | 19 | 30 | 51 |
| Wahlkreisprognose | 6–12 Aug 2022 | 2,920 | 18 | 32 | 50 |

==== Scholz vs. Merz vs. Habeck vs. Weidel vs. Wagenknecht ====
| Polling firm | Fieldwork date | Sample size | Scholz SPD | Merz Union | Habeck Grüne | Weidel AfD | Wagenknecht BSW | None |
|---|---|---|---|---|---|---|---|---|
| Wahlkreisprognose | 11–13 Feb 2025 | 1,700 | 9 | 22 | 14 | 21 | 7 | 27 |
| Wahlkreisprognose | 1–3 Feb 2025 | 1,900 | 14 | 16 | 13 | 20 | 6 | 31 |
| Democracy Institute | 28–30 Jan 2025 | 2,430 | 15 | 26 | 11 | 35 | 13 | – |
| Wahlkreisprognose | 21–23 Jan 2025 | 1,500 | 16 | 18 | 15 | 23 | 5 | 23 |
| Wahlkreisprognose | 13–16 Jan 2025 | 2,000 | 19 | 19 | 18 | 22 | 6 | 16 |
| Wahlkreisprognose | 21–28 Dec 2024 | 2,000 | 18 | 19 | 17 | 18 | 10 | 18 |
| INSA | 6–9 Dec 2024 | 2,004 | 14 | 17 | 12 | 17 | 10 | 31 |
| Wahlkreisprognose | 2–5 Dec 2024 | 2,000 | 21 | 19 | 13 | 17 | 6 | 24 |
| Wahlkreisprognose | 14–20 Nov 2024 | 2,000 | 15 | 22 | 9 | 17 | 9 | 28 |

==== Scholz vs. Weidel ====
| Polling firm | Fieldwork date | Sample size | Scholz SPD | Weidel AfD | Neither |
|---|---|---|---|---|---|
| Wahlkreisprognose | 1–3 Feb 2025 | 1,900 | 34 | 28 | 38 |
| Wahlkreisprognose | 21–23 Jan 2025 | 1,500 | 33 | 27 | 40 |
| Wahlkreisprognose | 13–16 Jan 2025 | 2,000 | 27 | 21 | 52 |

==== Merz vs. Weidel ====
| Polling firm | Fieldwork date | Sample size | Merz Union | Weidel AfD | Neither |
|---|---|---|---|---|---|
| Wahlkreisprognose | 1–3 Feb 2025 | 1,900 | 25 | 33 | 42 |
| Wahlkreisprognose | 21–23 Jan 2025 | 1,500 | 31 | 34 | 35 |
| Wahlkreisprognose | 13–16 Jan 2025 | 2,000 | 29 | 21 | 50 |

==== Scholz vs. Habeck ====
| Polling firm | Fieldwork date | Sample size | Scholz SPD | Habeck Grüne | Neither |
|---|---|---|---|---|---|
| Wahlkreisprognose | 21–23 Jan 2025 | 1,500 | 27 | 13 | 60 |
| Wahlkreisprognose | 13–16 Jan 2025 | 2,000 | 26 | 19 | 55 |
| Wahlkreisprognose | 16–18 Aug 2022 | 1,433 | 36 | 32 | 32 |
| Wahlkreisprognose | 6–12 Aug 2022 | 2,920 | 38 | 33 | 29 |

==== Weidel vs. Wagenknecht ====
| Polling firm | Fieldwork date | Sample size | Weidel AfD | Wagenknecht BSW | Neither |
|---|---|---|---|---|---|
| Wahlkreisprognose | 21–23 Jan 2025 | 1,500 | 32 | 20 | 48 |
| Wahlkreisprognose | 13–16 Jan 2025 | 2,000 | 28 | 21 | 51 |

==== Scholz vs. Merz vs. Habeck vs. Weidel vs. Wagenknecht vs. Lindner ====
| Polling firm | Fieldwork date | Sample size | Scholz SPD | Merz Union | Habeck Grüne | Weidel AfD | Wagenknecht BSW | Lindner FDP | None |
|---|---|---|---|---|---|---|---|---|---|
| YouGov | 17–20 Jan 2025 | 2,194 | 12 | 18 | 17 | 17 | 6 | 4 | 26 |

==== Scholz vs. Merz vs. Habeck ====
| Polling firm | Fieldwork date | Sample size | Scholz SPD | Merz Union | Habeck Grüne | None |
|---|---|---|---|---|---|---|
| Forsa | 2–6 Jan 2025 | 1,501 | 16 | 26 | 22 | 36 |
| Forsa | 17–20 Dec 2024 | 2,008 | 16 | 27 | 23 | 34 |
| Forsa | 10–16 Dec 2024 | 2,501 | 17 | 25 | 24 | 34 |
| Allensbach | 30 Nov – 12 Dec 2024 | 1,362 | 14 | 28 | 13 | 45 |
| Forsa | 3–9 Dec 2024 | 2,501 | 18 | 26 | 25 | 31 |
| Forsa | 26 Nov – 2 Dec 2024 | 2,502 | 16 | 28 | 24 | 32 |
| INSA | 28–29 Nov 2024 | 1,001 | 22 | 30 | 16 | 32 |
| Forsa | 19–25 Nov 2024 | 2,500 | 13 | 30 | 22 | 35 |
| INSA | 21–22 Nov 2024 | 1,001 | 15 | 31 | 18 | 36 |
| Forsa | 12–18 Nov 2024 | 2,500 | 13 | 34 | 21 | 32 |
| INSA | 14–15 Nov 2024 | 1,004 | 16 | 32 | 16 | 36 |
| Forsa | 8–11 Nov 2024 | 1,004 | 16 | 32 | 20 | 32 |
| INSA | 3–4 Oct 2024 | 1,001 | 23 | 31 | 13 | 33 |
| INSA | 26–27 Sep 2024 | 1,002 | 19 | 35 | 16 | 30 |
| INSA | 11–12 Jul 2024 | 1,250 | 17 | 31 | 16 | 36 |
| Forsa | 14–17 May 2024 | 2,001 | 17 | 26 | 18 | 39 |
| Forsa | 7–13 May 2024 | 2,006 | 17 | 25 | 17 | 41 |
| Forsa | 30 Apr – 6 May 2024 | 2,000 | 18 | 23 | 17 | 42 |
| Forsa | 23–29 Apr 2024 | 2,505 | 17 | 23 | 17 | 43 |
| Forsa | 16–22 Apr 2024 | 2,501 | 17 | 22 | 16 | 45 |
| Forsa | 9–15 Apr 2024 | 2,505 | 17 | 22 | 16 | 45 |
| INSA | 11–12 Apr 2024 | 1,003 | 20 | 30 | 14 | 36 |
| Forsa | 2–8 Apr 2024 | 2,506 | 18 | 21 | 17 | 44 |
| Forsa | 26–28 Mar 2024 | 1,508 | 19 | 22 | 17 | 42 |
| Forsa | 19–25 Mar 2024 | 2,503 | 18 | 22 | 17 | 43 |
| Forsa | 12–18 Mar 2024 | 2,500 | 16 | 21 | 18 | 45 |
| Forsa | 5–11 Mar 2024 | 2,502 | 15 | 21 | 19 | 45 |
| Forsa | 27 Feb – 4 Mar 2024 | 2,506 | 15 | 23 | 18 | 44 |
| Forsa | 20–26 Feb 2024 | 2,503 | 15 | 25 | 18 | 42 |
| Forsa | 13–19 Feb 2024 | 2,504 | 14 | 24 | 18 | 44 |
| Forsa | 6–12 Feb 2024 | 2,502 | 15 | 23 | 19 | 43 |
| Forsa | 30 Jan – 5 Feb 2024 | 2,503 | 12 | 25 | 19 | 44 |
| Forsa | 23–29 Jan 2024 | 2,506 | 12 | 24 | 19 | 45 |
| Forsa | 16–22 Jan 2024 | 2,503 | 13 | 25 | 17 | 45 |
| Forsa | 9–15 Jan 2024 | 2,504 | 15 | 24 | 15 | 46 |
| Forsa | 2–8 Jan 2024 | 2,502 | 15 | 24 | 15 | 46 |
| Forsa | 19–22 Dec 2023 | – | 15 | 25 | 17 | 43 |
| Forsa | 12–18 Dec 2023 | 2,501 | 15 | 24 | 18 | 43 |
| Forsa | 5–11 Dec 2023 | 2,501 | 15 | 24 | 18 | 43 |
| Forsa | 28 Nov – 4 Dec 2023 | 2,501 | 16 | 24 | 18 | 42 |
| Forsa | 21–27 Nov 2023 | 2,500 | 17 | 22 | 19 | 42 |
| Forsa | 14–20 Nov 2023 | 2,501 | 19 | 21 | 18 | 42 |
| Forsa | 7–13 Nov 2023 | 2,504 | 19 | 22 | 18 | 41 |
| Forsa | 31 Oct – 6 Nov 2023 | 2,502 | 20 | 21 | 17 | 42 |
| Forsa | 24–30 Sep 2023 | 2,501 | 20 | 20 | 16 | 44 |
| Forsa | 17–23 Sep 2023 | 2,504 | 20 | 21 | 15 | 44 |
| Forsa | 10–16 Sep 2023 | 2,501 | 19 | 20 | 17 | 44 |
| Forsa | 4–9 Sep 2023 | 2,003 | 22 | 20 | 16 | 42 |
| Forsa | 26–29 Sep 2023 | 2,004 | 22 | 20 | 16 | 42 |
| Forsa | 19–25 Sep 2023 | 2,503 | 22 | 20 | 16 | 42 |
| Forsa | 12–18 Sep 2023 | 2,504 | 21 | 19 | 16 | 44 |
| Forsa | 4–11 Sep 2023 | 2,505 | 21 | 19 | 16 | 44 |
| Forsa | 29 Aug – 4 Sep 2023 | 2,506 | 21 | 20 | 16 | 43 |
| Forsa | 22–28 Aug 2023 | 2,504 | 21 | 19 | 15 | 45 |
| Forsa | 15–21 Aug 2023 | 2,506 | 21 | 19 | 15 | 45 |
| Forsa | 8–14 Aug 2023 | 2,501 | 21 | 18 | 15 | 46 |
| Forsa | 1–7 Aug 2023 | 2,502 | 21 | 17 | 16 | 46 |
| Forsa | 25–31 Jul 2023 | 2,500 | 22 | 18 | 17 | 43 |
| Forsa | 18–24 Jul 2023 | 2,504 | 23 | 20 | 16 | 41 |
| Forsa | 11–17 Jul 2023 | 2,502 | 23 | 20 | 17 | 40 |
| Forsa | 4–7 Jul 2023 | 2,003 | 22 | 20 | 16 | 42 |
| Forsa | 27 Jun – 3 Jul 2023 | 2,501 | 21 | 20 | 16 | 43 |
| Forsa | 20–26 Jun 2023 | 2,506 | 23 | 20 | 16 | 41 |
| Forsa | 13–19 Jun 2023 | 2,503 | 25 | 20 | 15 | 40 |
| Forsa | 6–12 Jun 2023 | 2,504 | 25 | 21 | 15 | 39 |
| Forsa | 30 May – 5 Jun 2023 | 2,505 | 25 | 23 | 14 | 38 |
| Forsa | 23–26 May 2023 | 2,001 | 25 | 23 | 14 | 38 |
| Forsa | 16–22 May 2023 | 2,003 | 26 | 22 | 13 | 39 |
| Forsa | 9–15 May 2023 | 2,503 | 24 | 23 | 14 | 39 |
| Forsa | 2–8 May 2023 | 2,505 | 24 | 22 | 15 | 39 |
| Wahlkreisprognose | 26–30 Apr 2023 | 1,400 | 31 | 26 | 8 | 35 |
| Forsa | 25–28 Apr 2023 | 2,007 | 23 | 22 | 16 | 39 |
| Forsa | 18–24 Apr 2023 | 2,506 | 22 | 24 | 16 | 38 |
| Forsa | 11–17 Apr 2023 | 2,508 | 23 | 25 | 17 | 35 |
| Forsa | 4–6 Apr 2023 | 1,501 | 21 | 23 | 18 | 38 |
| Forsa | 28 Mar – 3 Apr 2023 | 2,502 | 23 | 21 | 17 | 39 |
| Forsa | 21–27 Mar 2023 | 2,506 | 24 | 22 | 18 | 36 |
| Wahlkreisprognose | 23–26 Mar 2023 | 1,200 | 29 | 18 | 13 | 40 |
| Forsa | 14–20 Mar 2023 | 2,503 | 26 | 21 | 17 | 36 |
| Forsa | 7–13 Mar 2023 | 2,505 | 27 | 21 | 17 | 35 |
| Forsa | 28 Feb – 6 Mar 2023 | 2,504 | 25 | 20 | 19 | 36 |
| Wahlkreisprognose | 27 Feb – 1 Mar 2023 | 1,419 | 27 | 17 | 11 | 45 |
| Forsa | 21–27 Feb 2023 | 2,501 | 27 | 19 | 19 | 35 |
| Forsa | 14–20 Feb 2023 | 2,510 | 25 | 20 | 19 | 36 |
| Forsa | 7–13 Feb 2023 | 2,505 | 27 | 20 | 20 | 33 |
| Forsa | 31 Jan – 6 Feb 2023 | 2,502 | 26 | 20 | 20 | 34 |
| Forsa | 24–30 Jan 2023 | 2,503 | 25 | 21 | 20 | 34 |
| Wahlkreisprognose | 26–27 Jan 2023 | 1,421 | 26 | 16 | 12 | 46 |
| Forsa | 17–23 Jan 2023 | 2,502 | 23 | 21 | 21 | 35 |
| Wahlkreisprognose | 15–16 Jan 2023 | 1,500 | 22 | 21 | 15 | 42 |
| Forsa | 10–16 Jan 2023 | 2,500 | 22 | 20 | 20 | 38 |
| Forsa | 3–9 Jan 2023 | 2,502 | 21 | 20 | 20 | 39 |
| Forsa | 13–19 Dec 2022 | 2,503 | 23 | 19 | 20 | 38 |
| Forsa | 6–12 Dec 2022 | 2,506 | 24 | 19 | 19 | 38 |
| Wahlkreisprognose | 7–9 Dec 2022 | 1,500 | 24 | 22 | 13 | 41 |
| Forsa | 29 Nov – 5 Dec 2022 | 2,500 | 22 | 20 | 20 | 38 |
| Forsa | 22–28 Nov 2022 | 2,505 | 23 | 20 | 20 | 37 |
| Forsa | 15–21 Nov 2022 | 2,502 | 22 | 20 | 20 | 38 |
| Forsa | 8–14 Nov 2022 | 2,503 | 21 | 20 | 20 | 39 |
| Wahlkreisprognose | 7–8 Nov 2022 | 1,300 | 25 | 22 | 13 | 40 |
| Forsa | 1–7 Nov 2022 | 2,502 | 22 | 19 | 19 | 40 |
| Forsa | 25–31 Oct 2022 | 2,503 | 23 | 19 | 19 | 39 |
| Forsa | 18–24 Oct 2022 | 2,502 | 24 | 19 | 18 | 39 |
| Wahlkreisprognose | 18–21 Oct 2022 | 1,910 | 28 | 19 | 15 | 38 |
| Forsa | 11–17 Oct 2022 | 2,505 | 23 | 19 | 19 | 39 |
| Forsa | 4–10 Oct 2022 | 2,501 | 24 | 18 | 17 | 41 |
| Wahlkreisprognose | 3–6 Oct 2022 | 1,923 | 28 | 25 | 14 | 33 |
| Forsa | 27–30 Sep 2022 | 2,001 | 22 | 20 | 17 | 41 |
| Forsa | 20–26 Sep 2022 | 2,505 | 22 | 22 | 17 | 39 |
| Wahlkreisprognose | 20–22 Sep 2022 | 1,700 | 29 | 25 | 15 | 31 |
| Forsa | 13–19 Sep 2022 | 2,506 | 23 | 22 | 18 | 37 |
| Forsa | 6–13 Sep 2022 | 2,501 | 21 | 20 | 21 | 38 |
| Wahlkreisprognose | 9–11 Sep 2022 | 1,300 | 30 | 24 | 15 | 31 |
| INSA | 9 Sep 2022 | 1,000 | 24 | 23 | 19 | 34 |
| Forsa | 30 Aug – 5 Sep 2022 | 2,500 | 21 | 18 | 25 | 36 |
| Forsa | 23–29 Aug 2022 | 2,503 | 20 | 16 | 27 | 37 |
| Forsa | 16–22 Aug 2022 | 2,505 | 20 | 16 | 25 | 39 |
| INSA | 19 Aug 2022 | 1,002 | 18 | 19 | 25 | 38 |
| Wahlkreisprognose | 16–18 Aug 2022 | 1,433 | 36 | 13 | 30 | 21 |
| Forsa | 9–15 Aug 2022 | 2,500 | 22 | 16 | 26 | 36 |
| Wahlkreisprognose | 6–12 Aug 2022 | 2,920 | 32 | 15 | 28 | 25 |
| Forsa | 2–8 Aug 2022 | 2,504 | 24 | 16 | 27 | 33 |
| Forsa | 26 Jul – 1 Aug 2022 | 2,504 | 23 | 18 | 28 | 31 |
| INSA | 29 Jul 2022 | 1,002 | 24 | 18 | 21 | 37 |
| Forsa | 19–25 Jul 2022 | 2,510 | 25 | 17 | 30 | 28 |
| Wahlkreisprognose | 19–20 Jul 2022 | 1,400 | 39 | 11 | 32 | 18 |
| Forsa | 15–18 Jul 2022 | 2,002 | 26 | 17 | 31 | 26 |
| Wahlkreisprognose | 23–26 Jun 2022 | 2,430 | 40 | 13 | 31 | 16 |
| Wahlkreisprognose | 7–8 Jun 2022 | 1,603 | 38 | 13 | 27 | 22 |
| Wahlkreisprognose | 30 May – 1 Jun 2022 | 1,500 | 35 | 14 | 29 | 21 |
| Wahlkreisprognose | 15–16 May 2022 | 1,302 | 37 | 21 | 25 | 17 |
| Wahlkreisprognose | 8–9 May 2022 | 1,610 | 38 | 21 | 24 | 17 |

==== Scholz vs. Merz vs. Weidel ====
| Polling firm | Fieldwork date | Sample size | Scholz SPD | Merz Union | Weidel AfD | None |
|---|---|---|---|---|---|---|
| Wahlkreisprognose | 22–27 Aug 2023 | 1,200 | 21 | 15 | 17 | 47 |
| Wahlkreisprognose | 26–27 Jul 2023 | 1,525 | 24 | 18 | 16 | 42 |
| Wahlkreisprognose | 22–25 Jun 2023 | 1,399 | 27 | 15 | 15 | 43 |
| Wahlkreisprognose | 1–2 Jun 2023 | 1,100 | 25 | 22 | 16 | 37 |
| Wahlkreisprognose | 26–30 Apr 2023 | 1,400 | 34 | 22 | 11 | 33 |
| Wahlkreisprognose | 23–26 Mar 2023 | 1,200 | 33 | 18 | 13 | 36 |
| Wahlkreisprognose | 27 Feb – 1 Mar 2023 | 1,419 | 31 | 15 | 13 | 41 |
| Wahlkreisprognose | 26–27 Jan 2023 | 1,421 | 30 | 14 | 14 | 42 |
| Wahlkreisprognose | 15–16 Jan 2023 | 1,500 | 24 | 17 | 16 | 43 |
| Wahlkreisprognose | 7–9 Dec 2022 | 1,500 | 31 | 18 | 13 | 38 |
| Wahlkreisprognose | 7–8 Nov 2022 | 1,300 | 26 | 18 | 17 | 39 |

=== Speculative Chancellor candidates ===
These following speculative polls were conducted before or shortly after the announcement of each party's Chancellor candidate, and gauged opinion on various politicians who were considered to be plausible candidates for their respective parties.

==== Pistorius vs. Merz ====
| Polling firm | Fieldwork date | Sample size | Pistorius SPD | Merz Union | Neither |
|---|---|---|---|---|---|
| Wahlkreisprognose | 21–23 Jan 2025 | 1,500 | 43 | 24 | 33 |
| Wahlkreisprognose | 13–16 Jan 2025 | 2,000 | 36 | 21 | 43 |
| Forschungsgruppe Wahlen | 19–21 Nov 2024 | 1,399 | 59 | 28 | 13 |
| Forsa | 7 Nov 2024 | 1,181 | 39 | 25 | 36 |
| INSA | 19–23 Sep 2024 | 1,001 | 33 | 29 | 38 |
| INSA | 4–5 Jan 2024 | 1,004 | 25 | 23 | 52 |
| Wahlkreisprognose | 2–4 Jan 2024 | 1,500 | 32 | 28 | 40 |
| Wahlkreisprognose | 25–27 Nov 2023 | 1,200 | 30 | 29 | 41 |
| Wahlkreisprognose | 22–27 Aug 2023 | 1,200 | 41 | 18 | 41 |

==== Pistorius vs. Merz vs. Habeck ====
| Polling firm | Fieldwork date | Sample size | Pistorius SPD | Merz Union | Habeck Grüne | None |
|---|---|---|---|---|---|---|
| INSA | 21–22 Nov 2024 | 1,001 | 33 | 24 | 14 | 29 |
| INSA | 14–15 Nov 2024 | 1,004 | 27 | 30 | 13 | 30 |

==== Pistorius vs. Merz vs. Habeck vs. Weidel ====
| Polling firm | Fieldwork date | Sample size | Pistorius SPD | Merz Union | Habeck Grüne | Weidel AfD | None |
|---|---|---|---|---|---|---|---|
| INSA | 11–14 Oct 2024 | 2,002 | 27 | 19 | 13 | 20 | 21 |

==== Scholz vs. Söder ====
| Polling firm | Fieldwork date | Sample size | Scholz SPD | Söder Union | Neither |
|---|---|---|---|---|---|
| INSA | 8–9 Aug 2024 | 1,004 | 23 | 41 | 36 |
| Forsa | 8–13 May 2024 | 1,503 | 30 | 36 | 34 |
| Forsa | 9–15 Jan 2024 | 1,502 | 27 | 40 | 33 |
| INSA | 4–5 Jan 2024 | 1,004 | 20 | 36 | 44 |
| INSA | 7–8 Sep 2023 | 1,001 | 26 | 32 | 42 |
| INSA | 15–16 Jun 2023 | 1,003 | 30 | 31 | 39 |
| INSA | 20 May 2022 | 1,003 | 32 | 29 | 39 |
| Wahlkreisprognose | 18–19 Dec 2021 | 1,120 | 49 | 28 | 23 |
| Forsa | 2–8 Nov 2021 | 2,502 | 39 | 33 | 28 |
| Forsa | 5–11 Oct 2021 | 2,503 | 37 | 33 | 30 |

==== Scholz vs. Wüst ====
| Polling firm | Fieldwork date | Sample size | Scholz SPD | Wüst Union | Neither |
|---|---|---|---|---|---|
| INSA | 8–9 Aug 2024 | 1,004 | 23 | 26 | 51 |
| Forsa | 8–13 May 2024 | 1,503 | 28 | 28 | 44 |
| Forsa | 9–15 Jan 2024 | 1,502 | 25 | 36 | 39 |
| INSA | 15–16 Jun 2023 | 1,003 | 29 | 18 | 53 |
| INSA | 20 May 2022 | 1,003 | 32 | 14 | 54 |

==== Scholz vs. Söder vs. Habeck ====
| Polling firm | Fieldwork date | Sample size | Scholz SPD | Söder Union | Habeck Grüne | None |
|---|---|---|---|---|---|---|
| INSA | 11–12 Jul 2024 | 1,250 | 17 | 37 | 16 | 30 |

==== Scholz vs. Merz vs. Baerbock vs. Weidel vs. Wagenknecht ====
| Polling firm | Fieldwork date | Sample size | Scholz SPD | Merz Union | Baerbock Grüne | Weidel AfD | Wagenknecht BSW | None |
|---|---|---|---|---|---|---|---|---|
| Wahlkreisprognose | 13–19 May 2024 | 2,500 | 14 | 18 | 9 | 13 | 9 | 37 |
| Wahlkreisprognose | 18–20 Mar 2024 | 1,300 | 15 | 18 | 10 | 11 | 12 | 34 |
| Wahlkreisprognose | 21–22 Feb 2024 | 1,300 | 13 | 17 | 10 | 12 | 11 | 37 |
| Wahlkreisprognose | 22–24 Jan 2024 | 1,366 | 11 | 19 | 10 | 14 | 10 | 36 |
| Wahlkreisprognose | 2–4 Jan 2024 | 1,500 | 10 | 22 | 11 | 18 | 8 | 31 |
| Wahlkreisprognose | 25–27 Nov 2023 | 1,200 | 16 | 19 | 9 | 17 | 8 | 31 |
| Wahlkreisprognose | 23–25 Oct 2023 | 1,300 | 18 | 16 | 9 | 14 | 13 | 30 |

==== Scholz vs. Merz vs. Baerbock ====
| Polling firm | Fieldwork date | Sample size | Scholz SPD | Merz Union | Baerbock Grüne | None |
|---|---|---|---|---|---|---|
| Forsa | 14–17 May 2024 | 2,001 | 20 | 29 | 17 | 34 |
| Forsa | 7–13 May 2024 | 2,006 | 20 | 28 | 15 | 37 |
| Forsa | 30 Apr – 6 May 2024 | 2,000 | 21 | 26 | 16 | 37 |
| Forsa | 23–29 Apr 2024 | 2,505 | 21 | 26 | 16 | 37 |
| Forsa | 16–22 Apr 2024 | 2,501 | 20 | 25 | 16 | 39 |
| Forsa | 9–15 Apr 2024 | 2,505 | 20 | 25 | 17 | 38 |
| INSA | 11–12 Apr 2024 | 1,003 | 18 | 32 | 17 | 33 |
| Forsa | 2–8 Apr 2024 | 1,506 | 21 | 24 | 16 | 39 |
| Forsa | 26–28 Mar 2024 | 1,508 | 22 | 25 | 16 | 37 |
| Forsa | 19–25 Mar 2024 | 2,503 | 21 | 25 | 16 | 38 |
| Forsa | 12–18 Mar 2024 | 2,500 | 19 | 24 | 17 | 40 |
| Forsa | 5–11 Mar 2024 | 2,502 | 18 | 24 | 19 | 39 |
| Forsa | 27 Feb – 4 Mar 2024 | 2,506 | 18 | 26 | 17 | 39 |
| Forsa | 20–26 Feb 2024 | 2,503 | 18 | 27 | 18 | 37 |
| Forsa | 13–19 Feb 2024 | 2,504 | 17 | 27 | 18 | 38 |
| Forsa | 6–12 Feb 2024 | 2,502 | 18 | 26 | 18 | 38 |
| Forsa | 30 Jan – 5 Feb 2024 | 2,503 | 16 | 28 | 18 | 38 |
| Forsa | 23–29 Jan 2024 | 2,506 | 15 | 28 | 17 | 40 |
| Forsa | 16–22 Jan 2024 | 2,503 | 16 | 28 | 16 | 40 |
| Forsa | 9–15 Jan 2024 | 2,504 | 17 | 27 | 15 | 41 |
| Forsa | 2–8 Jan 2024 | 2,502 | 17 | 27 | 15 | 41 |
| Forsa | 19–22 Dec 2023 | – | 18 | 28 | 17 | 37 |
| Forsa | 12–18 Dec 2023 | 2,501 | 19 | 27 | 17 | 37 |
| Forsa | 5–11 Dec 2023 | 2,501 | 18 | 28 | 17 | 37 |
| Forsa | 28 Nov – 4 Dec 2023 | 2,501 | 19 | 27 | 17 | 37 |
| Forsa | 21–27 Nov 2023 | 2,500 | 19 | 25 | 17 | 39 |
| Forsa | 14–20 Nov 2023 | 2,501 | 22 | 24 | 16 | 38 |
| Forsa | 7–13 Nov 2023 | 2,504 | 22 | 25 | 16 | 37 |
| Forsa | 31 Oct – 6 Nov 2023 | 2,502 | 23 | 24 | 16 | 37 |
| Forsa | 24–30 Sep 2023 | 2,501 | 22 | 23 | 17 | 38 |
| Forsa | 17–23 Sep 2023 | 2,504 | 23 | 23 | 17 | 37 |
| Forsa | 10–16 Sep 2023 | 2,501 | 22 | 22 | 18 | 38 |
| Forsa | 4–9 Sep 2023 | 2,003 | 23 | 22 | 18 | 37 |
| Forsa | 26–29 Sep 2023 | 2,004 | 24 | 22 | 17 | 37 |
| Forsa | 19–25 Sep 2023 | 2,503 | 24 | 22 | 18 | 36 |
| Forsa | 12–18 Sep 2023 | 2,504 | 23 | 21 | 17 | 39 |
| Forsa | 4–11 Sep 2023 | 2,505 | 23 | 22 | 17 | 38 |
| Forsa | 29 Aug – 4 Sep 2023 | 2,506 | 22 | 22 | 17 | 39 |
| Forsa | 22–28 Aug 2023 | 2,504 | 22 | 21 | 17 | 40 |
| Forsa | 15–21 Aug 2023 | 2,506 | 22 | 21 | 16 | 41 |
| Forsa | 8–14 Aug 2023 | 2,501 | 22 | 20 | 16 | 42 |
| Forsa | 1–7 Aug 2023 | 2,502 | 22 | 19 | 18 | 41 |
| Forsa | 25–31 Jul 2023 | 2,500 | 24 | 21 | 18 | 37 |
| Forsa | 18–24 Jul 2023 | 2,504 | 25 | 23 | 17 | 35 |
| Forsa | 11–17 Jul 2023 | 2,502 | 25 | 22 | 18 | 35 |
| Forsa | 4–7 Jul 2023 | 2,003 | 24 | 22 | 18 | 36 |
| Forsa | 27 Jun – 3 Jul 2023 | 2,501 | 23 | 23 | 19 | 35 |
| Forsa | 20–26 Jun 2023 | 2,506 | 24 | 23 | 19 | 34 |
| Forsa | 13–19 Jun 2023 | 2,503 | 26 | 23 | 19 | 32 |
| Forsa | 6–12 Jun 2023 | 2,504 | 26 | 23 | 19 | 32 |
| Forsa | 30 May – 5 Jun 2023 | 2,505 | 26 | 25 | 19 | 30 |
| Forsa | 23–26 May 2023 | 2,001 | 27 | 25 | 19 | 29 |
| Forsa | 16–22 May 2023 | 2,003 | 27 | 24 | 18 | 31 |
| Forsa | 9–15 May 2023 | 2,503 | 25 | 25 | 18 | 32 |
| Forsa | 2–8 May 2023 | 2,505 | 26 | 24 | 18 | 32 |
| Wahlkreisprognose | 26–30 Apr 2023 | 1,400 | 30 | 25 | 13 | 32 |
| Forsa | 25–28 Apr 2023 | 2,007 | 25 | 25 | 19 | 31 |
| Forsa | 18–24 Apr 2023 | 2,506 | 24 | 26 | 19 | 31 |
| Forsa | 11–17 Apr 2023 | 2,508 | 25 | 27 | 18 | 30 |
| Forsa | 4–6 Apr 2023 | 1,501 | 24 | 25 | 19 | 32 |
| Forsa | 28 Mar – 3 Apr 2023 | 2,502 | 24 | 23 | 20 | 33 |
| Forsa | 21–27 Mar 2023 | 2,506 | 26 | 24 | 20 | 30 |
| Wahlkreisprognose | 23–26 Mar 2023 | 1,200 | 28 | 18 | 14 | 40 |
| Forsa | 14–20 Mar 2023 | 2,503 | 28 | 24 | 19 | 29 |
| Forsa | 7–13 Mar 2023 | 2,505 | 28 | 23 | 18 | 31 |
| Forsa | 28 Feb – 6 Mar 2023 | 2,504 | 28 | 23 | 19 | 30 |
| Wahlkreisprognose | 27 Feb – 1 Mar 2023 | 1,419 | 26 | 17 | 14 | 43 |
| Forsa | 21–27 Feb 2023 | 2,501 | 30 | 22 | 18 | 30 |
| Forsa | 14–20 Feb 2023 | 2,510 | 28 | 22 | 19 | 31 |
| Forsa | 7–13 Feb 2023 | 2,505 | 30 | 22 | 19 | 29 |
| Forsa | 31 Jan – 6 Feb 2023 | 2,502 | 30 | 22 | 18 | 30 |
| Forsa | 24–30 Jan 2023 | 2,503 | 27 | 23 | 19 | 31 |
| Wahlkreisprognose | 26–27 Jan 2023 | 1,421 | 26 | 15 | 15 | 44 |
| Forsa | 17–23 Jan 2023 | 2,502 | 25 | 24 | 22 | 29 |
| Wahlkreisprognose | 15–16 Jan 2023 | 1,500 | 23 | 23 | 20 | 34 |
| Forsa | 10–16 Jan 2023 | 2,500 | 24 | 23 | 23 | 30 |
| Forsa | 3–9 Jan 2023 | 2,502 | 24 | 23 | 22 | 31 |
| Forsa | 13–19 Dec 2022 | 2,503 | 24 | 22 | 21 | 33 |
| Forsa | 6–12 Dec 2022 | 2,506 | 24 | 22 | 22 | 32 |
| Wahlkreisprognose | 7–9 Dec 2022 | 1,500 | 26 | 18 | 15 | 41 |
| Forsa | 29 Nov – 5 Dec 2022 | 2,500 | 24 | 22 | 22 | 32 |
| Forsa | 22–28 Nov 2022 | 2,505 | 24 | 22 | 22 | 32 |
| Forsa | 15–21 Nov 2022 | 2,502 | 25 | 22 | 22 | 31 |
| Forsa | 8–14 Nov 2022 | 2,503 | 24 | 22 | 22 | 32 |
| Wahlkreisprognose | 7–8 Nov 2022 | 1,300 | 27 | 17 | 14 | 42 |
| Forsa | 1–7 Nov 2022 | 2,502 | 24 | 21 | 20 | 35 |
| Forsa | 25–31 Oct 2022 | 2,503 | 25 | 20 | 20 | 35 |
| Forsa | 18–24 Oct 2022 | 2,502 | 25 | 20 | 19 | 36 |
| Wahlkreisprognose | 18–21 Oct 2022 | 1,910 | 29 | 21 | 16 | 34 |
| Forsa | 11–17 Oct 2022 | 2,505 | 24 | 21 | 21 | 34 |
| Forsa | 4–10 Oct 2022 | 2,501 | 25 | 20 | 20 | 35 |
| Wahlkreisprognose | 3–6 Oct 2022 | 1,923 | 28 | 24 | 16 | 32 |
| Forsa | 27–30 Sep 2022 | 2,001 | 23 | 22 | 19 | 36 |
| Forsa | 20–26 Sep 2022 | 2,505 | 23 | 23 | 19 | 35 |
| Wahlkreisprognose | 20–22 Sep 2022 | 1,700 | 28 | 24 | 17 | 31 |
| Forsa | 13–19 Sep 2022 | 2,506 | 23 | 23 | 20 | 34 |
| Forsa | 6–13 Sep 2022 | 2,501 | 23 | 23 | 20 | 34 |
| Forsa | 30 Aug – 5 Sep 2022 | 2,500 | 23 | 21 | 23 | 33 |
| Forsa | 23–29 Aug 2022 | 2,503 | 23 | 19 | 24 | 34 |
| Forsa | 16–22 Aug 2022 | 2,505 | 26 | 17 | 23 | 34 |
| Forsa | 9–15 Aug 2022 | 2,500 | 29 | 17 | 22 | 32 |
| Wahlkreisprognose | 8–9 May 2022 | 1,610 | 38 | 20 | 23 | 19 |
| Wahlkreisprognose | 23 Apr 2022 | 1,007 | 37 | 13 | 24 | 26 |

==== Pistorius vs. Merz vs. Baerbock vs. Weidel vs. Wagenknecht ====
| Polling firm | Fieldwork date | Sample size | Pistorius SPD | Merz Union | Baerbock Grüne | Weidel AfD | Wagenknecht BSW | None |
|---|---|---|---|---|---|---|---|---|
| Wahlkreisprognose | 18–20 Mar 2024 | 1,300 | 27 | 18 | 12 | 11 | 11 | 21 |
| Wahlkreisprognose | 25–27 Nov 2023 | 1,200 | 31 | 12 | 10 | 16 | 10 | 21 |

==== Pistorius vs. Söder ====
| Polling firm | Fieldwork date | Sample size | Pistorius SPD | Söder Union | Neither |
|---|---|---|---|---|---|
| INSA | 4–5 Jan 2024 | 1,004 | 25 | 34 | 41 |

==== Scholz vs. Merz vs. Baerbock vs. Weidel ====
| Polling firm | Fieldwork date | Sample size | Scholz SPD | Merz Union | Baerbock Grüne | Weidel AfD | None |
|---|---|---|---|---|---|---|---|
| Wahlkreisprognose | 24–25 Sep 2023 | 1.200 | 20 | 16 | 15 | 18 | 31 |
| Forsa | 20–26 Jun 2023 | 2.506 | 25 | 23 | 19 | 9 | 24 |

==== Scholz vs. Günther ====
| Polling firm | Fieldwork date | Sample size | Scholz SPD | Günther Union | Neither |
|---|---|---|---|---|---|
| INSA | 20 May 2022 | 1,003 | 32 | 12 | 56 |

==== Scholz vs. Röttgen ====
| Polling firm | Fieldwork date | Sample size | Scholz SPD | Röttgen Union | Neither |
|---|---|---|---|---|---|
| Forsa | 23–29 Nov 2021 | 2,509 | 45 | 19 | 36 |
| Forsa | 16–22 Nov 2021 | 2,501 | 45 | 20 | 35 |
| Forsa | 9–15 Nov 2021 | 2,510 | 45 | 21 | 34 |
| Wahlkreisprognose | 11–12 Nov 2021 | 1,004 | 41 | 20 | 39 |
| Forsa | 2–8 Nov 2021 | 2,502 | 51 | 20 | 29 |

==== Scholz vs. Braun ====
| Polling firm | Fieldwork date | Sample size | Scholz SPD | Braun Union | Neither |
|---|---|---|---|---|---|
| Forsa | 23–29 Nov 2021 | 2,509 | 50 | 11 | 39 |
| Forsa | 16–22 Nov 2021 | 2,501 | 50 | 12 | 38 |
| Wahlkreisprognose | 11–12 Nov 2021 | 1,004 | 42 | 22 | 36 |

==== Scholz vs. Laschet ====
| Polling firm | Fieldwork date | Sample size | Scholz SPD | Laschet Union | Neither |
|---|---|---|---|---|---|
| YouGov | 19–23 Nov 2021 | 2,167 | 46 | 6 | 48 |
| Forsa | 26 Oct – 1 Nov 2021 | 2,501 | 50 | 8 | 42 |
| Forsa | 19–25 Oct 2021 | 2,510 | 52 | 8 | 40 |
| Forsa | 12–18 Oct 2021 | 2,502 | 53 | 8 | 39 |
| Forsa | 5–11 Oct 2021 | 2,503 | 52 | 8 | 40 |
| Forsa | 27 Sep – 4 Oct 2021 | 3,004 | 52 | 9 | 39 |
| Forschungsgruppe Wahlen | 28–30 Sep 2021 | 1,249 | 76 | 13 | 11 |
| Infratest dimap | 27 Sep 2021 | 1,084 | 62 | 16 | 22 |
| Forsa | 27 Sep 2021 | 1,006 | 56 | 11 | 33 |
| YouGov | 26 Sep 2021 | 1,596 | 43 | 13 | 43 |

==== Scholz vs. Kretschmer ====
| Polling firm | Fieldwork date | Sample size | Scholz SPD | Kretschmer Union | Neither |
|---|---|---|---|---|---|
| Wahlkreisprognose | 11–12 Nov 2021 | 1,004 | 41 | 19.5 | 39.5 |

== Preferred coalition ==
| Polling firm | Fieldwork date | Sample size | SPD Grüne | Union FDP | SPD Grüne FDP | Union SPD | Union Grüne | Union Grüne FDP | Union SPD Grüne | Union SPD FDP | SPD Grüne Linke | SPD FDP | Union AfD (Note: Coalition would break the Cordon sanitaire/Firewall against the far-right in Germany with the AfD.) |
|---|---|---|---|---|---|---|---|---|---|---|---|---|---|
| Infratest dimap | 10–12 Feb 2025 | 1,579 | – | 11 | – | 32 | 16 | – | – | – | – | – | 17 |
| Forsa | 6–7 Feb 2025 | 1,001 | – | – | – | 43 | 33 | – | – | – | – | – | 17 |
| Infratest dimap | 3–5 Feb 2025 | 1,302 | – | 13 | – | 31 | 14 | – | – | – | – | – | 19 |
| INSA | 31 Jan – 3 Feb 2025 | 2,004 | – | – | – | 27 | 13 | – | – | – | – | – | 24 |
| Ipsos | 30–31 Jan 2025 | 1,000 | – | – | – | 18 | 5 | 3 | 8 | 7 | – | – | 23 |
| Infratest dimap | 27–29 Jan 2025 | 1,336 | – | 12 | – | 32 | 16 | – | – | – | – | – | 18 |
| INSA | 24–27 Jan 2025 | 2,006 | – | – | – | 29 | 13 | – | – | – | – | – | 25 |
| INSA | 17–20 Jan 2025 | 2,008 | – | 12 | – | 24 | 12 | – | – | – | – | – | 25 |
| INSA | 10–13 Jan 2025 | 2,005 | – | 12 | – | 24 | 11 | – | – | – | – | – | 20 |
| Infratest dimap | 16–18 Dec 2024 | 1,336 | – | 12 | – | 29 | 19 | – | – | – | – | – | 15 |
| Ipsos | 29 Nov – 1 Dec 2024 | 1,000 | – | – | – | 22 | 7 | 3 | 9 | 6 | – | – | 18 |
| INSA | 22–25 Nov 2024 | 1,002 | – | 13 | – | 29 | 13 | – | – | – | – | – | 24 |
| Forschungsgruppe Wahlen | 19–21 Nov 2024 | 1,399 | 11 | 7 | 0 | 30 | 9 | – | – | – | 2 | 0 | – |
| Infratest dimap | 18–20 Nov 2024 | 1,318 | – | 12 | – | 31 | 15 | – | – | – | – | – | 16 |
| Forsa | 7–8 Nov 2024 | 1,008 | – | 15 | – | 34 | 17 | 4 | – | – | – | – | – |
| Forschungsgruppe Wahlen | 5–7 Nov 2024 | 1,231 | 13 | 10 | 1 | 23 | 6 | – | – | – | 1 | 1 | – |
| Forschungsgruppe Wahlen | 15–17 Oct 2024 | 1,249 | 13 | 7 | 0 | 23 | 7 | – | – | – | 2 | 1 | – |
| Forschungsgruppe Wahlen | 24–26 Sep 2024 | 1,348 | 13 | 6 | 1 | 21 | 4 | – | – | – | 1 | 1 | – |
| Forschungsgruppe Wahlen | 3–5 Sep 2024 | 1,328 | 8 | 8 | 0 | 23 | 6 | – | – | – | 2 | 0 | – |
| Forschungsgruppe Wahlen | 12–14 Aug 2024 | 1,334 | 15 | 10 | 1 | 17 | 7 | – | – | – | 2 | 1 | – |
| Forschungsgruppe Wahlen | 9–11 Jul 2024 | 1,341 | 12 | 13 | 1 | 18 | 8 | – | – | – | 2 | 0 | – |
| Forschungsgruppe Wahlen | 25–27 May 2024 | 1,186 | 9 | 11 | 2 | 17 | 9 | – | – | – | 2 | 1 | – |
| Forschungsgruppe Wahlen | 10–12 May 2024 | 1,334 | 9 | 10 | 2 | 19 | 8 | – | – | – | 1 | 1 | – |
| Forschungsgruppe Wahlen | 14–16 May 2024 | 1,247 | 13 | 10 | 1 | 23 | 7 | – | – | – | 2 | 2 | – |
| Forsa | 26–29 Apr 2024 | 1,007 | – | – | 10 | 21 | 10 | 4 | – | 11 | – | – | – |
| Forschungsgruppe Wahlen | 23–25 Apr 2024 | 1,228 | 17 | 13 | 2 | 17 | 7 | – | – | – | 2 | 1 | – |
| Forschungsgruppe Wahlen | 9–11 Apr 2024 | 1,254 | 11 | 11 | 2 | 20 | 8 | – | – | – | 2 | 1 | – |
| Forschungsgruppe Wahlen | 19–21 Mar 2024 | 1,296 | 12 | 11 | 2 | 20 | 8 | – | – | – | 2 | 1 | – |
| Forschungsgruppe Wahlen | 5–7 Mar 2024 | 1,260 | 15 | 9 | 1 | 20 | 7 | – | – | – | 2 | 1 | – |
| Forschungsgruppe Wahlen | 20–22 Feb 2024 | 1,294 | 12 | 13 | 2 | 18 | 9 | – | – | – | 2 | 1 | – |
| Forschungsgruppe Wahlen | 30 Jan – 1 Feb 2024 | 1,217 | 10 | 9 | 2 | 23 | 8 | – | – | – | 1 | 1 | – |
| Forschungsgruppe Wahlen | 9–11 Jan 2024 | 1,337 | 13 | 8 | 1 | 19 | 7 | – | – | – | 2 | 1 | – |
| Forschungsgruppe Wahlen | 12–14 Dec 2023 | 1,146 | 13 | 14 | 2 | 16 | 6 | – | – | – | 1 | 1 | – |
| Forschungsgruppe Wahlen | 21–23 Nov 2023 | 1,242 | 15 | 10 | 1 | 19 | 8 | – | – | – | 2 | 1 | – |
| Forschungsgruppe Wahlen | 7–9 Nov 2023 | 1,234 | 16 | 9 | 2 | 17 | 10 | – | – | – | 2 | 1 | – |
| Forschungsgruppe Wahlen | 17–19 Oct 2023 | 1,252 | 13 | 10 | 1 | 18 | 8 | – | – | – | 2 | 1 | – |
| Forschungsgruppe Wahlen | 12–14 Sep 2023 | 1,201 | 18 | 13 | 3 | 14 | 7 | – | – | – | 3 | 1 | – |
| Forschungsgruppe Wahlen | 15–17 Aug 2023 | 1,288 | 16 | 11 | 3 | 15 | 6 | – | – | – | 2 | 2 | – |
| Forschungsgruppe Wahlen | 11–13 Jul 2023 | 1,346 | 14 | 11 | 3 | 15 | 8 | – | – | – | 4 | 1 | – |
| Forschungsgruppe Wahlen | 27–29 Jun 2023 | 1,379 | 17 | 10 | 2 | 19 | 6 | – | – | – | 3 | 1 | – |
| Forschungsgruppe Wahlen | 13–15 Jun 2023 | 1,224 | 19 | 11 | 3 | 19 | 6 | – | – | – | 2 | 1 | – |
| Forschungsgruppe Wahlen | 23–25 May 2023 | 1,257 | 15 | 11 | 3 | 17 | 7 | – | – | – | 4 | 1 | – |
| Forschungsgruppe Wahlen | 2–4 May 2023 | 1,225 | 16 | 13 | 3 | 15 | 7 | – | – | – | 3 | 1 | – |
| Forschungsgruppe Wahlen | 18–20 Apr 2023 | 1,266 | 19 | 12 | 2 | 16 | 9 | – | – | – | 2 | 1 | – |
| Forschungsgruppe Wahlen | 28–30 Mar 2023 | 1,379 | 18 | 12 | 3 | 15 | 7 | – | – | – | 2 | 2 | – |
| Forschungsgruppe Wahlen | 14–16 Mar 2023 | 1,146 | 21 | 11 | 4 | 14 | 9 | – | – | – | 2 | 2 | – |
| Forschungsgruppe Wahlen | 28 Feb – 2 Mar 2023 | 1,165 | 19 | 10 | 2 | 17 | 10 | – | – | – | 2 | 2 | – |
| Forschungsgruppe Wahlen | 14–16 Feb 2023 | 1,361 | 18 | 10 | 3 | 13 | 12 | – | – | – | 3 | 1 | – |
| Forschungsgruppe Wahlen | 24–26 Jan 2023 | 1,345 | 20 | 10 | 5 | 10 | 11 | – | – | – | 2 | 1 | – |
| Forschungsgruppe Wahlen | 10–12 Jan 2023 | 1,259 | 19 | 11 | 4 | 12 | 9 | – | – | – | 3 | 2 | – |
| Forschungsgruppe Wahlen | 12–15 Dec 2022 | 1,365 | 21 | 11 | 4 | 11 | 11 | – | – | – | 2 | 2 | – |
| Forschungsgruppe Wahlen | 22–24 Nov 2022 | 1,273 | 21 | 12 | 3 | 12 | 9 | – | – | – | 2 | 1 | – |
| Forschungsgruppe Wahlen | 8–10 Nov 2022 | 1,310 | 24 | 9 | 3 | 11 | 11 | – | – | – | 3 | 2 | – |
| Forschungsgruppe Wahlen | 18–20 Oct 2022 | 1,389 | 23 | 11 | 3 | 11 | 9 | – | – | – | 2 | 2 | – |
| Forschungsgruppe Wahlen | 27–29 Sep 2022 | 1,355 | 20 | 11 | 5 | 10 | 9 | – | – | – | 3 | 2 | – |
| Forschungsgruppe Wahlen | 6–8 Sep 2022 | 1,299 | 18 | 13 | 6 | 10 | 9 | – | – | – | 3 | 3 | – |
| Forschungsgruppe Wahlen | 9–11 Aug 2022 | 1,389 | 19 | 8 | 6 | 10 | 13 | – | – | – | 4 | 1 | – |
| Forschungsgruppe Wahlen | 12–14 Jul 2022 | 1,167 | 19 | 7 | 5 | 8 | 14 | – | – | – | 2 | 1 | – |
| Forschungsgruppe Wahlen | 28–30 Jun 2022 | 1,186 | 22 | 8 | 5 | 11 | 15 | – | – | – | 2 | 1 | – |
| Forschungsgruppe Wahlen | 13–15 Jun 2022 | 1,133 | 20 | 7 | 6 | 10 | 15 | – | – | – | 3 | 3 | – |
| Forschungsgruppe Wahlen | 17–19 May 2022 | 1,162 | 22 | 8 | 7 | 10 | 16 | – | – | – | 2 | 1 | – |
| Forschungsgruppe Wahlen | 26–28 Apr 2022 | 1,170 | 21 | 10 | 10 | 10 | 7 | – | – | – | 4 | 2 | – |
| Forschungsgruppe Wahlen | 5–7 Apr 2022 | 1,230 | 23 | 8 | 9 | 14 | 7 | – | – | – | 4 | 2 | – |
| Forschungsgruppe Wahlen | 8–10 Mar 2022 | 1,345 | 18 | 11 | 12 | 15 | 5 | – | – | – | 3 | 4 | – |
| Forschungsgruppe Wahlen | 21–23 Feb 2022 | 1,103 | 17 | 11 | 9 | 12 | 5 | – | – | – | 5 | 3 | – |
| Forschungsgruppe Wahlen | 8–10 Feb 2022 | 1,224 | 16 | 13 | 11 | 15 | 5 | – | – | – | 4 | 2 | – |
| Forschungsgruppe Wahlen | 25–27 Jan 2022 | 1,249 | 16 | 11 | 11 | 9 | 6 | – | – | – | 4 | 3 | – |
| Forschungsgruppe Wahlen | 11–13 Jan 2022 | 1,128 | 16 | 11 | 12 | 10 | 4 | – | – | – | 5 | 5 | – |
| Forschungsgruppe Wahlen | 7–9 Dec 2021 | 1,303 | 16 | 10 | 12 | 10 | 6 | – | – | – | 4 | 4 | – |

== Constituency projections ==
With the new electoral reform, constituency seats are only awarded if covered by the votes cast for the party in that state. As such, the number of constituency seats won by a party may be lower than that party's number of constituency pluralities.

=== Constituency pluralities ===
| Polling firm | Release date | Union | SPD | Grüne | AfD | Linke | FDP | BSW |
|---|---|---|---|---|---|---|---|---|
| 2025 federal election | 23 Feb 2025 | 190 | 45 | 12 | 46 | 6 | 0 | 0 |
| BUNKER | 21 Feb 2025 | 231 | 10 | 7 | 49 | 2 | 0 | 0 |
| zweitstimme.org | 21 Feb 2025 | 202 | 40 | 10 | 40 | 4 | 0 | 0 |
| election.de | 21 Feb 2025 | 204 | 34 | 11 | 45 | 5 | 0 | 0 |
| YouGov (MRP) | 20 Feb 2025 | 197 | 44 | 7 | 47 | 4 | 0 | 0 |
| INSA | 17 Feb 2025 | 245 | 9 | 12 | 31 | 2 | 0 | 0 |
| election.de | 14 Feb 2025 | 203 | 35 | 12 | 46 | 3 | 0 | 0 |
| INSA | 10 Feb 2025 | 235 | 6 | 12 | 45 | 1 | 0 | 0 |
| election.de | 7 Feb 2025 | 204 | 35 | 11 | 47 | 2 | 0 | 0 |
| YouGov (MRP) | 6 Feb 2025 | 222 | 25 | 3 | 48 | 2 | 0 | 0 |
| Wahlkreisprognose | 5 Feb 2025 | 223 | 19 | 8 | 46 | 3 | 0 | 0 |
| INSA | 3 Feb 2025 | 239 | 8 | 13 | 38 | 1 | 0 | 0 |
| election.de | 31 Jan 2025 | 203 | 35 | 12 | 47 | 2 | 0 | 0 |
| INSA | 27 Jan 2025 | 235 | 6 | 11 | 46 | 1 | 0 | 0 |
| Wahlkreisprognose | 25 Jan 2025 | 231 | 11 | 9 | 46 | 2 | 0 | 0 |
| election.de | 24 Jan 2025 | 209 | 33 | 10 | 45 | 2 | 0 | 0 |
| INSA | 20 Jan 2025 | 229 | 11 | 13 | 45 | 1 | 0 | 0 |
| election.de | 17 Jan 2025 | 212 | 30 | 10 | 45 | 2 | 0 | 0 |
| YouGov (MRP) | 16 Jan 2025 | 208 | 35 | 5 | 50 | 1 | 0 | 0 |
| INSA | 13 Jan 2025 | 246 | 4 | 9 | 40 | 0 | 0 | 0 |
| election.de | 10 Jan 2025 | 211 | 31 | 10 | 45 | 2 | 0 | 0 |
| INSA | 6 Jan 2025 | 244 | 7 | 13 | 35 | 0 | 0 | 0 |
| election.de | 3 Jan 2025 | 214 | 30 | 9 | 44 | 2 | 0 | 0 |
| INSA | 30 Dec 2024 | 249 | 8 | 6 | 34 | 2 | 0 | 0 |
| election.de | 27 Dec 2024 | 219 | 26 | 9 | 43 | 2 | 0 | 0 |
| INSA | 23 Dec 2024 | 246 | 8 | 8 | 37 | 0 | 0 | 0 |
| INSA | 16 Dec 2024 | 244 | 8 | 6 | 41 | 0 | 0 | 0 |
| election.de | 13 Dec 2024 | 223 | 26 | 9 | 39 | 2 | 0 | 0 |
| INSA | 9 Dec 2024 | 265 | 10 | 4 | 20 | 0 | 0 | 0 |
| Wahlkreisprognose | 6 Dec 2024 | 231 | 16 | 6 | 45 | 1 | 0 | 0 |
| INSA | 2 Dec 2024 | 247 | 6 | 11 | 34 | 1 | 0 | 0 |
| election.de | 29 Nov 2024 | 228 | 17 | 9 | 43 | 2 | 0 | 0 |
| INSA | 25 Nov 2024 | 272 | 5 | 3 | 19 | 0 | 0 | 0 |
| Wahlkreisprognose | 22 Nov 2024 | 244 | 6 | 5 | 43 | 1 | 0 | 0 |
| INSA | 18 Nov 2024 | 263 | 7 | 4 | 23 | 2 | 0 | 0 |
| election.de | 15 Nov 2024 | 236 | 17 | 6 | 38 | 2 | 0 | 0 |
| INSA | 11 Nov 2024 | 267 | 4 | 5 | 21 | 2 | 0 | 0 |
| INSA | 4 Nov 2024 | 258 | 5 | 2 | 34 | 0 | 0 | 0 |
| INSA | 28 Oct 2024 | 269 | 4 | 5 | 20 | 1 | 0 | 0 |
| INSA | 21 Oct 2024 | 264 | 12 | 2 | 20 | 1 | 0 | 0 |
| election.de | 15 Oct 2024 | 226 | 23 | 9 | 39 | 2 | 0 | 0 |
| INSA | 14 Oct 2024 | 253 | 7 | 3 | 35 | 1 | 0 | 0 |
| INSA | 7 Oct 2024 | 243 | 7 | 3 | 46 | 0 | 0 | 0 |
| INSA | 30 Sep 2024 | 250 | 5 | 5 | 39 | 0 | 0 | 0 |
| INSA | 23 Sep 2024 | 241 | 6 | 1 | 51 | 0 | 0 | 0 |
| INSA | 16 Sep 2024 | 274 | 2 | 1 | 22 | 0 | 0 | 0 |
| election.de | 15 Sep 2024 | 236 | 17 | 7 | 37 | 2 | 0 | 0 |
| INSA | 9 Sep 2024 | 241 | 2 | 7 | 49 | 0 | 0 | 0 |
| INSA | 2 Sep 2024 | 247 | 5 | 2 | 45 | 0 | 0 | 0 |
| INSA | 26 Aug 2024 | 265 | 4 | 7 | 23 | 0 | 0 | 0 |
| INSA | 19 Aug 2024 | 257 | 6 | 4 | 32 | 0 | 0 | 0 |
| election.de | 15 Aug 2024 | 227 | 22 | 10 | 38 | 2 | 0 | 0 |
| INSA | 12 Aug 2024 | 250 | 6 | 4 | 38 | 1 | 0 | 0 |
| INSA | 5 Aug 2024 | 254 | 8 | 4 | 33 | 0 | 0 | 0 |
| INSA | 29 Jul 2024 | 271 | 8 | 3 | 17 | 0 | 0 | 0 |
| INSA | 22 Jul 2024 | 256 | 5 | 3 | 33 | 2 | 0 | 0 |
| election.de | 15 Jul 2024 | 222 | 21 | 13 | 41 | 2 | 0 | 0 |
| INSA | 15 Jul 2024 | 258 | 4 | 7 | 29 | 1 | 0 | 0 |
| INSA | 8 Jul 2024 | 255 | 5 | 7 | 32 | 0 | 0 | 0 |
| INSA | 1 Jul 2024 | 258 | 6 | 11 | 23 | 1 | 0 | 0 |
| INSA | 24 Jun 2024 | 278 | 4 | 5 | 12 | 0 | 0 | 0 |
| INSA | 17 Jun 2024 | 258 | 7 | 5 | 29 | 0 | 0 | 0 |
| election.de | 15 Jun 2024 | 218 | 30 | 12 | 37 | 2 | 0 | 0 |
| INSA | 10 Jun 2024 | 267 | 13 | 9 | 10 | 0 | 0 | 0 |
| INSA | 3 Jun 2024 | 261 | 9 | 6 | 21 | 2 | 0 | 0 |
| INSA | 27 May 2024 | 271 | 7 | 10 | 11 | 0 | 0 | 0 |
| INSA | 21 May 2024 | 261 | 10 | 11 | 17 | 0 | 0 | 0 |
| Wahlkreisprognose | 20 May 2024 | 246 | 23 | 6 | 23 | 1 | 0 | 0 |
| election.de | 15 May 2024 | 217 | 28 | 14 | 38 | 2 | 0 | 0 |
| INSA | 13 May 2024 | 258 | 7 | 11 | 23 | 0 | 0 | 0 |
| INSA | 6 May 2024 | 250 | 6 | 10 | 31 | 2 | 0 | 0 |
| INSA | 29 Apr 2024 | 231 | 10 | 12 | 45 | 1 | 0 | 0 |
| INSA | 22 Apr 2024 | 243 | 6 | 10 | 38 | 2 | 0 | 0 |
| election.de | 15 Apr 2024 | 213 | 30 | 12 | 42 | 2 | 0 | 0 |
| INSA | 15 Apr 2024 | 255 | 9 | 13 | 22 | 0 | 0 | 0 |
| INSA | 8 Apr 2024 | 259 | 5 | 11 | 22 | 2 | 0 | 0 |
| INSA | 2 Apr 2024 | 260 | 8 | 12 | 19 | 0 | 0 | 0 |
| INSA | 25 Mar 2024 | 240 | 6 | 10 | 43 | 0 | 0 | 0 |
| Wahlkreisprognose | 21 Mar 2024 | 212 | 43 | 7 | 35 | 1 | 0 | 0 |
| INSA | 18 Mar 2024 | 257 | 10 | 9 | 22 | 1 | 0 | 0 |
| election.de | 15 Mar 2024 | 210 | 29 | 14 | 44 | 2 | 0 | 0 |
| INSA | 11 Mar 2024 | 250 | 3 | 10 | 34 | 2 | 0 | 0 |
| INSA | 4 Mar 2024 | 262 | 4 | 11 | 22 | 0 | 0 | 0 |
| INSA | 26 Feb 2024 | 261 | 6 | 13 | 19 | 0 | 0 | 0 |
| Wahlkreisprognose | 22 Feb 2024 | 235 | 8 | 6 | 48 | 0 | 0 | 2 |
| INSA | 19 Feb 2024 | 245 | 4 | 10 | 39 | 1 | 0 | 0 |
| election.de | 15 Feb 2024 | 214 | 27 | 12 | 44 | 2 | 0 | 0 |
| INSA | 12 Feb 2024 | 242 | 4 | 10 | 42 | 1 | 0 | 0 |
| INSA | 5 Feb 2024 | 240 | 9 | 11 | 39 | 0 | 0 | 0 |
| INSA | 29 Jan 2024 | 243 | 6 | 10 | 40 | 0 | 0 | 0 |
| Wahlkreisprognose | 26 Jan 2024 | 219 | 23 | 6 | 48 | 1 | 0 | 2 |
| INSA | 22 Jan 2024 | 252 | 4 | 10 | 33 | 0 | 0 | 0 |
| election.de | 15 Jan 2024 | 217 | 20 | 13 | 48 | 1 | 0 | 0 |
| INSA | 15 Jan 2024 | 243 | 4 | 8 | 43 | 1 | 0 | 0 |
| INSA | 8 Jan 2024 | 253 | 6 | 6 | 34 | 0 | 0 | 0 |
| Wahlkreisprognose | 4 Jan 2024 | 230 | 4 | 4 | 61 | 0 | 0 | 0 |
| INSA | 2 Jan 2024 | 244 | 4 | 10 | 39 | 2 | 0 | 0 |
| INSA | 27 Dec 2023 | 242 | 3 | 7 | 46 | 1 | 0 | 0 |
| INSA | 18 Dec 2023 | 244 | 5 | 10 | 39 | 1 | 0 | 0 |
| election.de | 15 Dec 2023 | 217 | 20 | 13 | 48 | 1 | 0 | 0 |
| INSA | 11 Dec 2023 | 230 | 9 | 11 | 48 | 1 | 0 | 0 |
| INSA | 4 Dec 2023 | 225 | 9 | 14 | 50 | 1 | 0 | 0 |
| Wahlkreisprognose | 27 Nov 2023 | 221 | 14 | 4 | 60 | 0 | 0 | 0 |
| INSA | 27 Nov 2023 | 243 | 6 | 10 | 39 | 1 | 0 | 0 |
| INSA | 20 Nov 2023 | 237 | 12 | 13 | 35 | 2 | 0 | 0 |
| election.de | 15 Nov 2023 | 203 | 31 | 16 | 47 | 2 | 0 | 0 |
| INSA | 13 Nov 2023 | 233 | 12 | 13 | 40 | 1 | 0 | 0 |
| INSA | 6 Nov 2023 | 231 | 14 | 14 | 38 | 2 | 0 | 0 |
| INSA | 30 Oct 2023 | 242 | 10 | 10 | 36 | 1 | 0 | 0 |
| Wahlkreisprognose | 25 Oct 2023 | 220 | 23 | 7 | 31 | 0 | 0 | 18 |
| INSA | 23 Oct 2023 | 230 | 15 | 13 | 39 | 2 | 0 | 0 |
| INSA | 16 Oct 2023 | 210 | 24 | 11 | 53 | 1 | 0 | 0 |
| election.de | 15 Oct 2023 | 190 | 43 | 17 | 47 | 2 | 0 | 0 |
| INSA | 9 Oct 2023 | 202 | 23 | 17 | 56 | 1 | 0 | 0 |
| INSA | 2 Oct 2023 | 200 | 40 | 16 | 41 | 2 | 0 | 0 |
| Wahlkreisprognose | 25 Sep 2023 | 153 | 62 | 21 | 62 | 1 | 0 | 0 |
| INSA | 25 Sep 2023 | 199 | 32 | 15 | 51 | 2 | 0 | 0 |
| INSA | 18 Sep 2023 | 198 | 31 | 20 | 48 | 2 | 0 | 0 |
| INSA | 11 Sep 2023 | 194 | 30 | 18 | 56 | 1 | 0 | 0 |
| INSA | 4 Sep 2023 | 198 | 33 | 17 | 49 | 2 | 0 | 0 |
| election.de | 1 Sep 2023 | 185 | 49 | 16 | 47 | 2 | 0 | 0 |
| INSA | 28 Aug 2023 | 194 | 30 | 23 | 50 | 2 | 0 | 0 |
| Wahlkreisprognose | 28 Aug 2023 | 151 | 78 | 12 | 57 | 1 | 0 | 0 |
| INSA | 21 Aug 2023 | 194 | 35 | 19 | 50 | 1 | 0 | 0 |
| election.de | 18 Aug 2023 | 181 | 51 | 18 | 47 | 2 | 0 | 0 |
| INSA | 14 Aug 2023 | 189 | 49 | 16 | 43 | 2 | 0 | 0 |
| INSA | 7 Aug 2023 | 200 | 53 | 17 | 29 | 0 | 0 | 0 |
| election.de | 4 Aug 2023 | 183 | 48 | 19 | 47 | 2 | 0 | 0 |
| INSA | 31 Jul 2023 | 198 | 41 | 17 | 41 | 2 | 0 | 0 |
| Wahlkreisprognose | 27 Jul 2023 | 154 | 79 | 13 | 51 | 2 | 0 | 0 |
| INSA | 24 Jul 2023 | 201 | 44 | 18 | 34 | 2 | 0 | 0 |
| election.de | 21 Jul 2023 | 188 | 46 | 16 | 46 | 3 | 0 | 0 |
| INSA | 17 Jul 2023 | 208 | 30 | 19 | 40 | 2 | 0 | 0 |
| INSA | 10 Jul 2023 | 210 | 41 | 19 | 27 | 2 | 0 | 0 |
| election.de | 7 Jul 2023 | 184 | 49 | 17 | 46 | 3 | 0 | 0 |
| INSA | 3 Jul 2023 | 190 | 46 | 23 | 38 | 2 | 0 | 0 |
| INSA | 26 Jun 2023 | 197 | 43 | 16 | 41 | 2 | 0 | 0 |
| Wahlkreisprognose | 26 Jun 2023 | 139 | 82 | 19 | 57 | 2 | 0 | 0 |
| election.de | 23 Jun 2023 | 189 | 48 | 16 | 43 | 3 | 0 | 0 |
| INSA | 19 Jun 2023 | 194 | 47 | 15 | 41 | 2 | 0 | 0 |
| INSA | 12 Jun 2023 | 215 | 47 | 15 | 20 | 2 | 0 | 0 |
| election.de | 9 Jun 2023 | 190 | 48 | 16 | 42 | 3 | 0 | 0 |
| INSA | 5 Jun 2023 | 214 | 47 | 17 | 19 | 2 | 0 | 0 |
| Wahlkreisprognose | 2 Jun 2023 | 168 | 85 | 12 | 32 | 2 | 0 | 0 |
| INSA | 30 May 2023 | 227 | 48 | 13 | 10 | 1 | 0 | 0 |
| election.de | 26 May 2023 | 196 | 49 | 16 | 35 | 3 | 0 | 0 |
| INSA | 22 May 2023 | 217 | 51 | 18 | 11 | 2 | 0 | 0 |
| INSA | 15 May 2023 | 229 | 41 | 19 | 9 | 1 | 0 | 0 |
| election.de | 12 May 2023 | 196 | 49 | 16 | 35 | 3 | 0 | 0 |
| INSA | 8 May 2023 | 225 | 42 | 20 | 10 | 2 | 0 | 0 |
| INSA | 2 May 2023 | 207 | 51 | 22 | 17 | 2 | 0 | 0 |
| Wahlkreisprognose | 30 Apr 2023 | 182 | 75 | 10 | 29 | 3 | 0 | 0 |
| election.de | 28 Apr 2023 | 196 | 49 | 18 | 33 | 3 | 0 | 0 |
| INSA | 24 Apr 2023 | 218 | 44 | 19 | 17 | 1 | 0 | 0 |
| INSA | 17 Apr 2023 | 216 | 48 | 19 | 15 | 1 | 0 | 0 |
| election.de | 16 Apr 2023 | 191 | 54 | 19 | 32 | 3 | 0 | 0 |
| INSA | 11 Apr 2023 | 212 | 46 | 23 | 17 | 1 | 0 | 0 |
| INSA | 3 Apr 2023 | 221 | 48 | 19 | 9 | 2 | 0 | 0 |
| election.de | 2 Apr 2023 | 191 | 54 | 19 | 32 | 3 | 0 | 0 |
| INSA | 27 Mar 2023 | 214 | 49 | 25 | 10 | 1 | 0 | 0 |
| Wahlkreisprognose | 27 Mar 2023 | 159 | 99 | 14 | 24 | 3 | 0 | 0 |
| INSA | 20 Mar 2023 | 224 | 54 | 17 | 3 | 1 | 0 | 0 |
| election.de | 19 Mar 2023 | 185 | 60 | 19 | 32 | 3 | 0 | 0 |
| INSA | 13 Mar 2023 | 217 | 51 | 20 | 10 | 1 | 0 | 0 |
| election.de | 10 Mar 2023 | 193 | 56 | 18 | 29 | 3 | 0 | 0 |
| INSA | 6 Mar 2023 | 233 | 37 | 18 | 10 | 1 | 0 | 0 |
| Wahlkreisprognose | 1 Mar 2023 | 192 | 73 | 11 | 22 | 1 | 0 | 0 |
| INSA | 27 Feb 2023 | 243 | 36 | 19 | 0 | 1 | 0 | 0 |
| election.de | 24 Feb 2023 | 191 | 57 | 19 | 29 | 3 | 0 | 0 |
| INSA | 20 Feb 2023 | 223 | 51 | 24 | 0 | 1 | 0 | 0 |
| INSA | 13 Feb 2023 | 228 | 45 | 23 | 1 | 2 | 0 | 0 |
| election.de | 10 Feb 2023 | 178 | 61 | 25 | 32 | 3 | 0 | 0 |
| INSA | 6 Feb 2023 | 203 | 50 | 27 | 17 | 2 | 0 | 0 |
| INSA | 30 Jan 2023 | 216 | 39 | 23 | 19 | 2 | 0 | 0 |
| election.de | 27 Jan 2023 | 181 | 59 | 27 | 29 | 3 | 0 | 0 |
| Wahlkreisprognose | 27 Jan 2023 | 134 | 109 | 23 | 30 | 3 | 0 | 0 |
| INSA | 23 Jan 2023 | 211 | 49 | 26 | 11 | 2 | 0 | 0 |
| Wahlkreisprognose | 16 Jan 2023 | 149 | 93 | 22 | 33 | 2 | 0 | 0 |
| INSA | 16 Jan 2023 | 223 | 46 | 25 | 4 | 1 | 0 | 0 |
| election.de | 13 Jan 2023 | 181 | 57 | 29 | 29 | 3 | 0 | 0 |
| INSA | 9 Jan 2023 | 212 | 45 | 31 | 9 | 2 | 0 | 0 |
| INSA | 2 Jan 2023 | 216 | 48 | 32 | 3 | 0 | 0 | 0 |
| election.de | 30 Dec 2022 | 179 | 61 | 29 | 27 | 3 | 0 | 0 |
| INSA | 19 Dec 2022 | 214 | 50 | 30 | 3 | 2 | 0 | 0 |
| election.de | 16 Dec 2022 | 182 | 54 | 31 | 29 | 3 | 0 | 0 |
| INSA | 12 Dec 2022 | 214 | 45 | 31 | 7 | 2 | 0 | 0 |
| Wahlkreisprognose | 9 Dec 2022 | 146 | 100 | 20 | 31 | 2 | 0 | 0 |
| INSA | 5 Dec 2022 | 219 | 50 | 27 | 1 | 2 | 0 | 0 |
| election.de | 2 Dec 2022 | 180 | 55 | 32 | 29 | 3 | 0 | 0 |
| INSA | 28 Nov 2022 | 212 | 52 | 33 | 0 | 2 | 0 | 0 |
| INSA | 21 Nov 2022 | 210 | 44 | 28 | 15 | 2 | 0 | 0 |
| election.de | 18 Nov 2022 | 177 | 55 | 32 | 32 | 3 | 0 | 0 |
| INSA | 14 Nov 2022 | 215 | 49 | 30 | 4 | 1 | 0 | 0 |
| Wahlkreisprognose | 8 Nov 2022 | 141 | 113 | 18 | 24 | 3 | 0 | 0 |
| INSA | 7 Nov 2022 | 205 | 50 | 33 | 9 | 2 | 0 | 0 |
| election.de | 4 Nov 2022 | 174 | 57 | 33 | 32 | 3 | 0 | 0 |
| INSA | 31 Oct 2022 | 203 | 51 | 36 | 7 | 2 | 0 | 0 |
| election.de | 21 Oct 2022 | 174 | 57 | 33 | 32 | 3 | 0 | 0 |
| Wahlkreisprognose | 21 Oct 2022 | 145 | 96 | 24 | 31 | 3 | 0 | 0 |
| INSA | 17 Oct 2022 | 219 | 40 | 36 | 3 | 1 | 0 | 0 |
| INSA | 10 Oct 2022 | 212 | 38 | 38 | 8 | 2 | 0 | 0 |
| election.de | 7 Oct 2022 | 177 | 54 | 33 | 32 | 3 | 0 | 0 |
| Wahlkreisprognose | 6 Oct 2022 | 149 | 99 | 17 | 31 | 3 | 0 | 0 |
| INSA | 4 Oct 2022 | 219 | 35 | 39 | 5 | 1 | 0 | 0 |
| INSA | 26 Sep 2022 | 209 | 30 | 39 | 19 | 2 | 0 | 0 |
| election.de | 23 Sep 2022 | 180 | 55 | 33 | 28 | 3 | 0 | 0 |
| Wahlkreisprognose | 22 Sep 2022 | 150 | 102 | 19 | 26 | 2 | 0 | 0 |
| INSA | 19 Sep 2022 | 211 | 28 | 37 | 17 | 2 | 0 | 0 |
| INSA | 12 Sep 2022 | 218 | 35 | 42 | 3 | 1 | 0 | 0 |
| Wahlkreisprognose | 11 Sep 2022 | 154 | 90 | 22 | 30 | 3 | 0 | 0 |
| election.de | 9 Sep 2022 | 177 | 59 | 38 | 23 | 2 | 0 | 0 |
| INSA | 5 Sep 2022 | 209 | 24 | 44 | 19 | 3 | 0 | 0 |
| INSA | 29 Aug 2022 | 206 | 37 | 42 | 12 | 2 | 0 | 0 |
| election.de | 26 Aug 2022 | 177 | 60 | 41 | 19 | 2 | 0 | 0 |
| INSA | 22 Aug 2022 | 214 | 28 | 45 | 10 | 2 | 0 | 0 |
| Wahlkreisprognose | 19 Aug 2022 | 140 | 73 | 55 | 30 | 1 | 0 | 0 |
| INSA | 15 Aug 2022 | 203 | 33 | 48 | 13 | 2 | 0 | 0 |
| election.de | 12 Aug 2022 | 174 | 61 | 43 | 19 | 2 | 0 | 0 |
| Wahlkreisprognose | 12 Aug 2022 | 146 | 49 | 69 | 34 | 1 | 0 | 0 |
| INSA | 8 Aug 2022 | 215 | 29 | 50 | 3 | 2 | 0 | 0 |
| INSA | 1 Aug 2022 | 196 | 32 | 51 | 18 | 2 | 0 | 0 |
| election.de | 29 Jul 2022 | 171 | 66 | 42 | 18 | 2 | 0 | 0 |
| INSA | 25 Jul 2022 | 196 | 32 | 51 | 18 | 2 | 0 | 0 |
| Wahlkreisprognose | 20 Jul 2022 | 136 | 89 | 52 | 21 | 1 | 0 | 0 |
| INSA | 18 Jul 2022 | 197 | 34 | 51 | 15 | 2 | 0 | 0 |
| election.de | 15 Jul 2022 | 174 | 69 | 39 | 15 | 2 | 0 | 0 |
| INSA | 11 Jul 2022 | 205 | 43 | 46 | 3 | 2 | 0 | 0 |
| Wahlkreisprognose | 6 Jul 2022 | 145 | 94 | 45 | 14 | 1 | 0 | 0 |
| INSA | 4 Jul 2022 | 216 | 37 | 43 | 1 | 2 | 0 | 0 |
| election.de | 1 Jul 2022 | 175 | 70 | 38 | 14 | 2 | 0 | 0 |
| INSA | 27 Jun 2022 | 212 | 42 | 45 | 0 | 0 | 0 | 0 |
| Wahlkreisprognose | 26 Jun 2022 | 144 | 98 | 37 | 18 | 2 | 0 | 0 |
| INSA | 20 Jun 2022 | 216 | 32 | 46 | 3 | 2 | 0 | 0 |
| election.de | 17 Jun 2022 | 177 | 70 | 37 | 13 | 2 | 0 | 0 |
| INSA | 13 Jun 2022 | 194 | 44 | 45 | 15 | 1 | 0 | 0 |
| Wahlkreisprognose | 8 Jun 2022 | 144 | 94 | 33 | 24 | 4 | 0 | 0 |
| INSA | 7 Jun 2022 | 203 | 43 | 47 | 5 | 1 | 0 | 0 |
| election.de | 3 Jun 2022 | 178 | 71 | 36 | 12 | 2 | 0 | 0 |
| Wahlkreisprognose | 1 Jun 2022 | 168 | 62 | 57 | 11 | 1 | 0 | 0 |
| INSA | 30 May 2022 | 204 | 49 | 44 | 0 | 2 | 0 | 0 |
| INSA | 23 May 2022 | 213 | 48 | 37 | 1 | 0 | 0 | 0 |
| election.de | 20 May 2022 | 157 | 97 | 31 | 12 | 2 | 0 | 0 |
| Wahlkreisprognose | 16 May 2022 | 162 | 89 | 34 | 13 | 1 | 0 | 0 |
| INSA | 16 May 2022 | 202 | 46 | 40 | 10 | 1 | 0 | 0 |
| Wahlkreisprognose | 9 May 2022 | 138 | 100 | 45 | 15 | 1 | 0 | 0 |
| INSA | 9 May 2022 | 209 | 52 | 33 | 3 | 2 | 0 | 0 |
| election.de | 6 May 2022 | 145 | 110 | 28 | 13 | 3 | 0 | 0 |
| INSA | 2 May 2022 | 199 | 62 | 35 | 1 | 2 | 0 | 0 |
| INSA | 25 Apr 2022 | 182 | 77 | 30 | 8 | 2 | 0 | 0 |
| Wahlkreisprognose | 24 Apr 2022 | 121 | 128 | 36 | 13 | 1 | 0 | 0 |
| election.de | 22 Apr 2022 | 144 | 115 | 24 | 13 | 3 | 0 | 0 |
| INSA | 19 Apr 2022 | 182 | 74 | 37 | 4 | 2 | 0 | 0 |
| INSA | 11 Apr 2022 | 179 | 83 | 27 | 8 | 2 | 0 | 0 |
| election.de | 8 Apr 2022 | 144 | 116 | 23 | 13 | 3 | 0 | 0 |
| Wahlkreisprognose | 5 Apr 2022 | 128 | 134 | 25 | 11 | 1 | 0 | 0 |
| INSA | 4 Apr 2022 | 184 | 86 | 27 | 1 | 1 | 0 | 0 |
| INSA | 28 Mar 2022 | 165 | 93 | 22 | 16 | 3 | 0 | 0 |
| election.de | 25 Mar 2022 | 161 | 104 | 19 | 12 | 3 | 0 | 0 |
| INSA | 21 Mar 2022 | 192 | 74 | 27 | 3 | 3 | 0 | 0 |
| Wahlkreisprognose | 21 Mar 2022 | 132 | 133 | 23 | 10 | 1 | 0 | 0 |
| election.de | 11 Mar 2022 | 150 | 115 | 19 | 12 | 3 | 0 | 0 |
| Wahlkreisprognose | 27 Feb 2022 | 128 | 131 | 22 | 16 | 2 | 0 | 0 |
| election.de | 25 Feb 2022 | 159 | 103 | 18 | 16 | 3 | 0 | 0 |
| INSA | 21 Feb 2022 | 213 | 66 | 16 | 2 | 2 | 0 | 0 |
| Wahlkreisprognose | 15 Feb 2022 | 143 | 117 | 20 | 16 | 3 | 0 | 0 |
| INSA | 14 Feb 2022 | 203 | 71 | 20 | 3 | 2 | 0 | 0 |
| election.de | 11 Feb 2022 | 158 | 103 | 18 | 17 | 3 | 0 | 0 |
| INSA | 7 Feb 2022 | 196 | 81 | 19 | 1 | 2 | 0 | 0 |
| Wahlkreisprognose | 3 Feb 2022 | 195 | 63 | 28 | 10 | 3 | 0 | 0 |
| INSA | 31 Jan 2022 | 178 | 100 | 18 | 0 | 3 | 0 | 0 |
| election.de | 28 Jan 2022 | 133 | 121 | 20 | 21 | 4 | 0 | 0 |
| INSA | 24 Jan 2022 | 146 | 129 | 19 | 2 | 3 | 0 | 0 |
| Wahlkreisprognose | 18 Jan 2022 | 124 | 139 | 17 | 16 | 3 | 0 | 0 |
| INSA | 17 Jan 2022 | 125 | 140 | 23 | 9 | 2 | 0 | 0 |
| election.de | 14 Jan 2022 | 129 | 129 | 19 | 19 | 3 | 0 | 0 |
| INSA | 10 Jan 2022 | 128 | 142 | 19 | 8 | 2 | 0 | 0 |
| INSA | 3 Jan 2022 | 118 | 137 | 19 | 23 | 2 | 0 | 0 |
| election.de | 31 Dec 2021 | 111 | 148 | 20 | 17 | 3 | 0 | 0 |
| INSA | 20 Dec 2021 | 108 | 160 | 17 | 11 | 3 | 0 | 0 |
| Wahlkreisprognose | 19 Dec 2021 | 102 | 167 | 12 | 15 | 3 | 0 | 0 |
| election.de | 17 Dec 2021 | 109 | 149 | 20 | 18 | 3 | 0 | 0 |
| INSA | 13 Dec 2021 | 114 | 153 | 17 | 12 | 3 | 0 | 0 |
| Wahlkreisprognose | 6 Dec 2021 | 75 | 176 | 24 | 21 | 3 | 0 | 0 |
| INSA | 6 Dec 2021 | 118 | 145 | 20 | 13 | 3 | 0 | 0 |
| election.de | 3 Dec 2021 | 111 | 143 | 22 | 19 | 4 | 0 | 0 |
| INSA | 29 Nov 2021 | 112 | 140 | 27 | 13 | 7 | 0 | 0 |
| Wahlkreisprognose | 24 Nov 2021 | 123 | 140 | 16 | 17 | 3 | 0 | 0 |
| INSA | 22 Nov 2021 | 122 | 147 | 15 | 12 | 3 | 0 | 0 |
| election.de | 19 Nov 2021 | 103 | 153 | 20 | 19 | 4 | 0 | 0 |
| INSA | 15 Nov 2021 | 99 | 160 | 20 | 17 | 2 | 0 | 0 |
| INSA | 8 Nov 2021 | 110 | 158 | 23 | 5 | 3 | 0 | 0 |
| Wahlkreisprognose | 7 Nov 2021 | 125 | 137 | 16 | 18 | 3 | 0 | 0 |
| election.de | 5 Nov 2021 | 101 | 156 | 20 | 18 | 4 | 0 | 0 |
| INSA | 25 Oct 2021 | 84 | 176 | 21 | 14 | 3 | 1 | 0 |
| election.de | 22 Oct 2021 | 101 | 154 | 20 | 20 | 4 | 0 | 0 |
| Wahlkreisprognose | 10 Oct 2021 | 113 | 145 | 20 | 18 | 3 | 0 | 0 |
| election.de | 8 Oct 2021 | 108 | 148 | 20 | 19 | 4 | 0 | 0 |
| INSA | 4 Oct 2021 | 94 | 163 | 21 | 19 | 2 | 0 | 0 |
| 2021 federal election | 26 Sep 2021 | 143 | 121 | 16 | 16 | 3 | 0 | 0 |

=== By probability ===
| Polling firm | Release date | Union | | | SPD | | | Grüne | | | AfD | | | Linke | | |
| Polling firm | Release date | Safe | Likely | Lean | Safe | Likely | Lean | Safe | Likely | Lean | Safe | Likely | Lean | Safe | Likely | Lean |
|---|---|---|---|---|---|---|---|---|---|---|---|---|---|---|---|---|
| 2025 federal election | 23 Feb 2025 | 190 | | | 45 | | | 12 | | | 46 | | | 6 | | |
| election.de | 21 Feb 2025 | 91 | 75 | 38 | 1 | 10 | 23 | 0 | 2 | 9 | 9 | 24 | 12 | 0 | 2 | 3 |
| election.de | 14 Feb 2025 | 91 | 77 | 35 | 1 | 10 | 24 | 1 | 1 | 10 | 10 | 23 | 13 | 0 | 1 | 2 |
| election.de | 7 Feb 2025 | 95 | 75 | 34 | 1 | 11 | 23 | 1 | 1 | 9 | 9 | 25 | 13 | 0 | 1 | 1 |
| election.de | 31 Jan 2025 | 95 | 74 | 34 | 1 | 11 | 23 | 1 | 1 | 10 | 8 | 26 | 13 | 0 | 1 | 1 |
| election.de | 24 Jan 2025 | 101 | 71 | 37 | 1 | 9 | 23 | 1 | 1 | 8 | 7 | 26 | 12 | 0 | 1 | 1 |
| election.de | 17 Jan 2025 | 111 | 67 | 34 | 1 | 7 | 22 | 1 | 1 | 8 | 8 | 25 | 12 | 0 | 1 | 1 |
| election.de | 10 Jan 2025 | 111 | 67 | 33 | 1 | 8 | 22 | 1 | 1 | 8 | 6 | 25 | 14 | 0 | 1 | 1 |
| election.de | 3 Jan 2025 | 117 | 64 | 33 | 1 | 6 | 23 | 1 | 1 | 7 | 5 | 23 | 16 | 0 | 1 | 1 |
| election.de | 27 Dec 2024 | 121 | 63 | 35 | 1 | 5 | 20 | 1 | 1 | 7 | 3 | 23 | 17 | 0 | 1 | 1 |
| election.de | 13 Dec 2024 | 124 | 61 | 38 | 1 | 5 | 20 | 1 | 2 | 6 | 1 | 19 | 19 | 0 | 1 | 1 |
| election.de | 29 Nov 2024 | 137 | 56 | 35 | 1 | 4 | 12 | 1 | 2 | 6 | 1 | 19 | 18 | 0 | 1 | 1 |
| election.de | 15 Nov 2024 | 138 | 56 | 42 | 1 | 4 | 12 | 1 | 1 | 4 | 3 | 19 | 21 | 0 | 1 | 1 |
| election.de | 15 Oct 2024 | 126 | 57 | 43 | 1 | 5 | 17 | 1 | 2 | 6 | 1 | 19 | 19 | 0 | 1 | 1 |
| election.de | 15 Sep 2024 | 137 | 56 | 43 | 1 | 4 | 12 | 1 | 1 | 5 | 1 | 19 | 17 | 0 | 1 | 1 |
| election.de | 15 Aug 2024 | 125 | 58 | 44 | 1 | 5 | 16 | 1 | 2 | 7 | 1 | 19 | 18 | 0 | 1 | 1 |
| election.de | 15 Jul 2024 | 122 | 58 | 42 | 1 | 4 | 16 | 1 | 3 | 9 | 2 | 18 | 21 | 0 | 1 | 1 |
| election.de | 15 Jun 2024 | 113 | 61 | 44 | 1 | 6 | 23 | 1 | 4 | 7 | 1 | 19 | 17 | 0 | 1 | 1 |
| election.de | 15 May 2024 | 118 | 55 | 44 | 1 | 5 | 22 | 1 | 5 | 8 | 1 | 19 | 18 | 0 | 1 | 1 |
| election.de | 15 Apr 2024 | 114 | 62 | 37 | 1 | 6 | 23 | 1 | 3 | 8 | 3 | 19 | 20 | 0 | 1 | 1 |
| election.de | 15 Mar 2024 | 111 | 61 | 38 | 1 | 5 | 23 | 1 | 4 | 9 | 5 | 22 | 17 | 0 | 1 | 1 |
| election.de | 15 Feb 2024 | 113 | 62 | 39 | 1 | 4 | 22 | 1 | 2 | 9 | 5 | 25 | 14 | 0 | 1 | 1 |
| election.de | 15 Jan 2024 | 106 | 71 | 40 | 1 | 4 | 15 | 1 | 2 | 10 | 9 | 28 | 11 | 0 | 1 | 0 |
| election.de | 15 Dec 2023 | 107 | 68 | 42 | 1 | 4 | 15 | 1 | 3 | 9 | 9 | 27 | 12 | 0 | 1 | 0 |
| election.de | 15 Nov 2023 | 94 | 72 | 37 | 1 | 6 | 24 | 1 | 4 | 11 | 11 | 25 | 11 | 0 | 1 | 1 |
| election.de | 15 Oct 2023 | 69 | 83 | 38 | 1 | 11 | 31 | 1 | 5 | 11 | 17 | 24 | 6 | 0 | 1 | 1 |
| election.de | 1 Sep 2023 | 65 | 78 | 42 | 2 | 16 | 31 | 1 | 5 | 10 | 16 | 23 | 8 | 0 | 1 | 1 |
| election.de | 18 Aug 2023 | 63 | 74 | 44 | 2 | 23 | 26 | 1 | 5 | 12 | 16 | 22 | 9 | 0 | 1 | 1 |
| election.de | 4 Aug 2023 | 66 | 74 | 43 | 2 | 17 | 29 | 1 | 7 | 11 | 16 | 22 | 9 | 0 | 1 | 1 |
| election.de | 21 Jul 2023 | 73 | 74 | 41 | 1 | 18 | 27 | 1 | 5 | 10 | 9 | 26 | 11 | 0 | 1 | 2 |
| election.de | 7 Jul 2023 | 71 | 73 | 40 | 2 | 18 | 29 | 1 | 6 | 10 | 9 | 25 | 12 | 0 | 1 | 2 |
| election.de | 23 Jun 2023 | 78 | 71 | 40 | 2 | 18 | 28 | 1 | 5 | 10 | 7 | 22 | 14 | 1 | 0 | 2 |
| election.de | 9 Jun 2023 | 85 | 70 | 35 | 1 | 16 | 31 | 1 | 5 | 10 | 2 | 24 | 16 | 1 | 0 | 2 |
| election.de | 26 May 2023 | 88 | 63 | 45 | 2 | 18 | 29 | 1 | 5 | 10 | 1 | 17 | 17 | 1 | 1 | 1 |
| election.de | 12 May 2023 | 89 | 62 | 45 | 2 | 18 | 29 | 1 | 6 | 9 | 1 | 16 | 18 | 1 | 1 | 1 |
| election.de | 28 Apr 2023 | 91 | 62 | 43 | 1 | 17 | 31 | 1 | 6 | 11 | 1 | 15 | 17 | 1 | 1 | 1 |
| election.de | 16 Apr 2023 | 85 | 64 | 42 | 2 | 18 | 34 | 1 | 7 | 11 | 1 | 14 | 17 | 1 | 1 | 1 |
| election.de | 2 Apr 2023 | 82 | 63 | 46 | 2 | 20 | 32 | 1 | 7 | 11 | 1 | 15 | 16 | 1 | 1 | 1 |
| election.de | 19 Mar 2023 | 77 | 65 | 43 | 2 | 26 | 32 | 1 | 6 | 12 | 1 | 14 | 17 | 1 | 1 | 1 |
| election.de | 10 Mar 2023 | 83 | 62 | 48 | 2 | 23 | 31 | 1 | 7 | 10 | 1 | 13 | 15 | 1 | 1 | 1 |
| election.de | 24 Feb 2023 | 80 | 63 | 48 | 2 | 25 | 30 | 1 | 7 | 11 | 1 | 13 | 15 | 1 | 1 | 1 |
| election.de | 10 Feb 2023 | 66 | 66 | 46 | 5 | 26 | 30 | 1 | 9 | 15 | 1 | 14 | 17 | 1 | 1 | 1 |
| election.de | 27 Jan 2023 | 69 | 70 | 42 | 3 | 25 | 31 | 1 | 9 | 17 | 1 | 13 | 15 | 1 | 1 | 1 |
| election.de | 13 Jan 2023 | 67 | 70 | 44 | 3 | 25 | 29 | 3 | 11 | 15 | 1 | 13 | 15 | 1 | 1 | 1 |
| election.de | 30 Dec 2022 | 67 | 68 | 44 | 4 | 24 | 33 | 3 | 11 | 15 | 1 | 13 | 13 | 1 | 1 | 1 |
| election.de | 16 Dec 2022 | 71 | 67 | 44 | 2 | 26 | 26 | 3 | 11 | 17 | 1 | 13 | 15 | 1 | 1 | 1 |
| election.de | 2 Dec 2022 | 66 | 71 | 43 | 3 | 24 | 28 | 3 | 12 | 17 | 1 | 13 | 15 | 1 | 1 | 1 |
| election.de | 18 Nov 2022 | 67 | 70 | 40 | 2 | 25 | 28 | 3 | 12 | 17 | 1 | 14 | 17 | 1 | 1 | 1 |
| election.de | 4 Nov 2022 | 61 | 71 | 42 | 4 | 24 | 29 | 3 | 13 | 17 | 1 | 14 | 17 | 1 | 1 | 1 |
| election.de | 21 Oct 2022 | 61 | 70 | 43 | 3 | 24 | 30 | 3 | 13 | 17 | 1 | 14 | 17 | 1 | 1 | 1 |
| election.de | 7 Oct 2022 | 67 | 69 | 41 | 2 | 25 | 27 | 3 | 13 | 17 | 1 | 14 | 17 | 1 | 1 | 1 |
| election.de | 23 Sep 2022 | 66 | 70 | 44 | 2 | 25 | 28 | 3 | 13 | 17 | 0 | 14 | 14 | 1 | 1 | 1 |
| election.de | 9 Sep 2022 | 58 | 71 | 48 | 4 | 21 | 34 | 4 | 14 | 20 | 0 | 10 | 13 | 1 | 1 | 0 |
| election.de | 26 Aug 2022 | 57 | 67 | 53 | 4 | 21 | 35 | 5 | 17 | 19 | 0 | 8 | 11 | 1 | 1 | 0 |
| election.de | 12 Aug 2022 | 53 | 69 | 52 | 4 | 22 | 35 | 5 | 20 | 18 | 0 | 8 | 11 | 1 | 1 | 0 |
| election.de | 29 Jul 2022 | 52 | 64 | 55 | 4 | 28 | 34 | 4 | 17 | 21 | 0 | 8 | 10 | 1 | 1 | 0 |
| election.de | 15 Jul 2022 | 52 | 64 | 58 | 4 | 33 | 32 | 4 | 15 | 20 | 0 | 5 | 10 | 1 | 0 | 1 |
| election.de | 1 Jul 2022 | 51 | 66 | 58 | 5 | 33 | 32 | 4 | 13 | 21 | 0 | 3 | 11 | 1 | 0 | 1 |
| election.de | 17 Jun 2022 | 54 | 64 | 59 | 5 | 35 | 30 | 3 | 13 | 21 | 0 | 1 | 12 | 1 | 0 | 1 |
| election.de | 3 Jun 2022 | 53 | 67 | 58 | 5 | 36 | 30 | 3 | 13 | 20 | 0 | 1 | 11 | 1 | 0 | 1 |
| election.de | 20 May 2022 | 47 | 51 | 59 | 12 | 44 | 41 | 2 | 12 | 17 | 0 | 4 | 8 | 1 | 0 | 1 |
| election.de | 6 May 2022 | 44 | 52 | 49 | 15 | 44 | 51 | 2 | 10 | 16 | 0 | 5 | 8 | 1 | 0 | 2 |
| election.de | 22 Apr 2022 | 46 | 51 | 47 | 15 | 46 | 54 | 2 | 9 | 13 | 0 | 6 | 7 | 1 | 1 | 1 |
| election.de | 8 Apr 2022 | 46 | 51 | 47 | 16 | 43 | 57 | 2 | 8 | 13 | 0 | 6 | 7 | 1 | 0 | 2 |
| election.de | 25 Mar 2022 | 51 | 51 | 59 | 12 | 46 | 46 | 2 | 4 | 13 | 0 | 5 | 7 | 1 | 1 | 1 |
| election.de | 11 Mar 2022 | 48 | 51 | 51 | 15 | 44 | 56 | 2 | 4 | 13 | 0 | 4 | 8 | 1 | 1 | 1 |
| election.de | 25 Feb 2022 | 53 | 50 | 56 | 12 | 42 | 49 | 2 | 3 | 13 | 0 | 7 | 9 | 1 | 1 | 1 |
| election.de | 11 Feb 2022 | 49 | 51 | 58 | 12 | 44 | 47 | 2 | 3 | 13 | 0 | 7 | 10 | 1 | 1 | 1 |
| election.de | 28 Jan 2022 | 41 | 50 | 42 | 22 | 42 | 57 | 2 | 6 | 12 | 0 | 9 | 12 | 1 | 1 | 2 |
| election.de | 14 Jan 2022 | 37 | 50 | 42 | 27 | 44 | 58 | 2 | 5 | 12 | 0 | 9 | 10 | 1 | 1 | 1 |
| election.de | 31 Dec 2021 | 30 | 41 | 40 | 31 | 57 | 60 | 2 | 5 | 13 | 1 | 7 | 9 | 1 | 0 | 2 |
| election.de | 17 Dec 2021 | 30 | 41 | 38 | 33 | 58 | 58 | 2 | 5 | 13 | 1 | 7 | 10 | 1 | 1 | 1 |
| election.de | 3 Dec 2021 | 27 | 42 | 42 | 28 | 55 | 60 | 2 | 8 | 12 | 1 | 10 | 8 | 1 | 1 | 2 |
| election.de | 19 Nov 2021 | 26 | 39 | 38 | 35 | 55 | 63 | 2 | 5 | 13 | 1 | 8 | 10 | 1 | 1 | 2 |
| election.de | 5 Nov 2021 | 25 | 35 | 41 | 40 | 57 | 59 | 2 | 6 | 12 | 1 | 9 | 8 | 1 | 0 | 3 |
| election.de | 22 Oct 2021 | 26 | 35 | 40 | 39 | 54 | 61 | 2 | 5 | 13 | 1 | 10 | 9 | 1 | 1 | 2 |
| election.de | 8 Oct 2021 | 28 | 42 | 38 | 30 | 59 | 59 | 2 | 5 | 13 | 1 | 9 | 9 | 1 | 1 | 2 |
| 2021 federal election | 26 Sep 2021 | 143 | | | 121 | | | 16 | | | 16 | | | 3 | | |

=== Second place ===
| Polling firm | Release date | SPD | Union | Grüne | AfD | Linke | FDP | FW |
|---|---|---|---|---|---|---|---|---|
| 2025 federal election | 23 Feb 2025 | 112 | 83 | 22 | 78 | 4 | 0 | 0 |
| election.de | 21 Feb 2025 | 115 | 72 | 36 | 73 | 3 | 0 | 0 |
| election.de | 14 Feb 2025 | 114 | 74 | 35 | 73 | 3 | 0 | 0 |
| election.de | 7 Feb 2025 | 117 | 73 | 36 | 70 | 3 | 0 | 0 |
| election.de | 31 Jan 2025 | 117 | 74 | 35 | 70 | 3 | 0 | 0 |
| election.de | 24 Jan 2025 | 116 | 71 | 37 | 72 | 3 | 0 | 0 |
| election.de | 17 Jan 2025 | 115 | 72 | 36 | 73 | 3 | 0 | 0 |
| election.de | 10 Jan 2025 | 116 | 72 | 36 | 72 | 3 | 0 | 0 |
| election.de | 3 Jan 2025 | 118 | 73 | 38 | 67 | 3 | 0 | 0 |
| election.de | 27 Dec 2024 | 121 | 71 | 39 | 66 | 2 | 0 | 0 |
| election.de | 13 Dec 2024 | 128 | 70 | 35 | 63 | 3 | 0 | 0 |
| election.de | 29 Nov 2024 | 122 | 65 | 35 | 74 | 3 | 0 | 0 |
| election.de | 15 Nov 2024 | 128 | 58 | 37 | 74 | 2 | 0 | 0 |
| election.de | 15 Oct 2024 | 127 | 68 | 33 | 69 | 2 | 0 | 0 |
| election.de | 15 Sep 2024 | 127 | 58 | 37 | 75 | 2 | 0 | 0 |
| election.de | 15 Aug 2024 | 126 | 67 | 38 | 66 | 2 | 0 | 0 |
| election.de | 15 Jul 2024 | 122 | 71 | 38 | 66 | 2 | 0 | 0 |
| election.de | 15 Jun 2024 | 123 | 74 | 41 | 59 | 2 | 0 | 0 |
| election.de | 15 May 2024 | 117 | 74 | 48 | 58 | 2 | 0 | 0 |
| election.de | 15 Apr 2024 | 118 | 79 | 39 | 62 | 1 | 0 | 0 |
| election.de | 15 Mar 2024 | 113 | 80 | 39 | 66 | 1 | 0 | 0 |
| election.de | 15 Feb 2024 | 111 | 75 | 36 | 76 | 1 | 0 | 0 |
| election.de | 15 Jan 2024 | 102 | 72 | 34 | 88 | 3 | 0 | 0 |
| election.de | 15 Dec 2023 | 105 | 72 | 37 | 83 | 2 | 0 | 0 |
| election.de | 15 Nov 2023 | 105 | 81 | 32 | 79 | 2 | 0 | 0 |
| election.de | 15 Oct 2023 | 106 | 84 | 29 | 78 | 2 | 0 | 0 |
| election.de | 1 Sep 2023 | 108 | 89 | 30 | 70 | 2 | 0 | 0 |
| election.de | 18 Aug 2023 | 112 | 91 | 30 | 64 | 2 | 0 | 0 |
| election.de | 4 Aug 2023 | 111 | 90 | 32 | 64 | 2 | 0 | 0 |
| election.de | 21 Jul 2023 | 116 | 86 | 34 | 62 | 1 | 0 | 0 |
| election.de | 7 Jul 2023 | 118 | 89 | 34 | 57 | 1 | 0 | 0 |
| election.de | 23 Jun 2023 | 120 | 85 | 37 | 56 | 1 | 0 | 0 |
| election.de | 9 Jun 2023 | 123 | 87 | 38 | 50 | 1 | 0 | 0 |
| election.de | 26 May 2023 | 130 | 82 | 44 | 42 | 1 | 0 | 0 |
| election.de | 12 May 2023 | 132 | 82 | 45 | 39 | 1 | 0 | 0 |
| election.de | 28 Apr 2023 | 135 | 83 | 43 | 37 | 1 | 0 | 0 |
| election.de | 16 Apr 2023 | 132 | 87 | 44 | 35 | 1 | 0 | 0 |
| election.de | 2 Apr 2023 | 132 | 87 | 44 | 35 | 1 | 0 | 0 |
| election.de | 19 Mar 2023 | 133 | 92 | 45 | 27 | 2 | 0 | 0 |
| election.de | 10 Mar 2023 | 136 | 86 | 47 | 28 | 2 | 0 | 0 |
| election.de | 24 Feb 2023 | 137 | 87 | 45 | 28 | 2 | 0 | 0 |
| election.de | 10 Feb 2023 | 137 | 92 | 44 | 24 | 2 | 0 | 0 |
| election.de | 27 Jan 2023 | 128 | 92 | 52 | 25 | 2 | 0 | 0 |
| election.de | 13 Jan 2023 | 127 | 91 | 55 | 24 | 2 | 0 | 0 |
| election.de | 30 Dec 2022 | 126 | 92 | 54 | 25 | 2 | 0 | 0 |
| election.de | 16 Dec 2022 | 125 | 91 | 57 | 24 | 2 | 0 | 0 |
| election.de | 2 Dec 2022 | 123 | 92 | 58 | 24 | 2 | 0 | 0 |
| election.de | 18 Nov 2022 | 121 | 95 | 59 | 22 | 2 | 0 | 0 |
| election.de | 4 Nov 2022 | 123 | 95 | 57 | 22 | 2 | 0 | 0 |
| election.de | 21 Oct 2022 | 122 | 94 | 59 | 22 | 2 | 0 | 0 |
| election.de | 7 Oct 2022 | 119 | 95 | 62 | 21 | 2 | 0 | 0 |
| election.de | 23 Sep 2022 | 118 | 92 | 64 | 23 | 2 | 0 | 0 |
| election.de | 9 Sep 2022 | 117 | 90 | 72 | 16 | 4 | 0 | 0 |
| election.de | 26 Aug 2022 | 116 | 88 | 74 | 18 | 3 | 0 | 0 |
| election.de | 12 Aug 2022 | 117 | 90 | 73 | 15 | 4 | 0 | 0 |
| election.de | 29 Jul 2022 | 122 | 89 | 71 | 13 | 4 | 0 | 0 |
| election.de | 15 Jul 2022 | 124 | 87 | 70 | 14 | 4 | 0 | 0 |
| election.de | 1 Jul 2022 | 124 | 88 | 69 | 14 | 4 | 0 | 0 |
| election.de | 17 Jun 2022 | 129 | 88 | 65 | 13 | 4 | 0 | 0 |
| election.de | 3 Jun 2022 | 132 | 87 | 65 | 11 | 4 | 0 | 0 |
| election.de | 20 May 2022 | 128 | 99 | 55 | 14 | 3 | 0 | 0 |
| election.de | 6 May 2022 | 127 | 114 | 43 | 13 | 2 | 0 | 0 |
| election.de | 22 Apr 2022 | 127 | 113 | 42 | 13 | 4 | 0 | 0 |
| election.de | 8 Apr 2022 | 127 | 114 | 42 | 13 | 3 | 0 | 0 |
| election.de | 25 Mar 2022 | 135 | 102 | 42 | 15 | 4 | 1 | 0 |
| election.de | 11 Mar 2022 | 130 | 112 | 41 | 12 | 4 | 0 | 0 |
| election.de | 25 Feb 2022 | 135 | 109 | 35 | 15 | 4 | 0 | 0 |
| election.de | 11 Feb 2022 | 137 | 103 | 38 | 16 | 4 | 0 | 0 |
| election.de | 28 Jan 2022 | 122 | 120 | 40 | 13 | 4 | 0 | 0 |
| election.de | 14 Jan 2022 | 120 | 125 | 36 | 13 | 4 | 1 | 0 |
| election.de | 31 Dec 2021 | 111 | 135 | 35 | 12 | 4 | 2 | 0 |
| election.de | 17 Dec 2021 | 110 | 135 | 34 | 14 | 4 | 2 | 0 |
| election.de | 3 Dec 2021 | 104 | 126 | 46 | 17 | 4 | 2 | 0 |
| election.de | 19 Nov 2021 | 104 | 133 | 41 | 15 | 4 | 2 | 0 |
| election.de | 5 Nov 2021 | 108 | 128 | 41 | 17 | 3 | 2 | 0 |
| election.de | 22 Oct 2021 | 103 | 130 | 40 | 19 | 5 | 2 | 0 |
| election.de | 8 Oct 2021 | 107 | 129 | 39 | 18 | 4 | 2 | 0 |
| 2021 federal election | 26 Sep 2021 | 129 | 115 | 33 | 14 | 4 | 2 | 2 |

== Bundestag projections ==
Thanks to direct votes in the 299 electoral districts and second votes or party lists, the Bundestag is formed, which from 2025 will now have 630 seats.

=== Bundestag projections ===
| Polling firm | Release date | Union | SPD | Grüne | AfD | Linke | FDP | SSW | BSW |
|---|---|---|---|---|---|---|---|---|---|
| 2025 federal election | 23 Feb 2025 | 208 | 120 | 85 | 152 | 64 | 0 | 1 | 0 |
| BUNKER | 21 Feb 2025 | 223 | 119 | 97 | 149 | 42 | 0 | 0 | 0 |
| YouGov (MRP) | 20 Feb 2025 | 220 | 115 | 94 | 145 | 55 | 0 | 1 | 0 |
