= Red–green alliance =

Political coalition between parties

In politics, a red–green alliance or red–green coalition is an alliance of "red" (often social democratic or democratic socialist) parties with "green" (often green or occasionally agrarian) parties. The alliance is often based on common left political views, especially a shared distrust of corporate or capitalist institutions. While the "red" social-democratic parties tend to focus on the effects of capitalism on the working class, the "green" environmentalist parties tend to focus on the environmental effects of capitalism.

== Red–green coalition governments ==
There have been a number of red–green governments in Europe since the 1990s.

- In Germany, a red–green coalition of the Social Democratic Party of Germany (SPD) and Alliance '90/The Greens led by Chancellor Gerhard Schröder formed the federal government from September 1998 to September 2005. This coalition, later headed by Olaf Scholz, governed Germany as a minority from November 2024 to May 2025 after the former traffic light coalition collapsed.
- In France, the 'Plural Left' coalition of the Socialist Party (PS), The Greens, French Communist Party and allies governed from 1997 until 2002. The Ayrault government which governed from May 2012 until March 2014 had ministers affiliated with the PS, Radical Party of the Left (PRG) and Europe Ecology – The Greens. The second Valls government (August 2014 to December 2016) and Cazeneuve Government (December 2016 to May 2017) were both formed of ministers from the PS, PRG and Ecologist Party.
- In Finland, Prime Minister Paavo Lipponen's first and second cabinets contained ministers from the Social Democratic Party of Finland (SDP), including Lipponen himself, and the Green League. The Green League participated in government from April 1995 until May 2002. The Rinne Cabinet formed in June 2019 is formed by the SDP as largest party, in coalition with the Green League, agrarian Centre Party, Swedish People's Party and Left Alliance.
- In Norway, the Red-Green Coalition of the Labour Party, Socialist Left Party and Centre Party governed Norway as a majority government from the 2005 general election until 2013. The 'green' element was the Centre Party, an agrarian party with green as its official color.
- In Iceland, the First and Second Cabinets of Prime Minister Jóhanna Sigurðardóttir were formed from a coalition of the Social Democratic Alliance and Left-Green Movement, governing from February 2009 to May 2013.
- In Italy, from 1996 to 2001 and 2006–2008, the Prodi I, D'Alema I, D'Alema II, Amato II and Prodi II Cabinets included the social-democratic Democrats of the Left (later to become the Democratic Party) as the largest party, with the Federation of the Greens receiving at least one ministry. However, unlike a straightforward red–green alliance, these centre-left cabinets involved a broad range of political parties that were Catholic-inspired Christian left, social-liberal and even communist backgrounds.
- In Denmark, the Thorning-Schmidt government, which governed from October 2011 to February 2014, contained the Social Democrats as the largest party in coalition with the Social Liberals and Socialist People's Party, the latter being a green party and member of the European Green Party and Global Greens.
- In Sweden, the Löfven I Cabinet established on 3 October 2014 was a minority government coalition of the Social Democratic Party and Greens. This coalition was renewed on 21 January 2019 as the Löfven II Cabinet and 9 July 2021 as the Löfven III Cabinet, before being replaced on 30 November 2021 by the Andersson Cabinet, formed by the Social Democrats alone with external support from the Greens, Left Party and agrarian Centre Party.
- In Portugal, the First António Costa Cabinet established on 26 November 2015 was a minority government led by the Socialist Party with external support from the Left Bloc, Portuguese Communist Party and The Greens, which governed until 26 October 2019.

== Red–red–green coalition ==
A red–red–green coalition or red–green–red coalition is a left-wing alliance of two "red" social democratic, democratic socialist, or socialist parties with one "green" environmentalist party. In France, Jean-Luc Mélenchon's New Ecologic and Social People's Union is an example of a left–green alliance.

== Radical red–green alliances ==
Political parties or joint electoral lists have been formed over the years, most often between socialists and left-oriented greens. Example include:

- GreenLeft of the Netherlands: a political party that began in 1989 as a political alliance comprising the Communist Party of the Netherlands, Pacifist Socialist Party and the Christian left parties Evangelical People's Party and Political Party of Radicals. The alliance had been known as Rainbow for the 1989 European elections.
- Unity List – The Red–Greens of Denmark: a political party, originally a political alliance, formed in 1989 by the Left Socialists (VS), Communist Party of Denmark (DKP) and Socialist Workers Party (SAP).
- The Nordic Green Left Alliance was a European political alliance formed by the Left Alliance (Finland), the Left-Green Movement (Iceland), the Left Party (Sweden), the Socialist Left Party (Norway) and the Socialist People's Party (Denmark). The MEPs of the NGLA sat in the European United Left–Nordic Green Left (GUE/NGL) group in the European Parliament, although the MEPs of the Socialist People's Party sat in The Greens–European Free Alliance (G/EFA) group and later joined the European Green Party.
- Left Ecology Freedom (SEL): a former political party in Italy that was initially formed as a political alliance comprising socialists, greens and social democrats. The political alliance was itself a partial successor to the short-lived The Left – The Rainbow electoral alliance which had existed in Italy from December 2007 until May 2008 comprising the Federation of the Greens (FdV), the Communist Refoundation Party, Party of Italian Communists and the Democratic Left (SD). In 2022 a new alliance, Greens and Left Alliance, composed of the successor of SEL and SD Italian Left and the successor of FdV Green Europe, was formed.
- The Coalition of the Radical Left (SYRIZA), a Greek party formed by the merger of a broad set of left-wing and eco-socialist parties, many of which were themselves formerly red–green alliances, such as the Coalition of Left, of Movements and Ecology (Synaspismos), Renewing Communist Ecological Left (AKOA), and Ecosocialists of Greece. The SYRIZA-led cabinet of Alexis Tsipras contains ones junior minister, Giannis Tsironis, from the Ecologist Greens.
- Green–Left Coalition of Croatia: formed by the We can! and Green Alternative – Sustainable Development of Croatia and by the left-wing New Left and Workers' Front (the latter left the alliance).
- Green Left of Hungary: was a merger of Alliance of Green Democrats and the Workers' Party of Hungary 2006.

== Red–green alliances with centre-left parties ==
There are also red/green political alliances and/or electoral agreements between social-democratic or liberal parties cooperate with green parties

- In Canada, the term red–green alliance has been used to describe the limited co-operation between the Liberal Party of Canada which uses red as its colour, and the Green Party of Canada, which is centre-left but not seen as being as radical as many of its overseas sister parties and take a more moderate stance than New Democratic Party.
- A red–green alliance of sorts occurred during the campaign leading up to the 2008 London mayoral election. Incumbent mayor Ken Livingstone, candidate for the Labour Party, formed an electoral pact with the Green Party mayoral candidate Siân Berry via the supplementary voting system, in which Labour voters were encouraged to place the Green candidate as their second preference, and vice versa.
- In Italy, The Olive Tree and The Union coalitions comprised the Federation of the Greens along with social-democratic, social Christian, centrist and other parties in a broad heterogenous centre-left alliance. The successor party to the Olive Tree, the Democratic Party, maintains an internal faction of greens called the Democratic Ecologists.
- In Australia, the term red–green alliance has been used to describe the co-operation between the centre-left Australian Labor Party and the Australian Greens. The Greens supported Labor to form the minority government in 2010. As the Greens is the third party in the Australian Senate which hold the balance power from crossbench, the Labor minority government needed to rely support from the Greens from 2010 to 2013.
- In New Zealand, after the 2017 general election, the Labour and the Greens signed a memorandum of understanding. This formed a loose relationship between the two parties with the goal of working together when possible to unseat the incumbent National Government. Later, the two parties also agreed to a set of budget responsibility rules, committing both parties to sustainable surpluses and capping debt, amongst other rules. Following the 2020 election, a Labour majority government was formed, supported by the Greens through a confidence and supply arrangement.
- In Hungary, Unity comprised the social democratic Hungarian Socialist Party and Democratic Coalition and the green Dialogue for Hungary alongside smaller liberal parties.
- In France, New Ecological and Social People's Union includes the left-wing La France Insoumise and French Communist Party, the centre-left Socialist Party and the green Ecologist Pole.
- In the Netherlands, GreenLeft and the Labour Party formed an alliance during the 2021-2022 cabinet formation, vowing to only join a government coalition together. In 2023, the parliamentary groups in the Senate merged following a joint election campaign. In the 2023 snap election, the two parties ran on a joint list, after members of both parties voted in favour.

== See also ==
- Blackberry coalition
- Black–green coalition
- Black-red-green coalition
- Eco-socialism
- German governing coalition
- Green ban — a strike undertaken to advance environmentalist or conservationist goals
- Green Left (disambiguation)
- Green socialist (disambiguation)
- Greens and Left Alliance
- Jamaica coalition (politics)
- Red–green–brown alliance
- Red–purple coalition
- Red–red–green coalition
- Social Movement Unionism
- Traffic light coalition
- United front
