= Green socialist =

Green socialist can refer to the movement or ideology of green socialism (see eco-socialism) or to any of the following:

- Socialist Resistance, a British ecosocialist network
- Socialist Environment and Resources Association, an organization affiliated with the UK Labour Party
- Socialist Green Unity Coalition, a former UK electoral alliance
- Third International Theory, a type of Islamic socialist government ("Jamahariya") written in Muammar Gaddafi's Green Book
