= Environmental regulation of small and medium enterprises =

Small and medium-sized enterprises (SMEs) have been identified as a problem area in the field of environmental regulation. Small and medium-sized enterprises are defined by the European Commission as having fewer than 250 employees, independent (with no shareholder having over a 25% stake in the business) and with an annual turnover of no more than €50 million or annual balance sheet of €43 million.

While the individual environmental impacts of SMEs are generally small in comparison to those of large corporations, the cumulative environmental impacts of the sector are large. They also pose particular problems for environmental governance, showing little receptiveness to new environment policy instruments (NEPIs) such as market-based instruments, voluntary agreements and informational devices.

== Problem areas ==
There are approximately 4.7 million businesses in the UK of which 99.7% are SMEs. The large size of the sector lends itself to the idea that environmental impacts are cumulatively large. Whilst there has been limited research into the quantitative impacts of SMEs, the Marshall Report estimates that 60% of total carbon emissions in the UK are attributable to SMEs. SMEs are also responsible for around 60% of commercial waste and 43% of all serious industrial pollution incidents. The perception of SME environmental behaviour is generally poor. Failure to pursue eco-efficient measures has often been attributed to low levels of awareness and lack of resources. Comparable evidence from outside the United Kingdom shows a similar pattern. It is theorised that as the majority of SMEs serve local markets they are less likely to be exposed to international pressures or incentives, including those likely to promote eco-innovation. It has also been suggested that civil society has less concern for smaller firms’ actions, being more likely to direct their concern towards larger organisations which are seen to have the biggest impact.

Whilst the 1980s and 1990s saw a shift in the perceived relationship between the environment and business practice it has only translated into actions for prominently large firms. This change in environmental business ethics stems mainly from ideas of ‘ecological modernisation', a school of thought advanced most notably by German scholars Joseph Huber and Martin Janicke. They challenged Max Weber’s theory of bureaucratic rationality. A theory which positions government as best placed to resolve environmental problems. Instead, the discourse of ecological modernisation claims that sufficient innovative capacity will come only from industry itself as it has the expertise and means to do so. This is posited with the idea of ‘steering’ industry onto more environmentally beneficial pathways through financial incentives.

This shift is clearly visible in the 1980 World Conservation Strategy which pushes environmental actions from reactive to anticipatory. The shift towards thinking in terms of ‘ecological modernisation’ has also involved a movement to ‘smart’ regulatory instruments involving more reflexive forms of law (law which pushes businesses to reflect on and regulate their own practices) such as Environmental Management Systems, Environmental Reporting and Disclosure Strategies, Market-Based Instruments and the social license. The latter of these being important in Corporate Social Responsibility.

Whilst ‘smart’ regulation is a promising concept, SMEs have been slow on the uptake and have generally been observed to retain a reactive approach to positive environmental actions. Research has often suggested that a more comprehensive approach will be needed to improve environmental performance in the SME sector, these are based on three distinct theoretical perspectives;

- The strategic perspective highlights the importance of the way in which environmental issues are communicated and perceived by actors involved with SME governance.
- The network perspective advances improving the environment from which SMEs obtain knowledge relating to new technological innovations and;
- The internal competence perspective underlines a need to build the receptive capacity of SMEs in adjusting to new technological innovation.

== Structural issues ==
It has been suggested that there is not yet a substantial structure in the UK which forces environmental matters onto the business agendas of UK SMEs. The choice of policy instruments in the UK has tended not to acknowledge the structural differences between large firms and SMEs. For example, the EU White Paper has often promoted a sectoral and ‘one-size-fits-all’ approach to addressing the environmental impacts of business activities. Although acknowledging structural differences between industries is important, this distinction alone may undermine the recognition of important differences in large corporations and SMEs that may affect the way in which environmental issues are perceived or acted upon. With regard to policy action, the White Paper has influenced the creation of ‘sectoral sustainability strategies’, voluntary conglomerates of firm representatives from specific industrial sectors. Such associations have been criticised for being unrepresentative of the interests due to the unequal power relations between large and small firms.

SMEs are also perceived to often lack characteristics that would otherwise enable them to engage effectively with the sustainable development agenda, barriers for effective engagement being both internal and external to the firm. It is thought that a lack of institutional enfranchisement of SMEs in the UK is also a key factor in understanding why environmental policies may be ineffective at encouraging proactive environmental performance within smaller firms.

== Corporate social responsibility ==
Whilst CSR strategies have been intensively adopted by large and publicly visible corporations, the effectiveness of this type of social regulation with SMEs remains questionable. This is partly due to their size, as their smaller-scale activities are less visible within society. It is thought that many larger firms develop CSR strategies voluntarily to avoid disclosure for bad practice and to maintain and develop a shareholder base. Small firms however are not subject to the same incentives for practicing CSR. This is because they are defined by a limited shareholder base and are unlikely to exhibit environmental and social bad practice on a scale worthy of media attention. These ideas are exemplified in a study by Lynch-Wood and Williamson which has suggested that SME environmental practice is driven by ‘business performance’ and ‘regulation’, rather than the ‘business case’ (i.e. maintaining and improving shareholder base) which CSR practice stems from. It is also apparent that smaller firms may not have the available financial resources for pursuing costly CSR strategies (CSR programmes typically involving funding community projects).

Voluntary measures as a whole have been problematized by some scholars with a suggestion that environmental practice in SMEs is often constrained by free-market decision-making frames that encourage profitability to the detriment of beyond compliance social and environmental behaviour.

== Environmental management systems ==
Environmental Management Systems (EMS) such as ISO 14001 and EMAS seek to provide all businesses (regardless of size and industry) with the means to develop systematic approaches to improving environmental performance. ISO 14001 was purportedly written with the chipshop owner in mind so as to defend its use across the entire EU business community. Whilst EMS is supposed to be suited for SME use, rates of uptake have been marginal. It is estimated that in 1999 only 24% of UK businesses registered with EMAS were SMEs, whilst no figures are available for ISO 14001 based on company size

The most promoted incentive for businesses implementing EMS is generally cost-savings. A pan-EU survey of businesses using EMAS identified that cost-savings were indeed the biggest perceived benefit to arise from implementation across enterprises in Europe however SMEs placed this second claiming EMAS mainly benefited corporate image.

Whilst ISO 14001 was designed with the chip shop man in mind, the requirements of EMS should not be underestimated. The ISO 14001 follows a basic structure requiring business to define an environmental policy, environmental aspects register (detailing applicable environmental legislation) and annually reviewed objectives and targets (in reference to environmental aspects). Without support or training, these elements can be difficult to understand. ISO 14001 requires internal auditing (on an annual basis) meaning extra constraints such as time dedicated to staff training (as it cannot be undertaken by the individual responsible for overseeing the management system). Certification and Validation are expensive and SMEs especially may require support from consultants, further adding to costs.

Whilst these financial burdens may have minimal impact on larger corporations, for smaller firms the costs of implementation and upkeep may out-weigh the cost savings achieved through the EMS. If SMEs are to pursue EMS it is likely to be a result of supply chain pressure rather than ideas of financial gain.

== Environmental innovation ==
The diffusion of cleaner technologies and self-regulation (i.e. through the use of EMS) has been limited in the SME sector. This is thought to offer a key challenge to policy makers as SMEs lack sufficient network relations. A lack of resources often entails that the firm will only participate in limited network activities for example with only one prominent customer or supplier. This limited network activity limits the scope for transferring information on technological innovations.

== Changing legislation ==
More recently structural problems regarding SME governance have been recognised by the European Union. In June 2008 the Small Business Act (SBA) for Europe was adopted. The act seeks to promote a greater range of incentives for SME good practice with the aim of bringing the sector in line with the sustainable development agenda.

Principle 9 ‘Turning environmental challenges into opportunities’ is seen as pivotal in steering SMEs onto more environmentally active pathways. In line with this principle several member states have provided energy efficiency funding either through subsidies or encouraging loan conditions as well as varying degrees of cost-free consultancy support to SMEs.

The SBA review invites member states to use an "SME test" to assess whether disproportionate effects will be realised in relation to enterprise size. It has also been recognised that greater regulatory incentives need to be given for SMEs to adopt ISO 14001 or EMAS. The review paper sets out to provide greater networking support to SMEs. It is theorised that by facilitating the use of networks it will be possible for information resources regarding eco-innovations to be transferred across a broader array of firms, including those from the SME sector. The SBA review also recognises that ‘whilst SMEs have some market incentives to optimise their resource use, in many cases the market signals are not easy to identify’ they also state that ‘SMEs face challenges of limited information, time and human and financial resources’. It has been suggested that to overcome these challenges it will be necessary to develop incentives such as financial assistance. It is said that the Enterprise Europe Network will provide incentives for good environmental practice by offering assistance to SMEs marketing products and services resulting from best practice, particularly those adopting low carbon technologies.

Although the aims of the SBA for Europe are seen as necessary for catalysing positive change in the environmental business performance of the SME sector it is not legally binding.
