= Roland Daniels =

German physician

Roland Daniels (20 January 1819 – 29 August 1855) was a German medical doctor, socialist, writer, and a friend of Karl Marx. He is considered to be responsible for several of Marx's ideas on ecology including metabolic rift, a term coined by John Bellamy Foster in his book Marx's Ecology. He was incarcerated during the Cologne Communist Trial which led to tuberculosis and premature death.

Daniels was born in Engelsdorf near Cologne and trained as a physician. In 1844 he met Karl Marx in Paris and became deeply influenced, joining the Communist League in Cologne. He was arrested during the Cologne Communist Trial in June 1851 but was acquitted later. The incarceration however led to a tuberculosis infection from which he died. He was the author of a manuscript Mikrokosmos on anthropology in which he tried to connect Marx's dialectical materialism with natural science, particularly principles from contemporary ecology. Daniels was familiar with the work of Justus von Liebig and developed the concept of metabolism (Stoffwechsel) and examined how humans gathered and returned energy and material from the environment which he termed as "social metabolism".
