= European Recovery Plan =

European Recovery Plan may refer to:

- European Recovery Program (informally the Marshall Plan) in 1947
- European Economic Recovery Plan in 2008

== See also ==
- Recovery plan (disambiguation)
