= Fiat money =

Currency not backed by any commodity

Yuan dynasty banknotes are a medieval form of fiat money. This banknote has a value of èr guàn (貳貫) printed on it, where 貳 is the version of the word "two" used in financial writing, and 貫 is a unit of measure called a string of cash coins. Directly under the words "貳貫" are a picture of 2 circular strings of cash coins, visually depicting the physical currency value represented by this banknote.

Fiat money or fiat currency is a type of government-issued currency, generally created by a central bank, authorized by government regulation to be legal tender but not backed by a precious metal, such as gold or silver, nor by any other tangible asset or commodity. Since the end of the Bretton Woods system in 1976 by the Jamaica Accords, all the major government currencies in the world are fiat money.

Fiat money generally does not have intrinsic value nor a use value. It has value only because the individuals who use it (as a unit of account or, in the case of currency, a medium of exchange) agree on its value. They trust that it will be accepted by merchants and other people as a means of payment for liabilities. Austrian, monetarist, neoclassical and New Keynesian economists argue that an increase in the fiat money supply causes inflation while Keynesian, Post-Keynesian and modern monetary theory economists argue that an increase in money supply is insufficient to cause inflation.

Fiat money is an alternative to commodity money (which is a currency that has intrinsic value because it contains, for example, a precious metal such as gold or silver which is embedded in the coin). Fiat also differs from representative money (which is money that has intrinsic value because it is backed by and can be converted into a precious metal or another commodity). Fiat money can look similar to representative money (such as paper bills), but the former has no backing, while the latter represents a claim on a commodity or a tradable investment, and can be redeemed to a greater or lesser extent. (Note: See Monetary economics for further discussion.)

Government-issued fiat money banknotes were used first during the 13th century in China. Fiat money started to predominate during the 20th century. Since US President Richard Nixon's decision to suspend US dollar convertibility to gold in 1971, a system of national fiat currencies has been used globally.

Fiat money can be:

- Money declared by a person, institution or government to be legal tender, meaning that it must be accepted in payment of a debt in specific circumstances.
- State-issued money which is neither convertible through a central bank to anything else nor fixed in value in terms of any objective standard.
- Money used because of government decree.
- An otherwise non-valuable object that serves as a medium of exchange (also known as fiduciary money).

The term fiat derives from Latin for "let [it] be done", (Note: Fīat is the third-person singular present active subjunctive of fiō ("I become", "I am made").) used in the sense of an order, decree or resolution.

== Treatment in economics ==
Most of the money in the economy is created, not by printing presses at the central bank, but by banks when they provide loans. [...] This also means as you pay off the loan, the electronic money your bank created is 'deleted' – it no longer exists. So essentially, banks create money, not wealth.

— Bank of England

In monetary economics, fiat money is an intrinsically valueless object or record that is accepted widely as a means of payment. Accordingly, the value of fiat money is greater than the value of its metal or paper content.

One justification for fiat money comes from a micro-founded model. In most economic models, agents are intrinsically happier when they have more money. In a model by Lagos and Wright, fiat money does not have an intrinsic worth but agents get more of the goods they want when they trade assuming fiat money is valuable. Fiat money's value is created internally by the community and, at equilibrium, makes otherwise infeasible trades possible.

Objections to fiat money can be traced back to at least the 1700s. In 1787, George Washington wrote to Jabez Bowen, regarding the Rhode Island pound: "Paper money has had the effect in your State that it ever will have, to ruin commerce—oppress the honest, and open a door to every species of fraud and injustice."

In the Grundrisse (1857–58), Karl Marx considered the modern economic ramifications of a historical switch to fiat money from the gold or silver-commodity. Marx writes:

Suppose that the Bank of France did not rest on a metallic base, and that other countries were willing to accept the French currency or its capital in any form, not only in the specific form of the precious metals. Would the bank not have been equally forced to raise the terms of its discounting precisely at the moment when its "public" clamoured most eagerly for its services? The notes with which it discounts the bills of exchange of this public are at present nothing more than drafts on gold and silver. In our hypothetical case, they would be drafts on the nation's stock of products and on its directly employable labour force: the former is limited, the latter can be increased only within very positive limits, and in certain amounts of time. The printing press, on the other hand, is inexhaustible and works like a stroke of magic.

Commenting on the passage, Marxist economist and geographer David Harvey writes that "[t]he consequence, as Marx saw it, would be that "the directly exchangeable wealth of the nation" would be 'absolutely diminished' alongside of 'an unlimited increase of bank drafts' (i.e., accelerating indebtedness) with the direct consequence of 'increase in the price of products, raw materials and labour' (inflation) alongside a 'decrease in price of bank drafts' (ever-falling rates of interest)." Harvey notes the accuracy of the modern economy in this way, save for "...the rising prices of labor and means of production (low inflation except for assets such as stocks and shares, land and property and resources such as water rights)." The latter point can be explained by the private exportation of debt, labour, and figurative and/or literal waste to the global periphery, a concept related to metabolic and carbon rift.

Another mathematical model that explains the value of fiat money comes from game theory. In a game where agents produce and trade objects, there can be multiple Nash equilibria where agents settle on stable behavior. In a model by Kiyotaki and Wright, an object with no intrinsic worth can have value during trade in one (or more) of the Nash equilibria.

== History ==
=== China ===
China has a long history with paper money, beginning in the 7th century CE. During the 11th century, the government established a monopoly on its issuance, and about the end of the 12th century, convertibility was suspended. The use of such money became widespread during the subsequent Yuan and Ming dynasties.

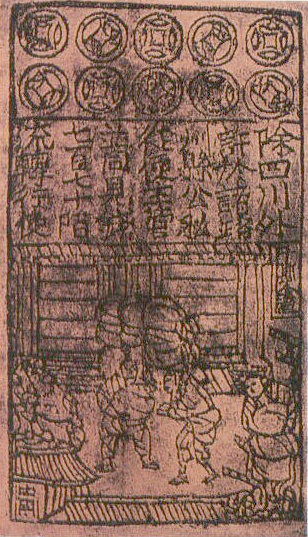
Song dynasty Jiaozi, the world's earliest paper money

The Song dynasty in China was the first to issue paper money, jiaozi, about the 10th century CE. Although the notes were valued at a certain exchange rate for gold, silver, or silk, conversion was never allowed in practice. The notes were initially to be redeemed after three years' service, to be replaced by new notes for a 3% service charge, but, as more of them were printed without notes being retired, inflation became evident. The government made several attempts to maintain the value of the paper money by demanding taxes partly in currency and making other laws, but the damage had been done, and the notes became disfavored.

The succeeding Yuan dynasty was the first dynasty of China to use paper currency as the predominant circulating medium. The founder of the Yuan dynasty, Kublai Khan, issued paper money known as Jiaochao during his reign. The original notes during the Yuan dynasty were restricted in area and duration as in the Song dynasty.

During the 13th century, Marco Polo described the fiat money of the Yuan dynasty in his book The Travels of Marco Polo:

All these pieces of paper are issued with as much solemnity and authority as if they were of pure gold or silver... and indeed everybody takes them readily, for wheresoever a person may go throughout the Great Kaan's dominions he shall find these pieces of paper current, and shall be able to transact all sales and purchases of goods by means of them just as well as if they were coins of pure gold.

— Marco Polo, The Travels of Marco Polo

=== Europe ===
According to a travelogue of a visit to Prague in 960 by Ibrahim ibn Yaqub, small pieces of cloth were used as a means of trade, with these cloths having a set exchange rate versus silver.

Around 1150, the Knights Templar would issue notes to pilgrims. Pilgrims would deposit valuables with a local Templar preceptory before embarking for the Holy Land and receive a document indicating the value of their deposit. They would then use that document upon arrival in the Holy Land to receive funds from the treasury of equal value.

Washington Irving records an emergency use of paper money by the Spanish for a siege during the Conquest of Granada (1482–1492). In 1661, Johan Palmstruch issued the first regular paper money in the West, by royal charter from the Kingdom of Sweden, through a new institution, the Bank of Stockholm. While this private paper currency was largely a failure, the Swedish parliament eventually assumed control of the issue of paper money in the country. By 1745, its paper money was inconvertible to specie, but acceptance was mandated by the government. This fiat currency depreciated so rapidly that by 1776 it was returned to a silver standard. Fiat money also has other beginnings in 17th-century Europe, having been introduced by the Bank of Amsterdam in 1683.

=== New France 1685–1770 ===
In 17th century New France, now part of Canada, the universally accepted medium of exchange was the beaver pelt. As the colony expanded, coins from France came to be used widely, but there was usually a shortage of French coins. In 1685, the colonial authorities in New France found themselves seriously short of money. A military expedition against the Iroquois had gone badly and tax revenues were down, reducing government money reserves. Typically, when short of funds, the government would simply delay paying merchants for purchases, but it was not safe to delay payment to soldiers due to the risk of mutiny.

Jacques de Meulles, the Intendant of Finance, conceived an ingenious ad hoc solution – the temporary issuance of paper money to pay the soldiers, in the form of playing cards. He confiscated all the playing cards in the colony, had them cut into pieces, wrote denominations on the pieces, signed them, and issued them to the soldiers as pay in lieu of gold and silver. Because of the chronic shortages of money of all types in the colonies, these cards were accepted readily by merchants and the public and circulated freely at face value. It was intended to be purely a temporary expedient, and it was not until years later that its role as a medium of exchange was recognized. The first issue of playing card money occurred during June 1685 and was redeemed three months later. However, the shortages of coinage reoccurred and more issues of card money were made during subsequent years. Because of their wide acceptance as money and the general shortage of money in the colony, many of the playing cards were not redeemed but continued to circulate, acting as a useful substitute for scarce gold and silver coins from France. Eventually, the Governor of New France acknowledged their useful role as a circulating medium of exchange.

As the finances of the French government deteriorated because of European wars, it reduced its financial assistance to its colonies, so the colonial authorities in Canada relied more and more on card money. By 1757, the government had discontinued all payments in coin and payments were made in paper instead. In an application of Gresham's Law – bad money drives out good – people hoarded gold and silver, and used paper money instead. The costs of the Seven Years' War resulted in rapid inflation in New France. After the British conquest in 1760, the paper money became almost worthless, but business did not end because gold and silver that had been hoarded came back into circulation. By the Treaty of Paris (1763), the French government agreed to convert the outstanding card money into debentures, but with the French government essentially bankrupt, these bonds were defaulted and by 1771 they were worthless.

The Royal Canadian Mint still issues Playing Card Money in commemoration of its history, but now in 92.5% silver form with gold plate on the edge. It therefore has an intrinsic value which considerably exceeds its fiat value. The Bank of Canada and Canadian economists often use this early form of paper currency to illustrate the true nature of money for Canadians.

=== 18th and 19th centuries ===
Adoption of 'Gold Standard' (Paper currency convertible into gold)
Country	Year
United Kingdom	1821
Germany	1871
Sweden	1873
United States (de facto)	1873
France	1874
Belgium	1874
Italy	1874
Switzerland	1874
Netherlands	1875
Austria-Hungary	1892
Japan	1897
Russia	1898
United States (de jure)	1900

An early form of fiat currency in the American Colonies was "bills of credit". Provincial governments produced notes which were fiat currency, with the promise to allow holders to pay taxes with those notes. The notes were issued to pay current obligations and could be used for taxes levied at a later time. Since the notes were denominated in the local unit of account, they were circulated from person to person in non-tax transactions. These types of notes were issued particularly in Pennsylvania, Virginia and Massachusetts. Such money was sold at a discount to silver. The government would then spend them, and they would expire at a fixed later date.

Bills of credit have generated some controversy from their inception. Those who have wanted to emphasize the dangers of inflation have emphasized those colonies where the bills of credit depreciated most dramatically: New England and the Carolinas. Those who wanted to defend the use of bills of credit in the colonies have emphasized the middle colonies, where inflation was practically nonexistent.

Colonial powers intentionally introduced fiat currencies backed by taxes (e.g., hut taxes or poll taxes) to mobilise economic resources in their new possessions, at least as a transitional arrangement. The purpose of such taxes was later served by property taxes. The repeated cycle of deflationary hard money, followed by inflationary paper money continued through much of the 18th and 19th centuries. Often nations would have dual currencies, with paper trading at some discount to money which represented specie.

Examples are

- the "Continental" bills issued by the U.S. Congress before the United States Constitution;
- paper versus gold ducats in Napoleonic era Vienna, where paper often traded at 100:1 against gold;
- the South Sea Bubble, which produced bank notes not representing sufficient reserves; and
- the Mississippi Company scheme of John Law.

During the American Civil War, the Federal Government issued United States Notes, a form of paper fiat currency known popularly as 'greenbacks'. Their issue was limited by Congress at slightly more than $340 million. During the 1870s, withdrawal of the notes from circulation was opposed by the United States Greenback Party. It was termed 'fiat money' in an 1878 party convention.

=== 20th century ===
Immediately after World War I, governments and banks generally still promised to convert notes and coins into their nominal commodity (redemption by specie, typically gold) on demand. However, the costs of the war and the required repairs and economic growth based on subsequent government borrowing made governments suspend redemption by specie. Some governments were wary of avoiding sovereign default but did not realise the consequences of paying debts by consigning newly printed cash not associated with a metal standard to their creditors, which resulted in hyperinflation: for example the hyperinflation in the Weimar Republic.

From 1944 to 1971, the Bretton Woods agreement fixed the value of 35 United States dollars to one troy ounce of gold. Other currencies were calibrated with the U.S. dollar at fixed rates: for example the pound sterling traded for many years within a narrow band centred on US$2.80. The U.S. promised to redeem dollars with gold transferred to other national banks. Trade imbalances were corrected by gold reserve exchanges or by loans from the International Monetary Fund (IMF).

The Bretton Woods system was ended by what became known as the Nixon shock, a series of economic changes by United States President Richard Nixon in 1971. These changes included unilaterally canceling the direct convertibility of the United States dollar to gold. Since then, a system of national fiat monies has been used globally, with variable exchange rates between the major currencies.

=== Precious metal coinage ===
During the 1960s, production of silver coins for circulation ceased when the face value of the coin was less than the cost of the precious metal it contained (whereas it had been greater historically). In the United States, the Coinage Act of 1965 eliminated silver from circulating dimes and quarter dollars, and most other countries did the same with their coins. The Canadian penny, which was mostly copper until 1996, was removed from circulation altogether during the autumn of 2012 due to the cost of production relative to face value. On February 9, 2025, United States President Donald Trump instructed Scott Bessent, the secretary of the Treasury, to halt production of the penny, citing its high production costs.

In 2007, the Royal Canadian Mint produced a million dollar gold bullion coin and sold five of them. In 2015, the gold in the coins was worth more than 3.5 times the face value.

== Money creation and regulation ==
A central bank introduces new money into an economy by purchasing financial assets or lending money to financial institutions. Commercial banks then redeploy or repurpose this base money by credit creation through fractional reserve banking, which expands the total supply of "broad money" (cash plus demand deposits).

In modern economies, relatively little of the supply of broad money is physical currency. For example, in December 2010 in the U.S., of the $8,853.4 billion of broad money supply (M2), only $915.7 billion (about 10%) consisted of physical coins and paper money. The manufacturing of new physical money is usually the responsibility of the national bank, or sometimes, the government's treasury.

The Bank for International Settlements historically published detailed reviews of payment system developments in the Committee on Payments and Market Infrastructures (CPMI) countries through annual "red book" reports. Since November 2023, this data is now published through the BIS Data Portal rather than as a PDF report. The CPMI releases updated statistics annually in March, accompanied by a brief analytical report on payment trends. The value of physical currency as a percentage of GDP ranges from 19.4% in Japan to 1.7% in Sweden, with an overall average of 8.9% (7.9% for the US).

Banknotes and coins in circulation, end 2024
Country or region	M0 Supply, in Billions	Growth since 2014	Per capita
United States	$2,322.9	63.0%	$6,976
Eurozone	$1,800	48.8%	$5,202
China	$1,800	84.2%	$1,276
Japan	$874	2.0%	$7,048
India	$562	123.9%	$394
Russia	$180	53.8%	$1,250
United Kingdom	$109	5.8%	$1,603
Switzerland	$110	44.7%	$12,222
Korea	$85	14.9%	$1,635
Mexico	$100	38.9%	$775
Canada	$90.98	54.2%	$2,275
Brazil	$73.4	26.6%	$343
Australia	$70	27.3%	$2,692
Saudi Arabia	$70	32.1%	$1,944
Hong Kong SAR	$55	14.6%	$7,333
Turkey	$43	19.4%	$506
Singapore	$36	33.3%	$6,102
Sweden	$12	33.3%	$1,143
South Africa	$10	66.7%	$164
Total/Average	$8,403.3	85.3%	$3,204

Data on currency in circulation (M0) obtained from central bank reports and statistical releases, with foreign currency amounts converted to US dollars using Federal Reserve exchange rates as of December 31, 2024. (Note: Attributed to multiple sources:)

== Inflation ==
The adoption of fiat currency by many countries, from the 18th century onwards, made much larger variations in the supply of money possible. Since then, huge increases in the supply of paper money have occurred in a number of countries.

Austrian, monetarist, neoclassical and New Keynesian economists hold that increase in money supply causes inflation while Keynesian, Post-Keynesian and modern monetary theory economists argue that increase in money supply is insufficient to cause inflation, if it doesn't result in increased aggregate demand or if it increases aggregate demand, but not enough to fill the output gap - the potential of the economy to produce goods and services.

The channel through which money supply is increased affects its distribution between firms and households, which in turn determines whether aggregate demand is increased. For example wealthy households that save most of their income contribute much less of this income to aggregate demand than poor households that spend most of it. As a result, if money supply takes the form of government bond coupon payments, these payments are received by wealthy households or by banks and firms that are in turn owned by mostly wealthy households, resulting in increased savings and increased prices of assets like real estate, but a negligible effect on aggregate demand.

Presently, most economists favor a small and steady rate of inflation. Small (as opposed to zero or negative) inflation reduces the severity of economic recessions by enabling the labor market to adjust more quickly to a recession, and reduces the risk that a liquidity trap (a reluctance to lend money due to low rates of interest) prevents monetary policy from stabilizing the economy. However, low interest rates don't always cause nominal increases of price. Money supply growth may instead result in stable prices at a time in which they would otherwise be decreasing. Some economists maintain that with the conditions of a liquidity trap, large monetary injections are like "pushing on a string".

The task of keeping the rate of inflation small and stable is usually given to monetary authorities. Generally, these monetary authorities are the national banks that control monetary policy by the setting of interest rates, by open market operations, and by the setting of banking reserve requirements.

== Loss of backing ==
Austrian, monetarist and New Classical economists generally argue that fiat-money systems are vulnerable to severe inflation when fiscal discipline collapses and monetary authorities are forced to accommodate deficits, often citing historical hyperinflations such as in Weimar Germany, Zimbabwe, and Venezuela. These schools emphasize excessive money growth, loss of credibility, and fiscal dominance as central mechanisms. In contrast, Modern Monetary Theory economists argue that all cases of hyperinflation were preceded by a prior collapse of real productive capacity due to war, land reform or external constraints and that money creation alone has historically not been sufficient to cause hyperinflation, though it may exacerbate inflation once real productive limits are breached.

== See also ==
- Cryptocurrency – Digital asset using a distributed ledger
- Debasement – Practice of lowering the intrinsic value of coins
- Debt based monetary system - monetary system where commercial banks create the new money as debt
- Fractional-reserve banking – Banking system where institutions hold only a fraction of deposits as reserves
- Hard currency – Reliable and stable globally-traded currency
- Demurrage currency – Money designed to lose purchasing power
- Inflation hedge – Investment intended to protect an investor against inflation or hedge
- Modern Monetary Theory – Macroeconomic theory
- Money creation – Process by which the money supply of an economic region is increased
- Money supply – Total value of money available in an economy at a specific point in time
- Network effect – Increasing value with increasing participation
- Scrip – Any substitute for legal tender or currency
  - Company scrip – Scrip issued by a company to pay its employees, can only be spent in the company store
- Seigniorage – Profit from minting money
- Silver coin – Form of coinage
- Silver standard – Monetary system
