= Grzegorz Mikusiński =

Ecology scientist

Grzegorz Mikusiński (born 18 July 1960) is a professor and scientist affiliated with the Swedish University of Agricultural Sciences (SLU). His research focus is on the conservation and management of forest biodiversity with particular emphasis on forest birds. He is also interested in broader environmental topics such as disturbance ecology, ecosystem services, sustainable development and human-nature interactions.

Mikusiński has published more than 100 peer-reviewed scientific papers and was the main editor of a major book on ecology and conservation of forest birds (Cambridge University Press, 2018). He has served as associate editor of the journal Biodiversity and Conservation.

In addition to his research done in Sweden, Poland, Germany, and Nepal, he is also an academic teacher to undergraduate and graduate students. Moreover, he has been acting as a supervisor of 14 Ph.D. students.

Mikusiński held guest fellowships at the Chair of Wildlife Ecology and Management, University of Freiburg, Germany in years 2017-2026
