= Marx's Ecology =

2000 book by John Bellamy Foster

- Author: John Bellamy Foster
- Language: English
- Genre: Ecology
- Publisher: Monthly Review Press
- Publication date: 2000
- Publication place: United States of America
- Pages: 310
- ISBN: 978-1583670125

Marx's Ecology (Full title: Marx's Ecology: Materialism and Nature) is a 2000 non-fiction book by American academic John Bellamy Foster. In it, Foster investigates the origins of materialism leading up to the works of the political theorist, economist, journalist, and revolutionary socialist, Karl Marx. In doing this, the argument is presented that far from the typical understanding of Marx as a promethean, he was strongly concerned with the environmental issues of his time, and many of his ideas had ecological components.

== Background ==
While Foster's initial research centered on Marxian political economies and theories of capitalist development, in the late 1980s, he shifted towards issues of ecology.

He focused on the relationship between the global environmental crisis and the crisis in the capitalist economy, while stressing the imperative for a sustainable, socialist alternative. During this period he published The Vulnerable Planet: A Short Economic History of the Environment; his article "Marx's Theory of Metabolic Rift" in the American Journal of Sociology; and Marx's Ecology: Materialism and Nature.

In the preface, Foster states that his “goal is to transcend the idealism, spiritualism … of much of contemporary Green thought, by recovering the deeper critique of the alienation of humanity from nature that was central to Marx’s work.”

== Synopsis ==
In Marx's Ecology, Foster begins in chapters 1-4 by running through the long history of materialism between the Ancient Greek philosopher Epicurus up until Feuerbach, Proudhon, and Malthus. Foster argues that while Marx was initially a young Hegelian, schooled in the idealistic philosophy of Hegel, he encountered materialism through his doctoral thesis, The Difference Between the Democritean and Epicurean Philosophy of Nature.

In his early years as a journalist following this thesis, Marx wrote on the struggle of peasant workers in Prussia, who had been banned from carrying out their traditional practice of collecting firewood in forests. Foster argues that this writing had profoundly ecological implications, for Marx was, for the first time, pondering the alienation of peasants and workers from nature.

Following this, Foster argues that by combining Hegel's concept of a dynamic dialectic with his critiques of Feuerbach and Proudhon's writings on nature, Marx conceptualised the foundation of his dialectical materialism. The key to this was a materialism that was dynamic and not mechanical.

Marx's friend, Roland Daniels, authored the manuscript Mikrokosmos, in which he connected Marx's dialectical materialism with natural science, particularly principles from contemporary ecology. Daniels was familiar with the work of the soil chemist Justus von Liebig and developed the concept of metabolism (Stoffwechsel) and examined how humans gathered and returned energy and material from the environment which he termed as "social metabolism".

=== Metabolic rift theory ===
Foster argues that by combining this concept of social metabolism with a critique of Ricardo and Malthus's conceptions of soil fertility, and with findings of Justin von Liebig and other agriculturalists, Marx came up the idea of metabolic rift. Quoting Marx, Foster defines metabolic rift as the "irreparable rift in the interdependent process of social metabolism". Foster argues that Marx theorized a rupture in the metabolic interaction between humanity and the rest of nature emanating from capitalist agricultural production and the growing division between town and country.

Foster argues that metabolism is Marx's "mature analysis of the alienation of nature" and presents "a more solid—and scientific—way in which to depict the complex, dynamic interchange between human beings and nature, resulting from human labor."

== Reception ==
His work up to and including Marx's Ecology led to his receiving the Distinguished Contribution Award of the American Sociological Association's Environment and Technology section. Marx's Ecology itself received the book award from the ASA's Section on Marxist Sociology.

== Reviews ==
- Kovats-Bernat, J. Christopher (2001). "Review of Marx's Ecology: Materialism and Nature". Human Ecology Review. 8 (1): 73–75. ISSN 1074-4827. JSTOR 24707239.
- Buckstein, Howard (December 2000). "Book Review: Marx's Ecology: Materialism and Nature". The Journal of Environment & Development. 9 (4): 442–444. doi:10.1177/107049650000900408.
- Barry, John (February 2002). "Book Review: Marx's Ecology: Materialism and Nature". Environmental Values. 11 (1): 103–106. doi:10.1177/096327190201100109.
- Engel-Di Mauro, Salvatore (March 2001). "Marx's Ecology: Materialism and Nature". Capitalism, Nature, Socialism. 12 (1): 158–161. ProQuest 200785305.
- Keeling, Ann (December 2005). "Marx's Ecology: Materialism and Nature". Environments. 33 (3): 81. Gale A160322577.
- Grundmann, Reiner (2001). "Review of Marx's Ecology. Materialism and Nature". The Canadian Journal of Sociology / Cahiers canadiens de sociologie. 26 (4): 670–672. doi:10.2307/3341498. ISSN 0318-6431. JSTOR 3341498.
- Snedeker, George (May 2001). "Marx's Ecology: Materialism and Nature". Contemporary Sociology. 30 (3): 309–310. ProQuest 233620690.
- Benton, Ted (2002). "Review of Marx's Ecology: Materialism and Nature". Sociology. 36 (1): 202–205. ISSN 0038-0385. JSTOR 42856379.
- Bocking, Stephen (March 2002). "John Bellamy Foster. Marx's Ecology: Materialism and Nature". Isis. 93 (1): 142–143. doi:10.1086/343317.
