= Spaargaren =

Spaargaren is a Dutch surname. Notable people with the surname include:

- Frank Spaargaren (1940–2020), Dutch hydraulic engineer
- Gert Spaargaren (born 1954), Dutch professor
