= Small Business Act =

Small Business Act may refer to:

- The Small Business Act (United States), which created the Small Business Administration
- The Small Business Act for Europe
