= European Small Business Alliance =

- Abbreviation: ESBA
- Formation: 1998
- Location: Brussels, Belgium
- Region served: Europe
- Website: www.esba-europe.org

The European Small Business Alliance (ESBA) is a non-party political European group, which cares for small business entrepreneurs and the self-employed, and represents them through targeted EU advocacy activities.

ESBA also works towards the development of strong independent advocacy and benefits groups in European countries.

== Overview ==
ESBA was founded in 1998. It is one of the largest organisations based on voluntary membership in Europe.

Through its direct membership, associate membership and cooperation agreements, ESBA today represents almost one million small businesses and covers 36 European countries.

== See also ==
- Small Business Act for Europe
- International Small Business Journal
