= Brett Clark =

Brett Clark may refer to:

- Brett Clark (ice hockey) (born 1976), Canadian professional ice hockey defenceman
- Brett Clark (sociologist), professor of sociology at the University of Utah
- Brett Clark (rugby league) (born 1961), Australian rugby league player
- Brett Clark, Maungakiekie-Tāmaki Local Board member
- Brett Clark (politician), American law enforcement officer and politician

== See also ==
- Brett Clarke (disambiguation)
