= Luigi Pellizzoni =

Italian sociologist and writer

- Born: 1959; Udine, Italy

Academic work
- Discipline: Sociology
- Sub-discipline: Environmental sociology Science and technology studies Political ecology
- Institutions: Scuola Normale Superiore
- Notable works: Ontological Politics in a Disposable World (2015); Handbook of Critical Environmental Politics (2022, co-editor); Nature, Neoliberalism, and New Materialisms (2025)

Luigi Pellizzoni (born 1959) is an Italian sociologist and writer. He is professor of sociology of the environment and territory at the Scuola Normale Superiore in Florence.

Pellizzoni has worked on environmental sociology, science and technology studies and political ecology. He has written books and papers on uncertainty and responsibility in environmental governance, on neoliberalism and technoscience, on ontological politics and on preparedness. He is the author of Ontological Politics in a Disposable World (2015) and Nature, Neoliberalism, and New Materialisms (2025), and co-editor of the Handbook of Critical Environmental Politics (2022).

Pellizzoni is the former vice-president of the European Sociological Association and edited the Rassegna Italiana di Sociologia.

== Career ==
In 1993, Pellizzoni joined the University of Trieste as a ricercatore in sociology and in 2000, became an associate professor. In 2017 he joined the University of Pisa where he became professor, and in 2023 he moved to Scuola Normale Superiore in Florence where he was appointed as a chair of sociology of the environment and territory.

In November 1996 Pellizzoni and Giorgio Osti organised the first Italian national conference of environmental sociologists. He has served on the scientific committee of subsequent editions of the conference. He became a member of the executive committee of the European Sociological Association in 2011 and served on it until 2015. He was then elected to the committee again in September 2021 and was the association's vice-president from 2021 to 2024.

Pellizzoni has coordinated the study group Politics Ontologies Ecologies (POE) since it was formed at the University of Pisa in autumn 2017.

Pellizzoni was co-editor of the journal Sociologica for two years from 2013 to 2015. He was then the editor of the journal Rassegna Italiana di Sociologia from 2021 to 2023.

== Research ==
=== Uncertainty, expertise and responsibility ===
Pellizzoni has suggested that many contemporary technological controversies are marked by what he and others call radical uncertainty, in which there is no consensus on either the relevant knowledge or the principles at stake and the disagreement cannot practically be resolved by argument or empirical evidence. He has argued that, in the relationship between expertise and politics, the issue seems to be the politicisation of science. According to his account, science becomes overabundant, so that controversial decisions cannot be legitimated, and the search for certainty leads to more uncertainty.

Pellizzoni has also written on responsibility in environmental governance, a concept he has called as frequently invoked but underdeveloped. He distinguished four dimensions of responsibility: care, liability, accountability and responsiveness. In his work, he has argued that governance arrangements fixated on liability and accountability had overtaken the idea of a caring state, and that responsiveness had been neglected. Discussing the idea, Jack Stilgoe wrote that by drawing attention to the limits of responsiveness Pellizzoni reconnected debates about responsibility to an older discussion of the social control of technology.

=== Neoliberalism and ontological politics ===
With Giorgio Osti, Pellizzoni wrote the textbook Sociologia dell'ambiente (2003), which identifies different dimensions of unequal access to natural resources. He has argued that environmental justice fits a neoliberal vision of a post-political society of stakeholders, which is fragmented into single-issue disputes and lacks an overall view of structural inequality.

Pellizzoni has characterised neoliberal environmental governance as a mode of governing that works through disorder. He and Marja Ylönen edited Neoliberalism and Technoscience: Critical Assessments (2012), where they argued that neoliberalism and technoscience share a view of the world as infinitely malleable, in which nature becomes a moveable threshold. Peter Wehling called the book "an important step towards more political and politically contextualized science and technology studies". However, he wrote that its contributors left the term technoscience largely undefined. In his review of the book, Christopher Groves asked if neoliberalism's stance towards the future was genuinely new.

Pellizzoni wrote Ontological Politics in a Disposable World, which was published in 2015. In it, he argued that the ontological turn in social theory lacks emancipatory implications and is consistent with neoliberal values. As an alternative to this, he proposed what he called a critical humanism. Mike Michael called the book "a major accomplishment" but he wrote that it did not make comfortable reading for scholars who had taken up the ontological turn. Reviewing the book, Giuliana Parotto doubted that the thought of Giorgio Agamben could offer the way out that the book proposes. Roberta Raffaetà found it unclear how the book's critical humanism could be applied in practice. Andrea Ghelfi wrote that the link the book draws between the indeterminacy of matter and neoliberalism could be a matter of historical contingency.

Pellizzoni argued in Cavalcare l'ingovernabile (2023) that domination now works through change and uncertainty. The book was published in a revised English translation as Nature, Neoliberalism, and New Materialisms: Riding the Ungovernable (2025). Sourav Das called the English edition "a refreshing rebuttal" to the celebration of the ontological turn as emancipatory.

=== Preparedness and later work ===
In his work, Pellizzoni has written that preparedness modulates crises but does not resolve these crises. With Barbara Sena he examined preparedness through Michel Foucault's concept of biopolitical governmentality and characterised it as a "post-securitarian" approach to threats. They wrote that Italy's response to the COVID-19 pandemic combined both disciplinary tools and preventive techniques, and that it gave preparedness a very limited role. He has argued that anticipatory environmental politics blocks the path of actual transformation. He has written that knowledge built on pre-emption and urgency produces what he calls a suspended present, in which the future is opened to value extraction and responsibility for it is evaded.

Pellizzoni co-edited the Handbook of Critical Environmental Politics (2022) with Emanuele Leonardi and Viviana Asara. Heather Alberro wrote that the collection "makes for important reading for students and scholars in the field". She regretted the lack of chapters focused on the other-than-human world. He also edited Introduzione all'Ecologia Politica (2023).

== Selected books ==
- Pellizzoni, Luigi; Osti, Giorgio (2008). Sociologia dell'ambiente. Manuali (in Italian) (2nd ed.). Bologna: Il Mulino. ISBN 978-88-15-12629-0.
- Pellizzoni, Luigi; Ylönen, Marja, eds. (2012). Neoliberalism and Technoscience: Critical Assessments. Theory, Technology and Society. Farnham: Ashgate. doi:10.4324/9781315597775.
- Pellizzoni, Luigi (2015). Ontological Politics in a Disposable World: The New Mastery of Nature. Farnham: Ashgate. doi:10.4324/9781315598925. ISBN 978-1-4724-3494-4.
- Pellizzoni, Luigi; Leonardi, Emanuele; Asara, Viviana, eds. (2022). Handbook of Critical Environmental Politics. Elgar Handbooks in Energy, the Environment and Climate Change. Cheltenham: Edward Elgar. doi:10.4337/9781839100673. ISBN 978-1-83910-066-6.
- Pellizzoni, Luigi (2025). Nature, Neoliberalism, and New Materialisms: Riding the Ungovernable. The Frankfurt School in New Times. Lanham, Maryland: Lexington Books. doi:10.5040/9781978748019. ISBN 978-1-6669-6743-2.
