= Brett Clarke =

Brett Clarke may refer to:

- Brett Clarke (singer)
- Brett Clarke (table tennis), represented Australia at the 2006 Commonwealth Games

== See also ==
- Brett Clark (disambiguation)
