= Recovery plan =

Recovery plan may refer to:

- Disaster recovery plan, a plan to execute an organization's disaster recovery processes, in particular business IT infrastructure, in the event of a disaster
- Endangered species recovery plan, protocols for protecting and enhancing rare and endangered species populations

Economic recovery plans:

- 2008 European Union stimulus plan, to cope with the effects of the Great Recession on EU member countries
- American Recovery and Reinvestment Act of 2009, a U.S. economic a stimulus package
- Christchurch Central Recovery Plan, in response to the 2011 Christchurch (New Zealand) earthquake
- Emergency Economic Stabilization Act of 2008, U.S. legislation also known as the Troubled Assets Recovery Plan

== See also ==
- European Recovery Program (informally known as the Marshall Plan), post-World War II recovery plan for Europe
