= Joseph Huber (economist) =

German academic (born 1948)

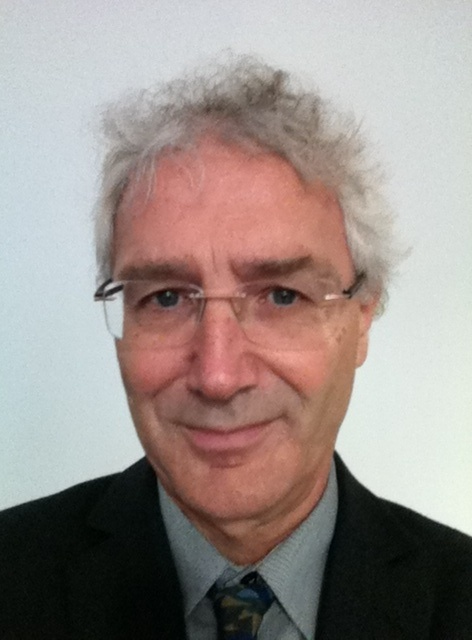
Joseph Huber in 2011.

Joseph Huber (born 4 November 1948 in Mannheim) is a German sociologist and economist known for his contributions to monetary theory and environmental sociology. From 1992 to 2012, he served as the chair of economic and environmental sociology at Martin Luther University of Halle-Wittenberg, Germany.

== Academic career ==
Huber studied Human and Social Sciences at Heidelberg University and obtained a doctorate in Economics at the Free University of Berlin.

Huber was a professor at Martin Luther University Halle-Wittenberg for twenty years, where he developed his theories on monetary systems and environmental innovation. His interdisciplinary approach combined economic sociology with environmental concerns, establishing him as a prominent voice in both fields.

== Monetary theory contributions ==
=== Sovereign money theory ===
Huber is recognized as a leading theorist in monetary reform, particularly for his work on sovereign money systems. He coined the German term "Vollgeld" (meaning "sovereign money"), which describes a monetary system where only the central bank has the authority to create money, eliminating the money creation privileges of commercial banks.

His monetary theories argue that under the current fractional-reserve banking system, commercial banks effectively create money when they issue loans, with only partial backing from central bank reserves. Huber's sovereign money proposal would transfer this money creation function exclusively to central banks, with new money being issued debt-free to government treasuries for public benefit.

=== Influence on reform movements ===
Huber co-founded the German Monetative initiative in 2012. His theoretical framework has provided an intellectual foundation for several European monetary reform movements:

- The German Monetative initiative, which advocates for implementing sovereign money systems
- The Swiss Vollgeld movement, which led to the 2018 Swiss sovereign-money initiative referendum
- Positive Money in the United Kingdom, which campaigns for monetary reform

These movements promote the concept of sovereign money creation as a fourth branch of government, separate from executive, legislative, and judicial powers, arguing this would benefit the public interest.

The development of central bank digital currency (CBDC) has revived interest in his sovereign money concepts, as policymakers grapple with questions about who should control digital money creation.

== Environmental sociology ==
Huber is recognized as one of the founders of ecological modernization theory, which examines how societies can achieve economic growth while reducing environmental impact through technological innovation and policy reform. His research in this area focuses on the relationship between technological development and environmental protection. His environmental work emphasizes the role of innovation in addressing ecological challenges, examining how new technologies can be developed and diffused to create more sustainable economic systems.

== Selected publications ==
- ———; Robertson, James (2000), Creating New Money. A monetary reform for the information age (PDF), London: New Economics Foundation, ISBN 1-899407-29-4.
- ——— (2004), New Technologies and Environmental Innovation, Cheltenham, UK; Northampton, MA: Edward Elgar, ISBN 1-84376-799-6.
- ——— (2008), Pioneer Countries and the Global Diffusion of Environmental Innovations, Global Environmental Change, Vol. 18, No. 3, August 2008, 360–367.
- ——— (2008), Technological environmental innovations (TEIs) in a chain-analytical and lifecycle-analytical perspective, Journal of Cleaner Production, Vol. 16, No. 18, 2008, 1980–1986.
- ——— (2017), Sovereign Money. Beyond Reserve Banking, London: Palgrave Macmillan, ISBN 978-3-319-42173-5.
- ——— (2023), The Monetary Turning Point. From Bank Money to Central Bank Digital Currency (CBDC), New York/London: Palgrave Macmillan, ISBN 978-3-031-23956-4.
