= Carbon rift =

Theory attributing the input and output of carbon into the environment to capitalism

Carbon rift is a theory attributing the input and output of carbon into the environment to human capitalistic systems. This is a derivative of Karl Marx's concept of metabolic rift. In practical terms, increased commodity production demands that greater levels of carbon dioxide (or CO_{2}) be emitted into the biosphere via fossil fuel consumption. Carbon rift theory states that this ultimately disrupts the natural carbon cycle and that this "rift" has adverse effects on nearly every aspect of life. Many of the specifics regarding how this metabolic carbon rift interacts with capitalism are proposed by Brett Clark and Richard York in a 2005 article titled "Carbon Metabolism: Global capitalism, climate change, and the biospheric rift" in the journal Theory and Society. Researchers such as Jean P. Sapinski of the University of Oregon claim that, despite increased interest in closing the carbon rift, it is projected that as long as capitalism continues, there is little hope of reducing the rift.

Both deforestation and the emission of greenhouse gases have been linked to increased atmospheric CO_{2} levels. Carbon rift theory states that these are the result of human production through capitalistic systems. There are proposed solutions to climate change such as geoengineering proposed in the December 2015 Paris Agreement. However, some argue that the capitalist mode of production is at fault for the emission of greenhouse gas and that solutions must be found to this issue before climate change itself can be addressed.

Carbon rift theory shouldn't be confused with alternative explanations for climate change, which attribute the causes of the climate change to factors independent of human activity. Such explanations include the Chaotic Solar System Theory and that increased water vapor is responsible for climate change. Capitalism and human activity are not mutually exclusive explanations for climate change, because capitalism is a form of organization of human societies.

== Summary ==
=== Greenhouse gas emissions ===
Carbon rift is a result of CO_{2} gas being released into the environment by human sources, with the theory focusing specifically on capitalistic ones. In 2014, fossil fuel consumption resulted in nearly 36 billion metric tons of CO_{2} finding its way into natural sinks such as the atmosphere, land, and oceans. This transfer of carbon from the burning of fossil fuels into the biosphere is the primary human-driven cause of greenhouse gas emissions and is closely related to the unchecked behavior of capitalism.

=== Deforestation ===
Another contributing factor to carbon rift is the continual deforestation of the Earth's forests. In doing so, humankind is not only releasing carbon into the biosphere but removing one of the primary ways that carbon is naturally re-absorbed into the carbon cycle. Deforestation can both be tied to having large effects on greenhouse gas emissions (specifically, carbon dioxide) and to capitalism's continual disregard for its use of the truly limited resource represented by the forests. Thus, we have a tie between capitalism, deforestation, and carbon. This is the metabolic pathway defined by carbon rift.

=== Negative effect on humanity ===
As the carbon rift continues to grow, the ecosystems of the biosphere continue to experience detrimental effects. One of the readily observable examples is the acidification of the world's oceans. This occurs when carbon dioxide is absorbed by seawater, lowering its pH. Since the start of the Industrial Revolution, which Marx explicitly ties to capitalism, oceans have experienced a 30% increase in acidity. This acidification and resulting calcification of biological organisms are in part responsible for a decline of fishing as an industry and viable food source. The enlarging carbon rift could result in poorer conditions for human society over time.

== Political and economic implications ==
Carbon rift plays into a larger discussion of climate change caused by humans—a topic with stark political division. In the United States, the right end of the political spectrum tends to either deny/downplay climate change or attribute it to non-human causes, while people on the left stress the dangerous effects it has on the planet and society. While the theory of carbon rift is not particularly well-known, these political divisions transfer to opinions on carbon rift because the theory operates under the belief that reliance on capitalist modes of production is the cause of increased carbon dioxide emissions.

=== Geoengineering ===
The small amount of political and economic analysis that has been done on carbon rift discusses the theory’s relation to geoengineering. While geoengineering is still in the development stage as both a topic and solution to climate change, the December 2015 Paris Agreement highlighted “negative emissions technologies”. These technologies aim to either “remove carbon dioxide from the atmosphere” or “reduce the amount of solar radiation that hits the earth’s surface.

Some scientists and advocacy groups warn that geoengineering will have dangerous, irreversible effects on human society. Furthermore, there is no way to fully test the accuracy of these technologies before launch, making the risk even greater. The 2013 film Snowpiercer offers a grim, politicized portrayal of the possible negative effects of climate engineering. However, other researchers support the develop of such technologies, as they believe their necessity is inevitable. These researchers claim that the climate of capitalistic growth will not falter and greenhouse gas emissions will continue to rise.

Critics of geoengineering emphasize that development of such technologies does not address the cause of carbon rift. Jean Sapinski from the University of Oregon defines the root cause as the “capitalist mode of production and the growth imperative it entails”. The extent of carbon rift relates directly to the dominant economic system and the political institutions that reinforce said system. Essentially, those who find fault in the capitalist system are more likely to believe carbon rift cannot be treated effectively without tackling capitalism first.

== Counterarguments and opposition ==
Carbon rift theory, as a subtopic of both Marxist metabolic theory and climate change, has inherited dissenting viewpoints from both its parent topics. Detractors claim exactly the opposite of carbon rift theory: human production does not have an appreciable effect on the carbon emissions in the biosphere. Since carbon rift theory has not yet made it into the mainstream lexicon, it is not often attacked directly by its detractors, but its concepts are. A notable individual that believes that climate change and human carbon emissions are unrelated is Patrick Moore, of Greenpeace fame. Other theories that explain the growing carbon rift (but exclude capitalism as a contributing factor) are the Chaotic Solar System theory, the claim that carbon is wrongly blamed for the greenhouse effects of water vapor and that the sun is causing global warming. These together are referred to as Non-Consensus views, and lack reliable scientific evidence.

== See also ==
- Carbon cycle – Natural processes of carbon exchange
- Eco-capitalism – View that capital exists in nature as "natural capital"
- Industrial metabolism – Concept describing the material and energy turnover of industrial systems
- Metabolic rift – Marxist conception of capitalist ecological crisis
- Nature-culture divide – Theoretical foundation of anthropology
