= Scale (analytical tool) =

In the study of complex systems and hierarchy theory, the concept of scale refers to the combination of (1) the level of analysis (for example, analyzing the whole or a specific component of the system); and (2) the level of observation (for example, observing a system as an external viewer or as an internal participant). The scale of analysis encompasses both the analytical choice of how to observe a given system or object of study, and the role of the observer in determining the identity of the system. This analytical tool is central to multi-scale analysis (see for example, MuSIASEM, land-use analysis).

For example, on at the scale of analysis of a given population of zebras, the number of predators (e.g. lions) determines the number of prey that survives after hunting, while at the scale of analysis of the ecosystem, the availability of prey determines how many predators can survive in a given area. The semantic categories of "prey" and "predator" are not given, but are defined by the observer.

== See also ==
- Overview effect
- Scale (social sciences)
