= Massachusetts Educational Financing Authority =

Massachusetts not-for-profit student loan authority

- Company type: Quasi-governmental
- Industry: Student loans
- Founded: 1982
- Headquarters: Boston, Massachusetts
- Owner: Commonwealth of Massachusetts
- Website: www.mefa.org

The Massachusetts Educational Financing Authority (MEFA) is a self-financing, not-for-profit state-charted student loan authority created by the Commonwealth of Massachusetts in 1982. The authority was created to provide fixed rate student loans and operate the Massachusetts 529 plan U.Fund, launched in 1999, and its prepaid tuition plan U.Plan, launched in 1995. MEFA previously participated in the Federal Family Education Loan Program and Stafford Loan program. In 2018 the Commonwealth announced that starting in 2020 every child born or adopted in Massachusetts would be eligible for a $50 deposit in a MEFA U.Fund 529 plan, in a program called "SeedMA Baby". The program was rebranded to BabySteps before launch following criticism of the name.

Loans issued by the authority were previously serviced by Affiliated Computer Services (ACS) and are now serviced by PHEAA under its AES brand. ACS was fined $2.4 million by the Massachusetts Attorney General in 2016 for mishandling repayment plans. The authority was previously a member of the National Council of Higher Education Resources before ending its membership following a political dispute.
