= John Bellamy Foster =

American academic (born 1953)

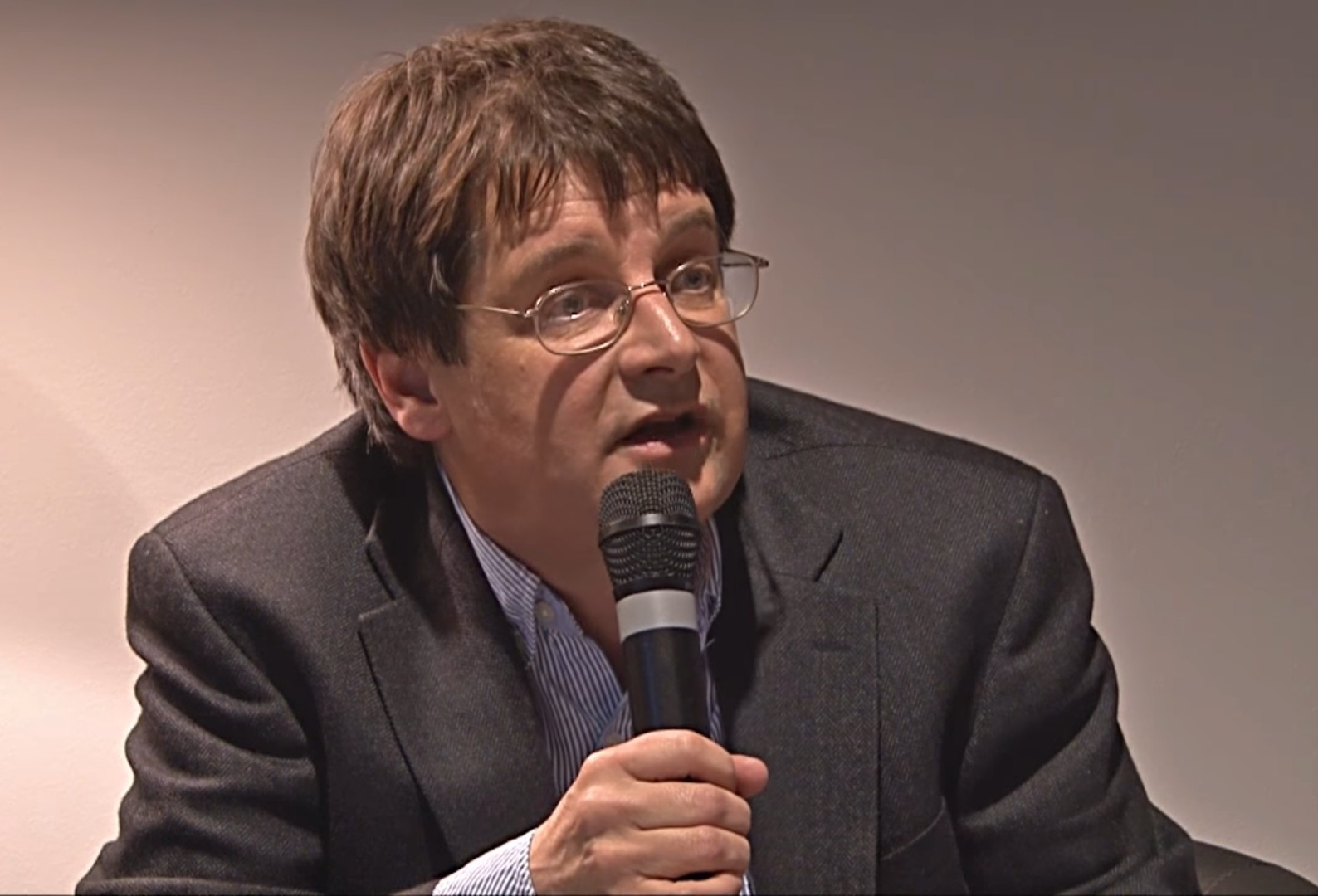
- Born: August 19, 1953 (age 73); Seattle, Washington
- Occupations: professor, editor of Monthly Review
- Employer: University of Oregon
- Title: Professor of Sociology
- Board member of: Monthly Review Foundation
- Awards: Deutscher Memorial Prize (2020)

Academic background
- Education: York University
- Thesis: The Theory of Monopoly Capitalism: An Elaboration of Baran and Sweezy's Approach to Political Economy (1984)
- Doctoral advisor: Robert Albritton

Academic work
- Notable works: Marx's Ecology
- Website: johnbellamyfoster.org

John Bellamy Foster (born August 19, 1953) is an American professor of sociology at the University of Oregon and editor of the Monthly Review. He writes about political economy of capitalism and economic crisis, ecology and ecological crisis, and Marxist theory.

== Early life ==
In 1976, Foster moved to Canada and entered the political science graduate program at York University in Toronto, graduating with a master's degree in 1977. He submitted his 1979 paper, The United States and Monopoly Capital: The Issue of Excess Capacity, to Paul Sweezy of Monthly Review. He contributed to journals such as The Quarterly Journal of Economics and Science & Society, and in 1986 published The Theory of Monopoly Capitalism: An Elaboration of Marxian Political Economy, based on his 1984 Ph.D. dissertation advised by Robert Albritton.

Foster was hired in 1985 as a Visiting Member of the Faculty at Evergreen State College. One year later he took a position as assistant professor of sociology at the University of Oregon, and became a full professor of sociology in 2000. In 1989 he became a director of the Monthly Review Foundation Board and a member of the editorial committee of Monthly Review.

== Monthly Review ==
Foster published his first article for Monthly Review, "Is Monopoly Capital an Illusion?", while in graduate school in 1981. He became a director of the Monthly Review Foundation Board and a member of the Monthly Review editorial committee in 1989. Along with Robert McChesney, who had since their days at Evergreen College become a leading scholar of the political economy of the media, Foster joined Paul Sweezy and Harry Magdoff as a co-editor of Monthly Review in 2000. Two years later, he became president of the Monthly Review Foundation.

After Paul Sweezy's death in 2004, Robert McChesney's resignation as co-editor (while remaining on the board), and Harry Magdoff's death in 2006, Foster was left as sole editor of the magazine.

== Work ==
Foster's initial research centered on Marxian political economies and theories of capitalist development, with a focus on Paul Sweezy and Paul Baran's theory of monopoly. This was reflected in Foster's early book The Theory of Monopoly Capitalism and the 1984 co-edited volume (with Henryk Szlajfer), The Faltering Economy: The Problem of Accumulation under Monopoly Capitalism. Foster has upheld Sweezy and Baran's underconsumption theory of crisis.

In the late 1980s, Foster turned toward issues of ecology. He focused on the relationship between the global environmental crisis and the crisis in the capitalist economy, while stressing the imperative for a sustainable, socialist alternative. During this period he published The Vulnerable Planet: A Short Economic History of the Environment; his article "Marx's Theory of Metabolic Rift" in the American Journal of Sociology; and Marx's Ecology: Materialism and Nature. His reinterpretation of Marx on ecology introduced the concept of "metabolic rift" and was widely influential. This work led to his receiving the Distinguished Contribution Award of the American Sociological Association's Environment and Technology section. Marx's Ecology itself received the book award from the ASA's Section on Marxist Sociology. This work was soon followed up by his book Ecology Against Capitalism, which focused on the critique of capitalist economics from the standpoint of the environment.

As editor of Monthly Review, Foster returned to his earlier work on the political economy of capitalism, but with a renewed focus on the role of U.S. foreign policy following September 2001. His 2006 book Naked Imperialism, along with frequent editorials in the pages of Monthly Review, attempted to account for the growing U.S. military role in the world and the shift toward a more visible, aggressive global projection. Additionally, Foster has worked to expand Sweezy and Baran's theory of monopoly capital in light of the current financially led phase of capitalism, which he terms "monopoly-finance Capital." In this context he has written several books on the financialization of capitalism and the 2008 financial crisis.

Critique of Intelligent Design, Foster's book co-authored with Brett Clark and Richard York, is a continuation of his research on materialist philosophy and the relationship between ancient Greek philosopher Epicurus and Karl Marx. Drawing on his ecological work, particularly Marx's Ecology, Foster defends historical materialism as fundamental to a rational, scientific worldview, against proponents of intelligent design and other non-materialist ideologies.

Foster's book The Return of Nature: Socialism and Ecology (2020) won the Deutscher Memorial Prize for that year. In the book, "Foster explores how socialist analysts and materialist scientists of various stamps, first in Britain, then the United States, from William Morris and Friedrich Engels to Joseph Needham, Rachel Carson, and Stephen Jay Gould, sought to develop a dialectical naturalism, rooted in a critique of capitalism."

== Bibliography ==
- The Vulnerable Planet (1999)
- Marx's Ecology (2000)
- Ecology Against Capitalism (2002)
- The Ecological Revolution (2009)
- The Theory of Monopoly Capitalism (2014)
- Foster, J.B., B. Clark, and R. York (2010) The Ecological Rift
- Foster, J.B. and R.W. McChesney (2012) The Endless Crisis
- Foster, J.B. and P. Burkett (2016) Marx and the Earth
- Trump in the White House: Tragedy and Farce (2017)
- The Return of Nature: Socialism and Ecology (2020)
- Capitalism in the Anthropocene: Ecological Ruin or Ecological Revolution (2022)
- The Dialectics of Ecology: Socialism and Nature (2024)

== Articles, lectures, and interviews ==
- 1999. Marx's theory of metabolic rift: classical foundations for environmental sociology. American Journal of Sociology 105(2):366-405. DOI: 10.1086/210315
- 2016. Marxism in the Anthropocene: dialectical rifts on the Left. International Critical Thought 6(3):393-421. DOI: 10.1080/21598282.2016.1197787

== See also ==
- Eco-socialism
- Environmental sociology
- Metabolic rift
- Social metabolism

Awards
Preceded by Brett Christophers	Deutscher Memorial Prize; 2020	Succeeded by Ronald Grigor Suny
