= Peak fossil fuel =

Peak fossil fuel may refer to:

- Peak fossil fuel production; see Hubbert peak theory#Hubbert curve.
- Peak coal.
- Peak gas.
- Peak oil.
