= Ecological modernization =

Environmental theory linking economic growth with sustainable technological solutions

Ecological modernization is a school of thought that argues that both the state and the market can work together to protect the environment. It has gained increasing attention among scholars and policymakers in the last several decades internationally. It is an analytical approach as well as a policy strategy and environmental discourse.

== Origins and key elements ==
Ecological modernization emerged in the early 1980s within a group of scholars at Free University and the Social Science Research Centre in Berlin, among them Joseph Huber, Martin Jänicke and Udo E. Simonis. Various authors pursued similar ideas at the time, e.g. Arthur H. Rosenfeld, Amory Lovins, Donald Huisingh, René Kemp, or Ernst Ulrich von Weizsäcker. Further substantial contributions were made by Arthur P.J. Mol, Gert Spaargaren and David A Sonnenfeld.

One basic assumption of ecological modernization relates to environmental readaptation of economic growth and industrial development. On the basis of enlightened self-interest, economy and ecology can be favourably combined: Environmental productivity, i.e. productive use of natural resources and environmental media (air, water, soil, ecosystems), can be a source of future growth and development in the same way as labour productivity and capital productivity. This includes increases in energy and resource efficiency as well as product and process innovations such as environmental management and sustainable supply chain management, clean technologies, benign substitution of hazardous substances, and product design for environment. Radical innovations in these fields can not only reduce quantities of resource turnover and emissions, but also change the quality or structure of the industrial metabolism. In the co-evolution of humans and nature, and in order to upgrade the environment's carrying capacity, ecological modernization gives humans an active role to play, which may entail conflicts with nature conservation.

There are different understandings of the scope of ecological modernization - whether it is just about techno-industrial progress and related aspects of policy and economy, and to what extent it also includes cultural aspects (ecological modernization of mind, value orientations, attitudes, behaviour and lifestyles). Similarly, there is some pluralism as to whether ecological modernization would need to rely mainly on government, or markets and entrepreneurship, or civil society, or some sort of multi-level governance combining the three. Some scholars explicitly refer to general modernization theory as well as non-Marxist world-system theory, others don't.

Ultimately, however, there is a common understanding that ecological modernization will have to result in innovative structural change. So research is now still more focused on environmental innovations, or eco-innovations, and the interplay of various societal factors (scientific, economic, institutional, legal, political, cultural) which foster or hamper such innovations (Weber and Hemmelskamp, 2005).

Ecological modernization shares a number of features with neighbouring, overlapping approaches. Among the most important are:

- the concept of sustainable development
- the approach of industrial metabolism
- the concept of industrial ecology

== Additional elements ==
A special topic of ecological modernization research during recent years was sustainable household, i.e. environment-oriented reshaping of lifestyles, consumption patterns, and demand-pull control of supply chains.

Some scholars of ecological modernization share an interest in industrial symbiosis, i.e. inter-site recycling that helps to reduce the consumption of resources via increasing efficiency (i.e. pollution prevention, waste reduction), typically by taking externalities from one economic production process and using them as raw material inputs for another.

Ecological modernization also relies on product life-cycle assessment and the analysis of materials and energy flows. In this context, ecological modernization promotes 'cradle to cradle' manufacturing, contrasted against the usual 'cradle to grave' forms of manufacturing - where waste is not re-integrated back into the production process. Another special interest in the ecological modernization literature has been the role of social movements and the emergence of civil society as a key agent of change.

As a strategy of change, some forms of ecological modernization may be favored by business interests because they seemingly meet the triple bottom line of economics, society, and environment, which, it is held, underpin sustainability, yet do not challenge free market principles. This contrasts with many environmental movement perspectives, which regard free trade and its notion of business self-regulation as part of the problem, or even an origin of environmental degradation.

Under ecological modernization, the state is seen in a variety of roles and capacities: as the enabler for markets that help produce the technological advances via competition; as the regulatory (see regulation) medium through which corporations are forced to 'take back' their various wastes and re-integrate them in some manner into the production of new goods and services (e.g. the way that car corporations in Germany are required to accept back cars they manufactured once those vehicles have reached the end of their product lifespan); and in some cases as an institution that is incapable of addressing critical local, national, and global environmental problems. In the latter case, ecological modernization shares with Ulrich Beck and others notions of the necessity of emergence of new forms of environmental governance, sometimes referred to as sub-politics or political modernization, where the environmental movement, community groups, businesses, and other stakeholders increasingly take on direct and leadership roles in stimulating environmental transformation.

Political modernization of this sort requires certain supporting norms and institutions such as a free, independent, or at least critical press, basic human rights of expression, organization, and assembly, etc. New media, such as the Internet greatly facilitate this.

== Criticisms ==
Critics argue that ecological modernization will fail to protect the environment and does nothing to alter the impulses within the capitalist economic mode of production (see capitalism) that inevitably lead to environmental degradation. As such, it is just a form of 'green-washing'. Critics question whether technological advances alone can achieve resource conservation and better environmental protection, particularly if left to business self-regulation practices. For instance, many technological improvements are currently feasible but not widely utilized. The most environmentally friendly product or manufacturing process (which is often also the most economically efficient) is not always the one automatically chosen by self-regulating corporations (e.g. hydrogen or biofuel vs. peak oil).

In addition, some critics have argued that ecological modernization does not redress gross injustices that are produced within the capitalist system, such as environmental racism - where people of color and low income earners bear a disproportionate burden of environmental harm such as pollution, and lack access to environmental benefits such as parks, and social justice issues such as eliminating unemployment - environmental racism is also referred to as issues of the asymmetric distribution of environmental resources and services. Moreover, the theory seems to have limited global efficacy, applying primarily to its countries of origin - Germany and the Netherlands, and having little to say about the developing world. Perhaps the harshest criticism though, is that ecological modernization is predicated upon the notion of 'sustainable growth', and in reality this is not possible because growth entails the consumption of natural and human capital at great costs to ecosystems and societies.

Ecological modernization, its effectiveness and applicability, strengths and limitations, remains a dynamic and contentious area of environmental social science research and policy discourse in the early 21st century.

== See also ==
- Bright green environmentalism
- Ecological design
- Ecological civilization
- Ecomodernism
- Environmental sociology
- Reflexive modernization
- Restoration ecology
- Sustainable development
