= Gert Spaargaren =

Gert Spaargaren (born February, 1954) is a Dutch professor at the Wageningen University, author, and editor. Spaargaren is from Aalsmeer, Netherlands, and is currently teaching Environmental Policy for sustainability and patterns of consumption in the Department of Social Sciences. His fields of expertise are Consumer Studies and Environmental policy.

== Career ==
He began his career at Wareningen University in Netherlands in June 1985. Between 1999 and 2003, Spaargaren held a professorship at Tilburg University, teaching policy of environmental education. In 1999 he completed his dissertation on the ecological modernization of production and consumption at Wageningen University. Spaargaren has been Senior Lecturer in Environmental Sociology and Policy at the Environmental Policy Group since 1999.

In 2000 Spaargaren wrote "Governing Environmental Flows: Global Challenges to Social Theory."

== Published works ==
A partial list of Spaargaren's published works is:

- "Eco-teams: milieuverandering voor en achter de meter." (1995)
- "Governing Environmental Flows: Global Challenges to Social Theory" (2006)
- "Brug slaan naar gewone burger" (2005)
- "The laboratory of everyday life - The citizen-consumer as change-agent" (2010)
- Spaargaren, Gert (August 2011). "Theories of practices: Agency, technology, and culture". Global Environmental Change. 21 (3): 813–822. doi:10.1016/j.gloenvcha.2011.03.010.
- Spaargaren, Gert (2012). Food practices in transition : changing food consumption, retail and production in the age of reflexive modernity. New York: Routledge. ISBN 9780415880848.
- Spaargaren, Gert; Mol, Arthur P.J. (February 2013). "Carbon flows, carbon markets, and low-carbon lifestyles:reflecting on the role of markets in climategovernance". Environmental Politics. 22 (1): 174–193. doi:10.1080/09644016.2013.755840.
