= 2008 European Union stimulus plan =

Economic policy in the European Union

On 26 November 2008, the European Commission proposed a European stimulus plan (also referred to as the European Economic Recovery Plan) amounting to 200 billion euros to cope with Great Recession in Europe and the 2008 financial crisis. It aimed at limiting the effects of the Great Recession through national economic policies, with measures extended over a period of two years.

== Presentation of the plan ==
The European Commission published a plan on 26 November 2008 responding to the current economic crisis in the 27 member countries of the Union. The plan combined short-term measures to stimulate demand and maintain jobs and longer-term measures to invest in strategic sectors, including research and innovation. The aim was to promote growth and ensure sustainable prosperity.

The plan included targeted and temporary measures amounting to 200 billion euros, or 1.5% of EU GDP, using both the national budgets of the national governments, the budget of the EU and that of the European Investment Bank. The plan also built on the Small Business Act for Europe, published earlier in June 2008, which was concerned with supporting the small business sector within the European Union.

== Measures ==
The plan included a broad range of actions at the national level and at EU level to help households and industrial firms (particularly automobile and construction).

The measures included:

- reflation: the Commission would allow Member States to break the Stability and Growth Pact for two or three years.
- incentives to investment: the plan outlined measures to encourage the fight against climate change and promotes strategic investments in buildings and energy-efficient technologies.
- lower rates: the ECB was invited to drop its rates.
- tax rebates: lowering taxation on green technology and eco-friendly cars, accompanied by scrappage programs
- social measures: the Commission proposed that governments could temporarily increase unemployment benefits and their duration, to increase allowances to households, to lower taxes on low incomes, to lower social security contributions paid on low wages by employers, to reduce labour costs paid by employees with low incomes, to provide subsidized loans or credit guarantees for companies, to reduce temporarily the VAT rate to support consumption. The Commission announced it would adopt by mid-March 2009 a proposal to lower VAT rates for services with high labour-intensiveness (such as catering).

On implementation, the Commission requested member state leaders meeting at the European Council on 11-12 December 2008 to endorse the plan.

== National plans ==
National plans are often close to 1.2 percentage points of GDP, as recommended by the European Commission, and are focused on 2008 and 2009. However, Germany and Spain have announced fiscal stimulus of respectively 3.3% (two plans altogether) and 8.1% of their GDP.

The plan announced by the European Commission at the end of November recommended measures to revive the economy but did not specify much the nature of the plans. Some plans are focused on the stimulation of demand (United Kingdom, to a lesser extent Spain, Italy or the second German plan), other plans insist more in incentives to supply (French plan, first German plan ).

Measures took on expenditure to improve demand generally include measures to support medium-term growth through increased public spending on infrastructures (road networks and railway) and aids to the housing sector (notably construction and renovation). Several countries have also announced short-term measures to relieve the effects of the crisis on the poorest people (increase in benefits and allowances to households with low incomes and unemployed). However, these aids have often limited effects on the economy, because their amounts are insignificant.

Other measures affected national taxation systems. The UK was the only country that opted for a temporary decline in the standard VAT rate, by 2.5 percentage points. In Germany, employer contributions were lowered. Most plans include incentive measures to SMEs and development of green energy.

Country	Date	Type	Amount in billion euros (% of GDP)		Measures
Germany	November 2008	first plan	32 (1.3%)	82 (3.3%)	Investments in infrastructures
Germany	January 2009	second plan	50 (2%)	82 (3.3%)	Public investments
France	December 2008	stimulus plan	26 (1.3%)		Aids to auto industry (2 billion); Aids to construction and housing (2 billion); Public works (10.5 bn); Aids to improve companies' liquidity (10 bn)
Spain	April 2008	first plan	20 (1.8%)	90 (8.1%)	Increase in minimum wage from €570 to €800 by 2012; Tax cuts; Benefit of €400 for each fiscal household; Tax rebates for the housing sector; Suppression of the wealth tax
Spain	August 2008	second plan	20 (1.8%)	90 (8.1%)	Aids to SMEs; Construction of social housing
Spain	November 2008	third plan	50 (4.5%)	90 (8.1%)	Suppression of contributions and incentives to hire unemployed; Expenditures in research and development; Aids to auto industry
Italy	May 2008	election pledges	9 (0.6%)		Suppression of taxation on overtime; Suppression of the housing tax
Italy	November 2008	anti-crisis plan	9 (0.6%)		Aids to low-incomes households (3 bn); Tax rebates for companies (2.3 bn) and households (0.7 milliard)
Netherlands	September 2008	budget bill	2.5 (0.4%)	8.5 (1.4%)	Tax rebates for households and firms; Cancellation of the increase of VAT rate; Suppression of unemployment contributions
Netherlands	November 2008	stimulus plan	6 (1%)	8.5 (1.4%)	Tax rebates; Social benefits; Aids to improve the liquidity of companies; Public expenditure (works)
United Kingdom	September 2008	urgency measures	£1 billion	£31 bn (2.2%)	Aids to real estate sector
United Kingdom	November 2008	stimulus plan	£20 billion	£31 bn (2.2%)	VAT taxation rate lowered from 17.5% to 15% until 2010
United Kingdom	January 2009	additional measures	£10 billion	£31 bn (2.2%)	Building program (school, hospitals, green energy) to create 100,000 jobs
