= Environmental sociology =

Study of interactions between societies and their natural environments

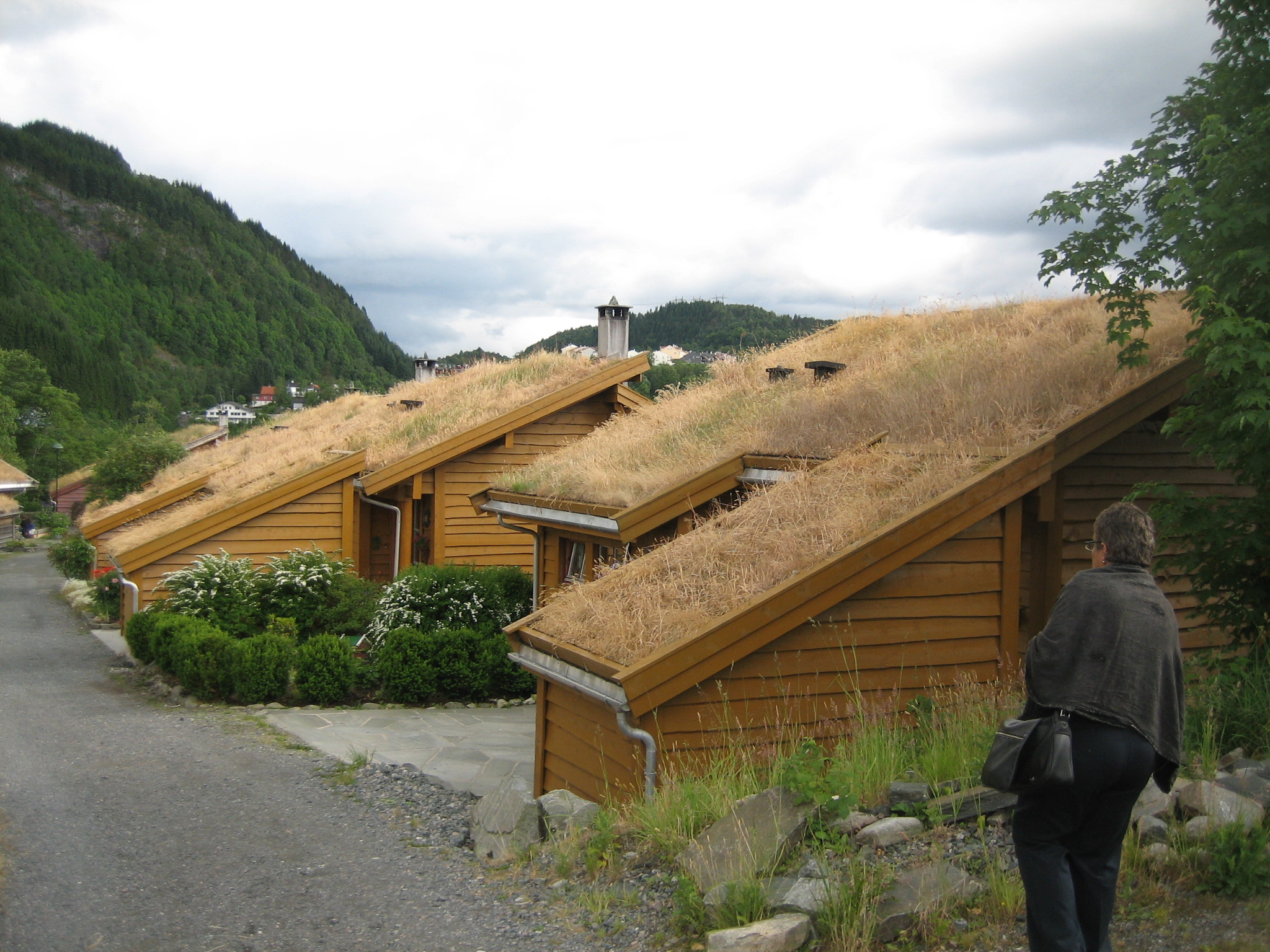
An ecovillage in Torvetua, Norway

Environmental sociology is the study of interactions between societies and their natural environment. The field emphasizes the social factors that influence environmental resource management and cause environmental issues, the processes by which these environmental problems are socially constructed and define as social issues, and societal responses to these problems.

Environmental sociology emerged as a subfield of sociology in the late 1970s in response to the emergence of the environmental movement in the 1960s. It represents a relatively new area of inquiry focusing on an extension of earlier sociology through inclusion of physical context as related to social factors.

== Definition ==
Environmental sociology is typically defined as the sociological study of socio-environmental interactions, although this definition immediately presents the problem of integrating human cultures with the rest of the environment. Different aspects of human interaction with the natural environment are studied by environmental sociologists including population and demography, organizations and institutions, science and technology, health and illness, consumption and sustainability practices, culture and identity, and social inequality and environmental justice.

Although the focus of the field is the relationship between society and environment in general, environmental sociologists typically place special emphasis on studying the social factors that cause environmental problems, the societal impacts of those problems, and efforts to solve the problems. In addition, considerable attention is paid to the social processes by which certain environmental conditions become socially defined as problems. Most research in environmental sociology examines contemporary societies.

== History ==
Environmental sociology emerged as a coherent subfield of inquiry after the environmental movement of the 1960s and early 1970s. The works of William R. Catton, Jr. and Riley Dunlap, among others, challenged the constricted anthropocentrism of classical sociology. In the late 1970s, they called for a new holistic, or systems perspective, which lead to a marked shift in the field’s focus. Since the 1970s, general sociology has noticeably transformed to include environmental forces in social explanations. Environmental sociology has now solidified as a respected, interdisciplinary field of study in academia.

== Concepts ==
=== Existential dualism ===
The duality of the human condition rests with cultural uniqueness and evolutionary traits. From one perspective, humans are embedded in the ecosphere and co-evolved alongside other species. Humans share the same basic ecological dependencies as other inhabitants of nature. From the other perspectives, humans are distinguished from other species because of their innovative capacities, distinct cultures and varied institutions. Human creations have the power to independently manipulate, destroy, and transcend the limits of the natural environment.

According to Buttel (2004), there are five major traditions in environmental sociology today: the treadmill of production and other eco-Marxisms, ecological modernization and other sociologies of environmental reform, cultural-environmental sociologies, neo-Malthusianisms, and the new ecological paradigm. In practice, this means five different theories of what to blame for environmental degradation, i.e., what to research or consider as important. These ideas are listed below in the order in which they were invented. Ideas that emerged later built on earlier ideas, and contradicted them.

=== Neo-Malthusianism ===
Works such as Hardin's "Tragedy of the Commons" (1969) reformulated Malthusian thought about abstract population increases causing famines into a model of individual selfishness at larger scales causing degradation of common pool resources such as the air, water, the oceans, or general environmental conditions. Hardin offered privatization of resources or government regulation as solutions to environmental degradation caused by tragedy of the commons conditions. Many other sociologists shared this view of solutions well into the 1970s (see Ophuls). There have been many critiques of this view particularly political scientist Elinor Ostrom, or economists Amartya Sen and Ester Boserup. Sociologists have developed a critical counter to Hardin's thesis called The Tragedy of the Commodity.

Even though much of mainstream journalism considers Malthusianism the only view of environmentalism, most sociologists would disagree with Malthusianism since social organizational issues of environmental degradation are more demonstrated to cause environmental problems than abstract population or selfishness per se. For examples of this critique, Ostrom in her book Governing the Commons: The Evolution of Institutions for Collective Action (1990) argues that instead of self-interest always causing degradation, it can sometimes motivate people to take care of their common property resources. To do this they must change the basic organizational rules of resource use. Her research provides evidence for sustainable resource management systems, around common pool resources that have lasted for centuries in some areas of the world.

Amartya Sen argues in his book Poverty and Famines: An Essay on Entitlement and Deprivation (1980) that population expansion fails to cause famines or degradation as Malthusians or Neo-Malthusians argue. Instead, in documented cases a lack of political entitlement to resources that exist in abundance, causes famines in some populations. He documents how famines can occur even in the midst of plenty or in the context of low populations. He argues that famines (and environmental degradation) would only occur in non-functioning democracies or unrepresentative states.

Ester Boserup argues in her book The Conditions of Agricultural Growth: The Economics of Agrarian Change under Population Pressure (1965) from inductive, empirical case analysis that Malthus's more deductive conception of a presumed one-to-one relationship with agricultural scale and population is actually reversed. Instead of agricultural technology and scale determining and limiting population as Malthus attempted to argue, Boserup argued the world is full of cases of the direct opposite: that population changes and expands agricultural methods.

Eco-Marxist scholar Allan Schnaiberg (below) argues against Malthusianism with the rationale that under larger capitalist economies, human degradation moved from localized, population-based degradation to organizationally caused degradation of capitalist political economies to blame. He gives the example of the organized degradation of rainforest areas which states and capitalists push people off the land before it is degraded by organizational means. Thus, many authors are critical of Malthusianism, from sociologists (Schnaiberg) to economists (Sen and Boserup), to political scientists (Ostrom), and all focus on how a country's social organization of its extraction can degrade the environment independent of abstract population.

=== New Ecological Paradigm ===
In the 1970s, the New Ecological Paradigm (NEP) conception critiqued the claimed lack of human-environmental focus in the classical sociologists and the sociological priorities their followers created. This was critiqued as the Human Exemptionalism Paradigm (HEP). The HEP viewpoint claims that human-environmental relationships were unimportant sociologically because humans are 'exempt' from environmental forces via cultural change. This view was shaped by the leading Western worldview of the time and the desire for sociology to establish itself as an independent discipline against the then popular racist-biological environmental determinism where environment was all. In this HEP view, human dominance was felt to be justified by the uniqueness of culture, argued to be more adaptable than biological traits. Furthermore, culture also has the capacity to accumulate and innovate, making it capable of solving all natural problems. Therefore, as humans were not conceived of as governed by natural conditions, they were felt to have complete control of their own destiny. Any potential limitation posed by the natural world was felt to be surpassed using human ingenuity. Research proceeded accordingly without environmental analysis.

In the 1970s, sociological scholars Riley Dunlap and William R. Catton, Jr. began recognizing the limits of what would be termed the Human Excemptionalism Paradigm. Catton and Dunlap (1978) suggested a new perspective that took environmental variables into full account. They coined a new theoretical outlook for sociology, the New Ecological Paradigm, with assumptions contrary to HEP.

The NEP recognizes the innovative capacity of humans, but says that humans are still ecologically interdependent as with other species. The NEP notes the power of social and cultural forces but does not profess social determinism. Instead, humans are impacted by the cause, effect, and feedback loops of ecosystems. The Earth has a finite level of natural resources and waste repositories. Thus, the biophysical environment can impose constraints on human activity. They discussed a few harbingers of this NEP in 'hybridized' theorizing about topics that were neither exclusively social nor environmental explanations of environmental conditions. It was additionally a critique of Malthusian views of the 1960s and 1970s.

Dunlap and Catton's work immediately received a critique from Buttel who argued to the contrary that classical sociological foundations could be found for environmental sociology, particularly in Weber's work on ancient "agrarian civilizations" and Durkheim's view of the division of labor as built on a material premise of specialization/specialization in response to material scarcity. This environmental aspect of Durkheim has been discussed by Schnaiberg (1971) as well.

=== Treadmill of production theory ===
The Treadmill of Production is a theory coined and popularized by Schnaiberg as a way to answer for the increase in U.S. environmental degradation post World War II. At its simplest, this theory states that the more product or commodities are created, the more resources will be used, and the higher the impact will be. The treadmill is a metaphor of being caught in the cycle of continuous growth which never stops, demanding more resources and as a result causing more environmental damage.

=== Eco-Marxism ===
In the middle of the HEP/NEP debate, neo-Marxist ideas of conflict sociology were applied to environmental conflicts. Therefore, some sociologists wanted to stretch Marxist ideas of social conflict to analyze environmental social movements from the Marxist materialist framework instead of interpreting them as a cultural "New Social Movement", separate from material concerns. So "Eco-Marxism" was developed based on using neo-Marxist Conflict theories concepts of the relative autonomy of the state and applying them to environmental conflict.

Two people following this school were James O'Connor (The Fiscal Crisis of the State, 1971) and later Allan Schnaiberg.

Later, a different trend developed in eco-Marxism via the attention brought to the importance of metabolic analysis in Marx's thought by John Bellamy Foster. Contrary to previous assumptions that classical theorists in sociology all had fallen within a Human Exemptionalist Paradigm, Foster argued that Marx's materialism lead him to theorize labor as the metabolic process between humanity and the rest of nature. In Promethean interpretations of Marx that Foster critiques, there was an assumption his analysis was very similar to the anthropocentric views critiqued by early environmental sociologists. Instead, Foster argued Marx himself was concerned about the Metabolic rift generated by capitalist society's social metabolism, particularly in industrial agriculture—Marx had identified an "irreparable rift in the interdependent process of social metabolism," created by capitalist agriculture that was destroying the productivity of the land and creating wastes in urban sites that failed to be reintegrated into the land and thus lead toward destruction of urban workers health simultaneously. Reviewing the contribution of this thread of eco-marxism to current environmental sociology, Pellow and Brehm conclude, "The metabolic rift is a productive development in the field because it connects current research to classical theory and links sociology with an interdisciplinary array of scientific literatures focused on ecosystem dynamics."

Foster emphasized that his argument presupposed the "magisterial work" of Paul Burkett, who had developed a closely related "red-green" perspective rooted in a direct examination of Marx's value theory. Burkett and Foster proceeded to write a number of articles together on Marx's ecological conceptions, reflecting their shared perspective.

More recently, Jason W. Moore, inspired by Burkett's value-analytical approach to Marx's ecology and arguing that Foster's work did not in itself go far enough, has sought to integrate the notion of metabolic rift with world systems theory, incorporating Marxian value-related conceptions. For Moore, the modern world-system is a capitalist world-ecology, joining the accumulation of capital, the pursuit of power, and the production of nature in dialectical unity. Central to Moore's perspective is a philosophical re-reading of Marx's value theory, through which abstract social labor and abstract social nature are dialectically bound. Moore argues that the emergent law of value, from the sixteenth century, was evident in the extraordinary shift in the scale, scope, and speed of environmental change. What took premodern civilizations centuries to achieve—such as the deforestation of Europe in the medieval era—capitalism realized in mere decades. This world-historical rupture, argues Moore, can be explained through a law of value that regards labor productivity as the decisive metric of wealth and power in the modern world. From this standpoint, the genius of capitalist development has been to appropriate uncommodified natures—including uncommodified human natures—as a means of advancing labor productivity in the commodity system.

==== Societal-environment dialectic ====
In 1975, the highly influential work of Allan Schnaiberg transfigured environmental sociology, proposing a societal-environmental dialectic, though within the 'neo-Marxist' framework of the relative autonomy of the state as well. This conflictual concept has overwhelming political salience. First, the economic synthesis states that the desire for economic expansion will prevail over ecological concerns. Policy will decide to maximize immediate economic growth at the expense of environmental disruption. Secondly, the managed scarcity synthesis concludes that governments will attempt to control only the most dire of environmental problems to prevent health and economic disasters. This will give the appearance that governments act more environmentally consciously than they really do. Third, the ecological synthesis generates a hypothetical case where environmental degradation is so severe that political forces would respond with sustainable policies. The driving factor would be economic damage caused by environmental degradation. The economic engine would be based on renewable resources at this point. Production and consumption methods would adhere to sustainability regulations.

These conflict-based syntheses have several potential outcomes. One is that the most powerful economic and political forces will preserve the status quo and bolster their dominance. Historically, this is the most common occurrence. Another potential outcome is for contending powerful parties to fall into a stalemate. Lastly, tumultuous social events may result that redistribute economic and political resources.

In 1980, the highly influential work of Allan Schnaiberg entitled The Environment: From Surplus to Scarcity (1980) was a large contribution to this theme of a societal-environmental dialectic.

=== Ecological modernization and reflexive modernization ===
By the 1980s, a critique of eco-Marxism was in the offing, given empirical data from countries (mostly in Western Europe like the Netherlands, Western Germany and somewhat the United Kingdom) that were attempting to wed environmental protection with economic growth instead of seeing them as separate. This was done through both state and capital restructuring. Major proponents of this school of research are Arthur P. J. Mol and Gert Spaargaren. Popular examples of ecological modernization would be "cradle to cradle" production cycles, industrial ecology, large-scale organic agriculture, biomimicry, permaculture, agroecology and certain strands of sustainable development—all implying that economic growth is possible if that growth is well organized with the environment in mind.

Reflexive modernization The many volumes of the German sociologist Ulrich Beck first argued from the late 1980s that our risk society is potentially being transformed by the environmental social movements of the world into structural change without rejecting the benefits of modernization and industrialization. This is leading to a form of 'reflexive modernization' with a world of reduced risk and better modernization process in economics, politics, and scientific practices as they are made less beholden to a cycle of protecting risk from correction (which he calls our state's organized irresponsibility)—politics creates ecodisasters, then claims responsibility in an accident, yet nothing remains corrected because it challenges the very structure of the operation of the economy and the private dominance of development, for example. Beck's idea of a reflexive modernization looks forward to how our ecological and social crises in the late 20th century are leading toward transformations of the whole political and economic system's institutions, making them more "rational" with ecology in mind.

=== Neoliberalism ===
Neoliberalism includes deregulation, free market capitalism, and aims at reducing government spending. These neoliberal policies greatly affect environmental sociology. Since neoliberalism includes deregulation and essentially less government involvement, this leads to the commodification and privatization of unowned, state-owned, or common property resources. Diana Liverman and Silvina Vilas mention that this results in payments for environmental services; deregulation and cuts in public expenditure for environmental management; the opening up of trade and investment; and transfer of environmental management to local or nongovernmental institutions. The privatization of these resources have impacts on society, the economy, and to the environment. An example that has greatly affected society is the privatization of water.

=== Social construction of the environment ===
Additionally, in the 1980s, with the rise of postmodernism in the western academy and the appreciation of discourse as a form of power, some sociologists turned to analyzing environmental claims as a form of social construction more than a 'material' requirement. Proponents of this school include John A. Hannigan, particularly in Environmental Sociology: A Social Constructionist Perspective (1995). Hannigan argues for a 'soft constructionism' (environmental problems are materially real though they require social construction to be noticed) over a 'hard constructionism' (the claim that environmental problems are entirely social constructs).

Although there was sometimes acrimonious debate between the constructivist and realist "camps" within environmental sociology in the 1990s, the two sides have found considerable common ground as both increasingly accept that while most environmental problems have a material reality they nonetheless become known only via human processes such as scientific knowledge, activists' efforts, and media attention. In other words, most environmental problems have a real ontological status despite our knowledge/awareness of them stemming from social processes, processes by which various conditions are constructed as problems by scientists, activists, media and other social actors. Correspondingly, environmental problems must all be understood via social processes, despite any material basis they may have external to humans. This interactiveness is now broadly accepted, but many aspects of the debate continue in contemporary research in the field.

== Events ==
=== Modern environmentalism ===
United States

The 1960s built strong cultural momentum for environmental causes, giving birth to the modern environmental movement and large questioning in sociologists interested in analyzing the movement. Widespread green consciousness moved vertically within society, resulting in a series of policy changes across many states in the U.S. and Europe in the 1970s. In the United States, this period was known as the "Environmental Decade" with the creation of the United States Environmental Protection Agency and passing of the Endangered Species Act, Clean Water Act, and amendments to the Clean Air Act. Earth Day of 1970, celebrated by millions of participants, represented the modern age of environmental thought. The environmental movement continued with incidences such as Love Canal.

=== Historical studies ===
While the current mode of thought expressed in environmental sociology was not prevalent until the 1970s, its application is now used in analysis of ancient peoples. Societies including Easter Island, the Anasazi, and the Mayans were argued to have ended abruptly, largely due to poor environmental management. This has been challenged in later work however as the exclusive cause (biologically-trained Jared Diamond's Collapse (2005); or more modern work on Easter Island). The collapse of the Mayans sent a historic message that even advanced cultures are vulnerable to ecological suicide—though Diamond argues now it was less of a suicide than an environmental climate change that led to a lack of an ability to adapt—and a lack of elite willingness to adapt even when faced with the signs much earlier of nearing ecological problems. At the same time, societal successes for Diamond included New Guinea and Tikopia island whose inhabitants have lived sustainably for 46,000 years.

John Dryzek et al. argue in Green States and Social Movements: Environmentalism in the United States, United Kingdom, Germany, and Norway (2003) that there may be a common global green environmental social movement, though its specific outcomes are nationalist, falling into four 'ideal types' of interaction between environmental movements and state power. They use as their case studies environmental social movements and state interaction from Norway, the United Kingdom, the United States, and Germany. They analyze the past 30 years of environmentalism and the different outcomes that the green movement has taken in different state contexts and cultures.

Recently and roughly in temporal order below, much longer-term comparative historical studies of environmental degradation are found by sociologists. There are two general trends: many employ world systems theory—analyzing environmental issues over long periods of time and space; and others employ comparative historical methods. Some utilize both methods simultaneously, sometimes without reference to world systems theory (like Whitaker, see below).

Stephen G. Bunker (d. 2005) and Paul S. Ciccantell collaborated on two books from a world-systems theory view, following commodity chains through history of the modern world system, charting the changing importance of space, time, and scale of extraction and how these variables influenced the shape and location of the main nodes of the world economy over the past 500 years. Their view of the world was grounded in extraction economies and the politics of different states that seek to dominate the world's resources and each other through gaining hegemonic control of major resources or restructuring global flows in them to benefit their locations.

The three volume work of environmental world-systems theory by Sing C. Chew analyzed how "Nature and Culture" interact over long periods of time, starting with World Ecological Degradation (2001) In later books, Chew argued that there were three "Dark Ages" in world environmental history characterized by periods of state collapse and reorientation in the world economy associated with more localist frameworks of community, economy, and identity coming to dominate the nature/culture relationships after state-facilitated environmental destruction delegitimized other forms. Thus recreated communities were founded in these so-called 'Dark Ages,' novel religions were popularized, and perhaps most importantly to him the environment had several centuries to recover from previous destruction. Chew argues that modern green politics and bioregionalism is the start of a similar movement of the present day potentially leading to wholesale system transformation. Therefore, we may be on the edge of yet another global "dark age" which is bright instead of dark on many levels since he argues for human community returning with environmental healing as empires collapse.

More case oriented studies were conducted by historical environmental sociologist Mark D. Whitaker analyzing China, Japan, and Europe over 2,500 years in his book Ecological Revolution (2009). He argued that instead of environmental movements being "New Social Movements" peculiar to current societies, environmental movements are very old—being expressed via religious movements in the past (or in the present like in ecotheology) that begin to focus on material concerns of health, local ecology, and economic protest against state policy and its extractions. He argues past or present is very similar: that we have participated with a tragic common civilizational process of environmental degradation, economic consolidation, and lack of political representation for many millennia which has predictable outcomes. He argues that a form of bioregionalism, the bioregional state, is required to deal with political corruption in present or in past societies connected to environmental degradation.

After looking at the world history of environmental degradation from very different methods, both sociologists Sing Chew and Mark D. Whitaker came to similar conclusions and are proponents of (different forms of) bioregionalism.

== Related journals ==
Among the key journals in this field are:

- Environmental Sociology
- Human Ecology
- Human Ecology Review
- Nature and Culture
- Organization & Environment
- Population and Environment
- Rural Sociology
- Society and Natural Resources

== See also ==
- Bibliography of sociology
- Ecological anthropology
- Ecological design
- Ecological economics
- Ecological modernization theory
- Enactivism
- Environmental design
- Environmental design and planning
- Environmental economics
- Environmental policy
- Environmental racism
- Environmental racism in Europe
- Environmental social science
- Ethnoecology
- Political ecology
- Sociology of architecture
- Sociology of disaster
- Climate change

== Sources ==
- Buttel, Frederick H. (September 2004). "The Treadmill of Production: An Appreciation, Assessment, and Agenda for Research". Organization & Environment. 17 (3): 323–336. Bibcode:2004OrgEn..17..323B. doi:10.1177/1086026604267938. S2CID 58944458.
- Buttel, Frederick H.; Humphrey, Craig R. (2002). "Sociological Theory and the Natural Environment". In Dunlap, Riley E.; Michelson, William (eds.). Handbook of Environmental Sociology. Greenwood Press. pp. 33–69. ISBN 978-0-313-26808-3.
- Diamond, Jared M. (2005). Collapse: How Societies Choose to Fail Or Succeed. Viking. ISBN 978-0-670-03337-9.
- Dunlap, Riley E., Frederick H. Buttel, Peter Dickens, and August Gijswijt (eds.) 2002. Sociological Theory and the Environment: Classical Foundations, Contemporary Insights (Rowman & Littlefield, ISBN 0-7425-0186-8).
- Dunlap, Riley E., and William Michelson (eds.) 2002.Handbook of Environmental Sociology (Greenwood Press, ISBN 0-313-26808-8)
- Freudenburg, William R., and Robert Gramling. 1989. "The Emergence of Environmental Sociology: Contributions of Riley E. Dunlap and William R. Catton, Jr.", Sociological Inquiry 59(4): 439–452
- Harper, Charles. 2004. Environment and Society: Human Perspectives on Environmental Issues. Upper Saddle River, New Jersey: Pearson Education, Inc. ISBN 0-13-111341-0
- Humphrey, Craig R., and Frederick H. Buttel. 1982.Environment, Energy, and Society. Belmont, California: Wadsworth Publishing Company. ISBN 0-534-00964-6
- Humphrey, Craig R., Tammy L. Lewis and Frederick H. Buttel. 2002. Environment, Energy and Society: A New Synthesis. Belmont, California: Wadsworth/Thompson Learning. ISBN 0-534-57955-8
- Lockie, Stewart (3 July 2015). "What is environmental sociology?". Environmental Sociology. 1 (3): 139–142. Bibcode:2015EnvSo...1..139L. doi:10.1080/23251042.2015.1066084. S2CID 145548969.
- Mehta, Michael, and Eric Ouellet. 1995. Environmental Sociology: Theory and Practice, Toronto: Captus Press.
- Redclift, Michael, and Graham Woodgate, eds. 1997.International Handbook of Environmental Sociology (Edgar Elgar, 1997; ISBN 1-84064-243-2)
- Schnaiberg, Allan. 1980. The Environment: From Surplus to Scarcity. New York: Oxford University Press.
