= Metabolic rift =

Marxist conception of capitalist ecological crisis

Metabolic rift is a theory of ecological crisis tendencies under the capitalist mode of production that sociologist John Bellamy Foster ascribes to Karl Marx. Quoting Marx, Foster defines this as the "irreparable rift in the interdependent process of social metabolism". Starting with his book Marx's Ecology: Materialism and Nature, Foster argues that Marx theorized a rupture in the metabolic interaction between humanity and the rest of nature emanating from capitalist agricultural production and the growing division between town and country.

Foster, rather than Marx, coined the term "metabolic rift". Foster argues the theory develops from Marx's earlier work in the Economic and Philosophical Manuscripts on species-being and the relationship between humans and nature. Metabolism is Marx's "mature analysis of the alienation of nature" and presents "a more solid—and scientific—way in which to depict the complex, dynamic interchange between human beings and nature, resulting from human labor."

As opposed to those who have attributed to Marx a disregard for nature and responsibility for the environmental problems of the Soviet Union and other purportedly communist states, Foster sees in the theory of metabolic rift evidence of Marx's ecological perspective. The theory of metabolic rift "enabl[ed] [Marx] to develop a critique of environmental degradation that anticipated much of present-day ecological thought", including questions of sustainability as well as the limits of agricultural production using concentrated animal feeding operations. Researchers building on the original Marxist concept have developed other similar terms like carbon rift.

== Origins ==
=== Soil exhaustion and agricultural revolutions ===
Marx's writings on metabolism were developed during England's "second" agricultural revolution (1815–1880), a period which was characterized by the development of soil chemistry and the growth of the use of chemical fertilizer. The depletion of soil fertility, or "soil exhaustion", had become a key concern for capitalist society, and demand for fertilizer was such that Britain and other powers initiated explicit policies for the importation of bone and guano, including raiding of Napoleonic battlefields and catacombs, British monopolization of Peruvian guano supplies, and, in the United States, "the imperial annexation of any islands thought to be rich in [guano]" through the Guano Islands Act (1856).

=== Liebig and soil science ===
Foster argues that Marx's theory drew heavily on contemporary advances in agricultural chemistry unknown to earlier classical economists such as Ricardo and Malthus. For them, different levels of soil fertility (and thus rent) was attributed "almost entirely to the natural or absolute productivity of the soil," with improvement (or degradation) playing only a minor role.

German agricultural chemist Justus von Liebig, in his Organic Chemistry in Its Applications to Agriculture and Physiology (1840), presented the first convincing explanation of the role of soil nutrients in the growth of plants. In 1842, Liebig expanded the use of the term metabolism (Stoffwechsel), from referring to material exchanges in the body, up to the biochemical processes of natural systems.

Foster argues that Liebig's work became more critical of capitalist agriculture as time went on. From the standpoint of nutrient cycling, the socio-economic relationship between rural and urban areas was self-evidently contradictory, hindering the possibility of sustainability:

If it were practicable to collect, with the least loss, all the solid and fluid excrements of the inhabitants of the town, and return to each farmer the portion arising from produce originally supplied by him to the town, the productiveness of the land might be maintained almost unimpaired for ages to come, and the existing store of mineral elements in every fertile field would be amply sufficient for the wants of increasing populations.

=== Human labor and nature ===
Marx rooted his theory of social-ecological metabolism in Liebig's analysis but connected it to his understanding of the labor process. Marx understood that, throughout history, it was through labor that humans appropriated nature to satisfy their needs. Thus the metabolism, or interaction, of society with nature is "a universal and perpetual condition."

In Capital, Marx integrated his materialist conception of nature with his materialist conception of history. Fertility, Marx argued, was not a natural quality of the soil, but was rather bound up with the social relations of the time. By conceptualizing the complex, interdependent processes of material exchange and regulatory actions that link human society with non-human nature as "metabolic relations," Marx allowed these processes to be both "nature-imposed conditions" and subject to human agency, a dynamic largely missed, according to Foster, by the reduction of ecological questions to issues of value.

== Writers since Marx ==
The central contribution of the metabolic rift perspective is to locate socio-ecological contradictions internal to the development of capitalism. Later socialists expanded upon Marx's ideas, including Nikolai Bukharin in Historical Materialism (1921) and Karl Kautsky in The Agrarian Question (1899), which developed questions of the exploitation of the countryside by the town and the "fertilizer treadmill" that resulted from metabolic rift.

Contemporary eco-socialist theorists aside from Foster have also explored these directions, including James O'Connor, who sees capitalist undervaluing of nature as leading to economic crisis, what he refers to as the second contradiction of capitalism.

Scholars from a variety of disciplines have drawn on Marx's metabolic approach and the concept of metabolic rift in analyzing the relation of society to the rest of nature. With increasing amounts of carbon dioxide being released into the environment from capitalist production, the theory of a carbon rift has also emerged.

The metabolic rift is characterized in different ways by historical materialists. For Jason W. Moore, the distinction between social and natural systems is empirically false and theoretically arbitrary; following a different reading of Marx, Moore views metabolisms as relations of human and extra-human natures. In this view, capitalism's metabolic rift unfolds through the town-country division of labor, itself a "bundle" of relations between humans and the rest of nature. Moore sees it as constitutive of the endless accumulation of capital. Moore's perspective, although also rooted in historical materialism, produces a widely divergent view from that of Foster and others about what makes ecological crisis and how it relates to capital accumulation.

Nine months after Foster's groundbreaking article appeared, Moore argued that the origins of the metabolic rift were not found in the 19th century but in the rise of capitalism during the "long" 16th century. The metabolic rift was not a consequence of industrial agriculture but capitalist relations pivoting on the law of value. Moore consequently focuses attention on the grand movements of primitive accumulation, colonialism, and the globalization of town-country relations that characterized early modern capitalism. There were, in this view, not one but many metabolic rifts; every great phase of capitalist development organized nature in new ways, each one with its own metabolic rift. In place of agricultural revolutions, Moore emphasizes recurrent agro-ecological revolutions, assigned the historical task of providing cheap food and cheap labor, in the history of capitalism, an interpretation that extends the analysis to the food crises of the early 21st century.

== Environmental contradiction under capitalism ==
=== Town and country ===
Up until the 16th or 17th century, cities' metabolic dependency upon surrounding countryside (for resources, etc.), coupled with the technological limitations to production and extraction, prevented extensive urbanization. Early urban centers were bioregionally defined, and had relatively light "footprints," recycling city nightsoils back into the surrounding areas.

However, with the rise of capitalism, cities expanded in size and population. Large-scale industry required factories, raw material, workers, and large amounts of food. As urban economic security was dependent upon its metabolic support system, cities now looked further afield for their resource and waste flows. As spatial barriers were broken down, capitalist society "violated" what were previously "nature-imposed conditions of sustainability."

With trade and expansion, food and fiber were shipped longer distances. The nutrients of the soil were sent to cities in the form of agricultural produce, but these same nutrients, in the form of human and animal waste, were not returned to the land. Thus there was a one-way movement, a "robbing of the soil" in order to maintain the socio-economic reproduction of society.

Marx thus linked the crisis of pollution in cities with the crisis of soil depletion. The rift was a result of the antagonistic separation of town and country, and the social-ecological relations of production created by capitalism were ultimately unsustainable. From Capital, volume 1, on "Large-scale Industry and Agriculture":

Capitalist production collects the population together in great centres, and causes the urban population to achieve an ever-growing preponderance. This has two results. On the one hand it concentrates the historical motive force of society; on the other hand, it disturbs the metabolic interaction between man and the earth, i.e. it prevents the return to the soil of its constituent elements consumed by man in the form of food and clothing; hence it hinders the operation of the eternal natural condition for the lasting fertility of the soil... But by destroying the circumstances surrounding that metabolism... it compels its systematic restoration as a regulative law of social production, and in a form adequate to the full development of the human race... All progress in capitalist agriculture is a progress in the art, not only of robbing the worker, but of robbing the soil; all progress in increasing the fertility of the soil for a given time is a progress toward ruining the more long-lasting sources of that fertility... Capitalist production, therefore, only develops the techniques and the degree of combination of the social process of production by simultaneously undermining the original sources of all wealth—the soil and the worker (emphasis added).

=== Future socialist society ===
The concept of metabolic rift captures "the material estrangement of human beings within capitalist society from the natural conditions which formed the basis for their existence." However, Marx also emphasizes the importance of historical change. It was both necessary and possible to rationally govern human metabolism with nature, but this was something "completely beyond the capabilities of bourgeois society." In a future society of freely associated producers, however, humans could govern their relations with nature via collective control, rather than through the blind power of market relations. In Capital, volume 3, Marx states:

Freedom, in this sphere...can consist only in this, that socialized man, the associated producers, govern the human metabolism with nature in a rational way, bringing it under their own collective control rather than being dominated by it as a blind power; accomplishing it with the least expenditure of energy and in conditions most worthy and appropriate for their human nature.

However, Marx did not argue that a sustainable relation to the Earth was an automatic result of the transition to socialism. Rather, there was a need for planning and measures to address the division of labor and population between town and country and for the restoration and improvement of the soil.

== Metabolism and environmental governance ==
Despite Marx's assertion that a concept of ecological sustainability was "of very limited practical relevance to capitalist society," as it was incapable of applying rational scientific methods and social planning due to the pressures of competition, the theory of metabolic rift may be seen as relevant to, if not explicitly invoked in, many contemporary debates and policy directions of environmental governance.

There is a rapidly growing body of literature on social-ecological metabolism. While originally limited to questions of soil fertility—essentially a critique of capitalist agriculture—the concept of metabolic rift has since been taken up in numerous fields and its scope expanded. For example, Clausen and Clark have extended the use of metabolic rift to marine ecology, while Moore uses the concept to discuss the broader concerns of global environmental crises and the viability of capitalism itself. Fischer-Kowalski discusses the application of "the biological concept of metabolism to social systems," tracing it through several contributing scientific traditions, including biology, ecology, social theory, cultural anthropology, and social geography. A social metabolism approach has become "one of the most important paradigms for the empirical analysis of the society-nature-interaction across various disciplines," particularly in the fields of industrial metabolism and material flow analysis.

=== Urban political ecology ===
David Harvey points out that much of the environmental movement has held (and in some areas continues to hold) a profound anti-urban sentiment, seeing cities as "the highpoint of plundering and pollution of all that is good and holy on planet earth." The problem is that such a perspective focuses solely on a particular form of nature, ignoring many people's lived experience of the environment and the importance of cities in ecological processes and as ecological sites in their own right.

In contrast, Erik Swyngedouw and other theorists have conceptualized the city as an ecological space through urban political ecology, which connects material flows within cities and between the urban and non-urban.

=== Sustainable cities ===
In city planning policy circles, there has been a recent movement toward urban sustainability. Hodson and Marvin discuss a "new eco-urbanism" that seeks to integrate environment and infrastructure, "bundling" architecture, ecology and technology in order to "internalize" energy, water, food, waste and other material flows. Unlike previous efforts to integrate nature into the city, which, according to Harvey, were primarily aesthetic and bourgeois in nature, these new efforts are taking place in the context of climate change, resource constraints and the threat of environmental crises.

In contrast to the traditional approach of capitalist urbanization, which sought more and more distant sources for material resources and waste sinks (as seen in the history of Los Angeles water), eco-urban sites would re-internalize their own resources and re-circulate wastes. The goal is autarky and greater ecological and infrastructural self-reliance through "closed-loop systems" that reduce reliance on external networks. Although difficult given the reliance on international supply chains, urban food movements are working to reduce the commodification of food and individual and social forms of alienation from food within cities. This takes place within actually existing conditions of neoliberalization, suggesting that healing metabolic rifts will be a process that requires both social and ecological transformations.

However, critics link these efforts to "managerial environmentalism," and worry that eco-urbanism too closely falls into an "urban ecological security" approach, echoing Mike Davis' analysis of securitization and fortress urbanism. A Marxist critique might also question the feasibility of sustainable cities within the context of a global capitalist system.

== See also ==
- Bioregionalism
- Carbon rift
- Critique of political economy
- Eco-socialism
- Environmental sociology
- History of soil science
- Industrial ecology
- Socio-ecological system
- Industrial metabolism
- Permaculture
- Political ecology
- Sustainability
- Urban sustainability
- Nature–culture divide
- David Harvey
