= Brett Clark (sociologist) =

American sociologist

Academic background
- Education: Colorado State University; University of Oregon

Academic work
- Discipline: Sociology
- Institutions: North Carolina State University; University of Utah

Brett Clark is an American sociologist working as a professor of sociology at the University of Utah. From 2008 to 2012, he was an assistant professor at North Carolina State University. His areas of interest are ecology, political economy and science.

== Career ==
He is the author of several books, including The Science and Humanism of Stephen Jay Gould (with Richard York), The Ecological Rift: Capitalism's War on the Earth (with John Bellamy Foster and Richard York), and Critique of Intelligent Design: Materialism Versus Creationism from Antiquity to the Present (with John Bellamy Foster and Richard York).

He has published articles in the American Journal of Sociology, Social Problems, Social Science Research, Theory and Society, Sociological Inquiry, The Sociological Quarterly, Organization & Environment, Population & Environment, Global Environmental Politics, Urban Studies, Journal of Agrarian Change, Society & Natural Resources, International Journal of Comparative Sociology, Nature & Culture, Monthly Review, and other scholarly publications.

He received the 2007 Outstanding Publication Award from the Environment and Technology Section of the American Sociological Association for a series of articles published with Richard York.

He was a member of the Editorial Board for Journal of World-Systems Research.

== See also ==
- Monthly Review
