= Small Business Act for Europe =

Package of measures to assist EU small businesses

The Small Business Act for Europe (SBA) is a package of principles put forward by the European Commission in 2008, designed to assist small businesses within the European Union (EU). The package contains ten "guiding principles intended for adoption "at the highest political level" across the EU. It is not a legislative act as such.

== Background ==
In June 2008, the Commission adopted a communiqué entitled "Small Business Act" for Europe to the European Council, European Parliament, European Economic and Social Committee, and the Committee of the Regions. Its aim was to provide a policy framework covering small and medium-sized enterprises (SMEs) which could improve competitiveness and promote entrepreneurship. Rather than being a legislative act, it contains provisions applying to small firms, directed at governments and institutions to "think small first" when establishing policy and law.

== Content ==
The SBA invites the Commission and EU Member States to adopt:

- ten "guiding principles" to guide policy-making
- legislative proposals guided by the "think small first" principle: the General Block Exemption Regulation on state aids, a regulation providing for a statute on the European Private Company, amendments to rules on late payment, and a proposed directive reducing VAT rates for locally supplied services
- policy measures to implement the ten principles at the Community and Member State levels.

The act is intended to benefit independent companies with fewer than 250 employees (99% of EU businesses). It provides an "SME test" to ensure SMEs are taken into account at an early stage of the policy-making process. As such, all new administrative or legislative proposals are to be subjected to an SME impact review. Countries including Belgium, Finland, Denmark, and Germany have added this test into their national decision-making processes. The Act also carries a provision to appoint SME envoys, whose role is to liaise between the EC and SMEs. The SBA promotes the Erasmus for Young Entrepreneurs program (participants spend up to six months working in a different country's SME), and creates Market Access Teams in select export markets, particularly China and India. The "Code of Best Practices" published in 2008 aimed to show how EU member states could make SME-friendly use of the provisions of the public procurement directives when awarding contracts. The "Best Practices" document noted that consultation regarding its contents had shown that changes in the procurement "culture" were more important than legislative changes in promoting better SME access to public sector business opportunities.

== See also ==
- European Economic Recovery Plan
