= System of National Accounts =

International standard system

The System of National Accounts or SNA (until 1993 known as the United Nations System of National Accounts or UNSNA) is an international standard system of concepts and methods for compiling national accounts. The system is nowadays used by almost all countries in the world. SNA-type national accounts are among the world's most important sources of macroeconomic statistics. They provide essential data for empirical macroeconomic models and economic forecasting.

When governments use SNA standards to guide the construction of their country's national accounts, it results in much better data quality and data comparability (between countries and across time). In turn, that helps to form more accurate judgements about economic situations, and to put economic issues in correct proportion — nationally and internationally.

The first international standard was published by the United Nations in 1953. Additions and revisions were published in 1960, 1964, 1968, 1993 and 2008. After five years of work, including global consultation with a thousand experts, the pre-edit version for the SNA 2025 revision was adopted by the United Nations Statistical Commission at its 56th Session in March 2025, together with the new Balance of Payments and International Investment Position Manual ("BPM7"). The finalized version of SNA 2025 will be published in 2026, and will be made available in all six official UN languages (Arabic, Chinese, English, French, Russian and Spanish). Behind the accounts system, there is also a system of people: the people who are cooperating around the world to produce the statistics, for use by government and international agencies, businesspeople, media, academics, political parties and interest groups from all nations.

SNA guidelines have now been adopted in more than 200 separate countries, territories and areas, although in many cases with some adaptations for local circumstances. Whenever people in the world are using macroeconomic data, they are most often using information sourced (partly or completely) from SNA-type accounts or from economic data sets "strongly influenced" by SNA concepts, designs, data and classifications. Economists and officials across the world depend on timely SNA data, to monitor economic activity, evaluate policy options, and make strategic decisions.

== Organizational approach ==
Since 1953, the United Nations and its partner organizations have always encouraged national statistics offices ("NSO's") to apply SNA standards. However, using SNA guidelines to compile national accounts is voluntary and not mandatory. What countries are able to do, will depend on available capacity, local priorities, and the existing state of statistical development. Government agencies usually determine their own policies for economic statistics, within the framework of local laws. However, cooperation with SNA has many advantages in terms of data comparability and data quality, gaining access to data, exchange of data, data dissemination, cost-saving, technical support, and scientific advice for data production. Most countries see the advantages, and are willing to participate. Moreover, if reliable and up-to-date SNA macroeconomic data is not available, this could hinder the financial strategies of governments.

The SNA-based European System of Accounts (ESA) is an exceptional case, because using ESA standards is compulsory for all member states of the European Union. This legal requirement for uniform accounting standards exists primarily because of mutual financial claims and obligations by member governments and central EU organizations. Another exception is North Korea (the DPRK). North Korea is a member of the United Nations since 1991, but does not use SNA as a framework for its economic data production. Although North Korea's Central Bureau of Statistics does traditionally produce economic statistics, using a modified version of the Material Product System, its macroeconomic data area are nowadays not (or very rarely) published for general release. UNDP and the Bank of Korea produce a few estimates; the validity of the Bank of Korea estimates has been disputed.

The global grid of the SNA social accounting system continues to develop and expand, and is coordinated by five international organizations: United Nations Statistics Division, the International Monetary Fund, the World Bank, the Organisation for Economic Co-operation and Development, and Eurostat. The European Commission is also involved, via membership of the Intersecretariat Working Group on National Accounts (ISWGNA) set up by the United Nations Statistical Commission (UNSC) to promote cooperation between statistical agencies worldwide. The ISWGNA is assisted by the Advisory Expert Group (AEG). Revisions of the SNA national accounts system are centrally coordinated by the ISWGNA which has its own website, hosted by the United Nations Statistics Division.

There are also other UN organizations which contribute to SNA development, in specific areas. For example, UN regional commissions can assist with SNA capacity building, technical/scientific advice and accounts design (discussed below). The United Nations Conference on Trade and Development (UNCTAD) and The United Nations Office on Drugs and Crime (UNODC) created a conceptual framework for measuring illicit financial flows (IFF's) which is consistent with SNA concepts. The UNECE Statistical Division is pioneering the use of artificial intelligence in UN statistical operations. The United Nations inter-agency forum called Committee for the Coordination of Statistical Activities (CCSA) brings together international and supranational organisations whose mandate includes the provision of statistics. The CCSA promotes inter-agency coordination and cooperation on statistical programmes, and consistency in statistical practices and development across the world.

All these organizations (and other related organizations) have a vital interest in internationally comparable economic statistics, based on data sets supplied regularly by NSO's. For this reason, they promote the international standardization of classifications, and increasing the compatibility of different statistical systems. They play an active role in the publication of international statistics for data users worldwide. The SNA accounts are "building blocks" for many more macroeconomic data sets which combine SNA data with data from other sources.

== History and actuality ==
The historical origins of accounting practice are debated by scholars. It all began with the invention of counting systems (see also history of mathematics). Accounting already occurred millennia ago in the ancient Near East. In Europe, double-entry business accounting was practiced in Northern Italy circa 1300 AD. Similar sorts of accounting techniques were also developed independently in China, India, Iran and Arab countries. At the dawn of the modern era in Europe, accounting referred to 'reckoning for money paid, received or held in trust and presenting a formal account of it'. The English category of an "accounting officer" in the sense of a "professional maker of accounts" emerged in the 1530s. When government administration systems became more sophisticated, when currency was more widely used, and population census data began to be collected, the idea arose of applying accounting techniques to the national economy.

=== The first national accounts ===
The first attempts at national accounting by individual researchers in Europe, from the 17th century through the 19th century, aimed mainly to estimate national income and national wealth. The first known attempt in England was by William Petty, in 1665. Petty tried to work out how best to spread the tax burden caused by government spending on the second Anglo-Dutch War (1665–1667). For this purpose, he estimated the income and capital of England. The new science was often called "political arithmetick" (a term invented by Petty) – it aimed to calculate what the best policies would be for the state and the country, with recognition of different economic, social and political interests at stake. The first known estimate of "value-added" in England was created by Arthur Young around 1770, in a production account for agriculture. Young also created a national income estimate for England.

=== International associations ===
At first individual researchers in different countries followed their own approach, sometimes borrowing ideas from each other. In the 1830s–1850s, "statistical offices" and national "statistical societies" were founded in Europe and America. In the mid-19th century, the idea arose of "organized contacts between the statisticians of different countries, although informal contacts occurred earlier". In those days, the name "statistics" referred mainly to "matters of state", and British statisticians were often called "statists".

Adolphe Quetelet was the driving force behind the First International Statistical Congress held at Brussels in September 1853, and more congresses followed. An International Statistical Institute was founded in 1885. Subsequently (and especially from the 1930s onward) interventionist governments began to organize much more statistical research, and used national income & wealth estimates to inform their fiscal, social and economic policies.

The production of "official statistics" was often delegated as a specialized service to separate statistical authorities, bureaus or institutes which had considerable scientific autonomy, partly to safeguard the objectivity and scientific integrity of data reports. In some countries, the production of national accounts is highly centralized in one office or organization, while in other countries the process is decentralized and different government organizations contribute different parts of the accounts. The organizational approach taken in different countries is usually influenced by the prevailing legal frameworks for government activities, the existing structure of government institutions, and the size of the country.

=== The first official estimates ===
The first official government estimates of national income were made in Australia (1886), Canada (1925), Soviet Russia (1925), Germany (1929), Netherlands (1931), New Zealand (1931), United States (1934), Turkey (1935), Yugoslavia (1937) and Switzerland (1939). In Britain, the Central Statistics Office established in 1941 created the first official white papers with annual estimates of national income and expenditure, which subsequently became a standard feature of the Blue Book. In the United States, a national accounting system was in development after a report to the US Senate in 1934, based on initial studies of US national income. The first complete set of official US national income and product accounts, for the years 1929–1946 (in 48 tables), was published in July 1947. During the reconstruction era after World War 2, more and more countries began to publish annual official estimates of gross national product and national income, usually following SNA guidelines.

=== The first global standards ===
A recommendation for a global standard system for national accounts was first tabled at the League of Nations in 1928. At its eighth session held in April 1939, the League of Nations Committee of Statistical Experts officially decided to create global standards for national accounts. Standards for banking accounts and balance of payments accounts were also to be created. However, the activities of the Committee were interrupted by World War 2 (1939–1945). The preparatory work resumed at its Princeton conference in December 1945. The approach that the United Nations subsequently took was "no radical innovation, but a logical development of recent investigations in the field of national income".

The first global national accounts standard, SNA 1953, was an initiative of the United Nations Statistical Commission. The United Nations believed that the creation of internationally comparable economic data was essential for its own work, and that such data would also serve many other policymaking needs of government and intergovernmental agencies. UNSD provides a useful overview and summary of the historical evolution of SNA across the last eight decades, with supporting documentation.

=== Global expansion of national accounting ===
Nowadays, the role of the state in the economy has become much larger (see also Wagner's Law). As a corollary, the standard national accounts have become much more sophisticated and comprehensive. The first SNA manual in 1953 was 46 pages long, but SNA 2025 has more than a thousand pages (not including supporting handbooks and other methodological documents).

- The aim is now to account systematically for almost everything that happens in the national economy, plus its external transactions.
- This has to be done in a way that both follows standard recording principles and measurement criteria, and satisfies the data needs of a much wider group of data users.
- These data users are not just governments or international and intergovernmental organizations, but also corporations, business people, academics, NGOs, thinktanks, research institutes, interest groups and political parties, media organizations and individual researchers.
- The global rollout of SNA is no longer the task of the United Nations only. It is shared with other intergovernmental organizations, each of which has its own area of expertise (principally the IMF, OECD, World Bank and Eurostat).
- Regional SNA advisory organizations and individual experts are also involved in SNA implementation and development.
- In the modern world, national accounts data has become essential for macroeconomic forecasting; decision making on monetary policy; state subsidies and debt management; fiscal policy and fiscal surveillance; government policy analysis in many other areas; macroeconomic research and sector studies; and academic, business and investor research about all kinds of economic trends.
- Globalization has greatly increased demand for detailed economic data on international transactions and trade, international investments, and international comparisons of economies.

All of this means that comprehensive and detailed data is nowadays produced for "which types of economic actors do what, with whom, in exchange for what, by what means and rights, for what economic purpose, and how this changes the financial position of the national economy (or parts of it)". To create comparable data for all countries, requires a conceptually rigorous, logically consistent accounting system, and standardized measurement practices. SNA provides that unitary framework, for the whole world.

=== Long-run economic data series ===
The Penn World Tables and the Maddison Project provide long-run historical time series for SNA-based gross product, national income and capital formation statistics, covering most countries in the world. This data is used by economists, econometrists and economic historians for statistical comparisons and trend analysis across long intervals of time.

=== National accounting journals ===
The flagship academic journal for research on national accounts is the online Review of Income and Wealth, published since 1951 by the International Association for Research in Income and Wealth. Other journals include, for example, the Journal of Income and Wealth, the National Accounting Review, Journal of Economic Perspectives, Survey of Current BusinessSurvey of Current Business (SCB), and the Review of Economics and Statistics.

== The SNA framework ==
Broadly, the SNA framework consists of a series of standards which guide the production of national accounts, including:

1. Social accounting concepts and methods.
2. Macroeconomic concepts and theories.
3. Statistical measurement and aggregation methods.
4. Terminology standards and glossaries.
5. Classification and categorization systems.
6. Information design principles for the accounts.
7. Relevant laws, regulations, agreements, obligations and official rules/procedures governing SNA data production.

The framework standards guide SNA data producers about what to do, how to do it, and why it should be done in a specific way. There is often room for some flexibility of interpretation, but if the standard is accepted, then data have to be produced in line with the standard. This article outlines the main points of the SNA framework; the official SNA manuals (and associated technical handbooks with measurement guidelines) provide in-depth and detailed coverage.

=== Work process ===
To compile an entry in an SNA account, basic logical steps are: accounting goal → economic concept → accounting rules → appropriate statistical measurement concept → measurement technique → data collection → data collation, registration and storage → data calculation/estimation → data result (a statistic) → data vetting/testing → data approval → inclusion in the new accounts table(s) → data publication. In reality, however, the sequence of the data production process may not be so linear and straightforward. There may be a long way to go from "a general economic measuring idea" to "a precisely defined measurement technique" that yields the correct empirical estimate for an economic concept.

- There may be lot of information to assemble and collate, at different stages of the work.
- Considerable methodological discussion may occur in different phases before the decision is made to use an estimate for the official accounts.
- There are often many different rules and guidelines to follow, at different levels of abstraction.
- One accounting entry may be derived from other accounting entries, or it has to fit exactly with other accounting entries.
- Organizationally, different departments or separate institutes may each create different parts of the national accounts, which are then integrated by a core group of statisticians, accountants and economists.

=== Components ===
In practice, the SNA framework used by NSO national accounts statisticians has the following main components:

1. Calendars, scripts, planning agenda's and deadlines for the annual and quarterly publication cycles of SNA data, and for statistical development projects.
2. Required economic observations, records, documentary information and other data, collected from a variety of sources.
3. Survey instruments (including questionnaires, sampling frames, data collection and data coding systems, data compilation methods and econometric models).
4. Coding, categorization and classification systems for observations and data sets.
5. Purpose-built secure data storage and information storage systems which include a library collection of manuals, handbooks, and other technical documentation; an archive; networked databases; and data warehouses.
6. A legal framework and NSO protocols for the process of SNA data production, publication, and dissemination.
7. National registers of records for institutional units, sectors and sub-sectors defined by institutional type, location, and type of economic activity (and other characteristics).
8. A set of logically related economic processes, concepts, equations and categories, for which empirical measures are produced (presented in the SNA manual, and adapted to local conditions).
9. Price and volume indexation methods and rules, and a portfolio of indexes which are continuously updated (for the purpose of uniform valuation and estimation).
10. Operational definitions of accounting terms, accounting concepts, account equations, account derivation principles and standard accounting procedures.
11. Specific accounting and recording rules for timing, valuation, grossing/netting and consolidation of stocks and flows.
12. Specific statistical aggregation rules and inclusion/exclusion rules.
13. Specific measuring techniques, data calculation methods and estimation methodologies for a great variety of data sets.
14. Specifications of national standards for the structure and content of core accounts, and supplementary accounts.
15. Information design specifications for national accounts formats, texts, layouts and publishing.
16. A procedure for allocating data entries/lines to the finalized accounts tables.
17. Administrative systems for storing finalized economic statistics, and for the publication of data series (the finished products, which can also be used to derive/create other statistics).
18. Methods, procedures and econometric models for testing/checking data quality, data reliability, and data revision effects.
19. Administrative systems for providing access to data collections online and offline, and for sending/receiving statistical information internationally.
20. Systems for outreach, advocacy, training and knowledge-sharing about SNA theory and practice.

All these aspects have to be identified, decided on, approved and documented by the national accounts team and the NSO management, as the official methodology. The NSO has to be able to "account for the accounts", i.e. what was done, how it was done, why it was done, where it was done, and who did it. In principle, it must be possible to track down the whole data production process for every part of the accounts, from beginning to end. One of the reasons is, that if there is a data change, gap or error, it must be clarified what exactly the effect or implication is of that issue for other, related data.

The SNA concepts form a logically consistent system. SNA categorization is conceptually coherent, mathematically rigorous and testable. However, in practice SNA is not exactly 100% consistent, for several reasons:

1. Occasionally a logical incompatibility problem or paradox occurs where one categorization conflicts with another categorization.
2. Statistical discrepancies may occur between different approaches to estimating a stock value or a flow value.
3. Boundary problems can occur, because the relevant items that have to be counted do not fit exactly with an accounting concept, or because the conceptual boundaries of a category are difficult to apply empirically.
4. There can also be interpretation disputes about how the accounting definitions should be applied in specific cases.
5. In principle, a variable or category should be measured in the same way (using the same method) year after year, but if this is not possible in practice for some reason, data distortions can occur that have to be resolved in some way.
6. It can happen sometimes that there are missing data, creating data gaps for which estimates may have to be extrapolated.

In a double-entry accounting system, for every recorded expenditure/payment there exists in principle always a recorded revenue/income or receipt (and vice versa), for every recorded debit there is a recorded credit (and vice versa), and for every record of a withdrawal there exists a record for an deposit. This enables checks and controls for the accuracy and reliability of the estimates. In the case of Balance of Payments data, the international transactions are usually measured both by the sending country and the receiving country, enabling reliability checks of the data sets. In principle, each line-item in the core accounts, whether a large or small aggregate, can be derived by adding/subtracting other items in the accounts and/or via standard equations, and the tallies can be verified exactly.

If a change is introduced in one part of the system, it can have consequences for other parts of the system, and lead to revisions of the estimates. For example, in December 2024 the National Bureau of Statistics of China (NBS) stated that it had revised the 2023 estimate for the value of GDP by +2.7%, after taking into account the results of the 5th national economic census and a change in the method for calculating housing services of urban residents (the impact on the reported economic growth rate for China in 2024 was rather small). In Europe, the ESA 2010 implementation and the introduction of other statistical improvements had the effect of raising the level of EU-28 gross domestic product (GDP) by 3.7% in 2010.

=== SNA data sources ===
National accounts are integrated, composite statistical systems. They bring together raw data, calculated data, estimated data and ready-made statistics using a great variety of sources. Hundreds of separate data sources may be used for a complete set of annual national accounts, depending on the size and complexity of the country's economy. The source of the data could be a survey, a publication, a government agency, a business agency or institution, an econometric model, or an unofficial source etc. Some of the data sets are fully produced by the national statistics agency itself, some data is imported readymade from other agencies, and some data is obtained from elsewhere but reworked for use in SNA accounts.

National accountants often act as "statistical engineers", who reconcile thousands of inconsistencies between different sources, to obtain valid estimates which conform to national accounting standards. An economic "map" is created for all measured transactions in the national economy. In this map, all stocks and flows are allocated and categorized according to SNA rules. For every entry in the SNA accounts, the appropriate measurement methodology is defined by statisticians, consistent with the applicable SNA manual and SNA handbooks.

In principle, there is a place in SNA for almost every type of transaction in the economy. However, some things that happen in the economy are not measured in SNA accounts. That is either because they are conceptually excluded from the SNA framework, or because it is practically difficult to estimate them accurately (for example, specific changes occurring within an accounting interval, or changes completed across several accounting intervals; the sales and purchases of specific types of used goods; illegal and informal transactions).

SNA statisticians get the data and information they need to compile the national accounts from ten types of possible data sources:

1. Direct surveys of business units, non-commercial units, household units, and consumer units, or special sector-specific sample surveys. These direct surveys are often sample surveys for specific areas and sectors in the economy (for example, labour force surveys and household income & expenditure surveys) which are generalized to the whole economy, using a sampling frame and a geostatistical database for the survey population, and mathematical models. Some direct surveys are taken exclusively for the purpose of compiling national accounts, but the national accounts statisticians also use relevant data from other surveys which are not specifically carried out only for national accounts purposes.
2. Census data obtained from general population censuses, economic censuses, agricultural censuses and specific housing & dwelling censuses. Normally a "census" involves surveying all the units within the survey population, not just a sample of them. A national population census is normally taken every five or ten years (sometimes this is temporarily not possible, because of crises, wars or disasters).
3. Administrative data. This includes corporate records, company records, institutional records, personal income records and value-added tax records; inventory data; social security contributions and pension records; bookkeeping records and company registers; land and property registers; financial reports of companies and institutions; customs records of imports and exports; licensing databases; and employment registers.
4. Government financial statistics: data on government incomes and spending, government assets and liabilities, credits/debits and government taxes and levies. This information can be obtained from central government, state government, provincial government, district government and local government authorities. Included are the general government accounts, budget allocation and expenditure reports, and expenditures on specific items (for example, defence and education). Sometimes relevant data is also obtained from intergovernmental organizations.
5. Central bank, corporate bank and financial institution statistics, including balance sheet data; data on bank loans, deposits and interest paid/earned; insurance and pension fund reports; data on stocks, bonds, derivatives and other asset transactions; and data on various other financial markets and types of financial intermediation. In some cases, private research institutes can provide relevant information.
6. Satellite data (external data) imported from other statistical agencies for use in standardized SNA satellite accounts (for example tourism, health, education, labour utilization, environmental conditions etc.). This material can be supplied to SNA ready-made, or it can be adjusted somewhat for alignment with SNA standards.
7. Econometric models which estimate the value for particular accounting items using observed trends in related contemporaneous data which are already available. Models are not only used for sample surveys. They are also used to extrapolate data sets which are too costly, impractical or impossible to obtain from an alternative source. Models are also useful to test the reliability of the data series that are produced. Quarterly economic data is often obtained with the aid of mathematical models plus leading empirical indicators and data series that can reliably predict the quarterly trends.
8. Price indexes, including price and volume indexes for traded goods and services; consumer price indexes; producer price indexes for inputs and outputs; capital expenditure indexes; asset price indexes; export and import price indexes; real estate and construction cost indexes. An NSO in the larger countries typically uses hundreds of indexes. Most price indexes which are used are normally produced by the NSO itself, but in some cases, they can be produced by other government agencies, by research institutions, or by foreign agencies. They are crucial for the accurate estimation and uniform valuation of entries in the national accounts.
9. Online data sources. Increasingly, NSO's make use of publicly accessible online data and databases maintained by private sector organizations, as a source of data. Examples are web-sourced information on retail prices and retail volumes, bank transactions data, tourism data, mobile phone data and transport/mobility data. Different government agencies also share or exchange information from their digitalized administrative databases. Using this approach, questionnaire surveys and sample surveys may not be needed anymore, and downloading raw data can be a cheaper, reliable alternative to carrying out a statistical survey to capture the necessary data.
10. International sources: information is obtained from government agencies in other countries, for export and import statistics, balance of payments statistics, international trade in services statistics, tax and pension treaty statistics, foreign income & remittances, and foreign direct investment statistics.

SNA statisticians can refer to all kinds of national and international documentation, including scientific or other academic literature and news stories. But they cannot collect data from just any source at will. Much of the detailed source data used to produce economic statistics is confidential, classified or secret information (for privacy, military, official and business reasons). In the private sector, there are trade secrets and in the public sector there is classified information. Access and use rights for this information require special authorization. Normally only the anonymized aggregates derived from the detailed base data are accessible and published in the accounts (many more tables and accounts are produced by national accounts research staff which are not accessible to the general public, or which are not officially published).

Normally there exist national or federative legal frameworks for the collection and publication of all official statistical data (not just SNA data), which defines (1) the obligations to supply and collect data, (2) legitimate use of data, (3) protection of data, (4) privacy rights and (5) rules for the release of data. The NSO must specify "under whose authority" the information is collected, and "for what purpose". National accounts data can only be collected if it is really necessary to produce the national accounts. In this way, the response burden is kept within acceptable bounds for data suppliers, unnecessary costs are avoided, and there is less chance of response error, data sabotage or non-compliance with information requests (see, for example, the 1980 Paperwork Reduction Act of the United States).

An important reason why some types of information are traditionally not collected, is simply because there is resistance to supplying it and a lack of trust. Sometimes the data is practically difficult to obtain. Ultimately SNA statistical research cannot be done successfully, if people do not or cannot cooperate with information requests. Different countries have different laws, but usually there are norms and rules for relevant data collection. A lot of thought goes into finding the best ways to approach individuals and organizations with information requests, so that the response rate is high, the response burden is low, response errors and response bias are low, and response quality is high.

=== From observables to estimates for SNA stock values and flow values ===
The observables about the national economy which are the basis for SNA accounts concern the recorded activities of buying and selling; owning, paying and renting; lending and borrowing; disbursing, receiving, depositing and saving; leasing and hiring; financial gains and losses; insuring, charging, taxing and levying; and various other types of financial claims and counter-claims. These economic observables can be identified, allocated and grouped for accounting purposes using six general sorting criteria:

1. The type of economic activities involving flows of money, goods and services which create, transform, exchange, transfer or destroy (extinguish) economic value, or which change the value, volume or composition of assets and liabilities. The question here is: what type of economic action is this?
2. The human purposes for the actions, behaviors and functions of transactors involved in transactions. A transaction is defined as an interaction between separate institutional units which occurs by mutual agreement or through the operation of law, and involves either an exchange of value or a transfer of value. The question is: what is the aim or function of the transaction or group of transactions?
3. The context, location or setting of the transactions or assets/liabilities. Where or under whose authority does a transaction occur, or how does an ownership title/claim arise and change?
4. The type of transaction records expressed as money prices or physical volumes (sales, purchases, transfers, incomes & expenditures, and other payments, whether in cash, on credit or in kind). What and where is the registered price data required to estimate an SNA category?
5. The type of ownership records for, and changes of, all kinds of asset holdings, liabilities, debts, deposits and financial claims owned by persons and by organizations. What and where is the registered ownership data required to estimate an SNA category?
6. The effects of economic activity (impacts or consequences) What can observable and quantifiable economic effects tell us about the magnitudes of economic variables and accounting categories? For example, the data about a natural disaster can help to estimate the value of capital losses for the country.

Using information about these six criteria, plus SNA accounting rules, and a lot of economic/legal/administrative knowledge, statisticians categorize, group, adjust, aggregate, disaggregate and reaggregate all the observables into a large set of stock values and flow values. These stocks and flows are the basic units of all the accounts in the SNA system. Each line item in the SNA core accounts is either a stock value, or a flow value. Each item can increase in value, stay constant or decrease across time, so that the trend can be measured. There are three noteworthy exceptions:

1. Some non-observed items are also included in the accounts, which are stock or flow values derived from observables by estimation, imputation, inference, interpolation, adjustment or extrapolation.
2. Some financial account entries are not called "stocks" or "flows" of value, but positions; a position refers to the situation of assets and liabilities held at a specific point in time. This occurs for example in balance sheet accounts and external transactions accounts (Balance of Payments accounts, foreign investment).
3. Some supplementary accounts (called annexes, supplementary/supplemental tables, satellite accounts, or thematic accounts) may show the relationship between financial stocks/flows and relevant social or physical quantities (such as demographic, geographic, environmental or employment variables). In this case, a sum of money is not related to another sum of money, but to a physical, environmental or social aggregate.

Part of the work involved in allocating observables to categories can be automated with the aid of computer programmes, but part of the work requires the human judgement of SNA statisticians. Some transactions are easily identifiable and countable, because they always occur in the same way, and for the same purpose. The way these transactions are recorded is plain, straightforward and uncontroversial. But there are other transactions which are much more complex and changeable — they may not be consistently recorded, and therefore they are more challenging to categorize and allocate correctly for accounting purposes. To understand some types of business and government processes requires a lot of knowledge. To understand the data aggregation methods also requires a lot of specialist knowledge.

To compile the whole inventory of SNA stock values and flow values, a complex grid of concepts, definitions and rules is applied. In this way, all the base data collected to build the accounts is ordered and structured. An annex document of the SNA 2008 manual provides an overview of the structure of SNA classifications, each of which has its own codes (SNA 2025 will introduce some revisions).

=== Institutional units ===
The logical starting point of the ordering task consists of grouping the types of registered/recorded "institutional units" of a country, guided by the Classification of Institutional Sectors. An institutional unit is a separate economic entity which can engage in production and/or trade with other entities in its own right, receive income, own assets and incur liabilities (debts or other obligations to pay). Normally an institutional unit maintains its own business accounts. Institutional units are usually legally defined organizations, social groups, or households consisting of one or more economically active persons. The main types of institutional units are:

1. Financial corporations.
2. Non-financial corporations.
3. Non-incorporated enterprises.
4. Government organizations.
5. Households.
6. Non-profit organizations.
7. Foreign institutional units

Institutional units can be grouped in sectors. Institutional sectors can be divided into sub-sectors, which identify and distinguish e.g. public and private, market and non-market enterprises, and domestically owned and foreign-owned enterprises, as well as different types of households. Usually the characteristics of all units are registered in large databases with metadata (including physical and postal addresses), and are continuously or regularly updated. These databases are the largest, most detailed collection of information about all the organizations active in the national economy.

Half a century ago, it was still quite common for companies and other institutional units to work with their own employees as one business unit from one location with one address, supplying one type of product or service. But in the digital era, many business and government units no longer operate this way. Instead, there are "networks" of organizations, "hubs", and "outsourced" services which perform tasks for multiple companies, subsidiaries and affiliates. The business operations no longer occur at just one site or address as one legal entity; employees work at multiple sites; and the locations used may shift more frequently. This makes the design of modern geostatistical registers of institutional units more complex than they were in the past. The registers have to be maintained and revised more frequently, and more research is required to be able to identify/categorize each separate organization correctly, for statistical purposes.

=== Industrial classification ===
All economic activities of institutional units in a country are identified and grouped with the aid of the 2023 International Standard Industrial Classification of All Economic Activities (ISIC version 5) or one of its predecessors. When all economic activities are registered in databases with metadata, according to their characteristics, it is possible to sort the data in a huge variety of different ways, at higher or lower levels of generality/specificity. This makes detailed and comprehensive comparisons possible for different economic activities, both within countries and between countries.

=== Other classifications ===
There are dozens of other classification systems which are applied to categorize stocks and flows in SNA accounts and their sub-accounts. Some classifications are universal, others are tailored to local conditions which could be relatively unique. At more detailed levels, the classification systems may be guided by existing SNA standards, but they may also be adapted to local circumstances or specific purposes (depending on the economic structures and processes involved). For example, the IMF Balance of Payments statistics modify and expand the SNA standards for external transactions with extra details.

The standard classification systems are designed to enable international comparisons. But they are also designed to provide data that give insight into local economic conditions. Statisticians normally try to design categories which combine standardization requirements plus technical essentials with the known needs of data users. If the data categories are not suited to the analyses that researchers want or need to do, or if they are not consistent with what the government requires, then the statistical information is not useful. So this matter has to be thought through carefully and comprehensively.

Categories and classifications in SNA are not so easily changed, because that can create new problems of statistical comparability, and because it can change the estimates of related statistical aggregates. Any classification change must be consistent with SNA concepts. Usually the majority of changes occur when a new SNA revision is released. Examples of some other global standard classifications that are, or will be applied in SNA are:

- OECD Benchmark Definition of Foreign Direct Investment 2025 (Fifth Edition) which sets the international standard for the compilation of FDI statistics, consistent with the Integrated Balance of Payments and International Investment Position Manual, Seventh Edition (BPM7) and SNA 2025.
- Harmonized Commodity Description and Coding System (HS, 2022). For classifying internationally traded goods in external trade statistics feeding into goods accounts.
- System of Environmental-Economic Accounting (SEEA-EA, 2021). For accounting for ecosystem services, environment conditions, and natural capital within the national accounts.
- Individual Consumption According to Purpose (COICOP, 2018). For household final consumption expenditure in national accounts, CPI compilation, and household budget surveys.
- Status in Employment (ICSE, 2018). For classifying jobs by employment relationship in labour force surveys, social statistics, and labour accounts.
- Classification of Financial Assets and Liabilities 2017 for the categorization of financial instruments (e.g., equity, debt securities, loans, currency and deposits, insurance and pension schemes, financial derivatives, other accounts receivable/payable).
- Activities for Time-Use Statistics (ICATUS, 2016). For classifying paid and unpaid work in time-use surveys and satellite household accounts.
- Classification by Broad Economic Categories (BEC, 2016). For converting trade data into end-use categories (capital goods, intermediate goods, consumption goods), integrating national accounts data and industrial statistics.
- Central Product Classification (CPC, 2015). For classifying products and services in supply and use tables, deflators, trade statistics, and price-volume measures in the SNA.
- Standard Classification of Education (ISCED, 2011).Data for the Sustainable Development Goals | Institute for Statistics (UIS) For classifying education levels in human capital accounts and public education expenditure.
- Extended Balance of Payments Services Classification 2010 (EBOPS, 2010) for standard breakdowns of the international trade in services (debit and credit) by types of services.
- Balance of Payments and International Investment Position Manual (BPM, 2009). For compiling external sector statistics including current, capital, and financial accounts (BPM7 is released in 2025 ).
- Standard Classification of Occupations (ISCO, 2008).International Standard Classification of Occupations (ISCO) For classifying occupations in labour statistics, productivity analysis, and workforce accounts.
- Standard International Trade Classification (SITC, 2006). For organizing international trade statistics in time series and analytical frameworks.
- Functions of Government (COFOG, 2000, next revision expected to be finalized in 2027). For classifying general government expenditure by function in public finance and fiscal analysis.
- Balance of Payments Codes for Standard Components and Additional Items 1999 (BOPCODE, 1999) which defines the standard components for balance of payments data and international investment position data.
- Purposes of Non-Profit Institutions Serving Households (COPNI, 1993). For classifying NPISH final consumption expenditure in the SNA institutional sector framework.
- Outlays of Producers by Purpose (COPP, 1993).UNSD — Classification Detail For classifying producer expenditures by function in satellite accounts such as R&D, health, or environment.

=== Ten core SNA accounts ===
Traditionally, the SNA framework provides a set of ten core accounts. The detailed design and terminology has changed somewhat through successive revisions, but conceptually the design remains more or less the same. The accounting principles for each of these core accounts are explained in the SNA manual. Broadly speaking, the ten traditional accounts deal with four main topics: (1) national income, expenditure & product, (2) national capital formation, saving and investment, (3) the national financial position, and (4) foreign transactions of the nation. All this provides economic insight into what is happening with production, the generation, distribution and use of income, and the accumulation of wealth of the nation. The ten core accounts can be described as follows:

1. The production account of economic activity which creates the gross output and gross value-added, generating national income.
2. The primary distribution of income account (the distribution of gross national income generated).
3. The redistribution of income account (including transfers and social spending by governments).
4. The use of income account (consumption expenditure and saving).
5. The capital account (investment, capital formation and accumulation).
6. The (domestic) financial transactions account ("flow of funds", borrowing/lending — tracking changes in financial assets/liabilities and debt financing).
7. The revaluation account (price changes in assets/liabilities of the nation, including capital gains and losses).
8. The other changes in assets account (changes in assets, liabilities and net worth which are not caused by transactions).
9. The balance sheet account of assets, liabilities and net worth.
10. The external transactions ("rest of the world") account (integration of current accounts, capital accounts and financial accounts).

The majority of member countries of the United Nations compile these ten "core" accounts. For each of these core accounts, more detailed breakdowns are possible in additional tables. However, NSO's usually do not publish a complete national set of all "possible" SNA accounts. They might not even supply a 100% complete set of national SNA data for the core accounts they do publish. The reasons could be (1) that some sorts of data are not applicable, (2) it is currently too difficult or costly to produce the data, (3) relevant data is not (yet) available, (4) the data is already published elsewhere, (5) there is some kind of official or legal restriction on data production. For example, if there is a lot of tourism in a country, a standard tourism account makes sense. But if there is very little tourism, then producing a standard tourism account may lack a good justification. NSO's may also produce and publish extra tables and accounts of their own, which are external to the SNA system and are an addition to required core accounts.

The SNA 2025 framework changes the formats of the core accounts to some extent. An important new step in SNA 2025 is the acceptance of more comprehensive household accounts, which according to many experts ought to be a standard feature of national accounts (household income, expenditure, assets, liabilities/debts and net wealth). The experience of the 2008 financial crisis revealed that changes in the financial position of households can have very large macroeconomic effects. Traditionally, statistics offices have collected data on household income and spending, but not for the whole financial position of households. An important reason could be that many respondents find the financial survey questions too intrusive, and do not want to cooperate (but respondents might also have difficulty to supply the information). However, in the digital era (and because of legal changes), people's attitudes have often changed, so that they are more willing to provide information (with proper data custody, and anonymized by the statisticians), because they recognize its national importance.

=== Satellite accounts and supplementary tables ===
Each of the SNA core accounts can be complemented with annexes providing extra details, sub-accounts with more detailed breakdowns of data, satellite accounts linked to the core accounts, and supplementary tables (or account variants) providing additional information. Some of these added accounts follow an existing SNA standard, but others could be mainly custom-designed by an NSO for its own (limited) uses in local conditions. Ideally all extra national accounts or tables produced by an NSO should be internationally comparable, but that may not always be the case. The non-core accounts are in principle always optional (there are some exceptions to this norm in the European Union). Whether extra accounts or extra tables are compiled and published by an NSO, depends mainly on their practical usefulness. NSO's produce them, if there is a need or demand for such accounts, and if there is a budget to produce the accounts. In some countries, it is not yet feasible to produce particular ancillary or satellite accounts, or it is too costly for the countries to do that.

Starting with the 1968 SNA revision, standards are provided for input-output tables (I/O tables) showing interactions between production sectors within the national economy (the enterprises of each sector make payments when they purchase inputs from other sectors, and receive revenue when they sell outputs to other sectors, so that the input and output values can be identified). The supply and use tables (SUT tables) are a further development of the input-output analysis for which standards were first created in SNA 1993. These SNA tables provide a detailed breakdown of the origin and use of goods and services in the national economy. They show in matrix format the supply of goods and services from production and imports, and their destined uses (intermediate and final consumption, capital formation and exports). In the European System of Accounts (ESA 2010), it is compulsory for EU member states to provide both SNA standard input-output tables and SNA standard supply & use tables to Eurostat, with a deadline of three years.

The term "satellite accounts" (comptes satellites) originated in France. French statisticians created the first official satellite accounts in the late 1960s, initially with experimental housing accounts in 1968. By the 1970s, they had developed systematic satellite accounts for health, education, research & development, social protection, and transportation. The goal was to provide detailed analyses of specific sectors to support government planning – maintaining consistency with the central national accounts framework, without altering it.

The U.S. Bureau of Economic Analysis (BEA) developed auxiliary accounts for its NIPA framework already in the 1950s, but they were not called "satellite" accounts. In the late 1980s, the demand for environmental accounts was met by the creation of satellite accounts. The US Bureau for Economic Analysis officially adopted a satellite account framework for research & development in 1994 and later for tourism and the space economy, referring to SNA guidelines.

Satellite accounts were officially recognized and defined for the first time in SNA 1993, and elaborated/expanded in SNA 2008 and SNA 2025. Several standards for satellite accounts are outlined in SNA 2008 and SNA 2025. Often more comprehensive explanations of standards and their application have been given in special handbooks, brochures or working papers. The OECD provides a guide to designing satellite accounts. In 2019, a review suggested that satellite accounts had been implemented for 21 different topics, with another 11 account topics being planned. Another source claimed that over 80 countries had implemented satellite accounts by 2019, with more than 20 different topics. A 2020 survey about the national use of SNA satellite accounts discovered that 241 satellite accounts had been created by 80 countries for 20 different account topics. The number of satellite accounts per country varied from 1 to 15 accounts, with a median number of 2 accounts, and an average of 4 accounts. The countries with the most satellite accounts were Canada (15), Portugal (13), Israel (9), Australia (8), Finland (8), Lithuania (8), China (7), and Mexico (7).

In SNA 2025, the term "satellite account" is formally abandoned in favour of the terms "thematic account" and "extended account". Thematic accounts disaggregate and rearrange already existing items in SNA core accounts, to make particular aspects of economic relations more visible and explicit. In other words, they provide extra details and breakdowns for the totals given in core accounts. Extended accounts go beyond the conceptual boundaries of the SNA integrated framework, often linking SNA accounting data to external data (for example, demographic data, geographic data, employment data, population data, data on natural resources), with the aim of enabling more comprehensive insight about a topic of interest. In such cases, SNA data is linked to non-SNA variables, following standard conventions to assist comparability. The SNA 2025 Manual enlarges the scope of macroeconomic accounting, and defines how SNA standards can be linked to non-SNA standards. For example, SNA 2025 recognizes four kinds of capital: economic capital, human capital, natural capital and social capital.

=== Quarterly SNA accounts ===
Uniquely, the US standard National Income and Product Accounts have from 1947 onward always included quarterly estimates of GNP (GDP since 1991). This mirrored the widespread use of quarterly earnings reports by (publicly listed) US corporations.

The standard SNA accounts of the UN were originally assumed to be annual accounts (with quarterly data as an optional supplement, at the discretion of NSO’s). The UN accounts were not designed or envisaged to provide "up-to-the-minute" indicators on economic activity. It took a lot of time to collect, collate and calculate all the necessary information. The production of quarterly data was beyond the capacity of many countries. The annual estimates were often revised at a later stage.

In the 1940s and 1950s, a few European countries such as West Germany, Norway and Britain already experimented with quarterly accounts for specific sectors and for gross product estimates. This data was used primarily for business cycle analysis and forecasting. In the 1960s, more countries began to publish quarterly GNP/GDP estimates. Quarterly national accounts were formally introduced in the 1995 European System of Accounts (ESA 95). An ESA Handbook on quarterly accounts was published in 1999. The IMF began to publish and update a Quarterly National Accounts Manual from 2001 onward. The SNA 2008 manual states general concepts, definitions and classifications that quarterly SNA accounts should follow. The Eurostat ESA 2010 manual includes a chapter on compiling quarterly national accounts. SNA 2025 provides a more detailed and structured treatment of temporal disaggregation issues involved in compiling quarterly accounts.

=== Technical documentation ===
There are five main types of technical documentation about SNA:

1. Official SNA manuals
2. Official SNA handbooks on specific topics
3. Official SNA papers and reports on specific topics
4. Information literature about SNA
5. Academic studies of SNA topics and issues

Series of technical papers, reports and other documentation covering national accounts topics include the United Nations Statistics Division publications, the OECD Working Papers, OECD Reports and research papers, IMF Staff Papers, IMF Working Papers, World Bank documents and reports and Eurostat statistical working papers. Each of these organizations has its own library or publications portal, which can be accessed online. Often NSO's publish their own methodology papers, and may send a copy to UNSD, which archives it in databases linked to UNdata.

== The world's largest national accounts ==
How the "largest national accounts" should be defined is debatable. The criterion used here is population size, because as a general rule the larger the population is, the larger will be the volume and complexity of transactions and transfers that have to be accounted for. In 2025, the world's eight largest countries by population together had about 4.67 billion residents, which is equal to about 56.7% of the total world population. The United States and the European Union are included among the "largest accounts", because they produce integrated national accounts based on data from their member states.

=== Republic of India ===
India first introduced national income estimates in 1952, and has progressively integrated SNA updates in its National Accounting System (NAS), including the 1968, 1993, and 2008 revisions. NAS adheres broadly to SNA concepts (such as GDP, Gross Value Added, and sectoral accounts), but also uses country-specific methods to deal with data limitations, a large informal sector, and local administrative practices. India's Central Statistics Office (under the Ministry of Statistics and Programme Implementation) continues to revise the NAS to improve harmonization with SNA standards, but retains methods specially designed for Indian economic conditions.

=== People's Republic of China ===
Annual SNA-based estimates for the People's Republic of China (excluding Hong Kong, Macao and Taiwan) were first produced for 1985. For 1985–1992, separate national accounts were compiled according to the Material Product System (MPS) and SNA 1993, although at that time the SNA data were mainly derived from MPS accounts (using a conversion method created by the United Nations Statistics Division). In 1992, SNA was adopted by the National Bureau of Statistics of China as the official accounting system. From that time, the MPS system was abandoned, and Chinese national accounts were directly compiled in accordance with SNA principles.

=== European Union ===
Eurostat uses a version of the SNA for the European Union, called the European System of Accounts (ESA). Participation in the ESA system is mandatory for European Union member states. All EU Member States are legally obliged to use ESA 2010 for their national and regional accounts. This includes providing standardized macroeconomic data to Eurostat, consistent with the ESA framework. The ESA concepts are uniformly applied in budget reports by EU member governments and in their official financial statistics, as well as in EU financial surveillance systems for member governments. For example, according to the EU Stability and Growth Pact (SGP), EU government budget deficits must ordinarily not exceed 3% of GDP, and the norm for EU government debts (the public debt) is that they must not exceed 60% of GDP.

=== United States of America ===
The American-designed National Income and Product Accounts (NIPA), used uniquely in the United States, feature broadly the same concepts as SNA, but they differ from the SNA in details of methodology, classifications and presentation. The traditional similarity between the SNA and the NIPA exists, because the original design of the SNA in 1953 was to a certain extent modeled on the NIPA accounting system already adopted by the US federal government in 1947. The subsequent SNA revisions were also informed or influenced by developments in the NIPA accounts. Since 1993, the American Bureau of Economic Analysis has made an effort to achieve greater conceptual consistency with SNA standards. The differences in data and presentation between the two systems are not an insurmountable problem, because the NIPA and the SNA both provide sufficient information to rework statistics to match each other's concepts, categories and classifications. Each year, the Bureau of Economic Analysis prepares NIPA estimates on an SNA basis for an OECD questionnaire survey. These estimates are used to produce modified US national accounts statistics that are comparable with other countries, and which are published by international organizations such as the OECD, IMF and the World Bank.

=== Brazil, Indonesia, Pakistan, and Nigeria ===
The national accounts of Brazil, Indonesia, Pakistan and Nigeria (altogether home to about 988 million people in 2025, i.e. almost one billion) are all based on SNA concepts and methods, but with differences in the SNA versions used, implementation quality, and institutional capacity. The Brazilian Institute of Geography and Statistics (IBGE) uses SNA 2008, and is highly advanced in social accounting, with full implementation of institutional sector accounts, supply and use tables, quarterly national accounts and integration of satellite accounts (e.g., environmental accounts, health, and education). Statistics Indonesia uses SNA 2008, and its accounts are quite comprehensive. The Pakistan Bureau of Statistics uses SNA 1993 and SNA 2008, but complete data is not yet available for all standard SNA accounts. The National Bureau of Statistics, Nigeria (NBS Nigeria) uses SNA 2008, aiming to rebase the data sets to 2019.

== Regional organizations assisting SNA development ==
There exist numerous regional organizations which assist countries at different stages of statistical development to implement SNA accounting techniques. The World Bank tracks the level of statistical capacity for all countries of the world, and provides an overview. This statistical capacity is critical for the production of good national accounts. To estimate SNA stocks and flows, a lot of national data have to be available (from censuses, surveys, administrative records etc.).

=== Africa ===
In West Africa and Central Africa, there is the Economic and Statistical Observatory of Sub-Saharan Africa (AFRISTAT) created in 1993 by WAEMU countries and other associated countries. The organization promotes harmonized national accounts, following SNA 1993 and moving to SNA 2008 and SNA 2025. In East Africa and Southern Africa, there are regional organizations like Common Market for Eastern and Southern Africa (COMESA), Southern African Development Community (SADC), and East African Community (EAC) which have statistical committees supporting SNA implementation. These are backed by AfDB, the IMF's AFRITAC organizations, and the African Centre for Statistics in UNECA.

=== Asia ===
The ASEAN Guidelines on National Accounts aim to improve SNA 2008 alignment, harmonize national accounts, strengthen capacity, and improve data quality and dissemination in the ASEAN region. The program involves 10 countries and is sponsored by ASEANstats, IMF, UN ESCAP, and Asian Development Bank (ADB). The Statistical Institute for Asia and the Pacific (SIAP) of the United Nations Economic and Social Commission for Asia and the Pacific (ESCAP) as well as the United Nations Economic and Social Commission for Western Asia (ESCWA) provide trainings in SNA knowledge, and technical support for SNA implementation.

=== Europe ===
The United Nations Economic Commission for Europe (UNECE) set up in 1947 by the UN Economic and Social Council (ECOSOC) promotes the implementation of SNA in UNECE countries, especially in South-East European (SEE) countries and East European, Caucasus and Central-Asian (EECCA) countries. UNECE maintains its own statistical database.

=== Latin America and Caribbean ===
In Latin America and the Caribbean, there is the regional program Sistema de Cuentas Nacionales (SCN), coordinated by the Economic Commission for Latin America and the Caribbean (ECLAC) together with the UNSD, IMF, and World Bank. Its aim is to organize, standardize and harmonize the implementation of SNA 2008 across the region. There are 33 participating countries. The Caribbean Community framework (CARICOM) provides SNA technical cooperation for Antigua and Barbuda, Bahamas, Barbados, Belize, Dominica, Grenada, Guyana, Jamaica, Haiti, Montserrat, St. Kitts and Nevis, St. Lucia, St. Vincent and the Grenadines, Suriname, Trinidad and Tobago. It coordinates with UNSD and ECLAC on SNA 2008 implementation, with a special focus on tourism satellite accounts (TSA) and remittances.

=== Middle East ===
The GCC Statistical Center (GCCStat, Gulf Cooperation Council) coordinates statistical work, including national accounts, for Saudi Arabia, UAE, Qatar, Kuwait, Bahrain, and Oman. It is moving toward SNA 2008-compliant national accounts. The focus is now on non-oil sectors, satellite accounts, and price indices. Although it is not a UN organization, the Statistical, Economic and Social Research and Training Centre for Islamic Countries (SESRIC) works with the UN to support statistical capacity and socio-economic research in Islamic countries.

=== Pacific ===
To support and harmonize the implementation of SNA across the Pacific region, several organizations provide technical assistance and capacity-building initiatives. Pacific Community's Statistics for Development Division offers guidance and training to enhance statistical systems. The Pacific Financial Technical Assistance Centre (PFTAC) aims to strengthen institutional capacities in macroeconomic and financial management, including national accounts statistics. The United Nations Economic and Social Commission for Asia and the Pacific (UNESCAP) conducts regional programs to improve economic statistics in Asia and the Pacific. In addition, the National Transfer Accounts (NTA) network is also active in the region.

=== OECD role ===
Although the OECD does play an important role in shaping the global statistical system, and has observer status in the United Nations, it is not counted here as a "regional organization". The reason is that geographically the OECD member states are not in "one region", but are spread across the whole world, from Chile to South Korea, from New Zealand to France and from the United States to Poland. So there is no exclusively "regional" mandate. Originally, the OECD really was a regional organization. It was called the Organisation for European Economic Co-operation (OEEC). That institution was founded in 1948 to administer American and Canadian aid under the Marshall Plan (for the reconstruction of Europe after World War II). However, there are now many member countries of the OECD outside Europe, and the international role of the OECD has changed and expanded greatly. Nowadays the OECD takes a global approach, working with more than a hundred countries to improve and advise on government policies, economic and business development, statistical analysis, social and environmental issues etc. Compiling comparative SNA data sets, providing macro-economic country analyses and advising on SNA methodology are only a part of a multitude of tasks that the OECD performs today, to help countries to advance.

== Publication of SNA data ==
No single agency has a monopoly on publishing SNA statistics. SNA statistical data as such is usually considered to be a public good, and its producers typically do not "own" the data they make publicly available (in the sense of copyright or patent rights). However, they do own intellectual property and access rights for the processes, methodologies, documents, databases and software used to compile, store, distribute and manage the statistical data (see e.g. Data Act (European Union) and EU Data Act, September 2025).

=== Designs ===
There are few universal design standards for how exactly SNA data are published, in print copy or digitally. There is no universal SNA logo, trademark, barcode or QR-code. NSO's and intergovernmental bodies typically publish SNA-type national data series using their own formats and styles. International organizations like the IMF, OECD, the World Bank and Eurostat often adjust national SNA data according to their own methodologies. International agencies will often include adjusted United States data sets in their comparative SNA statistics, even though the US has its own NIPA accounting system. Sometimes estimates for core variables are included for countries/areas which are at present still outside the SNA aegis.

=== Access ===
Published SNA statistics can be freely used and cited by the public, provided that the source is acknowledged correctly by the user. More detailed accounts data at a lower level of aggregation is often available on request. Statistics offices typically provide a lot of information free of charge (as a government-funded public service). However, usually they do charge fees for (1) many of their printed and copyrighted publications, (2) the supply of specialized data sets, and (3) specialized data services. How exactly the boundary between paywall data and free data is drawn, and what the costs are, can vary from country to country. It may depend on who the data users are, what sort of data they want, how the data is used, and what the local laws and policies permit.

=== Publishers ===
For particular sorts of SNA data sets, one national or international agency is usually the "primary" publisher. For example, international agencies are more likely to publish comprehensive international comparisons of SNA data on a regular basis (for example, UNSD, OECD, IMF, World Bank and Eurostat). Detailed national SNA statistics are usually available from national statistics offices (NSO's) or national governments. Data users have the option of getting their national data sets either from NSO's or from intergovernmental organizations, or from some third-party source (such as central banks, economic research institutes or academic collections). The NSO's across the world have to publish annual and quarterly SNA statistics according to deadlines. Intergovernmental and international agencies cannot publish their internationally comparative data, if data from some countries is missing.

=== UN Yearbooks ===
Economic and financial data produced by UN member countries are used to compile comparable annual (and sometimes quarterly) data on the gross product, national income, investment, capital transactions, government expenditure, and foreign trade. The results are published by NSO's, but also in two UN Yearbooks: (1) National Accounts Statistics: Main Aggregates and Detailed Tables and (2) National Accounts Statistics: Analysis of Main Aggregates. From 2025 onward, the yearbooks are published in line with the SNA 2025 standards. The values provided for the accounts of individual countries in the UN yearbooks are cited in the national currency.

=== Constant dollar data series ===
Current and constant US dollar equivalents can be found in the online UN National Accounts Main Aggregates Database. Additional variables can be accessed online in the UNdata Portal. Alternative sources of GDP and its components in US dollars at current and constant prices are the World Development Indicators (WDI) of the World Bank, and the World Economic Outlook Database of the IMF. Both the World Bank and the IMF use exchange-rate converted GDP estimates and PPP-adjusted measures. The IMF publishes comprehensive SNA-based Balance of Payments statistics for the world's countries, as well as comparative statistics on government finance. The OECD and the World Bank publish a lot of SNA-based comparative economic statistics, country reports and regional reports. To make the comparisons, the data series often have to be converted to a common currency (usually US dollars).

=== Data revisions ===
National accounts data is susceptible to revision. A very large number of different data sources, entries and estimation procedures are involved that can have impact on the totals. Discrepancies can occur between the totals cited for the same accounting period in different publications issued in different years. The "first final figures" may later be revised, sometimes several times. The revisions may be quantitatively slight, but cumulatively (across e.g. ten years) they can sometimes alter a trend significantly. The researcher has to bear all this in mind when seeking to obtain consistent and up-to-date data series. Often it is possible to link old and new data series using some suitable chaining method. The possibility of data revisions are a good reason for correctly citing the source of the data.

== SNA data quality and coverage ==
SNA data quality is relatively good, because there are data standards, and because the data are regularly checked and monitored by several agencies, not just by the data producers. Nevertheless, the data sets of some countries are much more complete than others. Both the quality and the comprehensiveness of national accounts data can differ between countries. There are six main reasons:

- Available resources: some governments (such as in OECD countries and countries with large populations) invest far more money and employees in statistical research than other governments. What matters in this sense is, above all, whether a society sees the value of statistics, makes extensive use of statistical expertise for analytical and policymaking purposes, and therefore is sympathetic to investing in the statistical enterprise.
- Local conditions: economic activity in some countries is much more difficult to measure accurately than in others — for example, there may exist a large grey or informal economy; pervasive illiteracy; the absence of a cash economy; survey access difficulties because of geographic factors; socio-political instability; pervasive corruption; disasters; pandemics; public hostility to statistical surveys; lack of accurate population and address registers; armed conflict and large-scale wars; or large-scale mobility/migration of people and assets.
- Degree of autonomy: some NSO's have more scientific autonomy, mandates and budgetary discretion than others, allowing them to do surveys or create statistical reports which other statistical agencies are prevented from doing, for legal, financial or political reasons.
- Expertise: some countries (for example, Australia, Brazil, Britain, Canada, China, France, Germany, Hungary, The Netherlands, Poland, Russia and the United States) have a strong intellectual (scholarly, professional or cultural) tradition in the area of national accounts and social statistics, sometimes going back a hundred years or more. Other countries (such as many African countries), where a population census began to be organized by the government much later, and where most universities started later, do not have such lengthy research traditions. However, developing countries have the advantage, that in creating their statistics production systems, they can often adopt straightaway the very latest and most advanced methods and technologies in the world, without having to go through endless revisions and changes from old methods to new methods.
- Legal frameworks: there can be specific legal rules which influence the quality and coverage of national accounts, because they can facilitate, or restrict, or block statistical research in specific areas.
- Ability to adapt: the statistical enterprise is in some respects intrinsically conservative, because it adheres to a legal framework, and must safeguard the continuity of comparable statistics, not just in the present, but also for future generations. Yet the real world also changes, and the statistical enterprise must change with it. What makes a big difference, is the ability to adapt to new circumstances, guided by wise management and competent advisors. In some countries, there exists a better ability to adapt than in other countries (but there may be no simple explanation for why this is so, it could be a combination of circumstances).

The United Nations and its partners have rather little power to enforce the actual production of statistics to a given standard, even if international agreements are signed by member states. But they can help with technical advice, training and capacity building. The UNSD collects and archives national accounts statistics from most of the world's countries and territories. Some of the world's states are part of other international/interstate unions (for example the European Union, the OECD, or the United States), which oblige member states to supply standardized data sets, for the purpose of interstate or international comparisons and coordination. In exchange for supplying data, countries can also receive foreign data and expert scientific advice. So there are incentives and benefits for countries to cooperate, for the sake of obtaining more useful, comprehensive, and internationally comparable statistical information. If they cooperate, countries can obtain vastly more foreign statistical information and expertise at a lower cost, which matters if the information is essential to have for local, national and international decision making. The bottom line for the quality of official national accounts data is adequate funding and staffing, cooperation and trust.).

== SNA Developments ==
SNA continues to be developed further. International conferences are regularly held to discuss various conceptual and measurement issues, and proposed revisions. This is necessary, because the world changes, new data needs emerge, new coordination/integration challenges arise, and new production techniques become available. The proposed SNA 2025 provides for many new standards and supplementary SNA tables on different topics. Many of the new supplementary tables aim to link SNA financial data with social or physical statistics from other international or national agencies, with the aim of providing standardized, comparable national data sets on specific topics (such as labor use, natural resources, productivity, health etc.).

There are many ongoing projects, such as developing standard accounts for environmental resources, the measurement of the trade in various services and of productivity, the treatment of insurance payments, the grey economy and informal economy, employee compensation in the form of non-wage income, intangible capital, cryptocurrencies, labor economics etc. Projects related to the SNA 2025 revision are mentioned on the UNSD webpage.

Discussions and updates are reported in the news bulletin SNA News and Notes. Official SNA revisions are always documented at the UN Statistics Division site. For the 2008 SNA revision, the full final text is available online. For the 2025 Revision, only the pre-edit document is available so far; the final official text still has to be approved and published. The pre-edit version of SNA 2025 shows which text from SNA 2008 is revised, and which text is a new addition to SNA guidelines.

== Achievements of SNA ==
The achievements of SNA, and why they matter, can be summarized as follows:

1. After more than 70 years of development across the world, the System of National Accounts is the only comprehensive, internationally agreed standard for national accounting practice. It is now used by almost all governments, universities, and international financial institutions, as well as by enterprises, economic research institutes, thinktanks, NGO's, interest groups, media and private researchers. It provides detailed guidance to statistical offices in more than 200 countries, territories and areas. Its globally standardized approach ensures that economic activity is measured on a conceptually consistent and quantitatively comparable basis across the whole world.
2. The SNA framework offers a coherent, integrated set of macroeconomic accounts built on shared concepts, definitions, classifications, and accounting rules. It provides a comprehensive framework for recording most of the important stocks and flows in the economy of every nation, including production, income, saving, investment, and both financial and nonfinancial wealth. It also encompasses input-output tables, supply and use tables, financial accounts, balance sheets, and international transactions. The SNA framework supports the development of satellite accounts — modular extensions allowing for specialized analysis (in areas such as environmental accounting, the economic contributions of tourism and cultural industries, health expenditures and financing, expenditures and investments in education etc.) — while maintaining consistency/compatibility with the core accounts. All these accounts are an indispensable source for a wide range of macroeconomic statistics used by policymakers, researchers, investors, entrepreneurs and institutions in all countries.
3. For the first time in history, the SNA framework has made it possible for almost all countries and territories to produce internationally comparable economic indicators on a regular basis. It offers empirical insight into the size, structure, and evolution of economies, and facilitates the quantitative analysis of national and global economic trends, problems, and developments. It plays a central role in the growth of knowledge and international understanding of economic life in all countries. SNA data sets enable opinions and hypotheses about the economy to be tested in a comprehensive way, and can contribute to greater objectivity about economic affairs. The quality of the data is checked regularly by different agencies, at the national and international level. While SNA accounts are not designed to provide all the data relevant to solving all of society's problems, they can complement other information sources to improve understanding, reasoning and effective action.
4. The SNA architecture is one of the biggest collaborative achievements in the emerging global statistical system. Its maintenance and development depend on broad national and international cooperation by national statistical offices, individual experts and related agencies, coordinated through intergovernmental organizations (the United Nations, IMF, World Bank, OECD, and Eurostat). This cooperation is mostly based on voluntary agreements and mutual understanding among countries. It enables the use of shared methodologies, terminology, a common language and classifications, and supports the dissemination of economic information worldwide through many different channels. The system also contributes to capacity building on the ground, providing technical assistance and staff training to NSO's, especially in emerging, transitional, and developing countries.
5. Designed for universal use, the SNA framework accommodates the needs of countries at all levels of economic development, and in all national contexts. It facilitates integration with other statistical systems, and promotes coherence across different domains of economic and social statistics. Ongoing research and discussion ensure that the SNA can meet new challenges, such as measuring the digital economy, accounting for cryptocurrencies, and incorporating environmental sustainability measures. The SNA approach has changed across the years and adapted to new circumstances, but it has proved resilient and durable. It has not fallen apart and has survived in member states despite wars, disasters, crises and calamities. With its continual efforts for improvement, updates and refinement, SNA remains an indispensable tool for achieving consistency, comparability, and clarity in the statistical representation of national economies and the world economy.

== Debates about SNA ==
SNA data is used every day by millions of public servants, private sector data professionals, businesspeople, media and academics worldwide. Without SNA data (whether published by the United Nations and its partners, or published by other agencies), they would not have the internationally comparable economic data they require. So the data users appreciate that the information is available. However, SNA has also been criticized for its shortcomings. That is to be expected — with so many users of SNA data worldwide, and given the limits of what the SNA accounts can provide for different countries, it is simply impossible to satisfy everybody's economic data needs all of the time. For example, it has been argued that SNA should include measures of happiness, but this idea has never been implemented (although SNA 2025 adopts the category of "wellbeing"). There do already exist international happiness measures, such as the World Happiness Report, which can be compared with SNA economic variables. The United Nations introduced the Human Development Index in 1990 specifically because it was felt that economic indicators alone are insufficient to assess human development; economic indicators do not necessarily express the average quality of life of a country's residents.

=== Representation issues ===
The criticism most often made of SNA is that its design, concepts and classifications do not adequately reflect the interactions, relationships, and activities of the real world. The effect of that is (allegedly) a distorted picture of the world. For example, there are the following sorts of criticisms:

1. The SNA system allegedly does not provide explicit detail for particular economic phenomena, suggesting thereby that they do not really exist or are of no significance (for example, Islamic banking, large multinational corporations and small business, the value of natural resources, the value of housework). The largest global capital asset is residential housing (and more generally, real estate), but there are few internationally comparable economic statistics for it. In many countries, the NSO does already survey and provide household financial statistics, but the statistics are not (or not fully) standardized, often incomplete and therefore not internationally comparable (or difficult to compare).
2. There is allegedly something wrong with the valuation scheme that is being assumed (for example, the productive contribution of capital assets, the imputed income of banks and other financial institutions, the imputed rental services of owner-occupied housing, the imputed value of electricity generated by household solar panels, the estimated value of natural capital).
3. In the valiant attempt to include transactions of all "micro" business activities under general "macro" headings, the true situation is allegedly misrepresented because a large portion of micro-transactions does not easily fit under the general conceptual headings (for example, the informal economy).
4. It is claimed that the traditional structure of SNA, based on the concepts of value-added and capital formation, plus a particular view of assets and liabilities, is in reality no longer adequate to describe the modern economy. This is (allegedly) caused by (1) successive piecemeal or "patchwork" revisions, which aim to preserve continuity and comparability, but which are now out of step with economic science and economic reality, (2) the increase of non-traditional transactions and economic activities as well as totally new financial phenomena, and (3) changes in the weighting and composition of many different kinds of economic activities which are not adequately reflected in SNA categorization and classification systems — within countries, between countries and between regions.
5. National accounts data on their own are, it is claimed, not useful to solve many of society's problems, because those problems really require quite different kinds of data to solve them (for example, population data, behavioral data, attitudinal data, legal data, or physical data). So, SNA data really need to be integrated with other data in a standard way, to provide useful international comparisons.
6. National accounts data are often revised to some extent after the first release. The effect can be, that financial markets overreact in the wrong way, when the first estimates are published. Sometimes politicians try to interfere with or downplay the figures that are released, to calm the markets (normally this is rare, because the risk is that people will no longer trust the figures, which increases business, political and consumer uncertainty).
7. The international streams of past and present publications about SNA and SNA data can appear to data users as a complex "jungle", which lacks oversight, transparency, coherence and consistency. It may take a lot of time and effort to track down the comparative statistics that researchers want to use. Cognitively helpful information design, clear fonts and layouts, and comprehensible language are allegedly often lacking in official publications. Online databases may not be user-friendly. Little comparative research of good quality is done about SNA data users — what data users are looking for, how they use the data, what problems they encounter, what improvements could be made etc. There is no standard SNA user survey with good questions that provides essential and useful information about data users (both organizations and individuals), so that communicating about data can be improved on the basis of reliable evidence.

SNA authorities have responded to such criticisms in many different ways, large and small.

In the last decades, there are constantly many efforts across the world to standardize statistical data to make them internationally comparable, with equal or similar data quality. SNA was created specifically as a tool for measuring changes in economic activity, national income and economic growth in a standard way, which enables international comparisons. SNA was not designed to include "everything we need to know about a country or about the world", and it is impossible for SNA to do that. SNA design is a compromise involving many different concerns and interests, but it aims to be the best possible compromise that is currently feasible. There are many data topics which, although they are not included in the SNA framework, are already covered elsewhere by other United Nations agencies or by its partner organizations.

As regards current topics of interest, the United Nations is often already developing concepts & methods for statistical information (e.g. Islamic banking), or there is already an UN agency which supplies data (e.g. UNCTAD provides data on multinational/transnational corporations). Furthermore, a lot of SNA data that seems to be "not available" can be obtained simply by digging deeper into the detailed breakdowns of the SNA tables. Quite often, there exists much more SNA statistical information than most data users actually use.

Many concerns about unmet data needs are being addressed via the design of supplementary SNA standard tables or SNA satellite accounts (thematic and extension accounts), which provide modified SNA aggregates for special uses, or which integrate SNA accounts data with social, demographic, financial or environmental data from other sources. The advantage of this approach is that the comparability with traditional SNA accounts and previous SNA data is not jeopardized by constant revisions to accommodate new data demands.

SNA requires standard, comparable accounting formats, and its design has a specific, limited statistical purpose. Some types of data production simply do not fit with that structure and purpose (but SNA data could be combined with data from other sources). The SNA 2025 manual provides standard conceptual frameworks to address the majority of the contemporary concerns and data needs, clearly distinguishing between what SNA can contribute and the integration or matching of the SNA framework with non-SNA standards. It is primarily the responsibility of the NSO's to take the initiative to produce new and additional data that is consistent with the new SNA 2025 frameworks for various new topics, if they consider it important to create that data, in the present or in the future.

Particularly in OECD countries, a great effort has been made by NSO's to supply timely SNA data which is accurate and complete, and which does not have to be revised very much afterwards. Modern technology increasingly makes possible much faster data collection, processing and publication, because it can be done with digital and online questionnaires (sometimes using mobile phones); digital coding; data warehouses; automated searching, editing, error-tracking and dataset construction; automating procedures with artificial intelligence, etc. Aided by modern computers, data production can often be realized faster, more efficiently, with fewer errors and better quality. This is especially important in countries with very large survey populations (for example, Brazil, China, Germany, India, Indonesia, Japan, Nigeria, Pakistan, Russia, and the United States).

Statisticians safeguard the autonomy, objectivity, quality and integrity of data production and data releases, with specific professional protocols and the provision of explanations to the public about significant statistical trends. Attention is being given to information design to make data understandable. Often vastly more data is available than is actually used for empirical investigation by researchers.

=== Criticism of GDP ===
The most popular criticism of national accounts concerns the concept of gross domestic product (GDP). GDP has been criticized from all sides for what it does not measure, or because it allegedly mismeasures the national economy. Economists like Joseph Stiglitz argued that a measure of "well-being" was needed to balance a measure of output growth. Such measures were designed, but so far they have not been used much in national SNA accounts. SNA 2025 does broaden the national accounts framework, to account better for elements affecting wellbeing and sustainability, and to inform various policy goals of governments and international organizations. According to Stiglitz, one of the paradoxes of GDP measurement is that:

“…while GDP is supposed to measure the value of output of goods and services, in one key sector — government — we typically have no way of doing it, so we often measure the output simply by the inputs. If government spends more — even if inefficiently — output goes up.”

In part, the criticism of GDP is misplaced, because the fault is not so much with the concept itself. It is useful to have measures of the value of a country's total net output and measures of national income, showing their changes over time – that's better than having no measures at all. The fault is more with the actual use that is made of the concept by governments, intellectuals, the media and businessmen in public discourse.

GDP measures are frequently misused by writers who do not understand what the measures mean, how the measures were produced, or what the measures can be validly used for. Many of the critics of SNA have no real knowledge about the main purpose of SNA, never mind understanding the possibilities and limits of the accounting design. GDP is used for an enormous diversity of comparisons, but many of those comparisons may conceptually lack validity, or are simply not appropriate.

- In the US, for example, it is very common for politicians and the media to equate GDP with "the economy", but this is plainly false — GDP does not measure all economic activity, it is only a measure of the new gross value added generated by production of goods and services during an interval of time (the net value of a country's output) which, in the SNA accounts, equates to certain measures of national income/expenditure. All economic activities, transactions and incomes which are outside the SNA production boundary (for example, asset trades, receipts of property income, transfers and capital gains) are not included in Gross Output and GDP. In the UK, the BBC nevertheless claims wrongly that GDP is "a measure of all the economic activity of companies, governments, and people in a country".
- For another example, a popular statistic is "public debt as a percentage of GDP". This debt/GDP ratio could be understood (wrongly) to mean that the public debt, or its annual repayment, is a component of expenditure on GDP, or that it represents the size of national income currently required to pay off the national debt. What this debt/GDP ratio ignores, is that the coverage of the public debt variable and the coverage of the GDP variable are quite different. GDP includes only flows of incomes/expenditures and taxes considered to be inside the production boundary, i.e. flows directly generated by production. GDP does not include all the revenues and expenditures of the government, it does not include all the revenues and expenditures in the economy, and it is not a measure of assets or liabilities. The debt/GDP ratio says nothing about the amount of principal and interest that must repaid per year or per quarter. To assess a financial position, debt liabilities incurred must in principle always be related to the total assets held and the total revenues from which the debt can be repaid. It must be made clear how much must be paid each year or quarter to repay the debt (which is usually not the whole sum). If (say) a couple applies for a home mortgage loan from a bank, the bank usually wants to know much more financial information than just their annual net salary from work. To assess the total "mortgage" of the whole national economy, both public debt and private debt have to be considered — quite often, and particularly in developed countries, private debt (of enterprises and households) exceeds public debt, by a large margin.

The main response by statistical authorities to the criticism and misuse of GDP data has not been to abandon or abolish the GDP measure. Instead, statisticians have provided additional, complementary data sets about phenomena which GDP does not measure, and cannot measure. With this approach, most data users can get the data that they want, most of the time, without denying the data needs of other users. There are official limits to the varieties of data that can be made available, but with the aid of modern technology, a vastly greater variety of data can be made accessible to the public, at the touch of a button.

=== Feminist concerns ===
SNA has been criticized as biased by feminist economists such as Marilyn Waring, Maria Mies, Lourdes Benería, and Nancy Folbre, because no imputation for the monetary value of unpaid housework or for unpaid voluntary labor (mainly done by women) is made in the accounts, even although GDP does include things like the "imputed rental value of owner-occupied dwellings" and an imputation for "financial intermediation services indirectly measured" (FISIM). This SNA omission of unpaid housework (because it falls outside the SNA "production boundary") is said to obscure the reality that market production depends to a large extent on non-market labor being performed. In turn, that lacuna in the data allegedly promotes a distorted picture of economic life (which in reality includes both paid and unpaid work).

However, such criticism does raise technical issues for the statisticians who would have to produce the standard data, such as:

- Whether an international standard method of comparing the value of household services is technically feasible, given e.g. that the precise financial arrangements between household members are difficult to verify and measure, and that the conditions under which the market equivalents for unpaid household services are supplied vary greatly between countries.
- Whether making imputations for the value of women's voluntary work would result in truly meaningful and uniformly valued measures.
- Whether attaching an annual official price to voluntary labor, done primarily by women, itself actually performs an emancipatory or morally propitious function, or has a general useful purpose beyond academia.

The intention of those who would like to produce standard data for the imputed market value or imputed cost of women's voluntary labor can be perfectly honorable. Many scientific studies already exist on the subject. However, the production and cost of creating this data every year, as a standard procedure, has to be justifiable in terms of scientific feasibility and practical utility. It could be argued that attaching an imputed price to housework as a standard international procedure, might not be the best data to have about housework. It míght not make people who do housework more valued in the eyes of others, and it might not result in a general improvement of social attitudes and behaviour. There is certainly a permanent need for data on housework and voluntary work, because (as surveys prove) so many people are involved in it. But SNA might perhaps not be the best place to supply that data. There have nevertheless been quite a few proposals for a standard SNA satellite account for household labour).

The (pre-edit) SNA 2025 manual provides a definitive official solution: it revises and refines the concepts for the analysis of the household economy; it encourages countries to develop extended accounts for unpaid household service work (in chapter 1 §64); recognizes the importance of the household economy for wellbeing (in chapter 2 §56–61); fully integrates voluntary and unpaid labour into labour accounting (in chapter 16); and specifies the standard conceptual structure and formats of accounts for "unpaid household service work" in chapter 34 §83–103. So this is a win for the feminist movement. However, the creation of such satellite accounts by NSO's remains optional and voluntary, not compulsory or obligatory. It does not necessarily mean that all countries will now regularly produce such accounts, using exactly the same measurement techniques.

In most OECD countries so far, statisticians have usually estimated the value of housework using data from time use surveys. The valuation principle applied is usually that of how much a service would cost on average, if it was purchased at market rates, instead of being voluntarily supplied. Sometimes an "opportunity cost" method is also used: in this case, statisticians estimate how much women could earn in a paid job, if they were not doing unpaid housework. Robert Eisner estimated that the market value of unpaid housework in money terms was equivalent to about 33% of the value of US GDP in 1981. Nancy Folbre provides more recent comparative data.

When she was the head of the International Monetary Fund, Christine Lagarde reportedly claimed at an IMF/World Bank annual meeting in Tokyo (October 2012) that women could rescue Japan's stagnating economy, if more of them took paid jobs instead of doing unpaid care work. A 2010 Goldman Sachs report had calculated that Japan's GDP would rise by 15 percent, if the participation of Japanese women in the paid labor force was increased from 60 percent to 80 percent, matching that of men.

However, domestic and care work would still need to be done by someone, meaning that either women and men would need to share household responsibilities more equally, or that parents would have to rely on childcare and eldercare supplied by paid caregivers from the public sector, or from the private sector (nursemaids, au pairs, nannies, domestic helpers etc.). Many mothers don't care about a GDP number from a statistics office, they care about their children, and do not want to outsource their parenting. With a greying population, the economy will need more children that can replace retired workers in the future; that makes raising children properly a priority (particularly in the first five years of life). The majority of young people with young children cannot afford to hire caregivers themselves, and would have to rely on young volunteers or low-paid assistants.

According to later IMF data, the female "labor-force participation rate" for paid work in Japan did rise from 63 percent in 2012 to 74 percent in 2023, but estimates of the added contribution to GDP were not very large. The explanation is most probably that while many Japanese women do work in paid jobs, they often work part-time or in non-regular jobs, with lower pay and shorter hours; in Japan there is still a large gender pay gap). According to the OECD Gender Dashboard, Japan's gender pay gap slightly widened from 21.3% in 2022 to 22% in 2023, while the OECD average stabilized around 11%. As a result, Japan ranks 35th out of 36 OECD countries in terms of pay equity.

According to the International Labour Organization (ILO), about 75.6 million domestic workers are employed in the world, mostly women and migrants, representing 4.5% of all workers (among every 22 workers, one worker is a domestic worker). In terms of their social status, domestic workers remain largely "undervalued, underprotected, and underrepresented". In 2021, the ILO estimated that 81% of all domestic workers were "informally" employed. They are mainly servants of wealthy people and the professional middle classes.

=== Leftwing critiques ===
The laments and revolts of women about their domestic roles have a very lengthy history, but the modern theoretical discourse about women's unpaid household labour originated among the European, British, and North American Left at the beginning of the 1970s. Some of the main leftwing criticisms of SNA concepts are that:

1. SNA aggregates (i) hide the labour-exploitation of the workers and farmers who produce the world's wealth and who pay the major part of government taxes, as well as (ii) obscure the incomes from various types of profits and their sources, in the SNA core accounts; (iii) it is not clear in the SNA core accounts, what the real magnitudes of taxes are which are levied on different types of economic activity and who pays the taxes. In this respect, the SNA concepts are (allegedly) at odds with economic relations in the real world.
2. SNA aggregates hide the sources and growth of economic inequality among the social classes of a country and between countries, in terms of disparities in income, wealth and consumption.
3. Some of the accounting concepts used in SNA are (allegedly) unreal, incoherent, misleading or non-observable (and therefore scientifically not verifiable or provable). For example, the measures of capital services, housing services and the incomes of the financial sector (banking, investment finance and funds management, insurance, real estate).
4. To make better sense of the economy in the real world, a different theoretical perspective on the new value added or value product and on capital accumulation is needed, and the official statistics need to be re-aggregated, contextualized and combined with other data.
5. The distinctions drawn in SNA to define income from production and property income are rather capricious or eclectic, obscuring thereby the different components and sources of realized surplus value (profit, interest, rent, tax, fees, royalties, honorariums, certain net capital gains and subsidy receipts); the categories are said to be based on an inconsistent view of newly created value, conserved value, and transferred value.
6. The SNA aggregate "compensation of employees" does not make explicit the difference between pre-tax and post-tax wage income. It may include the income of higher corporate officers, the value of stock options and profit sharing. It does not separately show deferred income (employee and employer contributions to social insurance and retirement schemes) and other labour costs. The concept of "compensation of employees" would suggest that workers' total income from work is equal to the labour cost of their employers. Government expenditure on social transfers (social wage income) by type is recorded in SNA core accounts, but the recipients are invisible. Thus, it is argued, the SNA accounts have to be substantially re-aggregated, to obtain a true picture of workers' incomes generated and distributed in the economy.
7. In SNA-type accounts, there is lack of integrated statistical information about the financial sector (banking, investment finance, funds management, insurance and real estate) and a lack of interest in stock-flow consistent accounting. Even US government statisticians admit frankly that "Unfortunately, the finance sector is one of the more poorly measured sectors in national accounts". The financial sector is nowadays the biggest player in international transactions, and strongly influences the developmental path of the world economy, through international financing/directing investment and through assets/funds management. Yet oddly it is precisely this leading sector in the world economy for which systematic, regular, comprehensive, and comparable data sets are not available. The appetite for data by the financial sector itself is far greater than its supply.
8. When the SNA core accounts were originally created, their design was heavily influenced by the Keynesian economics of demand management for which they were supposed to provide metrics and indicators. But this design is now regarded as outdated, because (i) the structure of the economy today is very different from what it was in Keynes's time, (ii) there are many new groups of SNA data users, and (iii) data needs and data use have changed. It is true that SNA has revised the designs, and added new modules across time to provide for new possible measures for new variables, but the basic SNA structure still remains the same, and is rarely questioned.

One result of the SNA accounting concepts is that workers' earnings are overstated in the production account, since the account shows the total labor costs to the employer rather than the "factor income" which workers actually receive at the time. If one is interested in what incomes workers – the people who produce the wealth – actually get, how much they own, or how much they borrow, SNA national accounts may not provide the required information, or a special disaggregate analysis may be necessary to find that out (in the US, the NIPA's and BLS data provide more details about workers' incomes). At the same time, total business profits are understated in the production account, because true profit income in a country is larger than operating surplus. The most important reason is that many profits fall outside the SNA-defined production boundary of the production account. Ten specific aspects can be mentioned:

1. Depreciation write-downs and various subsidies typically contain elements of profit, for example because of government incentive programs for business enterprises (accelerated write-downs, tax exemptions etc.). These profits are not included in operating surplus.
2. The value of economic depreciation (consumption of fixed capital) is usually larger than the value of actual depreciation of the fixed capital stock in business accounting (especially in the presence of price inflation). This reduces the size of net operating surplus, as the residual item in the production account.
3. Profits on land sales, natural resource depletion and subsoil rents are traditionally excluded from operating surplus, because they fall outside the SNA production boundary — this is changing somewhat with the adoption of SNA 2025.
4. Many profits on asset transactions and capital gains are conceptually excluded from operating surplus, because they are not regarded as a component of gross value added but as property income. In other words, they fall outside the SNA production boundary.
5. The component of net profit receipts/payments in foreign transactions which is included in GNP and GNI, is excluded in GDP (for some countries, their net gains or losses of profit money through foreign transactions can be quite large). Thus, GDP statistics neither identify nor include profits received from foreign countries and profits transmitted to foreign countries.
6. The FISIM approach to the net interest receipts of banks means that the contribution of the banking industry to operating surplus is understated.
7. Total bank profits are never stated in the SNA production account, although commercial banks — like many other financial institutions and companies — also make profits from property income (from asset trades, dividends, securities, derivatives, foreign exchange and properties they own). The reason is that these bank profits are excluded by the SNA production boundary.
8. The "compensation of employees" aggregate includes remuneration in the form of various types of profit-sharing for employees, and the value of stock options for corporate officers. These items are excluded from operating surplus.
9. Profits from some types of transactions (e.g. illegal sales of goods and services, sales of household goods and services, and the resale of used goods) are not accounted for at all. Such items are typically difficult to measure, or they are conceptually excluded.
10. A fraction of profit receipts is routed to tax havens, and is not registered or declared in the resident country of the owners (see also profit shifting). A 2002 official guideline exists which advises a statistical adjustment to operating surplus for business income not reported to tax authorities, but such an adjustment does not necessarily fully capture all underreported business income.

Lequiller & Blades (2014) state clearly that although SNA operating surplus "is the principal measure of firms’ performance in terms of operating profits", profits and operating surplus "are not be confused", because they are actually quite different quantities.

SNA statisticians acknowledge that alternative measures of gross product, income/expenditure, capital accounts and external transactions accounts are always possible. Considerable opportunities exist for researchers to reaggregate/rework existing official SNA statistics, to create their own alternative measures for their own analyses and interpretations. However, the SNA statistical framework is designed primarily to provide standard, comparable measures, not "non-standard measures" (or all sorts of non-standard interpretations) which may or may not be valid in specific situations. Sometimes NSO's themselves produce "non-standard" data sets alongside standard data sets, because government departments request such data for a particular project (it is less likely, in this case, that the non-standard data sets would be published like other official statistics, except that perhaps some data series are cited in the project report).

A few examples of an alternative "non-standard" approach are:

- Alan Freeman's Marxist national accounts group.
- Anwar Shaikh’s classical economics research program.
- The Distributional National Accounts (DINA) framework pioneered by Thomas Piketty, Emmanuel Saez, and Gabriel Zucman. The DINA approach combines tax records, household survey data and national accounts data, to show the real distribution of national income for different income groups. In the DINA design, the sum of individual incomes aligns with standard SNA macroeconomic aggregates, providing a consistent and comprehensive picture of income distribution.
- Steve Keen’s post-Keynesian approach, featuring the stock-flow consistent Minsky model and Ravel model of money, credit and debts in the macroeconomy.
- The International Student Initiative for Pluralist Economics has supporters in many different countries around the world.

The SNA 2025 manual provides a more detailed conceptual structure to account for the transactions of labour and employment, and it creates the option for extra satellite accounts for labour variables. Future SNA satellite accounts may address some of the leftwing concerns raised, via satellite accounts, on topics such as labor inputs, income distribution and activities of the financial sector.

=== Green alternatives ===
Originally, SNA was designed to provide standard, internationally comparable measures for the magnitudes and changes in national income, output, spending, capital formation and external transactions. All of these indicators are essential to understand the causes and patterns of economic growth, and to provide insight about economic trends. However, that approach is now often deemed to be inadequate (and for some, totally wrongheaded — see for example degrowth), because it leaves out crucial variables, such as environmental variables which impact on the whole economy.

The technical discussions about the inclusion of environmental variables in SNA accounts have carried on for more than half a century since the 1972 Limits to growth report of the Club of Rome. Nowadays a very large scientific literature exists about the subject. However, for many years it proved difficult to reach (i) a workable international consensus about (ii) a feasible SNA methodology, (iii) to create meaningful environmental accounts that could be (iv) international standard SNA accounts which are both (v) useful for policymaking and (vi) internationally comparable (keeping in mind the great diversity of environmental conditions in 200+ different countries and territories) while (vii) maintaining the continuity of SNA core accounts. Given that a very large amount of data is already being collected about the environment, the central issue for SNA statisticians became what specific contribution SNA accounting could usefully add to the total statistical picture of the natural environment that was emerging.

Ten sorts of environmentalist criticisms were made of alleged deficiencies in SNA accounts. Most of these criticisms were about things that were traditionally not accounted for by SNA, but which (it was argued) ought to be accounted for as a standard procedure.

1. In general, SNA traditionally did not account for most of natural environment (the land, the seas and oceans, the polar ice caps, the biosphere, and the atmosphere) which contains and supports the whole economy, and from which resources are extracted.
2. SNA's approach to the valuation of goods, services and assets did not recognize that many environmental variables require a different valuation approach, or a different cost/benefit approach with a different logic.
3. SNA did not account systematically for existing stocks of renewable and non-renewable resources, the use of those resources, and the value of their depletion.
4. SNA did not account for the value of many environmental functions and ecosystem services which provide essential supports for human production, consumption and habitats.
5. SNA did not include environmental "externalities" (such as the social costs of pollution) as part of the economy, so that national accounts overstate the net benefits of economic activity for enterprises as against true costs for communities.
6. SNA did not explicitly account for the costs that result from environmental degradation, and the costs of recovery from environmental damage.
7. SNA did not provide adequate data to understand, monitor and evaluate what is required for sustainable economic growth or green growth.
8. SNA lacked standard satellite accounts which link economic activity to physical resource flows, pollution impacts, and ecosystem changes.
9. SNA's concept of value did not include cultural values or any other valuations than what can be expressed in money-units. Spiritual and social dimensions of nature are absent in SNA reports.
10. In general, SNA (allegedly) sends out the wrong message about the macroeconomic future for humanity, if it does not account properly for the natural environment (the latter which contains the economy, and is a primary source of its wealth).

Each of these ten concerns was elaborated and debated in much more detail by many different researchers. However, dealing with this large international scientific discussion goes beyond the scope of this article. Simply said, across the last half century, the SNA framework has gradually recognized environmental concepts and methods of environmental accounting, and integrated them in the SNA accounting framework. But even if the concepts are now present, there may not be complete agreement ýet about the appropriate measurement techniques to obtain empirical estimates for the concepts.

The development of SNA environmental accounting standards can be briefly sketched as follows:

- SNA 1968 did not yet recognize environmental accounting within the SNA framework. Natural capital depletion, environmental degradation, and pollution were still disregarded by the official accounting system. At that time, critics of SNA 1968 highlighted the inconsistency in economic theory between the approach to human-made capital assets and the approach to stocks of natural resources, the latter which seemed to have zero value, because as "non-produced, non-financial assets" they were not accounted for in SNA prior to their extraction and sale. At a meeting in March 1973, the Conference of European Statisticians of the United Nations Economic Commission for Europe (UNECE) first discussed possibilities for creating environmental statistics according to international guidelines. A subsequent CES meeting in Warsaw in October 1973 endorsed the idea of a coherent system of environment statistics. A provisional programme for longterm international work on environment statistics was submitted to the UN Statistical Commission at its 18th session in 1974, and a draft proposal for an international framework was discussed in January 1981. In 1982, the United Nations Environment Program (UNEP) was given the mandate to develop methodological guidelines on environmental accounting. The first official UN plan for an international framework to create environmental statistics was published by the UN in 1984.
- SNA 1993 for the first time introduced the idea of environmental accounting via the creation of satellite accounts. After the Rio Earth Summit in 1992, the new System of Environmental-Economic Accounting (SEEA) was adopted. Chapter XXI of the 1993 SNA manual gave attention to the design of separate environmental-economic accounts as a way to extend analytical capacity, without altering the core SNA accounts. The environmental satellite accounts would show the interactions between the environment and the economy, using concepts and classifications consistent with SNA. SNA 1993 proposed the explicit inclusion of natural resources (such as land, mineral deposits, and subsoil assets) in SNA asset and accumulation accounts. The concept of net domestic product adjusted for resource depletion ("EDP") was also introduced, although it was not formally included in the SNA framework. It was recommended, that environmental degradation and environmental maintenance costs should be accounted for, to enable the calculation of environmental adjustments to the value of standard economic aggregates. In this way, the 1993 SNA provided the first basis for standard, integrated environmental-economic accounting, leading directly to the development of SEEA as a recognized global standard.
- SNA 2008 formally recognized satellite accounts for environmental-economic topics (including material flow accounts, emission and pollution accounts, and energy accounts) and encouraged the use of the parallel System of Environmental-Economic Accounting (SEEA) for detailed environmental accounting. Natural resources were recognized as economic assets (e.g., subsoil assets, land, mineral resources). The SEEA Central Framework was officially adopted as a UN standard by the UNSC at its 43rd session in February 2012. However, there was not yet any provision for the comprehensive treatment of natural capital or ecosystem services.
- SNA 2025 formally recognizes the concepts of natural capital and ecosystem services; it expands the natural asset classifications covering biological resources, mineral and energy resources, and the atmosphere. Depletion of natural resources is now regarded as a production cost, which can be explicitly stated in accumulation and balance sheet accounts. New principles are introduced for classifying different resource rents, identifying rents accruing to legal owners of resources (often governments) and extracting enterprises. Improved classifications for environmental exchanges and reporting are adopted, which enables natural resource transactions and flows to be made more visible in core accounts. The accounting approach to emissions trading schemes, pollution tax, and environmental liabilities (including potential treatment for negative asset values and provisions) is updated. Depletion-adjusted net measures and net wealth calculations methods are provided which are consistent with SNA ownership concepts. There are also new sectoring and classification rules for natural resource ownership, use of resources, and government roles in resource management.

What SNA environmental accounting concretely involves for an NSO, is usefully described for example in a recent text on the subject by Statistics New Zealand. It is quite possible that many environmentalists will still not be satisfied with the worldwide efforts of SNA statisticians, and that environmentalist criticism of SNA hasn't finished yet (see also greenwashing). Nevertheless, there is substantial evidence that a lot of scientific progress has been made across half a century to create standard accounting methods for natural resources. Not all the measurement issues have been resolved yet, but international discussion/consultation is continuing. At least a basic SNA accounting framework for environmental variables now exists.

It remains to be seen to what extent NSO's across the world will include SEEA in their national statistics as a standard practice. Environmental accounting is in principle optional for UN member countries, although in Europe, NSO's are required by EU regulations to compile a few specific modules in SEEA, as a standard practice (air emissions, environmental taxes by type, and material/energy flows). Most high-income countries began to compile SEEA accounts in the 2010s. In early 2025, at least 94 countries had created "at least one SEEA account" within the last five years. Of these 94 countries, 67 countries are said to be compiling and publishing at least one SEEA account "regularly".

=== Statisticians and data limitations ===
==== Accuracy issues ====
Both the strengths and the weaknesses of national accounts are, that they are based on an enormous variety of data sources. The strength consists in the fact that a lot of cross-checking between data sources and data sets can occur, to assess the credibility of the estimates for the bigger picture. In each account, things do have to "add up" correctly, and the different accounts have to be mutually consistent. The weakness is, that the sheer number of inferences made in compiling data sets increases the possibility of data errors, and can make it more difficult to trace the causes of errors.

Statisticians sometimes comment on the limitations of international comparisons using national accounts data, on the ground that in the real world, the SNA estimates are rarely compiled in a truly uniform way – despite appearances to the contrary. People often assume that the data are "precisely accurate", although the data may only be a "best estimate" under the given conditions, or "approximately true" and "indicative". It can happen that the reported percentage change in a macroeconomic variable is equal to the possible margin of error in the statistical estimates for that variable. There is often little official transparency about data errors in national accounts.

Jochen Hartwig once provided evidence to show that "the divergence in growth rates [of real GDP] between the U.S. and the EU since 1997 can be explained almost entirely in terms of changes to deflation methods that have been introduced in the U.S. after 1997, but not – or only to a very limited extent – in Europe".

==== Different stages of development ====
According to Steve McFeely, the chief statistician of the OECD,

“As of 2022, the UN Statistics Division reported that only two thirds of countries worldwide had implemented the 2008 SNA guidelines… posing uncomfortable questions as to what it really means to adopt a statistical standard… only about half of all countries compile their GDP estimates using all three (income, expenditure, and production) approaches. Moreover, only a selection of countries currently compile comprehensive balance sheets that include non-produced non-financial assets, such as natural resources.”

NSO's in the OECD member countries are generally much further ahead with their national accounts than NSO's in many developing countries. Developing countries don't have the same resources, facilities, staffing and socio-political stability that most OECD countries can offer (see World Bank Statistical Performance Indicators (SPI) and the World Bank Statistical Capacity Building site). Consequently, developed and developing countries tend to differ in their priorities for producing national statistics. If 130+ countries did implement SNA 2008, that could also be viewed as an astounding political and mathematical success, given that those countries include the great majority of the world population.

==== Comparability issues ====
The "magic" of national accounts is, that they provide an instant source of detailed international comparisons. Frits Bos states that:

"The miracle of national accounts statistics is that all over the world, very incomplete, imperfect, and partly outdated datasets are transformed into complete, consistent, and up-to-date standardized pictures of national economies. This miracle of the national accounts is often misunderstood".

Critics argue that, on closer inspection, the numbers are often not really so comparable as they are made out to be. The practical result can be that all sorts of easy comparisons are tossed around by policy scientists, which, if the technical story behind the numbers was told, would never be attempted, because the comparisons are scientifically not credible. Had there been better education in the use of economic data, a lot of controversies would probably have been resolved quickly, or they would not occur. The counterargument is, that because countries are applying the same statistical standards and concepts, this already makes an enormous positive difference to data comparability. This positive difference far outweighs the effects of remaining methodological discrepancies in the data of different countries.

==== Data uses and misuses ====
SNA data producers do not have control over how SNA data will be used. NSO's and intergovernmental organizations only control what information is released, how it is released and when it is released. They act in accordance with a legal framework, and follow directives from the officials in charge. The data can be used for purposes which are not valid, or used for purposes which the data were never meant to serve. That is not the fault of SNA producers, but a matter of data awareness, statistical literacy, scientific debate and data user education.

==== Extrapolated estimates ====
SNA data quality has been criticized, on the ground that what pretends to be "economic data" may involve extrapolated estimates using mathematical models, and not direct observations for the relevant variables. These econometric models are designed (sometimes with great ingenuity) to predict what particular data values ought to be, based on sample data for "indicative trends". One can, for example, observe that if variables X, Y, and Z go up, then variable P will go up as well, in a specific proportion. In that case, one may not need to survey P or its components directly, it is sufficient to get available trend data for X, Y, and Z and feed them into a mathematical model, which then predicts what the values for P will be at each interval of time; at a later stage, the estimates from the model can be checked for their accuracy against relevant new data when it becomes available.

Because statistical surveys can be costly or difficult to organize, or because the data has to be produced quickly to meet a deadline, statisticians often try to find cheaper, faster, and more efficient methods to produce the data. They make use of inferences from data that they already have, or from selected data which they can get more easily. Sometimes this procedure can be proved to supply accurate data successfully. But the purist objection to this approach is often that there is a loss in data accuracy and data quality.

- The extrapolated estimates may lack a solid empirical basis, and the tendency is for fluctuations in the magnitudes of variables to be "smoothed out" by the estimation or interpolation procedure.
- An unusual, very large and sudden fluctuation in a variable (for example, effects of the COVID-19 pandemic) may be difficult to predict by a mathematical model, because the model's descriptions assume the future trend will conform to the law of averages and the patterns of the past. An unusual pattern could initially be regarded as a "data error", although it is later concluded that it was real. The statisticians may not be able to track down and prove why an unusual fluctuation occurred, and adjust the figures according to the "most likely hypothesis".
- Without sufficient observational data from direct surveys and real records, many of the statistical inferences made are not truly verifiable. All one can then say about the estimates is, that they are "probably fairly accurate, given previous and other concurrent data."

Statisticians do admit that data errors and inaccuracies are possible, it is an occupational risk and a challenge. It would be preferable to have comprehensive survey data available as a basis for estimation. But they would argue that it is usually possible to find estimation techniques that keep margins of error within acceptable bounds. The real problem may be, that errors can be corrected only quite some time after the publication deadline, in the light of fresh data or additional data (cf. the US Bureau of Labor Statistics controversy in 2025 about large after-the-fact revisions of the monthly employment estimates, which are used as short-term economic indicators).

Modern digital technology and econometric techniques can supply more accurate, and comprehensive quarterly accounts. Yet this still assumes the existence of a large inventory of observational data as the basis for the estimates.

==== Budgetary issues ====
The 2024–2026 budgetary crisis of the United Nations has an impact on statistical work across the UN (cutbacks in staffing and technical assistance services; project delays and the shelving of flagship projects; data quality risks; insufficient funding for reporting, classification upgrades, and outreach), and that affects the entire global statistical community.

If governments refuse to pay for the production of high quality statistics with qualified staff, statisticians can only do what they are able to do, with the techniques and resources they have. Imperfect statistics may be better to have, than no statistics at all.

In the future, digital technology and artificial intelligence will most likely make the production of economic statistics easier, cheaper, faster and better. In particular, artificial intelligence can potentially provide much faster data error detection and error correction. However, artificial intelligence is not a panacea and it may introduce new errors in information systems: "Hundreds of Wikipedia articles may contain AI-generated errors. Editors are working around the clock to stamp them out."

==== Critical attitudes versus demand for data ====
Criticism can always be made of SNA, and that will probably continue. SNA statisticians make criticisms themselves, although they may not do so publicly (because they lack authorization to do so). However, in the end people do want to have comparable macroeconomic data, to understand the proportions and magnitudes of economic situations. This macroeconomic data has to be produced by somebody, and it must be supplied according to annual or quarterly deadlines. When it is published, it can have a strong effect on investment decisions, business activity and government policy. So NSO's and international suppliers of economic statistics are always under pressure to provide data of the highest possible quality, always on time.

If data users are not satisfied with the data they get, they may be able to create their own data sets, starting out from publicly available information supplied by statistical agencies. Behind the published statistical totals, there also exist databases, archives and registers with more detailed information used to compile the totals. With appropriate authorization, it may sometimes be possible to obtain extra data and more detailed information. Usually the NSO staff is willing to help, within the constraints of the relevant laws and rules, and professional protocols.

A great advantage of modern digital technology and digital data storage is, that data users are in principle no longer restricted to just one set of published official SNA accounts — it is technically possible for specialists with a specific research purpose to generate many account variants (or alternative accounts), by reaggregating, rearranging and recalculating digital SNA data in spreadsheets. The old national accounts data can be used to build new national accounts, just like this has been done in the past — but now aided with far better technology. In this sense, Rodney Edvinsson comments that "there is no point in replacing the current System of National Accounts", and that statistical offices should preserve data continuity, but also make accessible "as much disaggregated data as possible, so as to allow alternative constructions of national accounts".

== See also ==
- Accounting identity
- Aggregation problem
- Artificial Intelligence for Environment & Sustainability
- Balance of Payments
- Broad measures of economic progress
- Bureau of Economic Analysis
- Capital account
- Capital accumulation
- Capital formation
- Capital gain
- Chained volume series
- Circular economy
- Classification
- Classification of Individual Consumption by Purpose
- Clark, Colin
- Compensation of employees
- Consumption of fixed capital
- Debits and credits
- Disposable income
- Domar aggregation
- Double counting (accounting)
- Double deficit (economics)
- Double-entry bookkeeping
- Eco-economic decoupling
- Ecological economics
- Econometrics
- Economic development
- Economic forecasting
- Economic growth
- Economic sector
- Environmental economics
- Environmentally extended input–output analysis
- Environmental accounting
- European System of Accounts
- Export performance
- Factor cost
- Factor income
- Final consumption expenditure
- Financial econometrics
- Fiscal gap
- FISIM
- Fixed capital
- Fixed investment
- Forecasting
- Frisch, Ragnar
- Generational accounting
- Goldsmith, Raymond
- Gordon, Robert
- Government final consumption expenditure
- Green accounting
- Green gross domestic product
- Green growth
- Green national product
- Gross Domestic Product
- Gross domestic income
- Gross fixed capital formation
- Gross loan
- Gross National Happiness
- Gross National Income
- Gross national income in the European Union
- Gross National Product
- Gross operating surplus
- Gross Output
- Gross private domestic investment
- Gross value added
- Hicks, John
- China GDP
- History of accounting
- Household
- Household final consumption expenditure
- Household net worth
- Human Development Index
- IMF Balance of Payments Manual
- Important publications in econometrics
- Income distribution
- Input–output model
- Institute of International Finance
- Intellectual capital
- Intermediate consumption
- Inventory
- Kendrick, John Whitefield
- Keynes, John Maynard
- Labor share
- Leontief, Wassily
- Leprechaun economics
- List of countries by GNI per capita growth
- List of countries by real GDP per capita growth
- List of global issues
- List of Latin American and Caribbean countries by GDP (nominal)
- List of national and international statistical services
- List of sovereign states by current account balance
- Macroeconomics
- Maddison, Angus
- Maddison Project
- Market production
- Material Product System
- Meade, James
- Measures of national income and output
- Mitchell, Wesley Clair
- Modified gross national income
- Monetary Financial Institutions
- Nathan, Robert
- National Accounts
- National agencies responsible for GDP measurement
- National income
- National income and product accounts
- National Intangible Capital
- Natural capital accounting
- Net domestic product
- Net (economics)
- Net international investment position
- Net material product
- Net national product
- Net output
- Official statistics
- Operating surplus
- Penn World Table
- Personal income
- Philosophy of accounting
- Primary sector of the economy
- Production (economics)
- Productive and unproductive labour
- Property income
- Quaternary sector of the economy
- Questionnaire
- Real gross domestic product
- Real prices and ideal prices
- Redistribution of income and wealth
- Stone, Richard
- Saving identity
- Savings identity
- Secondary sector of the economy
- Sectoral balances
- Sectoral output
- Shaikh, Anwar
- Kuznets, Simon
- Social accounting
- Social accounting matrix
- Social reserves
- Statistical survey
- Stock and flow
- Sudden stop (economics)
- Survey (human research)
- Survey data collection
- Survey methodology
- Survey of production
- Sustainability accounting
- System of Environmental and Economic Accounting for Water
- System of Integrated Environmental and Economic Accounting
- Tertiary sector of the economy
- Tinbergen, Jan
- United Kingdom National Accounts – The Blue Book
- Value added
- Value product
- Wages and salaries
- Wagner's law
- War finance
