= Chainlink (disambiguation) =

Chainlink is a type of fencing using woven steel. It may also refer to:

- Chains, a series of linked pieces
- Chain linking, a statistical method to consistently combine two indices
- Chainlink cactus, a shrubby cactus found in arid regions of North America
- Chainlink moray eel, a moray eel from the Western Atlantic
- Chainlink (blockchain), a decentralized oracle network which provides data onto blockchains
- Chainlink, a villain in the animated television series Static Shock
- Chain-linked Lewis, a type of lifting device used by stonemasons to lift large stones
- Chain Link (film), a 2008 American drama film

== See also ==
- Chain link fence (disambiguation)
