= Profit (accounting) =

Income distributed to BSC

Stock index chart showing the recovery after the 2020 Stock Market Crash

Profit, in accounting, is an income distributed to the owner in a profitable market production process (business). Profit is a measure of profitability which is the owner's major interest in the income-formation process of market production. There are several profit measures in common use.

Income formation in market production is always a balance between income generation and income distribution. The income generated is always distributed to the stakeholders of production as economic value within the review period. The profit is the share of income formation the owner is able to keep to themselves in the income distribution process. Profit is one of the major sources of economic well-being because it means incomes and opportunities to develop production. The words "income", "profit" and "earnings" are synonyms in this context.

== Other terms ==
Net sales = gross sales – (customer discounts, returns, and allowances)
Gross profit = net sales – cost of goods sold
Operating profit = gross profit – total operating expenses
Net profit = operating profit – taxes – interest
Net profit = net sales – cost of goods sold – operating expense – taxes – interest

== See also ==
- Gross income
- Net profit
- Profitability index
- Rate of return
- Return on assets
- Return on equity
- Rate of profit
- Profit model
- Income statement
