= Classification of Individual Consumption According to Purpose =

United Nations Statistics Division classification

Classification of Individual Consumption According to Purpose (COICOP) is a Reference Classification published by the United Nations Statistics Division that divides the purpose of individual consumption expenditures incurred by three institutional sectors, namely households, non-profit institutions serving households, and general government.

Categories in COICOP generally correspond to categories in the UN's CPC. Division 14 of COICOP corresponds to the Classification of the Purposes of Non-Profit Institutions Serving Households (COPNI); Division 15 of COICOP corresponds to the Classification of the Functions of Government (COFOG).

The classification units are transactions.

COICOP's latest revision is currently available as COICOP 2018.

== Structure ==
=== Structure levels ===
- Structure Level 1: Divisions (two-digit)
- Structure Level 2: Groups (three-digit)
- Structure Level 3: Classes (four-digit)
- Structure Level 4: Subclasses (five-digit)

=== Broad structure ===
01 Food and non-alcoholic beverages

01.1 Food
01.2 Non-alcoholic beverages
01.3 Services for processing primary goods for food and non-alcoholic beverages

02 Alcoholic beverages, tobacco and narcotics

02.1 Alcoholic beverages
02.2 Alcohol production services
02.3 Tobacco
02.4 Narcotics

03 Clothing and footwear

03.1 Clothing
03.2 Footwear

04 Housing, water, electricity, gas and other fuels

04.1 Actual rentals for housing
04.2 Imputed rentals for housing
04.3 Maintenance, repair and security of the dwelling
04.4 Water supply and miscellaneous services relating to the dwelling
04.5 Electricity, gas and other fuels

05 Furnishings, household equipment and routine household maintenance

05.1 Furniture, furnishings, and loose carpets
05.2 Household textiles
05.3 Household appliances
05.4 Glassware, tableware and household utensils
05.5 Tools and equipment for house and garden
05.6 Goods and services for routine household maintenance

06 Health

06.1 Medicines and health products
06.2 Outpatient care services
06.3 Inpatient care services
06.4 Other health services

07 Transport

07.1 Purchase of vehicles
07.2 Operation of personal transport equipment
07.3 Passenger transport services
07.4 Transport services of goods

08 Information and communication

08.1 Information and communication equipment
08.2 Software excluding games
08.3 Information and communication services

09 Recreation, sport and culture

09.1 Recreational durables
09.2 Other recreational goods
09.3 Garden products and pets
09.4 Recreational services
09.5 Cultural goods
09.6 Cultural services
09.7 Newspapers, books and stationery
09.8 Package holidays

10 Education services

10.1 Early childhood and primary education
10.2 Secondary education
10.3 Post-secondary non-tertiary education
10.4 Tertiary education
10.5 Education not defined by level

11 Restaurants and accommodation services

11.1 Food and beverage serving services
11.2 Accommodation services

12 Insurance and financial services

12.1 Insurance
12.2 Financial services

13 Personal care, social protection and miscellaneous goods and services

13.1 Personal care
13.2 Other personal effects
13.3 Social protection
13.9 Other services

14 Individual consumption expenditure of non-profit institutions serving households (NPISHS)

14.1 Housing
14.2 Health
14.3 Recreation and culture
14.4 Education
14.5 Social protection
14.6 Other services

15 Individual consumption expenditure of general government

15.1 Housing
15.2 Health
15.3 Recreation and culture
15.4 Education
15.5 Social protection
