= Net material product =

GDP equivalent for the Comecon countries

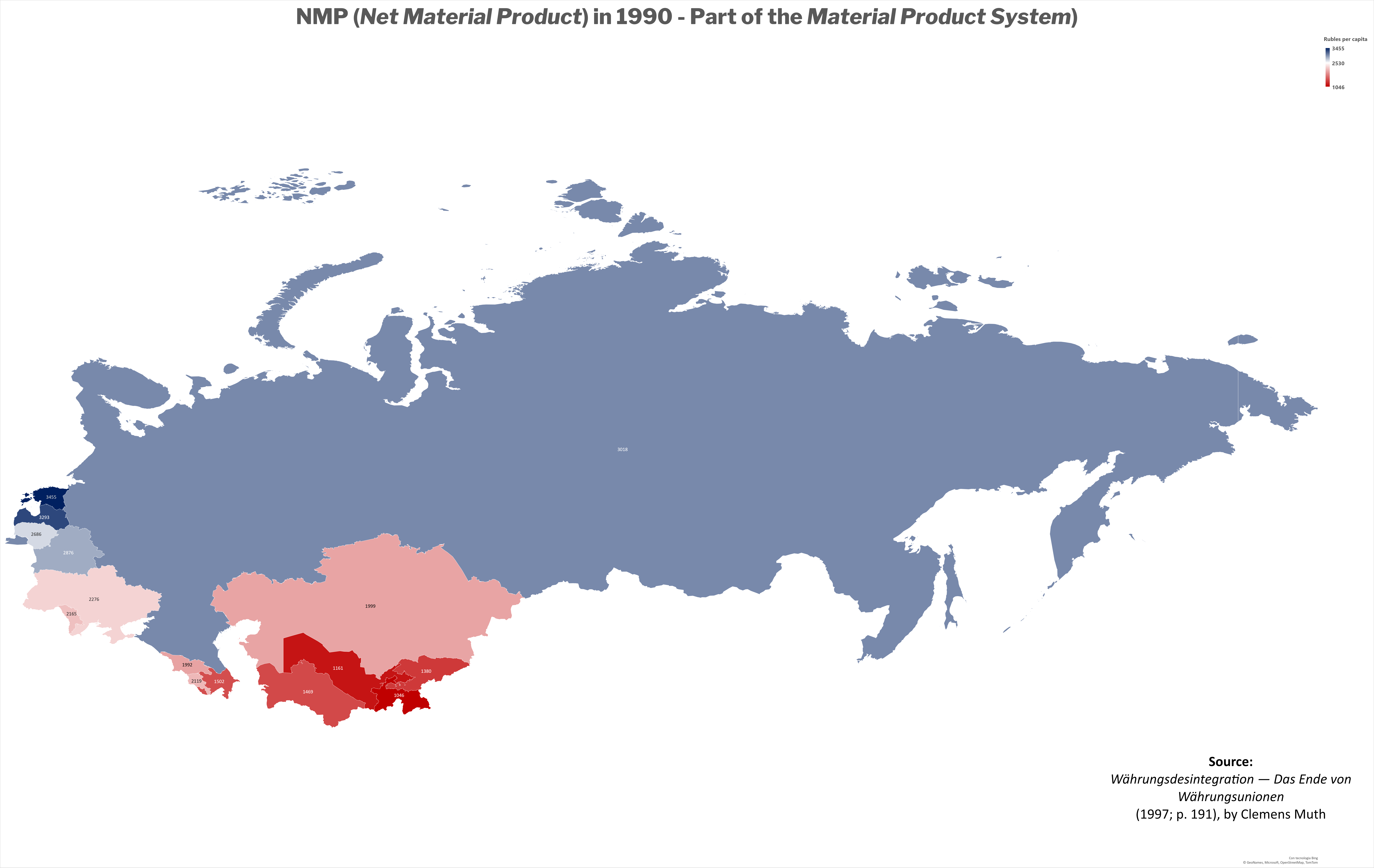
NMP (Net material Product) per capita - USSR 1990.

Net Material Product (NMP) was the main macroeconomic indicator used for monitoring growth in national accounts of socialist countries during the Soviet era. These countries included the USSR and all the Comecon members. NMP is the conceptual equivalent of Gross Domestic Product (GDP) in the United Nations System of National Accounts, although numerically the two measures are calculated differently.

NMP is calculated for the material production sectors only, and excludes most of the service sectors, which are part of GDP. The material production sectors include manufacturing industries, agriculture and forestry, construction, wholesale and retail trade, supply of material inputs, road maintenance, freight transport (but not passenger transport), communication and information services supporting material production, and other material production activities. It is calculated by subtracting the value of all production costs (including the cost of material inputs, depreciation, and labor in production) from the value of output produced in the material production sectors.

For comparison with GDP, it is necessary to add back to NMP the value of fixed asset depreciation (which is not subtracted in GDP calculations) and the total value of all services classified as "non-productive" in the socialist system of national accounts (which are part of GDP). These "non-productive" services include health care, education, housing, public utilities, consumer services, communication in the non-productive sector, passenger transport, financial services (banking, credit, insurance), government services, the defense establishment, and social organizations. The tax components subtracted in the calculation of GDP should also be added back to obtain NMP.

The economic term that corresponds to Net Material Product in Russian is Национальный доход (literally: national income). None of the accepted meanings of national income in English matches the meaning in Russian, and Net Material Product was introduced into English usage as the best alternative.

== GDP and NMP for USSR 1980–1990 ==
GDP began to be calculated in the USSR in 1988, based essentially on the United Nations System of National Accounts. The table compares the new GDP estimates with the traditional NMP numbers (in billions of current rubles). GDP is seen to be 25%–30% higher than NMP due to depreciation and the "non-productive" service sectors included in GDP but not in NMP.

Indicator	1980	1985	1990
GDP	619	777	1000
NMP	462.2	578.5	700.6
NMP in % of GDP	75	74	70

Source: Narodnoye khoziaystvo SSSR 1990, statistical yearbook of the USSR, p. 5.

== NMP growth for Comecon countries ==
Change in NMP (in constant prices) 1980–1990 (in percent of 1980)

Indicator	Bulgaria	Cuba	Czecho- Slovakia	East Germany	Hungary	Mongolia	Poland	Romania	Vietnam	USSR
NMP in 1990 (1980=100)	141	143	117	139	112	156	108	144	153	127

Source: Statistical Yearbook of Comecon Countries 1989, Table 21, p. 59.

== See also ==
- Material Product System
- Productive and unproductive labour
- Value product
