= Material Product System =

System of national accounts used by Eastern Bloc countries

Material Product System (MPS) refers to the system of national accounts used by 16 Communist countries for different lengths of time, including the former Soviet Union and the Eastern Bloc countries (until around 1990), Cuba, China (1952–1992) and several other Asian countries. The MPS has now been replaced by the UNSNA accounts in most countries that used MPS, although some countries such as Cuba and North Korea have continued to use MPS alongside UNSNA-type accounts. Today it is difficult to obtain detailed information about accounting systems which are an alternative to UNSNA, and therefore few people know that such systems exist and have been used by various countries.

== Differences from SNA ==
The main structural differences between MPS and UNSNA are attributable to a different interpretation of newly created value, and of the accumulation of stocks of wealth. Consequently, there are differences in grossing and netting procedures for the main aggregates. In MPS, many services are not regarded as value-adding, and therefore excluded from the total net output. As the name suggests, the MPS aims to measure the annual output of material goods, in contrast with services. In MPS the economy is divided up into three sectors: (1) productive enterprises, (2) the non-productive sphere, and (3) households. Typically the planning authorities also collected comprehensive data on the physical units of products produced. This is normally not the case in conventional national accounts, which measure only the momentary market value of outputs produced.

== Attribution to Marx and Smith ==
The MPS accounts originated in the Soviet Union, around the same time that the first Western attempts were also made to create systematic social accounts (i.e. in the later 1920s and 1930s). Russia already had a strong tradition of statistical analysis, and Lenin had emphasized the importance of statistics. The MPS concepts and methods were influenced by the ideas Karl Marx had about the creation and accumulation of wealth, and about productive and unproductive labour in capitalist society. However, Marx himself never attempted to create any system of social accounts for socialist economies; his own economic categories concerned the capitalist mode of production, and not a socialist economy. Further, the MPS accounts used a definition of "unproductive labor" which was closer to that of Adam Smith than to that of Marx. The MPS standard accounting system was adopted by CMEA countries in 1969.

== Measurement of prices ==
Critics of MPS accounts argue that by providing a lot of detail about the value and physical quantity of tangible products produced, but very little detail about those who depended on that production as consumers, how income, consumer items and capital wealth were truly distributed in the USSR. However, supporters of the system argued that, if many goods and services are supplied to ordinary consumers free of charge, or below cost (a "socialized" component of household income) then valuing consumption expenditures in money prices becomes both difficult and rather meaningless. In that case, it is argued, a more appropriate strategy is to measure what physical goods and services people actually consume, and to what benefits they are entitled. Whatever the case, it is clear that there is a big difference in valuation methods between MPS and UNSNA, since MPS in large part works with administered prices set by the state, whereas UNSNA largely uses (real or imputed) "market" prices (these market prices should not be understood as being necessarily "free market prices" – Post-Keynesian economics has shown that a large proportion of prices in Western countries are in reality also a type of administered prices or regulated prices). For example, if corporations transfer goods and assets between their corporate branches in different countries, they may not value them at market prices at all, but at prices which incur less tax and levies – prompting governments to set rules for how the goods must be valued and priced (see transfer pricing).

== See also ==
- China GDP
- Material product
- Net material product
- Productive and unproductive labour
- Soviet-type economic planning
- UNSNA
- Value product
- Socialist economics
