= FISIM =

FISIM stands for Financial Intermediation Services Indirectly Measured. In the System of National Accounts it is an estimate of the value of the services provided by financial intermediaries, such as banks, for which no explicit charges are made; instead these services are paid for as part of the margin between rates applied to savers and borrowers. The supposition is that savers would receive a lower interest rate and borrowers pay a higher interest rate if all financial services had explicit charges.

One method of calculating it is as the total property income receivable by financial intermediaries minus their total interest payable, excluding the value of any property income receivable from the investment of their own funds, as such income does not arise from financial intermediation.
