= Wages and salaries =

Wages and salaries are the remuneration paid or payable to employees for work performed on behalf of an employer or services provided. Normally, an employer is not permitted to withhold the wages or any part thereof, except as permitted or required by law. Employers are required by law to deduct from wages, commonly termed "withhold", income taxes, social contributions and for other purposes, which are then paid directly to tax authorities, social security authority, etc., on behalf of the employee. Garnishment is a court ordered withholding from wages to pay a debt.

Wages and salaries are typically paid directly to an employee in the form of cash or in a cash equivalent, such as by cheque or by direct deposit into the employee's bank account or an account directed by the employee. Alternatively, all or a part may be paid in various other ways, such as payment in kind in the form of goods or services provided to the employee, such as food and board.

For tax purposes, wages and salaries normally do not include other non-cash benefits received by an employee, such as flights, payment of school fees etc. These are usually referred to as fringe benefits.

In the national accounts, in accordance with the System of National Accounts, wages and salaries are the sum of remuneration paid to employees, including the values of any social contributions, income taxes, etc., payable to employees. For administrative convenience, or due to a legal requirement or some other reason all or a part of such payments may actually be withheld by the employer and paid directly to tax authorities, etc., on behalf of the employee. However, labour-related expenses of a business, such as payroll taxes, pension fund contributions, social insurance schemes, workers' compensation insurance, etc., are not counted as wages and salaries for national accounts purposes. Similar concepts apply to general accounting treatment of labour expenses.

Wages and salaries in cash consist of such amounts payable at regular intervals, such as weekly, monthly or other intervals, including payments by results and piecework payments; plus allowances, such as those for working overtime; plus amounts paid to employees away from work for short periods (e.g., on holiday, sick leave, etc.); plus ad hoc bonuses and similar payments; plus commissions, gratuities and tips received by employees.

Wages and salaries in kind consist of remuneration in the form of goods or services that are not necessary for work and can be used by employees in their own time, and at their own discretion, for the satisfaction of their own needs or wants or those of other members of their households.

== See also ==
- List of countries by average wage
- Sliding wage scale
