= Chain link fence (disambiguation) =

Chain link fence is a type of fencing.

Chain link fence may also refer to:

- "Maschen-Draht-Zaun" ("chain-link fence"), a song by German entertainer Stefan Raab
- "Chain Link Fence", a song by The Go! Team from the album Semicircle
