= Accounting identity =

Mathematical identity in accounting

In accounting, finance and economics, an accounting identity is an equality that must be true regardless of the value of its variables, or a statement that by definition (or construction) must be true. Where an accounting identity applies, any deviation from numerical equality signifies an error in formulation, calculation or measurement.

The term accounting identity may be used to distinguish between propositions that are theories (which may or may not be true, or relationships that may or may not always hold) and statements that are by definition true. Despite the fact that the statements are by definition true, the underlying figures as measured or estimated may not add up due to measurement error, particularly for certain identities in macroeconomics.

== Description ==
The most basic identity in accounting is that the balance sheet must balance, that is, that assets must equal the sum of liabilities (debts) and equity (the value of the firm to the owner). In its most common formulation it is known as the accounting equation:

Assets = Liabilities + Equity

where debt includes non-financial liabilities. Balance sheets are commonly presented as two parallel columns, each summing to the same total, with the assets on the left, and liabilities and owners' equity on the right. The parallel columns of Assets and Equities are, in effect, two views of the same set of business facts.

The balance of the balance sheet reflects the conventions of double-entry bookkeeping, by which business transactions are recorded. In double-entry bookkeeping, every transaction is recorded by paired entries, and typically a transaction will result in two or more pairs of entries. The sale of product, for example, would record both a receipt of cash (or the creation of a trade receivable in the case of an extension of credit to the buyer) and a reduction in the inventory of goods for sale; the receipt of cash or a trade receivable is an addition to revenue, and the reduction in goods inventory is an addition to expense. In this case, an "expense" is the "expending" of an asset. Thus, there are two pairs of entries: an addition to revenue balanced by an addition to cash; a subtraction from inventory balanced by an addition to expense. The cash and inventory accounts are asset accounts; the revenue and expense accounts will close at the end of the accounting period to affect equity.

Double-entry bookkeeping conventions are employed as well for the National Accounts. Economic concepts such as national product, aggregate income, investment and savings, as well as the balance of payments and balance of trade, involve accounting identities. The application of double-entry bookkeeping conventions in measuring aggregate economic activity derives from the recognition that: every purchase is also a sale, every payment made translates income received, and every act of lending also an act of borrowing.

Here the term identity is a mathematical identity or a logical tautology, since it defines an equivalence which does not depend on the particular values of the variables.

== Identities in accounting ==
Accounting has a number of identities in common usage, and since many identities can be decomposed into others, no comprehensive listing is possible.

=== Inter-period identities ===
Accounting identities also apply between accounting periods, such as changes in cash balances. For example:

Cash at beginning of period + Changes in cash during period = Cash at end of period

=== Value of an asset ===
Any asset recorded in a firm's balance sheet will have a carrying value. By definition, the carrying value must equal the historic cost (or acquisition cost) of the asset, plus (or minus) any subsequent adjustments in the value of the asset, such as depreciation.

Carrying value = Historic cost + Change in value

== Economics ==
In economics, there are numerous accounting identities.

=== Balance of payments ===
One of the most commonly known is the balance of payments identity, where:

Current Account Surplus + Capital Account Surplus = Increase in Official Reserve Account

A common problem with the balance of payments identity is that, due to measurement error, the balance of payments may not total correctly. For example, in the context of the identity that the sum of all countries' current accounts must be zero, The Economist magazine has noted that "In theory, individual countries’ current-account deficits and surpluses should cancel each other out. But because of statistical errors and omissions they never do."

=== Gross domestic product ===
The basic equation for gross domestic product is also an identity, and is sometimes referred to as the National Income Identity:

GDP = consumption + investment + government spending + (exports − imports).

This identity holds because investment refers to the sum of intended and unintended investment, the latter being unintended accumulations of inventories; unintended inventory accumulation necessarily equals output produced (GDP) minus intended uses of that output—consumption, intended investment in machinery, inventories, etc., government spending, and net exports.

=== Investment ===
Investment = Fixed investment + Inventory investment

Gross investment – Depreciation = Net investment

=== Banking ===
A key identity that is used in explaining the multiple expansion of the money supply is:

Bank assets = Bank liabilities + Owners' equity

Here the liabilities include deposits of customers, against which reserves often must be held.

== See also ==
Identity (mathematics)

Accounting

- Double entry accounting

General

- DuPont analysis

Business

- Balance sheet
- Cash flow statement
- Income statement

Economics

- Balance of payments
- Equation of exchange
- National income and product accounts
- The profit equation
- Savings identity
- Sectoral balances
