= Respondent error =

In survey sampling, respondent error refers to any error introduced into the survey results due to respondents providing untrue or incorrect information. It is a type of systemic bias.

Language and educational issues can lead to a misunderstanding of the question by the respondent, or similarly, a misunderstanding of the response by the surveyor. Recall bias can lead to misinformation based on a respondent misrecalling the facts in question. Social desirability bias can lead a respondent to respond in a fashion that they think is correct or better or less embarrassing, rather than providing true and honest responses.
