= UNdata =

- Creator: United Nations Statistics Division
- Website: data.un.org
- Registration: No
- Launched: February 2008
- Current status: Active

UNdata is an Internet search engine, retrieving data series from statistical databases provided by the United Nations System. UNdata was launched in February 2008. It is a product of the United Nations Statistics Division (UNSD) developed in partnership with Statistics Sweden and the Swedish International Development Cooperation Agency (SIDA).

UNdata allows searching and downloading a variety of statistical resources covering the following areas: Education, Employment, Energy, Environment, Food and Agriculture, Health, Human Development, Industry, Information and Communication Technology, National Accounts, Population, Refugees, Trade and Tourism.

UNdata has been featured in CNET TV and listed as Best Of The Internet in PC Magazine.

UNdata is listed in the Registry of Research Data Repositories re3data.org.

== PET Lab ==
UNSD is the lead body for the Privacy-Enhancing Technologies Lab (PET Lab). The PET Lab together with the ITU AI for Good programme jointly organize the Trustworthy AI standardization PET programme of work.
