= Market production =

In a general sense, market production refers to the production of a product or service which is intended for sale at a money-price in a market. The product or service in principle has to be tradable for money.

However, in national accounts the term has a more specific meaning, because many producing organizations exist in the economy which either do not produce for any distinct market, or which partly produce for the market, and partly don't. These are non-commercial or partly commercial organizations, which can be mainly self-funded, but not-for-profit, or mainly funded by sources other than their own revenue. Statisticians therefore have to define "market production" much more exactly, in order to be able to separate out market production in a consistent way, and distinguish it from non-market production. If they would be unable to do so, they would be unable to measure market production in a meaningful and consistent way.

In the United Nations System of National Accounts (UNSNA), market production includes all those producing units who sell most or all of their output at prices which are "economically significant" (i.e. at prices which influence how much producers are willing to supply, and how much purchasers wish to buy). For example, a school or a university would be a market producer if it charges fees which are based on their production costs, and which are sufficiently high to influence demand for their services. The school or university would have to generate a definite operating surplus (profit) or loss.

Non-market production, by contrast, includes producing units which provide most of their output to others either free of charge, or at prices which are "not economically significant" - for example, government institutions, households, or non-profit institutions. If prices are charged for services supplied, these prices mostly do not change in response to fluctuations in supply or demand (as in the case of administered prices) or else they are prices which do not cover the cost of supply. The organizations in this category do not provide a financial gain (a source of income or profit) to the units which control or manage them. In addition, they depend mostly on funding other than sales revenue to cover their costs of production, or of other activities they might carry out (for example, funding such as taxes, authorized levies, subsidies, subscriptions, donations etc.). Non-market production can also include subsistence production where producers produce something for their own use, rather than trading what they produce for something else.

== See also ==
- Market (economics)
