= Chain linking =

Statistical method

Chain linking is a statistical method, defined by the Organisation for Economic Co-operation and Development as:

Joining together two indices that overlap in one period by rescaling one of them to make its value equal to that of the other in the same period, thus combining them into single time series. More complex methods may be used to link together indices that overlap by more than period.

— Glossary of Statistical Terms, OECD

Chain linking is popularly used with gross domestic product/gross national income data, to measure changes over time, giving a chained volume series.
