= Chained volume series =

Series of economic data from successive years

A chained volume series is a series of economic data (such as GDP, GNP or similar kinds of data) from successive years, put in real (or constant, i.e. inflation- and deflation-adjusted) terms by computing the aggregate value of the measure (e.g. GDP or GNP) for each year using the prices of the preceding year, and then 'chain linking' the data together to obtain a time-series of figures from which the effects of price changes (i.e., monetary inflation or deflation) have, at least in theory, been removed. In other words, from the raw (i.e. nominal) GDP or GNP data, which reflect changes in both production volume and prices, a series is obtained where the changes between years reflect only changes in production volume (and not changes in price).

The year-by-year chain linking method differs from some other techniques for compensating for monetary inflation and deflation that are used in economics, such as the consumer price index. The consumer price index uses the observed price of a set 'market basket' of goods and services in any two given years to determine the relative prices in those two years; it does not rely on a cumulative accounting of changes in the intervening years. The consumer price index is thus an example of a fixed-weight compensation method; fixed weight methods relate prices in all years to some single base year. The problem is that the compensation factor derived from any index depends on the weights given to the various items in the market-basket — or the proportions of each item in whatever aggregate amount is being looked at — and the weights that were correct for one time may not be correct for other times. For example, in 1850 the price of horse-fodder would have been an important component of overall price levels, but now it is not. If one is comparing 1850 price levels to present ones, then, the question arises, what weight to give to horse-fodder? It is difficult to know. The chain linking method attempts to avoid this conundrum by never making large leaps in time.

The United Kingdom presently uses chain linking to put its national accounts aggregates (e.g., GDP, GNP) in constant-price terms. From the GDP figures thus obtained can be derived an implicit GDP deflator which gives a good indication of inflation or deflation in the economy as a whole.

The United States switched to using chained volume series in 1996 as its featured method of putting GDP in constant-price terms. Before that it had used the Laspeyres index, a fixed-weight method.
