= Gross domestic income =

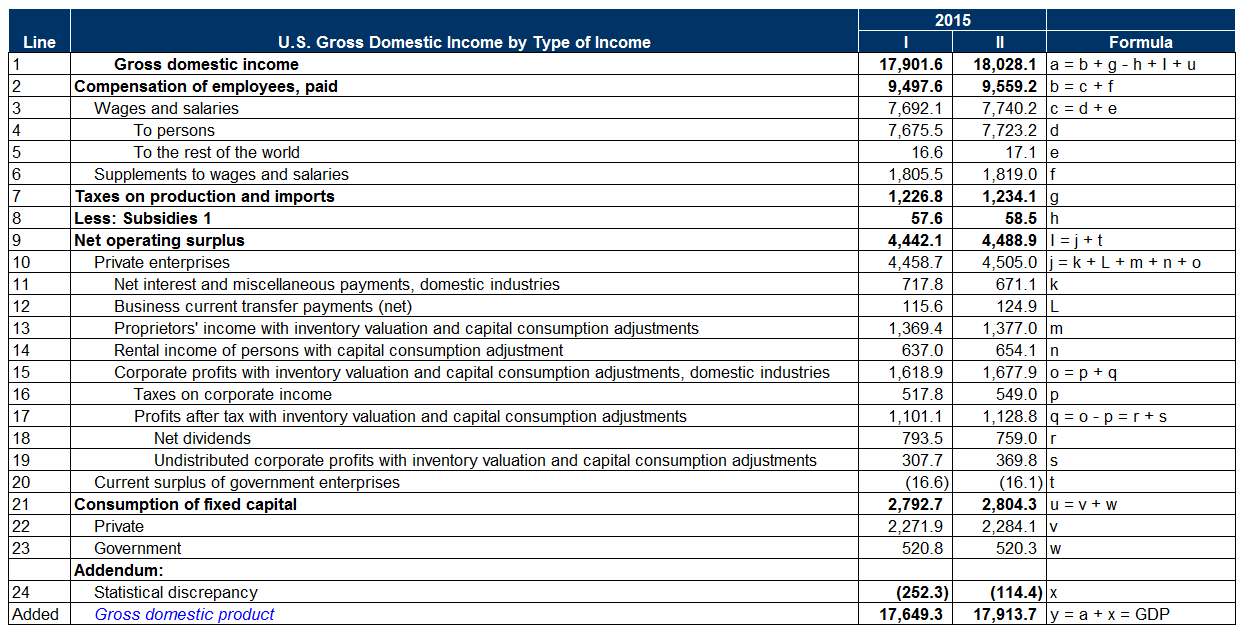
U.S gross domestic income computed on the income basis

The Gross Domestic Income (GDI) is the total factor income payment done by all residents within a country. It includes the sum of all wages, profits, and indirect taxes, minus subsidies. Nominal GDI and Nominal gross domestic product (GDP) are exactly identical, yet real GDI and real gross domestic product (Real GDP) are different; real GDP is calculated by keeping the price of each domestic production constant between two years, while real GDI is calculated by deflating GDP with the purchasing power of money. As such, real GDI introduces a trade balance term; real GDI increases when the price of imports goes down or when the price of exports goes up, while real GDP is not affected.

For oil-export-dependent economies, there could be substantial differences between real GDP and real GDI, due the effect of oil price volatility on the purchasing power in those countries.

In the United States National Income and product accounts, the word GDI is used to define GDP calculated with income data rather than expenditure data. The difference between the two figure is known as a statistical discrepancy.
