= Classification of the Functions of Government =

United Nations Statistics Division classification

Classification of the Functions of Government (COFOG) is a classification defined by the United Nations Statistics Division. These functions are designed to be general enough to apply to the government of different countries. The accounts of each country in the United Nations are presented under these categories. The value of this is that the accounts of different countries can be compared.

01 - General public services	01.1 - Executive and legislative organs, financial and fiscal affairs, external affairs
01 - General public services	01.2 - Foreign economic aid
01 - General public services	01.3 - General services
01 - General public services	01.4 - Basic research
01 - General public services	01.5 - R&D General public services
01 - General public services	01.6 - General public services n.e.c.
01 - General public services	01.7 - Public debt transactions
01 - General public services	01.8 - Transfers of a general character between different levels of government
02 – Defence	02.1 - Military defence
02 – Defence	02.2 - Civil defence
02 – Defence	02.3 - Foreign military aid
02 – Defence	02.4 - R&D Defence
02 – Defence	02.5 - Defence n.e.c.
03 - Public order and safety	03.1 - Police services
03 - Public order and safety	03.2 - Fire-protection services
03 - Public order and safety	03.3 - Law courts
03 - Public order and safety	03.4 – Prisons
03 - Public order and safety	03.5 - R&D Public order and safety
03 - Public order and safety	03.6 - Public order and safety n.e.c.
04 - Economic affairs	04.1 - General economic, commercial and labour affairs
04 - Economic affairs	04.2 - Agriculture, forestry, fishing and hunting
04 - Economic affairs	04.3 - Fuel and energy
04 - Economic affairs	04.4 - Mining, manufacturing and construction
04 - Economic affairs	04.5 – Transport
04 - Economic affairs	04.6 – Communication
04 - Economic affairs	04.7 - Other industries
04 - Economic affairs	04.8 - R&D Economic affairs
04 - Economic affairs	04.9 - Economic affairs n.e.c.
05 - Environmental protection	05.1 - Waste management
05 - Environmental protection	05.2 - Waste water management
05 - Environmental protection	05.3 - Pollution abatement
05 - Environmental protection	05.4 - Protection of biodiversity and landscape
05 - Environmental protection	05.5 - R&D Environmental protection
05 - Environmental protection	05.6 - Environmental protection n.e.c.
06 - Housing and community amenities	06.1 - Housing development
06 - Housing and community amenities	06.2 - Community development
06 - Housing and community amenities	06.3 - Water supply
06 - Housing and community amenities	06.4 - Street lighting
06 - Housing and community amenities	06.5 - R&D Housing and community amenities
06 - Housing and community amenities	06.6 - Housing and community amenities n.e.c.
07 – Health	07.1 - Medical products, appliances and equipment
07 – Health	07.2 - Outpatient services
07 – Health	07.3 - Hospital services
07 – Health	07.4 - Public health services
07 – Health	07.5 - R&D Health
07 – Health	07.6 - Health n.e.c.
08 - Recreation, culture and religion	08.1 - Recreational and sporting services
08 - Recreation, culture and religion	08.2 - Cultural services
08 - Recreation, culture and religion	08.3 - Broadcasting and publishing services
08 - Recreation, culture and religion	08.4 - Religious and other community services
08 - Recreation, culture and religion	08.5 - R&D Recreation, culture and religion
08 - Recreation, culture and religion	08.6 - Recreation, culture and religion n.e.c.
09 – Education	09.1 - Pre-primary and primary education
09 – Education	09.2 - Secondary education
09 – Education	09.3 - Post-secondary non-tertiary education
09 – Education	09.4 - Tertiary education
09 – Education	09.5 - Education not definable by level
09 – Education	09.6 - Subsidiary services to education
09 – Education	09.7 - R&D Education
09 – Education	09.8 - Education n.e.c.
10 - Social protection	10.1 - Sickness and disability
10 - Social protection	10.2 - Old age
10 - Social protection	10.3 – Survivors
10 - Social protection	10.4 - Family and children
10 - Social protection	10.5 – Unemployment
10 - Social protection	10.6 – Housing
10 - Social protection	10.7 - Social exclusion n.e.c.
10 - Social protection	10.8 - R&D Social protection
10 - Social protection	10.9 - Social protection n.e.c.
