= United Nations Statistics Division =

Division of United Nations Department of Economic and Social Affairs

The United Nations Statistics Division (UNSD), formerly the United Nations Statistical Office, serves under the United Nations Department of Economic and Social Affairs (DESA) as the central mechanism within the Secretariat of the United Nations to supply the statistical needs and coordinating activities of the global statistical system. The Division is overseen by the United Nations Statistical Commission, established in 1947, as the apex entity of the global statistical system and highest decision making body for coordinating international statistical activities. It brings together the Chief Statisticians from member states from around the world.

The Division compiles and disseminates global statistical information, develops standards and norms for statistical activities, and supports countries' efforts to strengthen their national statistical systems.

The Division regularly publishes data updates, including the Statistical Yearbook and World Statistics Pocketbook, and books and reports on statistics and statistical methods. Many of the Division's databases are also available at its site (See below), as electronic publications and data files in the form of CD-ROMs, diskettes and magnetic tapes, or as printed publications. UNdata, a new internet-based data service for the global user community brings UN statistical databases within easy reach of users through a single entry point. Users can search and download a variety of statistical resources of the UN system.

== Directors ==
Including acting directors:

Name	Nationality	Term
Shantanu Mukherjee (acting)	India	1 September 2025 – present
Ronald Jansen (acting)	Netherlands	1 July – 31 August 2025
Stefan Schweinfest	Germany	1 July 2014 – 30 June 2025
Stefan Schweinfest (acting)	Germany	April 2013 – 30 June 2014
Paul Cheung	Singapore	2004–2012
Willem de Vries (acting)	Netherlands	2002–2004
Hermann Habermann	United States	1994–2002
William Seltzer	United States	1986–1994
Yoshimasa Kurabayashi	Japan	1982–1986
Svein Nordbotten	Norway	1979–1982
Simon Goldberg	Canada	1972–1979
Patrick J. Loftus	United Kingdom	1962–1972
William R. Leonard	United States	1948–1962
Harry Campion	United Kingdom	1947

== Topics ==
- Economy
  - Industry Statistics
  - Energy Statistics
  - Trade Statistics
  - ...
- Environment
  - Environment Statistics
  - ...
- Development Indicators
  - Sustainable Development Goal indicators
- ...

=== PET Lab ===
UNSD leads the Privacy-Enhancing Technologies Lab (PET Lab), which in turn drives TrustworthyAI together with ITU.

== See also ==
- Classification of the Functions of Government
- International Standard Industrial Classification
- UN M49
- United Nations geoscheme
- List of national and international statistical services
- Committee for the Coordination of Statistical Activities
- United Nations
- United Nations Group of Experts on Geographical Names
