= Surplus product =

Economic concept theorised by Karl Marx

Surplus product (German: Mehrprodukt) is a concept theorised by Karl Marx in his critique of political economy. Roughly speaking, it is the extra goods produced above the amount needed for a community of workers to survive at its current standard of living. Marx first began to work out his idea of surplus product in his 1844 notes on James Mill's Elements of political economy.

Notions of "surplus produce" have been used in economic thought and commerce for a long time (notably by the Physiocrats), but in Das Kapital, Theories of Surplus Value and the Grundrisse Marx gave the concept a central place in his interpretation of economic history. Nowadays the concept is mainly used in Marxian economics, political anthropology, cultural anthropology, and economic anthropology.

The frequent translation of the German "Mehr" as "surplus" makes the term "surplus product" somewhat inaccurate, because it suggests to English speakers that the product referred to is "unused", "not needed", or "redundant", while most accurately "Mehr" means "more" or "added"—thus, "Mehrprodukt" refers really to the additional or "excess" product produced. In German, the term "Mehrwert" most literally means value-added, a measure of net output, (though, in Marx's particular usage, it means the surplus-value obtained from the use of capital, i.e. it refers to the net addition to the value of capital owned).

== Classical economics ==
In Theories of Surplus Value, Marx says in classical economics the "surplus" referred to an excess of gross income over cost, which implied that the value of goods sold was greater than the value of the costs involved in producing or supplying them. That was how you could "make money". The surplus represented a net addition to the stock of wealth. A central theoretical question was then to explain the kinds of influences on the size of the surplus, or how the surplus originated, since that had important consequences for the funds available for re-investment, tax levies, the wealth of nations, and (especially) economic growth.

This was theoretically a confusing issue, because sometimes it seemed that a surplus arose out of clever trading in already existing assets, while at other times it seemed that the surplus arose because new value was added in production. In other words, a surplus could be formed in different ways, and one could get rich either at the expense of someone else, or by creating more wealth than there was before, or by a mixture of both. This raised the difficult problem of how, then, one could devise a system for grossing and netting incomes & expenditures to estimate only the value of the new additional wealth created by a country. For centuries, there was little agreement about that, because rival economists each had their own theory about the real sources of wealth-creation—even if they might agree that the value of production must equal the sum of the new revenue which it generates for the producers.

Political economy was originally considered to be a "moral science", which arose out of the moral and juridical ambiguities of trading processes themselves. It was analytically difficult to take the step from the incomes of individuals, the immediate source of which was rather obvious, to a consideration of the incomes of groups, social classes and nations. Somehow, a "system of transactors" showing aggregate sales and purchases, costs and incomes had to be devised, but just exactly how that system was put together, could differ a great deal, depending on "from whose point of view" the transactions were considered. The Physiocratic school, for example, believed that all wealth originated from the land, and their social accounting system was designed to show this clearly.

== Marx's definition ==
In Das Kapital and other writings, Marx divides the new "social product" of the working population (the flow of society's total output of new products in a defined time-interval) into the necessary product and the surplus product. Economically speaking, the "necessary" product refers to the output of products and services necessary to maintain a population of workers and their dependents at the prevailing standard of life (effectively, their total reproduction cost). The "surplus" product is whatever is produced in excess of those necessaries. Socially speaking, this division of the social product reflects the respective claims which the labouring class and the ruling class make on the new wealth created.

Strictly speaking, however, such an abstract, general distinction is a simplification, for at least three reasons.

- A society must usually also hold a fraction of the new social product in reserve at any time. These reserves (sometimes called "strategic stocks") by definition are not usually available for immediate distribution, but stored in some way, yet they are a necessary condition for longer-term survival. Such reserves must be maintained, even if no other excess to immediate requirements is produced, and therefore they can be considered a permanent reproduction cost, viewed over a longer interval of time, rather than as a true surplus.
- An additional complicating factor is population growth, since a growing population means that "more product" must be produced purely to ensure the survival of that population. In primitive societies, insufficient output just means that people will die, but in complex societies, continually "producing more" is physically necessary to sustain a growing population (this is admitted by Marx in Capital, Volume III, chapter 48 where he writes: "A definite quantity of surplus labour is required as insurance against accidents, and by the necessary and progressive expansion of the process of reproduction in keeping with the development of the needs and the growth of population, which is called accumulation from the viewpoint of the capitalist").
- At any time, a fraction of the adult working-age population does not work at all, yet these people must somehow be sustained as well. Insofar as they do not depend directly on the producers of the necessary product for their maintenance, they have to be sustained from communal or state resources, or by some other means.

The concept of a social surplus product seems very simple and straightforward at first sight, but for social scientists it is actually a quite complex concept. Many of the complexities are revealed when they try to measure the surplus product of a given economic community.

== Use ==
In producing, people must continually maintain their assets, replace assets, and consume things but they also can create more beyond those requirements, assuming sufficient productivity of labour.

This social surplus product can be:

- destroyed, or wasted
- held in reserve, or hoarded
- consumed
- traded or otherwise transferred to or from others
- reinvested

Thus, for a simple example, surplus seeds could be left to rot, stored, eaten, traded for other products, or sown on new fields. But if, for example, 90 people own 5 sacks of grain, and 10 people own 100 sacks of grain, it would be physically impossible for those 10 people to use all that grain themselves—most likely they would either trade that grain, or employ other people to farm it. Since 5 sacks of grain are insufficient for 90 people, it is likely that the 90 people would be willing to work for the 10 people who own more grain than they can consume, in order to get some extra grain.

=== Economic growth ===
If the surplus product is simply held in reserve, wasted or consumed, no economic growth (or enlarged economic reproduction) occurs. Only when the surplus is traded and/or reinvested does it become possible to increase the scale of production. For most of the history of urban civilisation, excess foodstuffs were the main basis of the surplus product, whether appropriated through trade, tribute, taxation, or some other method.

=== Surplus labour ===
In Marxism, the existence of a "surplus product" normally assumes the ability to perform surplus labour, i.e. extra labour beyond that which is necessary to maintain the direct producers and their family dependents at the existing standard of life. In Capital, Vol. 1, chapter 9, section 4, Marx actually defines the capitalist surplus product exclusively in terms of the relationship between the value of necessary labour and surplus labour; at any one time, this surplus product is lodged simultaneously in money, commodities (goods), and claims to labour-services, and therefore is not simply a "physical" surplus product (a stockpile of additional goods).

=== Economy of time ===
In Marx's view, as he expresses it in the Grundrisse all economising reduces to the economy of human labour-time. The greater human productivity is, the more time there is—potentially—to produce more than is necessary to simply reproduce the population. Alternatively, that extra time can be devoted to leisure, but who gets the leisure and who gets to do the extra work is usually strongly influenced by the prevailing power and moral relations, not just economics.

=== Human needs ===
The corollary of increasing wealth in society, with rising productivity, is that human needs and wants expand. Thus, as the surplus product increases, the necessary product per person also increases, which usually means an increase in the standard of living. In this context, Marx distinguishes between the physical minimum requirements for the maintenance of human life, and a moral-historical component of earnings from work.

This distinction is however somewhat deceptive, for several reasons.

- in more complex societies at least, minimum living costs involve social and infrastructural services, which also incur costs, and which are not optional from the point of view of survival.
- Which goods can be considered "luxuries" is not so easy to define. For example, owning a car may be considered a luxury, but if owning a car is indispensable for travelling to work and to shops, it is a necessity.
- Michael Hudson points out that in the modern United States, households spent only about a quarter of their income on directly purchasing consumer goods and consumer services. All the rest is spent on payments of interest, rents, taxes, loans, retirement provisions and insurance payments. Some of these financing payments could be considered "moral-historical" but some of them are a physical requirement since without them, people could die (for example, because they cannot get health care, or have no shelter).

== Marxian interpretation of the historical origin ==
For most of human prehistory, Marxian writers like Ernest Mandel and V. Gordon Childe argued, there existed no economic surplus product of any kind at all, except very small or incidental surpluses.

The main reasons were:

- that techniques were lacking to store, preserve, and package surpluses securely in large quantities or transport them reliably in large quantities over any significant distance;
- the productivity of labour was not sufficient to create much more than could be consumed by a small tribe;
- early tribal societies were mostly not oriented to producing more than they could actually use themselves, never mind maximising their production of output. Thus, for example, the anthropologist Marshall Sahlins estimated that the utilization by tribes of the "carrying capacity" of their habitat ranged from 7% among the Kuikuro of the Amazon basin to about 75% among the Lala of Zambia.
- different groups of people usually did not depend on trade for their survival, and the total amount of trading activity in society stayed proportionally small.

The formation of the first permanent surpluses are associated with tribal groups who are more or less settled in one territory, and stored foodstuffs. Once some reserves and surpluses exist, tribes can diversify their production, and members can specialise in producing tools, weapons, containers, and ornaments. Modern archaeological findings show that this development actually began in the more complex hunter-gatherer (foraging) societies. The formation of a reliable surplus product makes possible an initial technical or economic division of labour in which producers exchange their products. In addition, a secure surplus product makes possible population growth, i.e. less starvation, infanticide, or abandonment of the elderly or infirm. Finally, it creates the material basis for a social hierarchy, where those at the top of the hierarchy possess prestige goods which commoners do not have access to.

=== Neolithic Revolution ===
The first real "take off" in terms of surpluses, economic growth, and population growth probably occurred during what V. Gordon Childe called the Neolithic Revolution, i.e. the beginning of the widespread use of agriculture, from about 12,000 to 10,000 years ago onward, at which time the world population is estimated to have been somewhere between 1 and 10 million.

Archaeologist Geoffrey Dimbleby comments:

"It has been calculated that if man had never progressed beyond the hunting and food-gathering stage, the maximum population which the world's surface could support at any one time would be 20–30 million people."

=== Staple finance and wealth finance ===
As regards extraction of a surplus from the working population (whether as a tax, a tribute, a rent or some other method), modern anthropologists and archaeologists distinguish between "staple finance" and "wealth finance". They do not like the term "surplus product" anymore, because of its Marxist connotations and definitional controversies, but it boils down to the same thing.

- In the case of staple finance, the ordinary households supply staples (often foodstuffs, and sometimes standard items of craftwork) as a payment to the political centre or the property owner. This is a simple "payment in kind". The ruling elite owns the land, and receives shares of food produced by commoners in exchange for use rights. It is a simple system, though it creates logistical problems of physical storage and transport, as well as the needs to protect stores—from being raided, and from environmental hazards.
- In the case of wealth finance, the commoners do not supply staples, but rather valuables (wealth objects or prestige goods) or currencies which are more or less freely convertible in the exchange of goods. Usually currencies are found in state-organized societies; large states invariably use currency systems for taxation and payment. Valuables and currencies are much more portable, easily centralized, and they do not lose value through spoilage. The disadvantage is that they cannot be directly consumed; they have to be exchanged in markets for consumption goods. So, if markets are for some reason disrupted, wealth objects and currencies suddenly lose their value.

The system of surplus-extraction might also be a mix of staple finance and wealth finance. The use of the term "finance" for the appropriation of a surplus is just as troublesome as the term "surplus product". Commoners required to pay a levy, tax or tribute to the landowners, on pain of imprisonment or death, obviously are not making an "investment" for which they get a return, but instead are forced to pay the cost of using a piece of land they do not own.

The increasing economic division of labour is closely associated with the growth of trade and goes together with an increasing a social division of labour. As Ashley Montagu puts it, "barter, trade, and commerce largely depend on a society's exchangeable surpluses." One group in society utilizes its position in society (e.g. the management of reserves, military leadership, religious authority, etc.) to gain control over the social surplus product; as the people in this elite group assert their social power, everyone else is forced to leave the control over the surplus product to them. Although there is considerable controversy and speculation among archaeologists about how exactly these early rulers came to power (often because of a lack of written records), there is good evidence to suggest that the process does occur, particularly in tribal communities or clans which grow in size beyond 1,500 or so people.

From that point on, the surplus product is formed within a class relationship, in which the exploitation of surplus labour combines with active or passive resistance to that exploitation.

=== The state ===
To maintain social order and enforce a basic morality among a growing population, a centralized state apparatus emerges with soldiers and officials, as a distinct group in society which is subsidized from the surplus product, via taxes, tributes, rents and confiscations (including war booty). Because the ruling elite controls the production and distribution of the surplus product, it thereby also controls the state. In turn, this gives rise to a moral or religious ideology which justifies superior and inferior positions in the division of labour, and explains why some people are naturally entitled to appropriate more resources than others. Archaeologist Chris Scarre comments:

"There has been some debate as to whether states should be considered beneficent institutions, operating for the good of all, or whether they are essentially exploitative, with governing elites gaining wealth and power at the expense of the majority. For most documented examples, the latter seems closer to reality. In terms of scale, however, it is only with the benefit of centralized state control that large populations can be integrated and supported; the collapse of states... is inevitably followed by population decline."

Archaeologist Bruce G. Trigger comments:

"It appears that, regardless of the agricultural regime followed, between 70 and 90 percent of the labour input in early civilizations was, of necessity, devoted to food production. This means that all early civilizations had to remain predominantly agricultural. It also means that the surplus resources available to the upper classes were never large in relation to total production and had to be used carefully. Because of this, strategies for increasing revenue had to be mainly political: increasing the number of farmers controlled, creating situations in which ruling groups shared available resources more disproportionately according to rank, or persuading farmers to surrender marginally greater amounts of surplus production without increasing the cost of the mechanisms needed to ensure social control."

Given the rather low labour-productivity of agrarian societies, a proportionally large amount of (surplus-)labour was needed in the ancient world to produce a relatively small amount of physical surplus.

Archaeologist Brian M. Fagan comments:

"The combination of economic productivity, control over sources and distribution of food and wealth, the development and maintenance of the stratified social system and its ideology, and the ability to maintain control by force was the vital ingredient of early states".

According to Gil Stein, the earliest known state organizations emerged in Mesopotamia (3700 BC), Egypt (3300 BC), the Indus Valley (2500 BC) and China (1400 BC). In various parts of the world, e.g. Africa and Australasia, tribal societies and chiefdoms persisted for much longer before state formation occurred. Many modern states originated out of colonialism. For example, the British empire at its largest contained a quarter of the world population. Many of the colonized countries originally did not have a state apparatus, only chiefdoms.

== Socio-economic inequality between people ==
The size of the surplus product, based on a certain level of productivity, has implications for how it can possibly be shared out. Quite simply, if there is not enough to go around, it cannot be shared equally. If 10 products are produced, and there are 100 people, it is fairly obvious they cannot all consume or use them; most likely, some will get the products, and others must do without. This is according to Marx and Engels the ultimate reason for socioeconomic inequality, and why, for thousands of years, all attempts at an egalitarian society failed. Thus they wrote:

"All conquests of freedom hitherto ... have been based on restricted productive forces. The production which these productive forces could provide was insufficient for the whole of society and made development possible only if some persons satisfied their needs at the expense of others, and therefore some—the minority—obtained the monopoly of development, while others—the majority—owing to the constant struggle to satisfy their most essential needs, were for the time being (i.e. until the birth of new revolutionary productive forces) excluded from any development. Thus, society has hitherto always developed within the framework of a contradiction—in antiquity the contradiction between free men and slaves, in the Middle Ages that between nobility and serfs, in modern times that between the bourgeoisie and the proletariat."

But it would be erroneous to simply infer the pattern of socioeconomic inequality from the size of the surplus product. That would be like saying, "People are poor because they are poor". At each stage of the development of human society, there have always been different possibilities for a more equitable distribution of wealth. Which of those possibilities have been realised is not just a question of technique or productivity, but also of the assertion of power, ideology, and morals within the prevailing system of social relations governing legitimate cooperation and competition. The wealth of some may depend on the poverty of others.

Some scarcity is truly physical scarcity; other scarcity is purely socially constructed, i.e. people are excluded from wealth not by physical scarcity but through the way the social system functions (the system of property rights and distributing wealth that it has). In modern times, calculations have been done of the type that an annual levy of 5.2% on the fortunes of the world's 500 or so billionaires would be financially sufficient to guarantee essential needs for the whole world population. In money terms, the world's 1,100 richest people have almost twice the assets of the poorest 2.5 billion people representing 40% of the world population. In his famous book Capital in the Twenty-First Century, Thomas Piketty suggests that if present trends continue, there will be an even more gigantic concentration of wealth in the future.

In that case, there is no real physical scarcity with regard to the goods satisfying basic human needs anymore. It's more a question of political will and social organisation to improve the lot of the poor, or, alternatively, for the poor to organise themselves to improve their lot.

== In capitalist society ==
The category of surplus product is a transhistorical economic category, meaning it applies to any society with a stable division of labour, and a significant labour productivity, regardless of how exactly that surplus product is produced, what it consists of, and how it is distributed. That depends on the social relations and relations of production specific to a society, within the framework of which surplus labour is performed. Thus, the exact forms taken by the surplus product are specific to the type of society which creates it.

=== Historical dynamics ===
If we plotted economic growth or population growth rates on a graph from, for example, the year zero, we would obtain a tangent curve, with the sharp bend occurring in the 19th century. Within the space of 100 years, a gigantic increase in productivity occurred with new forms of technology and labor-cooperation. This was, according to Marx, the "revolutionary" aspect of the capitalist mode of production, and it meant a very large increase in the surplus product created by human labour. Marx believed it could be the material basis for a transition to communism in the future, a form of human society in which all could live to their potential, because there was enough to satisfy all human needs for everybody.

Economic historian Paul Bairoch comments:

"...in traditional societies the average agricultural worker produced an amount of foodstuff only about 20 to 30% in excess of his family's consumption. ... These percentages—this 20 to 30% surplus—acquire special meaning if we take into account a factor often omitted from theories of economic development, namely, the yearly fluctuations of agricultural yields, which even at a national level could amount to an average of over 25%. Consequently, periodical subsistence crises became inevitable, crises greater or less in degree but which at their worst could produce a decline in economic life and hence in the civilisation it supported. For this reason, as long as agricultural productivity had not progressed beyond that stage, it was practically impossible to conceive of a continuous progress in the development of civilisations, let alone of the accelerated scientific and technical progress that is an essential characteristic of modern times. The profound changes in the system of agricultural production that preceded the industrial revolution brought that particular deadlock to an end. The consequent increase in productivity led in the space of 40 to 60 years to the transition from an average surplus of the order of 25% to something more like 50% and over, thus surpassing—for the first time in the history of mankind—what might be called the risk-of-famine limit; in other words, a really bad harvest no longer meant, as in the past, serious shortage or actual famine. The agricultural revolution... prepared the way for the industrial revolution."

Economic historian Roberto Sabatino Lopez adds that:

"Though most farmers and peasants individually produced very little surplus, the aggregated surplus of millions of agricultural workers was easily enough to support a large number of towns and to foster the development of industry, commerce and banking. Much as they admired agriculture and depended on it, the Romans literally identified "civilization" with cities (civitates)."

=== From surplus product to surplus value ===
Specific to the surplus product within capitalist society, as Marx discusses in Das Kapital, are these main aspects (among others):

- The surplus product itself no longer consists simply of "physical" surpluses or tangible use-values, but increasingly of tradeable commodities or assets convertible into money. Claims to the social product are realised primarily through purchase with money, and the social product itself can be valued in money prices. The economising and division of the necessary and surplus product between different uses, and between different social classes, is increasingly also expressed in quantities of money units. The emphasis is on maximising wealth as such, based on calculations in terms of abstract price relations.
- There is an increasingly strong connection between the surplus product and surplus value, so that, as the capitalist mode of production expands and displaces other ways of producing, surplus-value and the surplus-product become to a large extent identical. In a purely capitalist society they would be completely identical (but such a society is unlikely ever to exist, other than in economic models and analogies).
- The ability to claim the surplus value created in production through the production of new output, in the form of profit income, becomes very dependent on market sales and buying power. If goods and services fail to sell, because people have no money, the business owner is left with surpluses which are useless to him, and which very likely deteriorate in value. This creates a constant need to maintain and expand market demand, and a growing world market for products and services.
- Competition between many different private enterprises exerts a strong compulsion to accumulate (invest) a large part of the surplus product to maintain and improve market position, rather than consume it. Failure to do so would drive business owners out of business. For Marx, this was the main cause behind the gigantic increase in economic growth during the 19th century.
- The corollary of the enormous increase in physical productivity (output of goods) is that a larger and larger component of the social product, valued in money prices, consists of the production and consumption of services. This leads to a redefinition of wealth: not just a stock of assets, but also the ability to consume services enhancing the quality of life (note: many activities called "services" supply tangible products).
- The dialectic of scarcity and surplus gradually begins to invert itself: the problem of optimal allocation of scarce resources begins to give away to the problem of the optimal allocation of abundant resources. High productivity leads to excess capacity: more resources can be produced than can be consumed, mainly because buying power is lacking among the masses. This can lead to dumping practices. At the same time, the ownership of wealth becomes strongly concentrated, shutting out huge masses of people from owning any significant assets.
- The bourgeoisie as a ruling class is historically rather unusual, because it emerges and exists separately from the state, rather than being the state (like many earlier ruling classes). The different and competing fractions of the bourgeoisie mandate others (usually professional middle-class people, such as lawyers and economists) to govern for them as a "political class" or polity; the bourgeoisie itself is mainly preoccupied with doing business. Ordinarily, the business class gets rich from business, and not from imposing taxes and tributes themselves (that would often be regarded as a criminal protection racket, not valid trade). The bourgeois state typically lacks ownership of an independent economic base sufficient to self-finance its own activities; it perpetually depends on levying taxes with consent of the population, and on loans from the bourgeoisie. With the bourgeois state, taxpayers have the possibility of electing their own representatives to state office, which means that they can in principle influence the taxation system and the justice system generally. That possibility has rarely existed in non-capitalist states; there, any criticism of the state means that the critic is fined, imprisoned or killed.

Marx believed that, by splitting purely economic-commercial considerations off from legal-moral, political or religious considerations, capitalist society for the first time in history made it possible to express the economic functions applying to all types of society in their purest forms. In pre-capitalist society, "the economy" did not exist as a separate abstraction or reality, any more than long-term mass unemployment existed (other than in exceptional cases, such as wars or natural disasters). It is only when the "cash nexus" mediates most resource allocation, that "the economy" becomes viewed as a separate domain (the domain of commercial activity), quantifiable by means of money-prices.

=== Socialist economy ===
A socialist society, Marxian economists argue, also has a surplus product from an economic point of view, insofar as more is produced than is consumed. Nevertheless, the creation and distribution of the surplus product would begin to operate under different rules. In particular, how the new wealth is allocated would be decided much more according to popular-democratic and egalitarian principles, using a variety of property forms and allocative methods that have proved practically to correspond best to meeting the human needs of all. 20th century experience with economic management shows that there is a broad scala of possibilities here; if some options are chosen, and others not, this has more to do with who holds political power than anything else.

== Measurement ==
The magnitude of the surplus product can be estimated in stocks of physical use-values, in money prices, or in labour hours.

If it is known:

- what and how much was produced in a year,
- what the population structure is,
- what incomes or earnings were received,
- how many hours were worked in different occupations,
- what the normal actual consumption pattern is,
- what the producers pay in terms of taxes or tribute

then measures of the necessary product and surplus product can in principle be estimated.

However it is never possible to obtain mathematically exact or fully objective distinctions between necessary and surplus product, because social needs and investment requirements are always subject to moral debate and political contests between social classes. At best, some statistical indicators can be developed. In Das Kapital, Marx himself was less concerned with measurement issues than with the social relations involved in the production and distribution of the surplus product.

Essentially the techniques for estimating the size of the surplus product in a capitalist economy are similar to those for measuring surplus-value. However, some components of the surplus product may not be marketed products or services. The existence of markets always presupposes a lot of non-market labour as well. A physical surplus product is not the same as surplus value, and the magnitudes of surplus product, surplus labour and surplus value may diverge.

== Social valuation of labour ==
Although it is nowadays possible to measure the number of hours worked in a country with reasonable accuracy, there have been few attempts by social statisticians to estimate the surplus product in terms of labour hours.

Very interesting information has become available from time use surveys however on how people in society on average spend their time. From this data, it is evident just how much modern market economies in reality depend on the performance of unpaid (i.e. volunteered) labour. That is, the forms of labour that are the subject of commercial exploitation are quantitatively only a sub-set of the total labour which is done in a society, and depend on non-market labour being performed.

This in turn creates a specific and characteristic way in which different labour activities are valued and prioritised. Some forms of labour can command a high price, others have no price at all, or are priceless. Nevertheless, all labor in capitalist society is influenced by value relations, irrespective of whether a price happens to be imputed to it or not. The commercial valuation of labor may not necessarily say anything though about the social or human valuation of labor.

== Decadence ==
Marxian theory suggests decadence involves a clear waste of a large part of the surplus product from any balanced or nuanced human point of view, and it typically goes together with a growing indifference to the wellbeing and fate of other human beings; to survive, people are forced to shut out from their consciousness those horrors which are seemingly beyond their ability to do anything about anymore. Marx & Engels suggest in The German Ideology that in this case the productive forces are transformed into destructive forces.

According to Marxian theory, decaying or decadent societies are defined mainly by the fact that:

- The gap between what is produced and what could potentially (or technically) be produced (sometimes called the "GDP gap" or "output gap") grows sharply.
- A very large proportion of the surplus product is squandered, or devoted to luxury consumption, speculative activity, or military expenditures.
- All sorts of activities and products appear which are really useless or even harmful from the point of view of improving human life, to the detriment of activities which are more healthy for human life as a whole.
- Enormous wealth and gruesome poverty and squalor exist side by side, suggesting that society has lost its sense of moral and economic priorities. The ruling elite no longer cares for the welfare of the population it rules, and may be divided within itself.
- A consensual morality and sense of trust has broken down, criminality increases, and the ruling elite has lost its legitimacy in the eyes of the people, so that it can maintain power only by the crudest of methods (violence, propaganda, and intimidation whereby people are cowed into submission).
- A regression occurs to the ideas, values, and practices of an earlier period of human history, which may involve the treatment of other people as less than human.
- The society "fouls its own nest" in the sense of undermining the very conditions of its own reproduction.

Marxian scholars such as Ernest Mandel argued this condition typically involves a stalemate in the balance of power between social classes, none of which is really able to assert its dominance, and thus able to implement a constructive programme of action that would ensure real social progress and benefit the whole population. According to Herbert Marcuse, a society is "sick" if its basic institutions and relationships are such that they make it impossible to use resources for the optimal development of human existence.

However, there is a lot of controversy among historians and politicians about the existence and nature of decadence, because value judgements and biases about the meaning of human progress are usually involved. In different periods of history, people have defined decadence in very different ways. For example, hedonism is not necessarily decadent; it is decadent only within a certain context. Thus, accusations of decadence may be made which only reflect a certain moral feeling of social classes, not a true objective reality.

== Criticisms ==
=== Three basic criticisms ===
- At the simplest level, it is argued that in trade, one man's gain is another man's loss; so if we subtracted total losses from total gains, the result would be zero. So how, then, can there be any surplus, other than goods which fail to be traded? It is not difficult to show that the gains and losses may not balance out, leading to economic crises, but many arguments have been given to show that there are only "coincidental" or "temporary" surpluses of some kind. Yet, peculiarly, even on a crude estimate of value added, the gross output value of production equals more than the value of labour and materials costs. If a surplus does not exist, it becomes difficult to explain how economic growth (the growth of output) can occur, and why there was more to distribute than there had been (see surplus-value). Somehow, more comes out of production than went into it. The answer is that much of surplus comes out of human labor, which is a 'renewable resource'; the first form of surplus in many societies, excess food, comes from innovations in agriculture that allow farmers to produce more than they will consume.
- The denial that a surplus product exists, therefore tends to focus more on the exact definition of it, i.e. "surplus" in relation to what exactly? For example, is undistributed profit really a "surplus", or is it a cost of production? Some ecologists also argue that we should produce no more than we really need, in an ecologically responsible way. This raises the question of how we can objectively know whether something is really "surplus" or not—at best we can say that something is surplus relative to a given set of verifiable human needs, conditions, uses or requirements. In this sense, Siegfried Haas argues for example that surplus is the quantity of natural and produced goods that remains in a society after a year (or other defined time period) when basic biological needs are met and social or religious obligations are fulfilled. Anthropologist Estellie Smith defines the surplus as "the retained resources of production minus consumption" or as ""material and non-material resources in excess of what is culturally defined as the current optimum supply".
- Another type of criticism is that the very notion of surplus product is purely relative and circumstantial, or even subjective, because any person can regard something as a 'surplus' if he has command or effective control over it, and is in a position where he can use it in whatever manner he thinks appropriate—even although others would not regard it as "surplus" at all. In this sense, it might appear as though the concept of "surplus product" is primarily a moral concept referring to a propensity of human beings "to reap where they did not sow", whether criminally/immorally, with a legally tolerated justification, or by asserting brute power.

=== Four advanced criticisms ===
- A different sort of problem is, that the broad division of the annual new social product in net terms, into consumer items and investment items, does not directly map onto the value of costs and revenues generated in producing it. From the social point of view, accounting for what is a "cost" and what represents an "income" is always somewhat controversial, since the costs incurred by some correspond to the income receipts of others. The exact procedures adopted for "grossing and netting" flows of income, expenditures and products always reflect a theory or interpretation of the social character of the economy. Thus, the categories used may not accurately reflect the real relationships involved.
- The Cambridge economist Piero Sraffa returned to the classical economic meaning of "surplus", but his concept differs from Marx's in at least three important ways: (1) The substance of Sraffa's surplus is not a claim on the surplus labour of others but a physical surplus, i.e. the value of physical output less the value of physical inputs used up to produce it, in abstraction from price changes (roughly, like a "standard valuation" in national accounts); (2) The magnitude of the surplus in Sraffa's model is exclusively technologically determined by the physical replacement requirements of the economy—and not by power or class relationships—so that the more efficient the economy becomes, the more surplus is created; (3) The form of Sraffa's surplus includes both the gross profit component and the value of goods and services consumed by workers, so that the distribution of the physical surplus between capitalists and workers occurs after a fixed quantity of surplus has already been produced. In a joint work, Paul Baran and Paul Sweezy follow Sraffa and define the economic surplus as "the difference between what a society produces and the costs of producing it". Marxists have often replied that this view of the matter just stays at the level of double-entry bookkeeping (where the uses of funds balance against the sources of funds), among other things because it makes the surplus simply equal to net value-added in double-entry accounting terms. The "accounting point of view" itself is never questioned because, in an effort to make concepts "scientifically more exact", accounting methods are inevitably used.
- The existence of a surplus product usually involves power relations among people, who assert what is surplus and what is not, in a perpetual contest over how the social product of their labor ought to be divided up and distributed. In this context, Randall H. McGuire, a Marxist archaeologist, emphasizes that:

In V. Gordon Childe's scheme the social surplus exists first, and then the ruling class arises to exploit this surplus. This view assumes that there exists a set quantity of stuff that is needed for social reproduction, and that once primary producers make more than this amount, they have produced a social surplus. There does not, however, exist a set amount of stuff that is necessary for social or biological reproduction. The amount and quality of calories, protein, clothing, shelter, education, and other things needed to reproduce the primary producers can vary enormously from time to time and place to place. The division between necessary and surplus labour reflects an underlying relationship, class, when one group, an elite class, has the power to take labor or the products of labor from another, the primary producers. This relationship defines social surplus".

Anthropologist Robert L. Carneiro also comments:

The principal difficulty with [Gordon Childe's] theory is that agriculture does not automatically create a food surplus. We know this because many agricultural peoples of the world produce no such surplus. Virtually all Amazonian Indians, for example, were agricultural, but in aboriginal times they did not produce a food surplus. That it was technically feasible for them to produce such a surplus is shown by the fact that, under the stimulus of European settlers' desire for food, a number of tribes did raise manioc in amounts well above their own needs, for the purpose of trading. Thus the technical means for generating a food surplus were there; it was the social mechanisms needed to actualize it that were lacking.

Several authors have therefore argued that "it is not the surplus which generates stratification, but stratification which generates surplus by activating an unrealized potential for surplus in the productive system".

- It is argued by several anthropologists, archaeologists and historians that we should not automatically assume that the producer of a surplus "does not need" (has no use for) what he exchanges or hands over as a tribute to a lord, employer or state functionary. Goods may be extracted from the direct producers which are not at all "surplus" to their own requirements, but which are appropriated by the rulers "at the expense" of the lifestyle of the direct producers in a "zero-sum game". It all depends on the intensity of exploitation. So, for example, a law might stipulate that peasants must pay a fixed quantity of their products as a tax, regardless of whether the harvest has been good or bad. If the harvest was bad, the peasants might be left with insufficient products for their own needs.

=== Karl Marx versus Adam Smith ===
Adam Smith found the origin of the division of labour in the "natural" human propensity to truck, barter and exchange. He stated that "the certainty of being able to exchange all that surplus part of the produce of his own labour, which is over and above his own consumption, for such parts of the produce of other men's labour as he may have occasion for, encourages every man to apply himself to a particular occupation, and to cultivate and bring to perfection whatever talent or genius he may possess for that particular species of business".

In Marx's view, commercial trade powerfully stimulated the growth of a surplus product, not because the surplus product is itself generated by trade, or because trade itself creates wealth (wealth has to be produced before it can be distributed or transferred through trade), but rather because the final purpose of such trade is capital accumulation, i.e. because the aim of commercial trade is to grow richer out of it, to accumulate wealth. If traders did not get an income out of trading (because their sales revenue exceeds their costs) they would not engage in it. Income growth can, ultimately, only occur if the total stock of assets available for distribution itself grows, as a result of more being produced than existed before. The more surplus there is, the more there is that can be appropriated and traded in order to make money out of it. If people just consume what they produce themselves, other people cannot get rich from that.

Thus, because the accumulation of capital normally stimulates the growth of the productive forces, this has the effect that the size of the surplus product which can be traded will normally grow also. The more the trading network then expands, the more complex and specialized the division of labour will become, and the more products people will produce which are surplus to their own requirements. Gradually, the old system of subsistence production is completely destroyed and replaced with commercial production, which means that people must then necessarily trade in order to meet their needs ("market civilization"). Their labour becomes social labour, i.e. co-operative labour which produces products for others—products which they don't consume themselves.

It is, of course, also possible to amass wealth simply by taking it off other people in some way, but once this appropriation has occurred, the source of additional wealth vanishes, and the original owners are no longer so motivated to produce surpluses, simply because they know their products will be taken off them (they no longer reap the rewards of their own production, in which case the only way to extract more wealth from them is by forcing them to produce more). It's like killing the goose that lays the golden egg.

In The Wealth of Nations Adam Smith had already recognized the central importance of the division of labour for economic growth, on the ground that it increased productivity ("industriousness" or "efficiency"), but, Marx suggests, Smith failed to theorize clearly why the division of labour stimulated economic growth.

- From the fact that an efficient division of labour existed between producers, no particular method of distributing different products among producers necessarily followed. In principle, given a division of labour, products could be distributed in all kinds of ways—market trade being only one way—and how it was done just depended on how claims to property happened to be organised and enforced using the available technologies. Economic growth wasn't a logically necessary effect of the division of labour, because it all depended on what was done with the new wealth being shared out by the producers, and how it was shared out. All kinds of distributive norms could be applied, with different effects on wealth creation.
- Smith confused the technical division of work tasks between co-operatively organized producers, to make production more efficient, with the system of property rights defining the social division of labour between different social classes, where one class could claim the surplus product from the surplus labour of another class because it owned or controlled the means of production. In other words, the essential point was that the social division of labour powerfully promoted the production of surpluses which could be alienated from the producers and appropriated, and those who had control over this division of labour in fact promoted specific ways of organizing production and trade precisely for this purpose—and not necessarily at all to make production "more efficient".
- Smith's theoretical omissions paved the way for the illusion that market trade itself generates economic growth, the effect of that being that the real relationship between the production and distribution of wealth became a mystery. According to Marx, this effect in economic theory was not accidental; it served an ideological justifying purpose, namely to reinforce the idea that only market expansion can be beneficial for economic growth. In fact, the argument becomes rather tautological, i.e. market expansion is thought to be "what you mean" by economic growth. The logical corollary of such an idea was, that all production should ideally be organized as market-oriented production, so that all are motivated to produce more for the purpose of gaining wealth. The real aim behind the justification however was the private accumulation of capital by the owners of property, which depended on the social production of a surplus product by others who lacked sufficient assets to live on. In other words, the justification reflected that market expansion was normally the main legally sanctioned means in capitalist society by which more wealth produced by others could be appropriated by the owners of capital, and that for this purpose any other form of producing and distributing products should be rejected. Economic development then became a question of how private property rights could be established everywhere, so that markets could expand (see also primitive accumulation). This view of the matter, according to Marx, explained precisely why the concept of the social surplus product had vanished from official economic theory in the mid-19th century—after all, this concept raised the difficult political and juridical question of what entitles some to appropriate the labour and products of others. Markets were henceforth justified with the simple idea that even if some might gain more than others from market trade, all stood to gain from it; and if they didn't gain something, they would not trade. Marx's reply to that was essentially that most people were in a position where they necessarily had to trade, because if they didn't, they would perish—without having much control over the terms of trade. In that respect, the owners of capital were in a vastly stronger position than workers who owned only some personal belongings (and perhaps some small savings).

== See also ==
- Critique of political economy
- Value-form
- Operating surplus
- Productive and unproductive labour
- Rate of exploitation
