= Anton Menger =

Anton Menger von Wolfensgrün
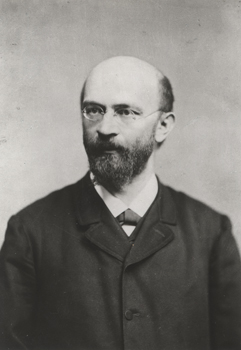
- Anton Menger, circa 1890, photographed by Josef Löwy
- Born: 12 September 1841; Maniowy - now under the Czorsztyn Lake, Galicia, Austrian Empire
- Died: 6 February 1906 (aged 64); Rome

Philosophical work
- Main interests: Legal Philosophy

Anton Menger von Wolfensgrün (12 September 1841, Maniowy - now under the Czorsztyn Lake, Galicia – 6 February 1906, Rome), was an Austrian juridical expert and social theorist who aside from his collegiate works predominantly dedicated himself to propagating socialist literature on juridical grounds. He is the author of "The Right to the Whole Produce of Labor", "The Civil Law and the Poor" among others. He was the brother of Austrian economist Carl Menger.

== Life and works ==
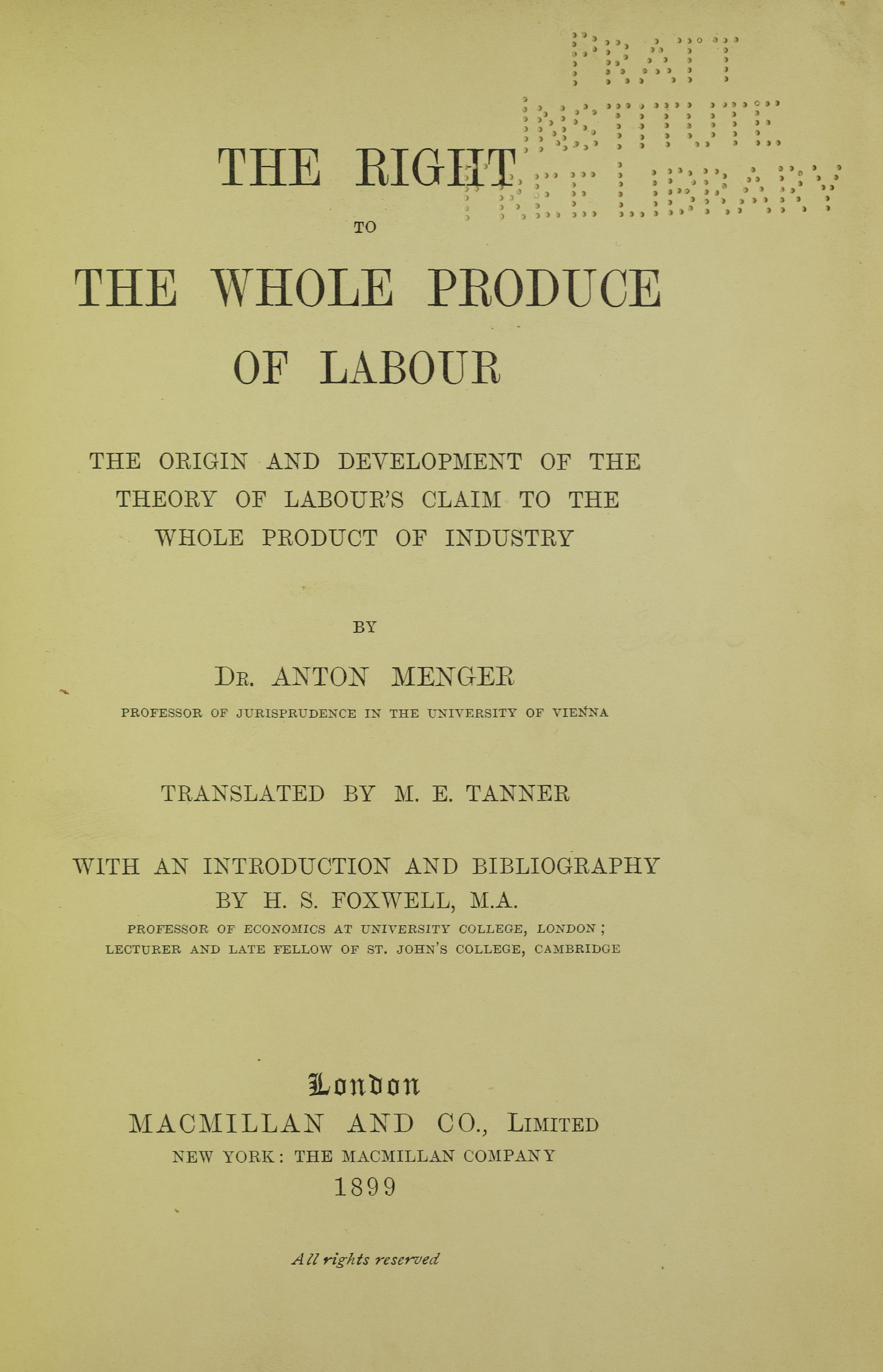
Recht auf den vollen Arbeitsertrag in geschichtlicher Darstellung, 1899

Menger was a university professor for the law of civil process in Vienna from 1874 until 1899, where he was also the Vice Chancellor from 1895 to 1896. Carl Menger was his brother.

Menger's theses and arguments stem from a changed social structure, that was shaped by the economic crisis (1873) and social questions that sought answers from liberal politics ("invisible hand" Adam Smith) in the pursuit of social justice. His juridical interests are assumed to be different than Karl Marx and Friedrich Engels in dealing with all theoretical legal issues.

In Menger's juridical theory, he dismissed the basis of positive law from natural law. Rather, he argued that the backbone of law was merely a gauge of societal power relations.

His name is also famous in connection with the collection of original socialist literature in Vienna. Menger collected everything that he could procure and began a book tour through Paris, London and Berlin, where his special socialist collection was unique in the world for the time. Mengers private library was acquired by the Sozialwissenschaftlichen Studienbibliothek der Kammer für Arbeiter und Angestellte für Wien in the 1920s.

Friedrich Engels and Karl Kautsky tried to grapple with Menger's (1886) attacks on Marx's Das Kapital as well as his fundamental project to ground socialism in legal theory in "Juridical Socialism" ("Die Neue Zeit", 2, Jg. 1887; abgedr. MEW 21, 491 ff.): "The evidence shows that Marx was a plagiarist, and this is proof that the concept of surplus value was already brought about in another sense before Marx!"

The Mengergasse in Floridsdorf (21. Bezirk) was named after him in 1919.

== Publications ==
- Die Zulässigkeit neuen thatsächlichen Vorbringens in den höheren Instanzen. Eine civilprocessualische Abhandlung. 1873.
- Das Recht auf den vollen Arbeitsertrag in geschichtlicher Darstellung. Cotta, Stuttgart 1886.
- Gutachten über die Vorschläge zur Errichtung einer eidgenössischen Hochschule für Rechts- und Staatswissenschaft. Zürich, J. J. Schabelitz. 1889
- Das Bürgerliche Recht und die besitzlosen Volksklassen. Eine Kritik des Entwurfs eines Bürgerlichen Gesetzbuches für das Deutsche Reich. 1890.
- Die sozialen Aufgaben der Rechtswissenschaft. ( Antrittsrede bei Übernahme des Rektorates der Universität Wien ). 1896 ( 2. Auflage Wien, Braumüller 1905 )
- Neue Staatslehre. 1903.
- Neue Sittenlehre. Jena, G. Fischer, 1905.

== Literature ==
- H. Hörner: "Menger (von Wolfensgrün) Anton". In: Österreichisches Biographisches Lexikon 1815–1950 (ÖBL). Vol. 6, Austrian Academy of Sciences, Vienna 1975, ISBN 3-7001-0128-7, p. 220 f. (Direct links to "p. 220", "p. 221")
- Gerhard Oberkofler: Anton Menger (1841-1906). In: Bewahren Verbreiten Aufklären. Hrsg. Günter Benser und Michael Schneider. Bonn-Bad Godesberg 2009 ISBN 978-3-86872-105-8, S. 196-201 online (pdf)
