= Surplus labour =

Economic concept

Surplus labour (German: Mehrarbeit) is a concept used by Karl Marx in his critique of political economy. It means labour performed in excess of the labour necessary to produce the means of livelihood of the worker ("necessary labour"). The "surplus" in this context means the additional labour a worker has to do in their job, beyond earning their own keep. According to Marxian economics, surplus labour is usually uncompensated (unpaid) labor. Marx's first analysis of what surplus labour means appeared in The Poverty of Philosophy (1847), a polemic against the philosophy of Pierre-Joseph Proudhon. A much more detailed analysis is presented in the volumes of Theories of Surplus Value and Das Kapital.

== Origin ==
Marx explains the origin of surplus labour in the following terms:

"It is only after men have raised themselves above the rank of animals, when therefore their labour has been to some extent socialised, that a state of things arises in which the surplus-labour of the one becomes a condition of existence for the other. At the dawn of civilisation the productivity acquired by labour is small, but so too are the wants which develop with and by the means of satisfying them. Further, at that early period, the portion of society that lives on the labour of others is infinitely small compared with the mass of direct producers. Along with the progress in the productiveness of labour, that small portion of society increases both absolutely and relatively. Besides, capital with its accompanying relations springs up from an economic soil that is the product of a long process of development. The productiveness of labour that serves as its foundation and starting-point, is a gift, not of nature, but of a history embracing thousands of centuries."

The historical emergence of surplus labour is, according to Marx, also closely associated with the growth of trade (the economic exchange of goods and services) and with the emergence of a society divided into social classes. As soon as a permanent surplus product can be produced, the moral-political question arises as to how it should be distributed, and for whose benefit surplus-labour should be performed. The strong defeat the weak, and it becomes possible for a social elite and its army to gain control over the surplus-labour and surplus product of the working population; they can live off the labour of others.

Labour which is sufficiently productive so that it can perform surplus labour is, in a cash economy, the material foundation for the appropriation of surplus-value from that labour. How exactly this appropriation will occur, is determined by the prevailing relations of production and the balance of power between social classes.

According to Marx, capital had its origin in the commercial activity of buying in order to sell, charging interest on loans, and rents of various types, with the aim of gaining an income (a surplus value) from this trade. But, initially, this does not involve any capitalist mode of production; rather, merchant traders, state functionaries, religious authorities, money-dealers and rentiers are intermediaries between non-capitalist producers. During a lengthy historical process, the old ways of extracting surplus labour through direct coercion are gradually replaced by commercial forms of exploitation and private industrial enterprises.

== Historical materialism ==
In Das Kapital Vol. 3, Marx highlights the central role played by surplus labor:

"The specific economic form, in which unpaid surplus-labour is pumped out of direct producers, determines the relationship of rulers and ruled, as it grows directly out of production itself and, in turn, reacts upon it as a determining element. Upon this, however, is founded the entire formation of the economic community which grows up out of the production relations themselves, thereby simultaneously its specific political form. It is always the direct relationship of the owners of the conditions of production to the direct producers — a relation always naturally corresponding to a definite stage in the development of the methods of labour and thereby its social productivity — which reveals the innermost secret, the hidden basis of the entire social structure and with it the political form of the relation of sovereignty and dependence, in short, the corresponding specific form of the state. This does not prevent the same economic basis — the same from the standpoint of its main conditions — due to innumerable different empirical circumstances, natural environment, racial relations, external historical influences, etc. from showing infinite variations and gradations in appearance, which can be ascertained only by analysis of the empirically given circumstances."

This statement is a foundation of Marx's historical materialism insofar as it specifies what the class conflicts in civil society are ultimately about: an economy of time, which compels some to do work of which part or all of the benefits go to someone else, while others can have leisure-time which in reality depends on the work efforts of those forced to work.

In modern society, having work or leisure may often seem a choice, but for most of humanity, work is an absolute necessity, and consequently most people are concerned with the real benefits they get from that work. They may accept a certain rate of exploitation of their labour as an inescapable condition for their existence, if they depend on a wage or salary, but beyond that, they will increasingly resist it. Consequently, a morality or legal norm develops in civil society which imposes limits for surplus-labour, in one form or another. Forced labour, slavery, gross mistreatment of workers etc. are no longer generally acceptable, although they continue to occur; working conditions and pay levels can usually be contested in courts of law.

== Unequal exchange ==
Marx acknowledged that surplus labour may not just be appropriated directly in production by the owners of the enterprise, but also in trade. This phenomenon is nowadays called unequal exchange. Thus, he commented that:

"From the possibility that profit may be less than surplus value, hence that capital [may] exchange profitably without realising itself in the strict sense, it follows that not only individual capitalists, but also nations may continually exchange with one another, may even continually repeat the exchange on an ever-expanding scale, without for that reason necessarily gaining in equal degrees. One of the nations may continually appropriate for itself a part of the surplus labour of the other, giving back nothing for it in the exchange, except that the measure here [is] not as in the exchange between capitalist and worker."

In this case, more work effectively exchanges for less work, and a greater value exchanges for a lesser value, because some possess a stronger market position, and others a weaker one. For the most part, Marx assumed equal exchange in Das Kapital, i.e. that supply and demand would balance; his argument was that even if, ideally speaking, no unequal exchange occurred in trade, and market equality existed, exploitation could nevertheless occur within capitalist relations of production, since the value of the product produced by labour power exceeded the value of labour power itself. Marx never completed his analysis of the world market however.

In the real world, Marxian economists like Samir Amin argue, unequal exchange occurs all the time, implying transfers of value from one place to another, through the trading process. Thus, the more trade becomes "globalised", the greater the intermediation between producers and consumers; consequently, the intermediaries appropriate a growing fraction of the final value of the products, while the direct producers obtain only a small fraction of that final value.

The most important unequal exchange in the world economy nowadays concerns the exchange between agricultural goods and industrial goods, i.e. the terms of trade favour industrial goods against agricultural goods. Often, as Raul Prebisch already noted, this has meant that more and more agricultural output must be produced and sold, to buy a given amount of industrial goods. This issue has become the subject of heated controversy at recent WTO meetings.

The practice of unequal or unfair exchange does not presuppose the capitalist mode of production, nor even the existence of money. It only presupposes that goods and services of unequal value are traded, something which has been possible throughout the whole history of human trading practices.

== Criticism of Marx's concept of surplus labour ==
According to economist Fred Moseley, "neoclassical economic theory was developed, in part, to attack the very notion of surplus labor or surplus value and to argue that workers receive all of the value embodied in their creative efforts."

Some basic modern criticisms of Marx's theory can be found in the works by Pearson, Dalton, Boss, Hodgson and Harris (see references).

The analytical Marxist John Roemer challenges what he calls the "fundamental Marxian theorem" (after Michio Morishima) that the existence of surplus labour is the necessary and sufficient condition for profits. He proves that this theorem is logically false. However, Marx himself never argued that surplus labour was a sufficient condition for profits, only an ultimate necessary condition (Morishima aimed to prove that, starting from the existence of profit expressed in price terms, we can deduce the existence of surplus value as a logical consequence). Five reasons were that:

- profit in a capitalist operation was "ultimately" just a financial claim to products and labour services made by those who did not themselves produce those products and services, in virtue of their ownership of private property (capital assets).
- profits could be made purely in trading processes, which themselves could be far removed in space and time from the co-operative labour which those profits ultimately presupposed.
- surplus labour could be performed, without this leading to any profits at all, because e.g. the products of that labour failed to be sold.
- profits could be made without any labour being involved, such as when a piece of unimproved land is sold for a profit.
- profits could be made by a self-employed operator who did not perform surplus labour for somebody else, nor necessarily appropriated surplus labour from anywhere else.

All that Marx really argued was that surplus labor was a necessary feature of the capitalist mode of production as a general social condition. If that surplus labour did not exist, other people could not appropriate that surplus labour or its products simply through their ownership of property.

Also, the amount of unpaid, voluntary and housework labor performed outside the world of business and industry, as revealed by time use surveys, suggests to some feminists (e.g. Marilyn Waring and Maria Mies) that Marxists may have overrated the importance of industrial surplus labour performed by salaried employees, because the very ability to perform that surplus-labour, i.e. the continual reproduction of labour power depends on all kinds of supports involving unremunerated work (for a theoretical discussion, see the reader by Bonnie Fox). In other words, work performed in households—often by those who do not sell their labour power to capitalist enterprises at all—contributes to the sustenance of capitalist workers who may perform little household labour.

Possibly the controversy about the concept is distorted by the enormous differences with regard to the world of work:

- in Europe, the United States, Japan and Australasia,
- the newly industrialising countries, and
- the poor countries.

Countries differ greatly with respect to the way they organise and share out work, labour participation rates, and paid hours worked per year, as can be easily verified from ILO data (see also Rubery & Grimshaw's text). The general trend in the world division of labour is for hi-tech, financial and marketing services to be located in the richer countries, which hold most intellectual property rights and actual physical production to be located in low-wage countries. Effectively, Marxian economists argue, this means that the labour of workers in wealthy countries is valued higher than the labour of workers in poorer countries. However, they predict that in the long run of history, the operation of the law of value will tend to equalize the conditions of production and sales in different parts of the world.

== See also ==
- Abstract and concrete labour
- Capital accumulation
- Capitalist mode of production
- Economic surplus
- labor power
- labor theory of value
- Productive and unproductive labor
- Reserve army of labour
- Spatial mismatch
- Surplus product
- Surplus value
