= Productive and unproductive labour =

Concepts used in classical political economy

Productive and unproductive labour are concepts that were used in classical political economy mainly in the 18th and 19th centuries, which survive today to some extent in modern management discussions, economic sociology and Marxist or Marxian economic analysis. The concepts strongly influenced the construction of national accounts in the Soviet Union and other Soviet-type societies (see Material Product System).

== Classical political economy ==
The classical political economists, such as Adam Smith and David Ricardo, raised the economic question of which kinds of labour contributed to increasing society's wealth, as against activities which do not increase wealth. In the introduction to The Wealth of Nations, Smith spoke of the "annual labour" and "the necessaries and conveniences" a nation "annually consumes" before explaining that one of the two steps to increase wealth is reducing the amount of "unproductive labour". "Annual" and "annually" refer to a cyclical reproduction process; "unproductive labor" are commodities and services which are not inputs to the next economic cycle and are therefore lost to economic growth. In contrast, theories with no such time horizon tend to understand Smith's unproductive labor as referring to services, and productive labor as meaning vendible goods. Smith’s distinction between productive and unproductive labor corresponds to Sraffa’s distinction of basic and non-basic goods, as basic goods re-enter the productive process, whereas non-basic goods are destined for consumption, with no value for reproduction.

There is one sort of labour which adds to the value of the subject upon which it is bestowed; there is another which has no such effect. The former, as it produces a value, may be called productive; the latter, unproductive labour. Thus the labour of a manufacturer adds, generally, to the value of the materials which he works upon, that of his own maintenance, and of his master's profit. The labour of a menial servant, on the contrary, adds to the value of nothing. Though the manufacturer has his wages advanced to him by his master, he, in reality, costs him no expense, the value of those wages being generally restored, together with a profit, in the improved value of the subject upon which his labour is bestowed. But the maintenance of a menial servant never is restored. A man grows rich by employing a multitude of manufacturers; he grows poor by maintaining a multitude of menial servants. The labour of the latter, however, has its value, and deserves its reward as well

— Adam Smith, The Wealth of Nations, Book 2, Chapter 3 (Andrew Skinner edition 1974, p. 429-430)

As Edwin Cannan observes, Smith’s view of annual reproduction and as a consequence the distinction of productive and unproductive labor stems from his meeting, and the influence of, the French economists have known as the Physiocrats. Before his visit to France in his Theory of Moral Sentiments Adam Smith sees the gluttony of the landlords as an "invisible hand" which helps the poor to partake in the landlord's wealth. In The Wealth of Nations, it is seen as the consumption of unproductive labor, limiting the growth of wealth. Smith's view that human labour – but not unproductive labour – is the source of wealth reflects the classical position that all commodities can be reduced to actual labour and produced inputs which in turn resolve into labour and former inputs.

Within an enterprise, for example, there were many tasks that had to be performed, such as cleaning, record keeping, and bookkeeping, and repairs, which did not directly contribute to producing and increasing wealth in the sense of making a net addition to it – in other words, such tasks represented a net cost to the enterprise which had to be minimized.

There were also whole occupations such as domestic servants, soldiers, schoolteachers, etc. which, although necessary, did not seem "productive" in the sense of increasing the material wealth of a society.

Part of the population consumed wealth but did not create it. To maximize economic growth, therefore, "unproductive costs" which consumed part of the total national income rather than adding to it should be minimized; productive labor had to be maximized.

Many different economic and moral arguments were made to either justify or else criticize the incomes gained from different activities, on the ground that they were "productive" or "unproductive", "earned" or "unearned", "wealth-creating" or "wealth-consuming".

== Neoclassical economics ==
In neoclassical economics, the distinction between productive and unproductive labour was however rejected as being largely arbitrary and irrelevant. All the factors of production (land, labour and capital) create wealth and add value; they are all "productive".

If the value of a good is just what somebody is its marginal utility, then regarding some activities as value-creating and others not is a purely subjective matter; any activity which produces anything, or generates an income, could be considered production and productive, and the only question that remains is how productive it is.

This could be measured by striking a ratio between the monetary value of output produced, and the number of hours worked to produce it (or the number of workers who produce it). This is called a "output/labour ratio". The ratio "GDP per capita" is also used by some as an indicator of how productive a population is.

However, in calculating any output value, some concept of value is nevertheless required, because we cannot relate, group and aggregate prices (real or notional) at all without using a valuation principle. All accounting assumes a value theory, in this sense - we always need to distinguish conceptually the definition of value equivalence, comparable value, value transfer, loss of value, conservation of value and newly created value. For this purpose, a knowledge of prices is ultimately not sufficient, since the decision to group and categorize prices in a certain way involves criteria and valuations which themselves cannot be derived from prices.

A persisting management preoccupation, particularly in large corporations, also concerns the question of which activities of a business are value adding. The reason is simply that value-adding activities boost gross income and profit margins (note that the "value-added" concept is a measure of the net output, or gross income, after deduction of materials costs from the total sales volume).

If the aim is to realise maximum shareholder value, two important valuation problems occur. Firstly, productive assets being used in production have no actual market price, being withdrawn from the market and not offered for sale. They have at best an historic cost, but this cost does not apply to inventories of new output produced. The current value of productive assets can therefore be estimated only according to a probable price that they would have, if they were sold, or if they were replaced. Secondly, there is the problem of what exactly the increases or decreases in the value of productive assets being held can be attributed to.

In what has become popularly known as "value-based management", these problems are pragmatically tackled with the accounting concepts of market-value added (MVA) and economic value-added (EVA). This style of management focuses very closely on how assets and activities contribute to maximum profit income.

== National accounts ==
In national accounts and social accounting theory the concepts of productive and unproductive labour do survive to some extent.

- The first reason is that if we want to estimate and account for the value of the net new output created by a country in a year, we must be able to distinguish between sources of new value added and conserved or transferred value. In other words, we need a value-theoretic principle which guides us in relating, grouping and computing price-aggregates. It is obvious that if products or incomes are merely exchanged or transferred between A and B, then the total product value, or total income, does not increase; all that has happened here is, that they have been shifted around, and redistributed. Total wealth has not increased, no new value was added. By implication, some activities add new value, others do not.
- Secondly, it is necessary to create an operational statistical coverage of production itself, which can be used to allocate incomes, activities and transactions in the economy as either belonging to "production", or falling outside "production". Thus, some work produces something in the economic sense, other work does not. In general, national accounts adopt a very wide definition of production; it is defined as any activity of resident "institutional units" (enterprises, public services, households) combining the factors of production (land, labour and capital) to transform inputs into outputs. This includes both market production as well as non-market production, if it recognisably generates an income. The advantage of the wide definition is, that practically all flows of production-related income can be captured (but at the same time a large amount of unpaid work -housework and voluntary work - is not accounted for). Nevertheless, some incomes are ruled out of production and regarded as transfers of wealth. A transfer is defined basically as a payment made or income received without providing any good, service or asset in return, for example: government benefits. Some forms of interest on loans, some property rents, and most capital gains on financial assets and property are also excluded, they are effectively transfers (flows of income and expenditure which are regarded as unrelated to production and to the value of new output) or intermediate expenditure.
- Thirdly, national accounts will show the contribution of different economic sectors to the total national product or national income. These sectors are mainly output-defined (e.g. agriculture, manufacturing, business services, government administration). It is therefore possible to distinguish to some extent between "productive" activities producing some tangible product or service, and other commercial or government activities which do not (yet generate incomes).

A large amount of work done in society is not captured in national accounts, because it is unpaid voluntary labour or unpaid household labour. The monetary value of this work can be estimated only from time use surveys. Thus, national accounting definitions of "production" are strongly biased towards activities which yield a money-income.

== Marx's critique ==
Karl Marx regarded land and labour as the source of all wealth, and distinguished between material wealth and human wealth. Human wealth was a wealth in social relations, and the expansion of market trade created ever more of those. However, wealth and economic value were not the same thing in his view; value was a purely social category, a social attribution.

Both in Das Kapital and in Theories of Surplus-Value, Marx devoted a considerable amount of attention to the concept of "productive and unproductive labour". He sought to establish what economic and commercial ideas about productive labour would mean for the lives of the working class, and he wanted to criticise apologetic ideas about the "productive" nature of particular activities. This was part of an argument about the source of surplus value in unpaid surplus labour. His view can be summarised in the following 10 points.

- work is not "naturally productive", both in the sense that it takes work to make work productive, and that productive work depends on tools and techniques to be productive.
- generally speaking, a worker is economically productive and a source of additional wealth to the extent that they can produce more than is required for their own subsistence (i.e., is capable of performing surplus-labour) and adding to a surplus product.
- the definition of productive and unproductive labour is specific to each specific type of society (for example, feudal society, capitalist society, socialist society etc.) and depends on the given relations of production.
- there exists no neutral definition of productive and unproductive labour; what is productive from the point of view of one social class may not be productive from the point of view of another.
- the only objective definition of productive labour is in terms of what is as a matter of fact productive within the conditions of a given mode of production.
- from the point of view of the capitalist class, labour is productive, if it increases the value of (private) capital or results in (private) capital accumulation.
- Capitalistically productive labour is therefore labour which adds to the mass of surplus value, primarily through profitably producing goods and services for market sale.
- no new value is created through acts of exchange only; therefore, although labour which just facilitates exchange is "productive" from the employer's point of view (because they derive profit from it), it is unproductive from the social point of view because it accomplishes only a transfer of wealth. This "unproductive" labour is accepted however because it reduces the costs of capital accumulation, or facilitates it, or secures it.
- the definition of productive and unproductive labour is not static, but evolving; in the course of capitalist development, the division of labour is increasingly modified, to make more and more labour productive in the capitalistic sense, for example through marketisation and privatisation, value-based management, and Taylorism.
- whether work has been productive can really be known only "after the fact" in capitalist society, because commodity-producing living labour is in most cases definitely valued by the market only after it has been performed, when its product (a good or service) is exchanged and paid for.

Marx accordingly made, explicitly or implicitly, 10 distinctions relevant to defining productive labour in a capitalist mode of production:

- commodity production, versus other production
- capitalist production versus non-capitalist production
- production versus circulation (exchange)
- production for profit, versus non-profit production
- production of use values, versus production of exchange-values
- production of value, versus appropriation of revenue
- production of income, versus distribution of income

In most cases, using these distinctions, it would be obvious whether the labour was capitalistically productive or not, but in a minority of cases it would be not altogether clear or controversial. In part, that is because the division of labour is not static but constantly evolving. The general criterion which Marx suggests is that:

"If we have a function which, although in and for itself unproductive, is nevertheless a necessary moment of [economic] reproduction, then when this is transformed, through a division of labour, from the secondary activity of many into the exclusive activity of a few, into their special business, this does not change the character of the function itself".

Obviously, functions falling outside capitalist production altogether would not be capitalistically productive.

Generally, Marx seems to have regarded labour as mainly unproductive from the point of view of capitalist society as a whole, if it involved functions which have to do purely with:

- the maintenance of a class-based social order as such (legal system, police, military, government administration).
- the maintenance and securing of private property relations (police, security, legal system, banking, accounting, licensing authorities etc.).
- operating financial transactions (in banking, financing, commercial trade, financial administration)
- insurance and safety.
- criminal activity.

Such activities were an inevitable cost to capitalist society which had to be met from reserves and from current income. This didn't necessarily mean that unproductive functions are not socially useful or economically useful in some sense; they might well be, but they normally did not directly add net new value to the total social product, that was the point, they were a (necessary) financial cost to society, paid for by a transfer of value created by the productive sector. Thus, they represented an appropriation or deduction from the surplus product, and not a net addition to it. Obviously, unproductive activities could stimulate productive activities however (for example, the production of security installations). Many unproductive costs are accepted by business, either because they involve activities which lower total business costs, and thereby indirectly contribute to income, or because they are unavoidable in doing business.

In the division of labour of modern advanced societies, unproductive functions in this Marxian sense occupy a very large part of the labour force; the wealthier a society is, the more "unproductive" functions it can afford. In the USA for example, one can calculate from labour force data that facilitating exchange processes and processing financial claims alone is the main activity of more than 20 million workers. Legal staff, police, security personnel and military employees number almost 5 million workers.

== Productive labour as misfortune ==
In the first volume of Das Kapital, Marx suggests that productive labour may be a misfortune:

That labourer alone is productive, who produces surplus-value for the capitalist, and thus works for the valorisation of capital. If we may take an example from outside the sphere of production of material objects, a schoolmaster is a productive labourer when, in addition to belabouring the heads of his scholars, he works like a horse to enrich the school proprietor. That the latter has laid out his capital in a teaching factory, instead of in a sausage factory, does not alter the relation. Hence the notion of a productive labourer implies not merely a relation between work and useful effect, between labourer and product of labour, but also a specific, social relation of production, a relation that has sprung up historically and stamps the labourer as the direct means of creating surplus-value. To be a productive labourer is, therefore, not a piece of luck, but a misfortune.

The idea here seems to be that being capitalistically "productive" effectively means "being exploited," or, at least, being employed to do work under the authority of someone else. Marx never finalised his concept of capitalistically productive labour, but clearly it involved both a technical relation (between work and its useful effect) and a social relation (the economic framework within which it was performed).

== Ecological critique ==
The ecological critique focuses on mindless "production for production's sake", attacking both the neoclassical notion and the Marxist concept of "productiveness". It is argued neoclassical economics can understand the value of anything (and therefore the costs and benefits of an activity) only if it has a price, real or imputed. However, physical and human resources may have a value which cannot be expressed in price terms, and to turn them into an object of trade via some legal specification of property rights may be harmful to human life on earth. Activities may have non-priced costs and benefits which never feature on the balance sheet, at most in propaganda and advertising.

The Marxian view is also dismissed by ecologists, because it argues only human labour-time is the substance and source of economic value in capitalist society. Again, it is argued a very restricted idea of economic value is being operated with by Marxists. In part, this misses Marx's own point, namely that it was not him, but the growth of commercial trade which made labour-exploitation the fulcrum of wealth creation. Nevertheless, the ecological argument is that for the sake of a healthy future and a sustainable biosphere, a new valuation scheme for people and resources needs to be adopted.

The core of this critique is clearly an ethical one: all the existing economic theories provide no healthy norms that would ensure correct stewardship for the environment in which all people have to live. Markets provide no moral norms of their own apart from the law of contract. To develop a better concept of "productiveness" would require a new morality, a new view of human beings and the environment in which they live, so that harmful economic activity can be outlawed, and healthy alternatives promoted.

Ecologists typically distinguish between "good" and "bad" market trade and production. Some believe capitalism can "go green" (producing in an environmentally friendly way), and that capitalism is "cleaner" than Soviet-type socialism. Others think that capitalism cannot "go green" because of the nature of the beast; so long as human accounting is done in terms of private costs and private profits, many "external effects" (externalities) will be disregarded, and at most legal restrictions and taxation can limit the environmental damage somewhat.

== Material product accounts in Soviet-type societies ==
In the Soviet Union and later other socialist countries in Eastern Europe, China and Cuba, a system of social accounts was created based around the notion of the "material product" (Material Product System, or MPS). This was an alternative to GDP based accounts. Behind the MPS was a modernization theory according to which the criterion of progress consisted of the physical quantity of material goods being produced.

This system was, paradoxically, strongly influenced by Marx's critique of wealth creation in capitalist society, and his distinction between capitalistically productive and unproductive labour. The "material product" represented, in price terms, the net new value created annually by the production of tangible material goods. Many service industries were excluded from the material product; a rigorous statistical attempt was made to separate out a productive sector and an unproductive sector. Enterprise managers could be punished by law if they failed to provide accurate information.

Dissident socialists objected to this approach, because they felt that in a socialist society, "productive" labour should really be defined by such things as:

- whether the labour increases tangible wealth
- whether it is socially useful
- whether it is ecologically responsible
- whether it promotes human satisfaction
- whether it promotes human development
- whether it promotes human health and wellbeing

Since the end of communist rule in the USSR and Eastern Europe, however, the material product system has been abandoned, and new GDP-based accounts have been implemented following international standards recommended by the International Monetary Fund, the World Bank, and the United Nations System of National Accounts (UNSNA). The advantage of this change is that economic activity is more comprehensively valued and visible in monetary terms; a possible disadvantage is that no national accounting is done anymore of physical product units (e.g., x tons of steel produced, or y number of tractors assembled).

== See also ==
- Division of labour
- Labour theory of value
- National accounts
- Surplus value
- Value added
