= American Time Use Survey =

Household survey

Agency overview
- Formed: 2003
- Jurisdiction: United States
- Headquarters: Washington, D.C.
- Employees: Conducted by ~2,190 households/month (≈ 26,400/year)
- Parent agency: Bureau of Labor Statistics (BLS); United States Census Bureau (USCB)
- Website: www.bls.gov/tus

The American Time Use Survey (ATUS), sponsored by the Bureau of Labor Statistics (BLS) and conducted by the United States Census Bureau (USCB), is a time-use survey which provides measures of the amounts of time people spend on various activities, including working, leisure, childcare, and household activities. The survey has been conducted annually since 2003.

== Methodology ==
Eligible survey participants are households that have completed all eight months of the Current Population Survey (CPS). Of the eligible households, those representing a range of demographic characteristics are selected to participate in the survey. Between 2–5 months after the household's eighth and final CPS interview, one randomly-selected person of at least fifteen years of age is selected from each household to be interviewed for the ATUS and asked questions about their time use.

=== Sample size ===
Since December 2003, the ATUS sample has been 2,190 households per month (approximately 26,400 households per year). The ATUS sample was initially 3,375 households per month (approximately 40,500 households per year), but was reduced to lower costs. The selected households are categorized into one of twelve strata based on race/ethnicity (Hispanic, Non-Hispanic black, Non-Hispanic non-black) and household type (child under age six, child between age six and age seventeen, single adult no children, two or more adults no children).

== Data ==
The ATUS data include:

- Time spent by the civilian population in primary activities, including daily averages by age, sex, race, Hispanic or Latino ethnicity, marital status, and educational attainment, averages for weekdays vs weekends and holidays, and averages by time of day
- Time spent by employed persons working and working at home or at their workplace, by full-time and part-time status and sex, jobholding status, educational attainment, class of worker, earnings, industry, occupation, time of day, and day of week
- Time spent by married mothers and married fathers in primary activities, including averages by employment status
- Time spent by over age eighteen civilian population in primary activities by age of youngest household child and sex, for employed vs non-employed
- Time spent in leisure and sports by selected characteristics

From 2005 to 2010, the ATUS included questions relating to overnight trips. In January 2011, the overnight trips questions were replaced by questions relating to eldercare.

In the 2025 results, 35 percent of employed people did some or all of their work at home on days they worked, and 70 percent did some or all of their work at their workplace. Full-time employees averaged 8.1 hours of work on days they worked. On an average day, 81 percent of people performed household activities and spent about two hours on them. The Bureau of Labor Statistics cautioned that the suspension of survey operations from October 1 through November 12 during the 2025 federal government shutdown may have affected the annual estimates, and that the effect could not be quantified.

=== Modules ===
The ATUS sometimes includes special questions, called modules, at the end of the interview. The ATUS added an Eating & Health module from 2006 to 2008 and 2014–2016, a Well-Being Module in 2010, 2012, and 2013, and a Leave module, relating to workers' access to leave, in 2011.

=== Data uses ===
ATUS data are used by the Bureau of Economic Analysis (BEA) to account for the value of household production, the Bureau of Transportation Statistics (BTS) in their Passenger Travel: Facts and Figures report, and the Economic Research Service (ERS) to examine how time use patterns of eating affect health.

ATUS data have also been used to help research worker productivity, social isolation, and how working parents balance the activities in their lives.

== See also ==
- List of household surveys in the United States
- Time-use survey
