= Valorisation =

Marxist concept

In Marxism, the valorisation or valorization of capital is the increase in the value of capital assets through the application of value-forming labour in production. The German original term is "Verwertung" (specifically Kapitalverwertung) but this is difficult to translate. The first translation of Capital by Samuel Moore and Edward Aveling, under Engels' editorship, renders "Verwertung" in different ways depending on the context, for example as "creation of surplus-value", "self-expanding value", "increase in value" and similar expressions. These renderings were also used in the US Untermann revised edition, and the Eden and Cedar Paul translation. It has also been wrongly rendered as "realisation of capital".

In German, the general meaning of "Verwertung" is the productive use of a resource, and more specifically the use or application of something (an object, process or activity) so that it makes money, or generates value, with the connotation that the thing validates itself and proves its worth when it results in earnings, a yield. Thus, something is "valorised" if it has yielded its value (which could be use-value or exchange-value). Similarly, Marx's specific concept refers both to the process whereby a capital value is conferred or bestowed on something, and to the increase in the value of a capital asset, within the sphere of production.

In modern translations of Marx's economic writings, such as the Penguin edition of Capital and the English Marx-Engels Collected Works, the term valorisation (as in French) is preferred because it is recognized that it denotes a highly specific economic concept, i.e., a term with a technical meaning.

== Definition ==
Marx first refers the concept of valorization in chapter 4 of Capital, Volume I, when he discusses the capitalist activity of buying commodities in order to sell them, and realize more value than existed before. Marx writes:

This increment or excess over the original value I call 'surplus-value'. The value originally advanced, therefore, not only remains intact while in circulation, but increases its magnitude, adds to itself a surplus-value, or is valorized [verwertet sich]. And this movement converts it into capital.

The question then arises of how net new value can continuously and spontaneously emerge from trading activity. Marx's answer is that net additional value can be realized in trading, because that additional value is already created previously in the production process. If a capitalist buys commodities for $100 and sells them for $120 then he has certainly made money, but he hasn't truly created more value than existed before, since the quantity of commodities is still exactly what it was before. To create more value requires extra production. At that point, the concept of valorization is modified.

The capitalist production process, Marx argues, is both a labour process creating use-values and a value-creation process through which additional new value is created. However, value creation as such is not what the capitalist aims at. The capitalist wants his capital to increase. This means that the worker must create more value for the capitalist than he receives as wage from the capitalist. The worker must create not only new value but surplus value. A value creation process which goes beyond the point at which the worker has just created the equivalent of the value of his own labour power, and begins to increase the value of capital, is a valorisation process, not just a value creation process.

Valorisation thus specifically describes the increase in the value of capital assets through the application of living, value-forming labour in production. The "problem" of valorisation is: how can labour be applied in production so that capital value grows? How can assets be invested productively, so that they gain value rather than lose it? In Theories of Surplus Value, chapter 3 section 6, Marx emphasizes his view that "Capital is productive of value only as a relation, in so far as it is a coercive force on wage-labour, compelling it to perform surplus-labour, or spurring on the productive power of labour to produce relative surplus-value."

== The mysteries of capital's growth ==
When a worker is put to work on a commercial basis, he initially produces a value equal to what it costs to hire him. But once this value has been created, and the work continues, he begins to valorise capital, i.e. increase its value. Thus, normally a worker works part of the day "for himself" in the sense of producing the equivalent of his wage, and part of the day for the employer of his labour.

== Valorisation and management theory ==
By contrast, in management theory, analysts are extremely aware of value adding activities occurring when factors of production are withdrawn from the market in order to produce new outputs with them. That is because they aim to maximize productivity, i.e. get as much work and product out of the workers as efficiently as possible.

Yet, because perceptions of value growth are based on the relationship between input costs and sales revenue, revealed by accounts, the central role of living labour in conserving, transferring and creating value is still obscured.

The official story is that the factors of production all add value to the new output. In a sense this is true, since living labour conserves and transfers value from materials and equipment to the new product; and capitalist production could not occur if capitalists did not supply capital in return for profit. But without the active human subject, no new value is created at all, and capital assets lose value. This becomes apparent when workers go on strike.

== Devalorisation ==
The opposite process is devalorisation ("Entwertung") which refers to the process whereby production capital invested loses part or all of its value, because the labour maintaining the value of capital is withdrawn, or because output cannot be sold, or sold at the intended price, or because more modern production techniques devalue older equipment.

Over time capitalist assertion of valorisation can be seen to always depreciate over extended periods of time. Marx describes the effect as “tendency for the profit rate to fall”. Revitalised by the likes of Kliman (2010, cited in Giacché 2011) and Perri (2010, cited in Giacché 2011), who in compliance with Marx's theory believe that although valorisation is the driving force of capitalisation, it also contributes to an impending downfall. However, due to excessive supply requirements and ever increasing demand from the global markets, industrial collapses tend to operate in favour of the emergence of new independent capitals.

Typically what happens in a severe economic crisis is that the real cost structure of production is realigned with market prices. In Marx's terms, productivity growth has changed product-values in different sectors, but it is only after quite some time that prices adjust to changed underlying values. In that case, devalorisation may occur quite rapidly: capital assets are suddenly worth less, and as soon as capital assets are no longer utilised and maintained by living human labour (because of unemployment), the value of those capital assets begins to deteriorate. In the end, the total withdrawal of human labour leaves nothing but a ghost town.

Devalorisation is not the same as devaluation of capital, because the term "devalorisation" applies specifically only to assets which function as production capital, whereas "devaluation" of capital could refer to the loss in value of any capital asset in any particular form. Devalorization means specifically that means of production lose value because the living labour required to maintain them is withdrawn.

== Valorisation and the realisation of capital ==
Valorisation of capital is for Marx not at all the same as the "realisation of capital". Value may be added in the production process, but this additional value may not be realised as an additional sum of money, unless the outputs are sold at a favourable price.

At an unfavourable price, output is sold without increasing capital assets. So, the new value added in production may be lost to the producer or owner, when the new product is traded. The capital is "valorized" because a new output value has been created, but the value-increase is not (fully) realized by its owner.

In reality, Marx argues, the valorisation of capital in one enterprise is dependent on the valorisation of many related enterprises, since they all influence each other with respect to costs, values and prices. When all is said, the preservation and increase of capital value is a purely social phenomenon.

== Rate of valorisation ==
In Capital Vol. 3 (Penguin ed., p. 136) Marx defines the rate of valorisation as S/C where "S" is the surplus value produced and "C" is the total capital invested to produce it. This is strictly a value ratio, a relationship between value proportions, not to be confused with the rate of profit on capital invested, since the amount of surplus value yielded by a capital investment, corresponding to a certain quantity of labour-time expended in production, typically diverges from that part of the surplus value which is realized as profit, since at any time products are likely to be traded above or below their value, rather than at prices which exactly reflect their value (Marx often assumes for the purpose of his analysis that the total mass of profit and the total surplus-value are the same magnitude, although in reality they can vary from each other, due to continual changes in labour productivity across time, imperfect pricing, and imperfect competition).

== The conflict between physical output growth and valorisation ==
In Capital Vol. 3, chapter 15, section 2 (Penguin ed., pp. 355f) Marx discusses how conflicts arise between expanding physical output and the valorization of capital. From the point of view of capital, increased productivity means both increase in the scale of production and a reduction of labour-costs as a fraction of the total capital invested. From the point of view of labour, increased productivity means both an increase in surplus labour and an increase in the amount of capital used per worker. Marx then explains that these four variables can come into conflict with each other, creating disturbances in the growth process of capital:

"Simultaneously with impulses towards a genuine increase in the working population, which stem from the increase in the portion of the total social product that functions as capital, we have those agencies that create a relative surplus population. Simultaneously with the fall in the profit rate, the mass of capital grows, and this is associated with a devaluation of the existing capital, which puts a stop to this fall and gives an accelerating impulse to the accumulation of capital value. Simultaneously with the development of productivity, the composition of capital becomes higher, there is a relative decline in the variable portion as against the constant. These various influences sometimes tend to exhibit themselves side by side, spatially; at other times one after the other, temporally; and at certain points the conflict of contending agencies breaks through in crises. Crises are never more than momentary, violent solutions for the existing contradictions, violent eruptions that re-establish the disturbed balance for the time being. To express this contradiction in the most general terms, it consists in the fact that the capitalist mode of production tends towards an absolute development of the productive forces irrespective of value and the surplus value this contains, and even irrespective of the social relations within which capitalist production takes place; while on the other hand its purpose is to maintain the existing capital value and to valorize it to the utmost extent possible (i.e. an ever accelerated increase in this value). In its specific character it is directed towards using the existing capital value as a means for the greatest possible valorization of this value. The methods through which it attains this end involve a decline in the profit rate, the devaluation of the existing capital and the development of the productive forces of labour at the cost of the productive forces already produced." (pp. 357–358)

== See also ==
- Capital accumulation
- Constant capital
- Labour theory of value
- Relations of production
- Surplus value
- Value added
- Value-form
- Value product
