= Surplus value =

Concept in economics

Diagram illustrating Marx's theory of surplus value

In Marxian economics, surplus value is the difference between the amount raised through a sale of a product and the amount it cost to manufacture it: i.e. the amount raised through sale of the product minus the cost of the materials, plant and labour power. The concept originated in Ricardian socialism, with the term "surplus value" itself being coined by William Thompson in 1824; however, it was not consistently distinguished from the related concepts of surplus labour and surplus product. The concept was subsequently developed and popularised by Karl Marx. Marx's formulation is the standard sense and the primary basis for further developments, though how much of Marx's concept is original and distinct from the Ricardian concept is disputed (see § Origin). Marx's term is the German word "Mehrwert", which simply means value added (sales revenue minus the cost of materials used up), and is cognate to English "more worth".

It is a major concept in Karl Marx's critique of political economy, underpinning a variety of his theories related to the function of capitalism and the exploitation of the working class. Conventionally, value-added is equal to the sum of gross wage income and gross profit income. However, Marx uses the term Mehrwert to describe the yield, profit or return on production capital invested, i.e. the amount of the increase in the value of capital. Hence, Marx's use of Mehrwert has always been translated as "surplus value", distinguishing it from "value-added". According to Marx's theory, surplus value is equal to the new value created by workers in excess of their own labour-cost, which is appropriated by the capitalist as profit when products are sold. Marx thought that the gigantic increase in wealth and population from the 19th century onwards was mainly due to the competitive striving to obtain maximum surplus-value from the employment of labour, resulting in an equally gigantic increase of productivity and capital resources. To the extent that increasingly the economic surplus is convertible into money and expressed in money, the amassment of wealth is possible on a larger and larger scale (see capital accumulation and surplus product). The concept is closely connected to producer surplus.

== Origin ==
By the Age of Enlightenment in the 18th century the French physiocrats were already writing on the hypothesis that surplus value that was being extracted from labour by "the employer, the owner, and all exploiters" although they used the term net product. The concept of surplus value continued to be developed under Adam Smith who also used the term "net product" while his successors the Ricardian socialists, began using the term "surplus value" decades later, after its coinage by William Thompson in 1824:

Two measures of the value of this use, here present themselves; the measure of the labourer, and the measure of the capitalist. The measure of the labourer consists in the contribution of such sums as would replace the waste and value of the capital by the time it would be consumed, with such added compensation to the owner and superintendent of it as would support him in equal comfort with the more actively employed productive labourers. The measure of the capitalist, on the contrary, would be the additional value produced by the same quantity of labour in consequence of the use of the machinery or other capital; the whole of such surplus value to be enjoyed by the capitalist for his superior intelligence and skill in accumulating and advancing to the labourer his capital or the use of it.

— William Thompson, An Inquiry into the Principles of the Distribution of Wealth (1824), p. 128 (2nd ed.), emphasis added

William Godwin and Charles Hall are also credited as earlier developers of the concept. Early authors also used the terms "surplus labour" and "surplus produce" (in Marx's language, surplus product), which have distinct meanings in Marxian economics: surplus labour produces surplus product, which has surplus value. Some authors consider Marx as completely borrowing from Thompson, notably Anton Menger:

... Marx is completely under the influence of the earlier English socialists, and more particularly of William Thompson. ... [T]he whole theory of surplus value, its conception, its name, and the estimates of its amounts are borrowed in all essentials from Thompson's writings.

...

Cf. Marx, Das Kapital, English trans. 1887, pp. 156, 194, 289, with Thompson, Distribution of Wealth, p. 163; 2nd ed. p. 125. ... The real discovers of the theory of surplus value are Godwin, Hall, and especially W. Thompson.

— Anton Menger, The Right to the Whole Produce of Labour (1886), p. 101

This claim of priority has been vigorously contested, notably in an article by Friedrich Engels, completed by Karl Kautsky and published anonymously in 1887, reacting to and criticising Menger in a review of his The Right to the Whole Produce of Labour, arguing that there is nothing in common but the term "surplus value" itself.

An intermediate position acknowledges the early development by Ricardian socialists and others, but credits Marx with substantial development. For example: (Note: Spago incorrectly claims that "surplus value" appears in The Source and Remedy of the National Difficulties (1821), by Charles Wentworth Dilke, claiming that "the quantity of the surplus value appropriated by the capitalist" appears in that text. This is a misreading of the Preface to Capital, Volume II by Engels, who quotes from this pamphlet but uses the phrase himself (not in quotes); the pamphlet uses "surplus labour".)

What is original in Marx is the explanation of the manner in which surplus value is produced.

— John Spargo, Socialism (1906)

Johann Karl Rodbertus developed a theory of surplus value in the 1830s and 1840s, notably in Zur Erkenntnis unserer staatswirthschaftlichen Zustände (Toward an appreciation of our economic circumstances, 1842), and claimed earlier priority to Marx, specifically to have "shown practically in the same way as Marx, only more briefly and clearly, the source of the surplus value of the capitalists". The debate, taking the side of Marx's priority, is detailed in the Preface to Capital, Volume II by Engels.

Marx first elaborated his doctrine of surplus value in 1857–58 manuscripts of A Contribution to the Critique of Political Economy (1859), following earlier developments in his 1840s writings. It forms the subject of his 1862–63 manuscript Theories of Surplus Value (which was subsequently published as Capital, Volume IV), and features in his Capital, Volume I (1867).

== Theory ==
The problem of explaining the source of surplus value is expressed by Friedrich Engels as follows:

Whence comes this surplus-value? It cannot come either from the buyer buying the commodities under their value, or from the seller selling them above their value. For in both cases the gains and the losses of each individual cancel each other, as each individual is in turn buyer and seller. Nor can it come from cheating, for though cheating can enrich one person at the expense of another, it cannot increase the total sum possessed by both, and therefore cannot augment the sum of the values in circulation. (...) This problem must be solved, and it must be solved in a purely economic way, excluding all cheating and the intervention of any force — the problem being: how is it possible constantly to sell dearer than one has bought, even on the hypothesis that equal values are always exchanged for equal values?

Marx's solution was first to distinguish between labour-time worked and labour power, and secondly to distinguish between absolute surplus value and relative surplus value. A worker who is sufficiently productive can produce an output value greater than what it costs to hire them. Although their wage seems to be based on hours worked, in an economic sense this wage does not reflect the full value of what the worker produces. Effectively it is not labour which the worker sells, but their capacity to work.

Imagine a worker who is hired for an hour and paid $10 per hour. Once in the capitalist's employ, the capitalist can have them operate a boot-making machine with which the worker produces $10 worth of work every 15 minutes. Every hour, the capitalist receives $40 worth of work and only pays the worker $10, capturing the remaining $30 as gross revenue. Once the capitalist has deducted fixed and variable operating costs of (say) $20 (leather, depreciation of the machine, etc.), he is left with $10. Thus, for an outlay of capital of $30, the capitalist obtains a surplus value of $10; their capital has not only been replaced by the operation, but also has increased by $10.

This "simple" exploitation characterises the realisation of absolute surplus value, which is then claimed by the capitalist. The worker cannot capture this benefit directly because they have no claim to the means of production (e.g. the boot-making machine) or to its products, and his capacity to bargain over wages is restricted by laws and the supply/demand for wage labour. This form of exploitation was well understood by pre-Marxian Socialists and left-wing followers of Ricardo, such as Proudhon, and by early labour organisers, who sought to unite workers in unions capable of collective bargaining, in order to gain a share of profits and limit the length of the working day.

Relative surplus value is not created in a single enterprise or site of production. It arises instead from the total relation between multiple enterprises and multiple branches of industry when the necessary labour-time of production is reduced, effecting a change in the value of labour-power. For example, when new technology or new business practices increase the productivity of labour a capitalist already employs, or when the commodities necessary for workers' subsistence fall in value, the amount of socially necessary labour-time is decreased, the value of labour-power is reduced, and a relative surplus value is realised as profit for the capitalist, increasing the overall general rate of surplus value in the total economy:

The surplus-value produced by prolongation of the working day, I call absolute surplus-value. On the other hand, the surplus-value arising from the curtailment of the necessary labour-time, and from the corresponding alteration in the respective lengths of the two components of the working day, I call relative surplus-value.

In order to effect a fall in the value of labour-power, the increase in the productiveness of labour must seize upon those branches of industry whose products determine the value of labour-power, and consequently either belong to the class of customary means of subsistence, or are capable of supplying the place of those means. But the value of a commodity is determined, not only by the quantity of labour which the labourer directly bestows upon that commodity, but also by the labour contained in the means of production. For instance, the value of a pair of boots depends not only on the cobbler’s labour, but also on the value of the leather, wax, thread, &c. Hence, a fall in the value of labour-power is also brought about by an increase in the productiveness of labour, and by a corresponding cheapening of commodities in those industries which supply the instruments of labour and the raw material, that form the material elements of the constant capital required for producing the necessaries of life.

— Marx, Capital Vol. 1, ch. 12, "The Concept of Relative Surplus-Value"

== Definition ==
In Marxian economics, surplus value is the difference in value created by workers in the process of production and the wages they receive in exchange for their labor. In a capitalist system of production, workers sell their labor power to capitalists in exchange for their wages. However, the value produced by workers during a workday exceeds the amount required to reproduce workers' labor power, as embodied by their wages. This excess value is kept by the capitalists as profit. Marx regarded this not as a symptom of fair exchange, but as a structural feature of capitalist production. Because workers do not own the means of production, they are required to sell their labor at a wage less than the value they create, enabling capitalists to grow wealth over time by reinvesting this surplus value. Marx linked this process and broader patterns of inequality, arguing it contributes to the concentration of wealth and continued class division within capitalist societies, and saw surplus value as central to understanding how economic growth can occur alongside unequal outcomes.

Total surplus-value in an economy (Marx refers to the mass or volume of surplus-value) is basically equal to the sum of net distributed and undistributed profit, net interest, net rents, net tax on production and various net receipts associated with royalties, licensing, leasing, certain honorariums etc. (see also value product). Of course, the way generic profit income is grossed and netted in social accounting may differ somewhat from the way an individual business does that (see also Operating surplus).

Marx's own discussion focuses mainly on profit, interest and rent, largely ignoring taxation and royalty-type fees which were proportionally very small components of the national income when he lived. Over the last 150 years, however, the role of the state in the economy has increased in almost every country in the world. Around 1850, the average share of government spending in GDP (See also Government spending) in the advanced capitalist economies was around 5%; in 1870, a bit above 8%; on the eve of World War I, just under 10%; just before the outbreak of World War II, around 20%; by 1950, nearly 30%; and today the average is around 35–40%. (see for example Alan Turner Peacock, "The growth of public expenditure", in Encyclopedia of Public Choice, Springer 2003, pp. 594–597).

== Interpretations ==
Surplus-value may be viewed in five ways:

- As a component of the new value product, which Marx himself defines as equal to the sum of labour costs in respect of capitalistically productive labour (variable capital) and surplus-value. In production, he argues, the workers produce a value equal to their wages plus an additional value, the surplus-value. They also transfer part of the value of fixed assets and materials to the new product, equal to economic depreciation (consumption of fixed capital) and intermediate goods used up (constant capital inputs). Labour costs and surplus-value are the monetary valuations of what Marx calls the necessary product and the surplus product, or paid labour and unpaid labour.
- Surplus-value can also be viewed as a flow of net income appropriated by the owners of capital in virtue of asset ownership, comprising both distributed personal income and undistributed business income. In the whole economy, this will include both income directly from production and property income.
- Surplus-value can be viewed as the source of society's accumulation fund or investment fund; part of it is re-invested, but part is appropriated as personal income, and used for consumptive purposes by the owners of capital assets (see capital accumulation); in exceptional circumstances, part of it may also be hoarded in some way. In this context, surplus value can also be measured as the increase in the value of the stock of capital assets through an accounting period, prior to distribution.
- Surplus-value can be viewed as a social relation of production, or as the monetary valuation of surplus-labour – a sort of "index" of the balance of power between social classes or nations in the process of the division of the social product.
- Surplus-value can, in a developed capitalist economy, be viewed also as an indicator of the level of social productivity that has been reached by the working population, i.e. the net amount of value it can produce with its labour in excess of its own consumption requirements.

== Equalisation of rates ==
Marx believed that the long-term historical tendency would be for differences in rates of surplus value between enterprises and economic sectors to level out, as Marx explains in two places in Capital Vol. 3:

If capitals that set in motion unequal quantities of living labour produce unequal amounts of surplus-value, this assumes that the level of exploitation of labour, or the rate of surplus-value, is the same, at least to a certain extent, or that the distinctions that exist here are balanced out by real or imaginary (conventional) grounds of compensation. This assumes competition among workers, and an equalisation that takes place by their constant migration between one sphere of production and another. Assume a general rate of surplus value of this kind, as a tendency, like all economic laws, as a theoretical simplification; but in any case this is in practice an actual presupposition of the capitalist mode of production, even if inhibited to a greater or lesser extent by practical frictions that produce more or less significant local differences, such as the settlement laws for agricultural labourers in England, for example. In theory, we assume that the laws of the capitalist mode of production develop in their pure form. In reality, this is only an approximation; but that approximation is all the more exact, the more the capitalist mode of production is developed and the less it is adulterated by survivals of earlier economic conditions with which it is amalgamated – Capital Vol. 3, ch. 10, Pelican edition p. 275.

Hence, he assumed a uniform rate of surplus value in his models of how surplus value would be shared out under competitive conditions.

== Appropriation from production ==
Both in Das Kapital and in preparatory manuscripts such as the Grundrisse and Results of the immediate process of production, Marx asserts that commerce by stages transforms a non-capitalist production process into a capitalist production process, integrating it fully into markets, so that all inputs and outputs become marketed goods or services. When that process is complete, according to Marx, the whole of production has become simultaneously a labor process creating use-values and a valorisation process creating new value, and more specifically a surplus-value appropriated as net income (see also capital accumulation).

Marx contends that the whole purpose of production in this situation becomes the growth of capital; i.e. that production of output becomes conditional on capital accumulation. If production becomes unprofitable, capital will be withdrawn from production sooner or later.

The implication is that the main driving force of capitalism becomes the quest to maximise the appropriation of surplus-value augmenting the stock of capital. The overriding motive behind efforts to economise resources and labour would thus be to obtain the maximum possible increase in income and capital assets ("business growth"), and provide a steady or growing return on investment.

== Absolute vs. relative ==
According to Marx, absolute surplus value is obtained by increasing the amount of time worked per worker in an accounting period. Marx talks mainly about the length of the working day or week, but in modern times the concern is about the number of hours worked per year.

In many parts of the world, as productivity rose, the workweek decreased from 60 hours to 50, 40 or 35 hours.

Relative surplus value is obtained mainly by:

- Reducing wages — this can only go to a certain point, because if wages fall below the ability of workers to purchase their means of subsistence, they will be unable to reproduce themselves and the capitalists will not be able to find sufficient labour power.
- Reducing the cost of wage-goods by various means, so that wage increases can be curbed.
- Increasing the productivity and intensity of labour generally, through mechanisation and rationalisation, yielding a bigger output per hour worked.

The attempt to extract more and more surplus-value from labour on the one side, and on the other side the resistance to this exploitation, are according to Marx at the core of the conflict between social classes, which is sometimes muted or hidden, but at other times erupts in open class warfare and class struggle.

== Production versus realisation ==
Marx distinguished sharply between value and price, in part because of the sharp distinction he draws between the production of surplus-value and the realisation of profit income (see also value-form). Output may be produced containing surplus-value (valorisation), but selling that output (realisation) is not at all an automatic process.

Until payment from sales is received, it is uncertain how much of the surplus-value produced will actually be realised as profit from sales. So, the magnitude of profit realised in the form of money and the magnitude of surplus-value produced in the form of products may differ greatly, depending on what happens to market prices and the vagaries of supply and demand fluctuations. This insight forms the basis of Marx's theory of market value, prices of production and the tendency of the rate of profit of different enterprises to be levelled out by competition.

In his published and unpublished manuscripts, Marx went into great detail to examine many different factors which could affect the production and realisation of surplus-value. He regarded this as crucial for the purpose of understanding the dynamics and dimensions of capitalist competition, not just business competition but also competition between capitalists and workers and among workers themselves. But his analysis did not go much beyond specifying some of the overall outcomes of the process.

His main conclusion though is that employers will aim to maximise the productivity of labour and economise on the use of labour, to reduce their unit-costs and maximise their net returns from sales at current market prices; at a given ruling market price for an output, every reduction of costs and every increase in productivity and sales turnover will increase profit income for that output. The main method is mechanisation, which raises the fixed capital outlay in investment.

In turn, this causes the unit-values of commodities to decline over time, and a decline of the average rate of profit in the sphere of production occurs, culminating in a crisis of capital accumulation, in which a sharp reduction in productive investments combines with mass unemployment, followed by an intensive rationalisation process of take-overs, mergers, fusions, and restructuring aiming to restore profitability.

== Relation to taxation ==
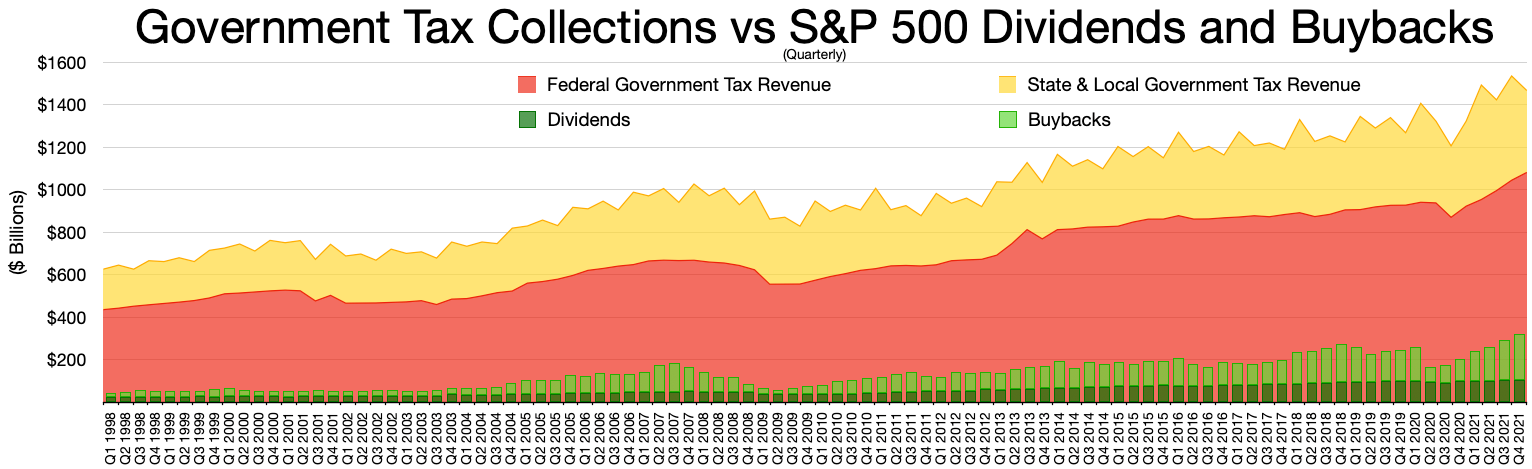
S&P 500 dividends and buybacks vs. Federal and State tax collections State tax revenue Federal tax revenue S&P 500 Stock buyback S&P 500 Dividends

In general, business leaders and investors are hostile to any attempts to encroach on total profit volume, especially those of government taxation. The lower taxes are, other things being equal, the bigger the mass of profit that can be distributed as income to private investors. It was tax revolts that originally were a powerful stimulus motivating the bourgeoisie to wrest state power from the feudal aristocracy at the beginning of the capitalist era.

In reality, of course, a substantial portion of tax money is also redistributed to private enterprise in the form of government contracts and subsidies. Capitalists may therefore be in conflict among themselves about taxes, since what is a cost to some is a source of profit to others. Marx never analysed all this in detail; but the concept of surplus value will apply mainly to taxes on gross income (personal and business income from production) and on the trade in products and services. Estate duty, for example, rarely contains a surplus value component, although profit could be earned in the transfer of the estate.

Generally, Marx seems to have regarded taxation imposts as a "form" which disguised real product values. Apparently following this view, Ernest Mandel in his 1960 treatise Marxist Economic Theory refers to (indirect) taxes as "arbitrary additions to commodity prices". But this is something of a misnomer, and disregards that taxes become part of the normal cost-structure of production. In his later treatise on late capitalism, Mandel, astonishingly, hardly mentions the significance of taxation at all, a very serious omission from the point of view of the real world of modern capitalism, since taxes can reach a magnitude of a third, or even half of GDP (see E. Mandel, Late Capitalism. London: Verso, 1975).For example, in the United Kingdom alone, 75% of all taxation revenue comes from just three taxes: Income tax, National insurance and VAT, which in reality is 75% of the GDP of the country.

== Relation to the circuits of capital ==
Generally, Marx focused in Das Kapital on the new surplus-value generated by production, and the distribution of this surplus value. In this way, he aimed to reveal the "origin of the wealth of nations" given a capitalist mode of production. However, in any real economy, a distinction must be drawn between the primary circuit of capital, and the secondary circuits. To some extent, national accounts also do this.

The primary circuit refers to the incomes and products generated and distributed from productive activity (reflected by GDP). The secondary circuits refer to trade, transfers and transactions occurring outside that sphere, which can also generate incomes, and these incomes may also involve the realisation of a surplus-value or profit.

It is true that Marx argues no net additions to value can be created through acts of exchange, economic value being an attribute of labour-products (previous or newly created) only. Nevertheless, trading activity outside the sphere of production can obviously also yield a surplus-value which represents a transfer of value from one person, country or institution to another.

A very simple example would be if somebody sold a second-hand asset at a profit. This transaction is not recorded in gross product measures (after all, it isn't new production), nevertheless a surplus-value is obtained from it. Another example would be capital gains from property sales. Marx occasionally refers to this kind of profit as profit upon alienation, alienation being used here in the juridical, not sociological sense. By implication, if we just focused on surplus-value newly created in production, we would underestimate total surplus-values realised as income in a country. This becomes obvious if we compare census estimates of income & expenditure with GDP data.

This is another reason why surplus-value produced and surplus-value realised are two different things, although this point is largely ignored in the economics literature. But it becomes highly important when the real growth of production stagnates, and a growing portion of capital shifts out of the sphere of production in search of surplus-value from other deals.

Nowadays the volume of world trade grows significantly faster than GDP, suggesting to Marxian economists such as Samir Amin that surplus-value realised from commercial trade (representing to a large extent a transfer of value by intermediaries between producers and consumers) grows faster than surplus-value realised directly from production.

Thus, if we took the final price of a good (the cost to the final consumer) and analysed the cost structure of that good, we might find that, over a period of time, the direct producers get less income and intermediaries between producers and consumers (traders) get more income from it. That is, control over the access to a good, asset or resource as such may increasingly become a very important factor in realising a surplus-value. In the worst case, this amounts to parasitism or extortion. This analysis illustrates a key feature of surplus value which is that it accumulated by the owners of capital only within inefficient markets because only inefficient markets – i.e. those in which transparency and competition are low – have profit margins large enough to facilitate capital accumulation. Ironically, profitable – meaning inefficient – markets have difficulty meeting the definition a free market because a free market is to some extent defined as an efficient one: one in which goods or services are exchanged without coercion or fraud, or in other words with competition (to prevent monopolistic coercion) and transparency (to prevent fraud).

== Measurement ==
The first attempt to measure the rate of surplus-value in money-units was by Marx himself in chapter 9 of Das Kapital, using factory data of a spinning mill supplied by Friedrich Engels (though Marx credits "a Manchester spinner"). Both in published and unpublished manuscripts, Marx examines variables affecting the rate and mass of surplus-value in detail.

Some Marxian economists argue that Marx thought the possibility of measuring surplus value depends on the publicly available data. We can develop statistical indicators of trends, without mistakenly conflating data with the real thing they represent, or postulating "perfect measurements or perfect data" in the empiricist manner.

Since early studies by Marxian economists like Eugen Varga, Charles Bettelheim, Joseph Gillmann, Edward Wolff and Shane Mage, there have been numerous attempts by Marxian economists to measure the trend in surplus-value statistically using national accounts data. The most convincing modern attempt is probably that of Anwar Shaikh and Ahmet Tonak.

Usually this type of research involves reworking the components of the official measures of gross output and capital outlays to approximate Marxian categories, in order to estimate empirically the trends in the ratios thought important in the Marxian explanation of capital accumulation and economic growth: the rate of surplus-value, the organic composition of capital, the rate of profit, the rate of increase in the capital stock, and the rate of reinvestment of realised surplus-value in production.

The Marxian mathematicians Emmanuel Farjoun and Moshé Machover argue that "even if the rate of surplus value has changed by 10–20% over a hundred years, the real problem [to explain] is why it has changed so little" (quoted from The Laws of Chaos: A Probabilistic Approach to Political Economy (1983), p. 192). The answer to that question must, in part, be sought in artefacts (statistical distortion effects) of data collection procedures. Mathematical extrapolations are ultimately based on the data available, but that data itself may be fragmentary and not the "complete picture".

== Different conceptions ==
In neo-Marxist thought, Paul A. Baran for example substitutes the concept of "economic surplus" for Marx's surplus value. In a joint work, Paul Baran and Paul Sweezy define the economic surplus as "the difference between what a society produces and the costs of producing it" (Monopoly Capitalism, New York 1966, p. 9). Much depends here on how the costs are valued, and which costs are taken into account. Piero Sraffa also refers to a "physical surplus" with a similar meaning, calculated according to the relationship between prices of physical inputs and outputs.

In these theories, surplus product and surplus value are equated, while value and price are identical, but the distribution of the surplus tends to be separated theoretically from its production; whereas Marx insists that the distribution of wealth is governed by the social conditions in which it is produced, especially by property relations giving entitlement to products, incomes and assets (see also relations of production).

In Kapital Vol. 3, Marx insists strongly that:

...the specific economic form, in which unpaid surplus labour is pumped out of direct producers, determines the relationship of rulers and ruled, as it grows directly out of production itself and, in turn, reacts upon it as a determining element. Upon this, however, is founded the entire formation of the economic community which grows up out of the production relations themselves, thereby simultaneously its specific political form. It is always the direct relationship of the owners of the conditions of production to the direct producers – a relation always naturally corresponding to a definite stage of the methods of labour and thereby its social productivity – which reveals the innermost secret, the hidden basis of the entire social structure, and with it the political form of the relation of sovereignty and dependence, in short, the corresponding specific form of the state. This does not prevent the same economic basis – the same from the standpoint of its main conditions – due to innumerable different, empirical circumstances, natural environment, racial relations, external historical influence, etc. from showing infinite variations and gradations in appearance, which can be ascertained only by analysis of the empirically given circumstances.

This is a substantive – if abstract – thesis about the basic social relations involved in giving and getting, taking and receiving in human society, and their consequences for the way work and wealth is shared out. It suggests a starting point for an inquiry into the problem of social order and social change. But obviously it is only a starting point, not the whole story, which would include all the "variations and gradations".

== Morality and power ==
A textbook-type example of an alternative interpretation to Marx's is provided by Lester Thurow. He argues: "In a capitalistic society, profits – and losses – hold center stage." But what, he asks, explains profits?

There are five reasons for profit, according to Thurow:

- Capitalists are willing to delay their own personal gratification, and profit is their reward.
- Some profits are a return to those who take risks.
- Some profits are a return to organisational ability, enterprise, and entrepreneurial energy
- Some profits are economic rents – a firm that has a monopoly in producing some product or service can set a price higher than would be set in a competitive market and, thus, earn higher than normal returns.
- Some profits are due to market imperfections – they arise when goods are traded above their competitive equilibrium price.

The problem here is that Thurow doesn't really provide an objective explanation of profits so much as a moral justification for profits, i.e. as a legitimate entitlement or claim, in return for the supply of capital.

He adds that "Attempts have been made to organize productive societies without the profit motive (...) [but] since the industrial revolution... there have been essentially no successful economies that have not taken advantage of the profit motive." The problem here is again a moral judgement, dependent on what you mean by success. Some societies using the profit motive were ruined; profit is no guarantee of success, although you can say that it has powerfully stimulated economic growth.

Thurow goes on to note that "When it comes to actually measuring profits, some difficult accounting issues arise." Why? Because after deduction of costs from gross income, "It is hard to say exactly how much must be reinvested to maintain the size of the capital stock". Ultimately, Thurow implies, the tax department is the arbiter of the profit volume, because it determines depreciation allowances and other costs which capitalists may annually deduct in calculating taxable gross income.

This is obviously a theory very different from Marx's. In Thurow's theory, the aim of business is to maintain the capital stock. In Marx's theory, competition, desire and market fluctuations create the striving and pressure to increase the capital stock; the whole aim of capitalist production is capital accumulation, i.e. business growth maximising net income. Marx argues there is no evidence that the profit accruing to capitalist owners is quantitatively connected to the "productive contribution" of the capital they own. In practice, within the capitalist firm, no standard procedure exists for measuring such a "productive contribution" and for distributing the residual income accordingly.

In Thurow's theory, profit is mainly just "something that happens" when costs are deducted from sales, or else a justly deserved income. For Marx, increasing profits is, at least in the longer term, the "bottom line" of business behaviour: the quest for obtaining extra surplus-value, and the incomes obtained from it, are what guides capitalist development (in modern language, "creating maximum shareholder value").

That quest, Marx notes, always involves a power relationship between different social classes and nations, inasmuch as attempts are made to force other people to pay for costs as much as possible, while maximising one's own entitlement or claims to income from economic activity. The clash of economic interests that invariably results, implies that the battle for surplus value will always involve an irreducible moral dimension; the whole process rests on a complex system of negotiation, dealing and bargaining. in which reasons for claims to wealth are asserted, usually within a legal framework and sometimes through wars. Underneath it all, Marx argues, was an exploitative relationship.

That was the main reason why, Marx argues, the real sources of surplus-value were shrouded or obscured by ideology, and why Marx thought that political economy merited a critique. Quite simply, economics proved unable to theorise capitalism as a social system, at least not without moral biases intruding in the very definition of its conceptual distinctions. Hence, even the most simple economic concepts were often riddled with contradictions. But market trade could function well, even if the theory of markets was false; all that was required was an agreed and legally enforceable accounting system. On this point, Marx probably would have agreed with Austrian School economics – no knowledge of "markets in general" is required to participate in markets.

== See also ==
- Analytical Marxism
- Capital, Volume I
- Commodity fetishism
- Compensation of employees
- Cost of capital
- Labor theory of value
- Law of value
- Primitive accumulation of capital
- Rate of exploitation
- Return on capital
- Superprofit
- Surplus economics
- Theories of Surplus Value
