= Josef Löwy =

Austrian painter and photographer (1834–1902)

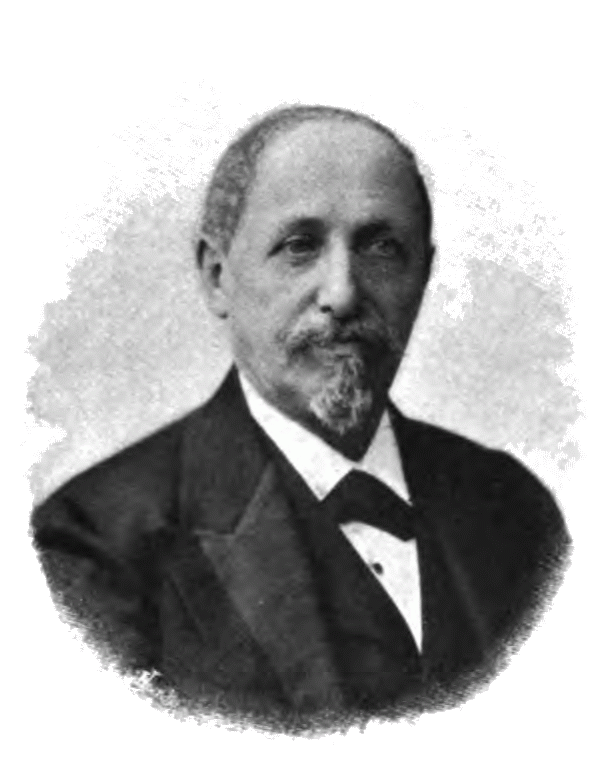
Josef Löwy

Josef Löwy (16 August 1834, in Pressburg – 24 March 1902, in Vienna) was an Austrian painter, publisher, industrialist and Imperial and Royal court photographer.

== Life ==
In 1848, Löwy moved to Vienna, where he learned lithography. He then studied painting at the Academy of Fine Arts Vienna. He opened his first studio in Vienna in 1856. In 1859, he moved to a new studio. One of his premises was related in the Weihburggasse 31, 1 District. In 1861, he joined the Photographischen Gesellschaft in Vienna and in 1864, he participated in the first photographic exhibition in Vienna. Between 1866 and 1873, he had a summer studio in Baden bei Wien. Since 1872, he worked on the Collagraphy processes and he founded a studio for industrial shots in the Landstraße district.

In 1873, Löwy joined the Viennese Photographers Association which was founded for the 1873 World Fair in Vienna. This had the license for the production of photographs in the exhibition grounds. In the same year and in part as a result of his participation in the world fair he became court photographer to Emperor Franz Joseph.

Among other things, Löwy became known for his industrial photographs, starting from the 1880s, made using heliography. In 1885, he founded a dry plate production business with the amateur photographer Josef Plener. He also became internationally known for his photographic reproductions business. The main subjects of his photography were portraits, Viennese architecture, art and nude photography. His company was continued by his widow Mathilde Löwy and then in 1908 by nephew Gustav Löwy under the name "Kunstanstalt J. Löwy".

== Works ==
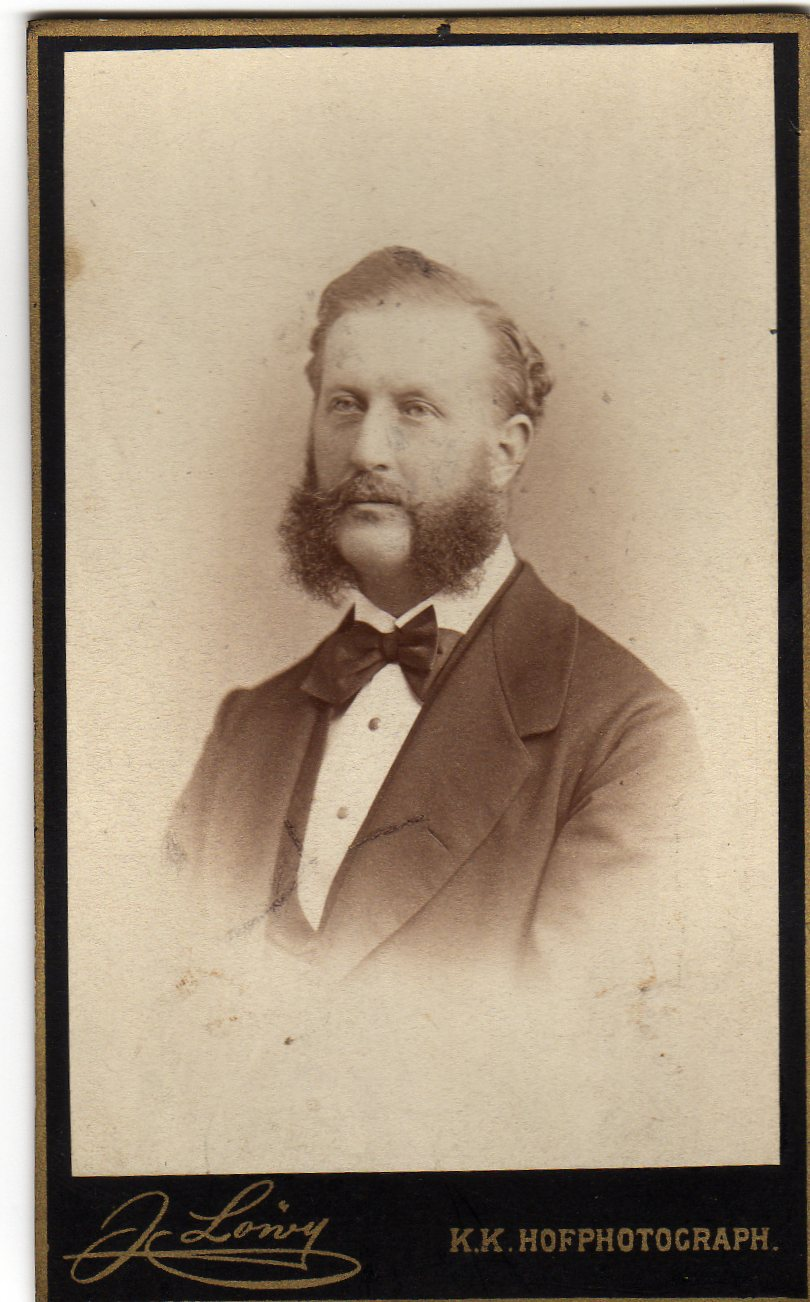
Anton August Graf von Attems-Gilleis, Freiherr von Heiligenkreuz (1834–1891)

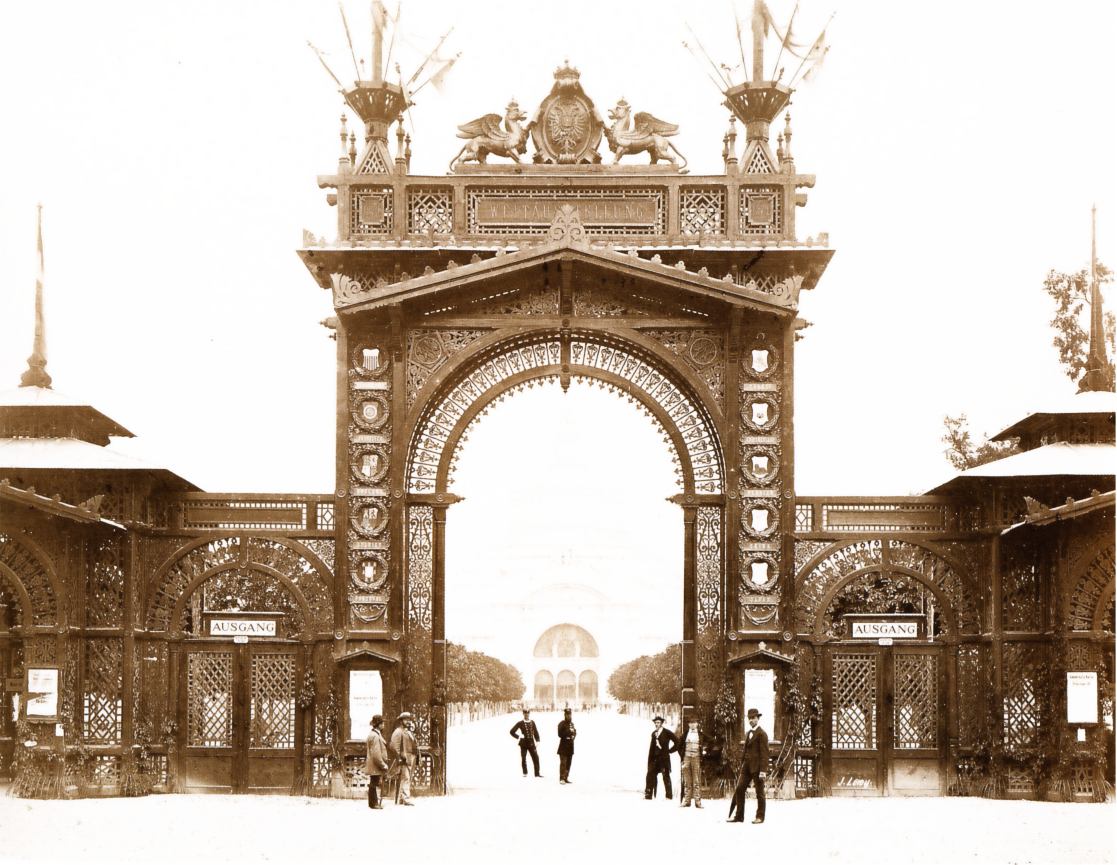
World Fair, Vienna 1873

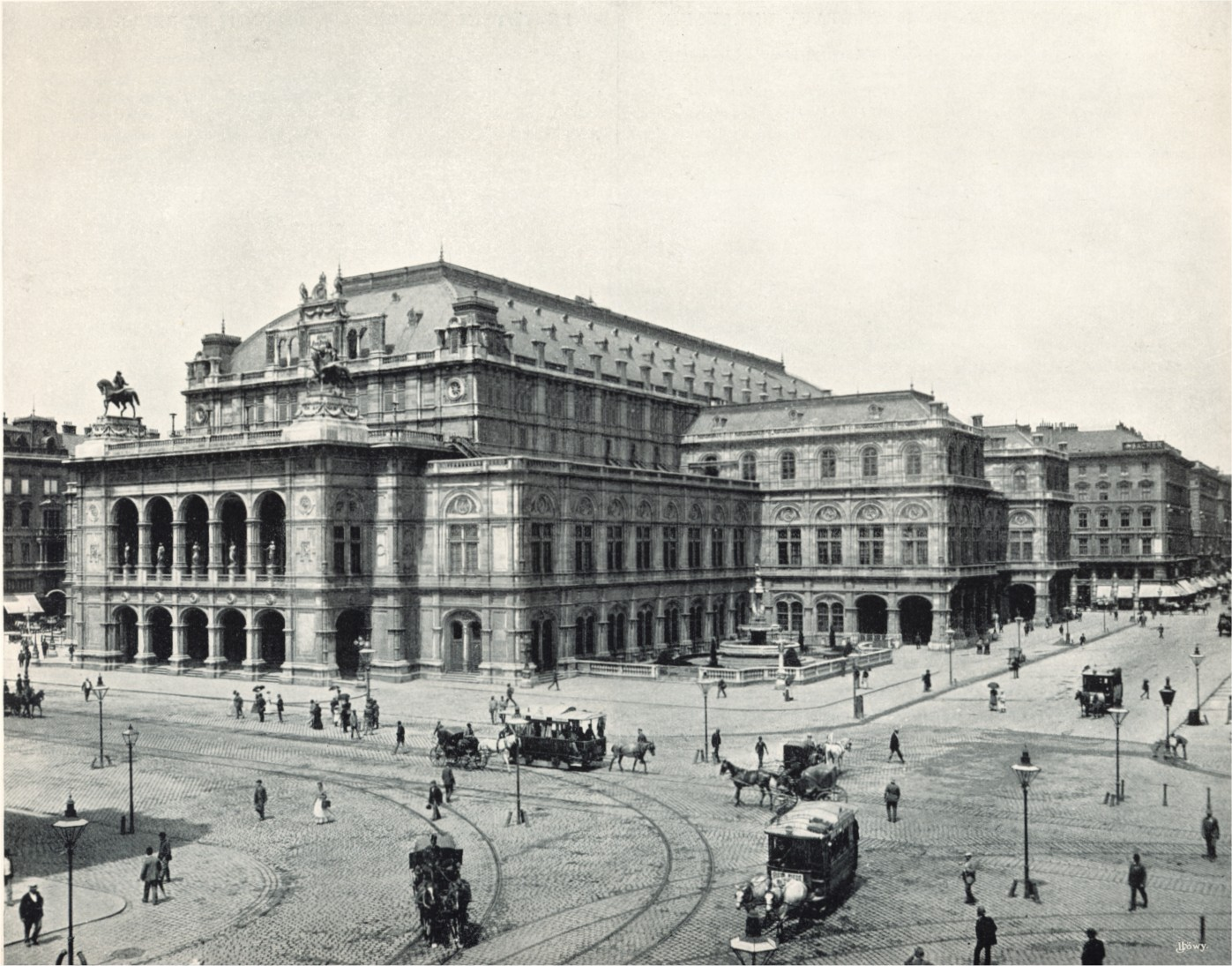
Vienna Opera House circa. 1898

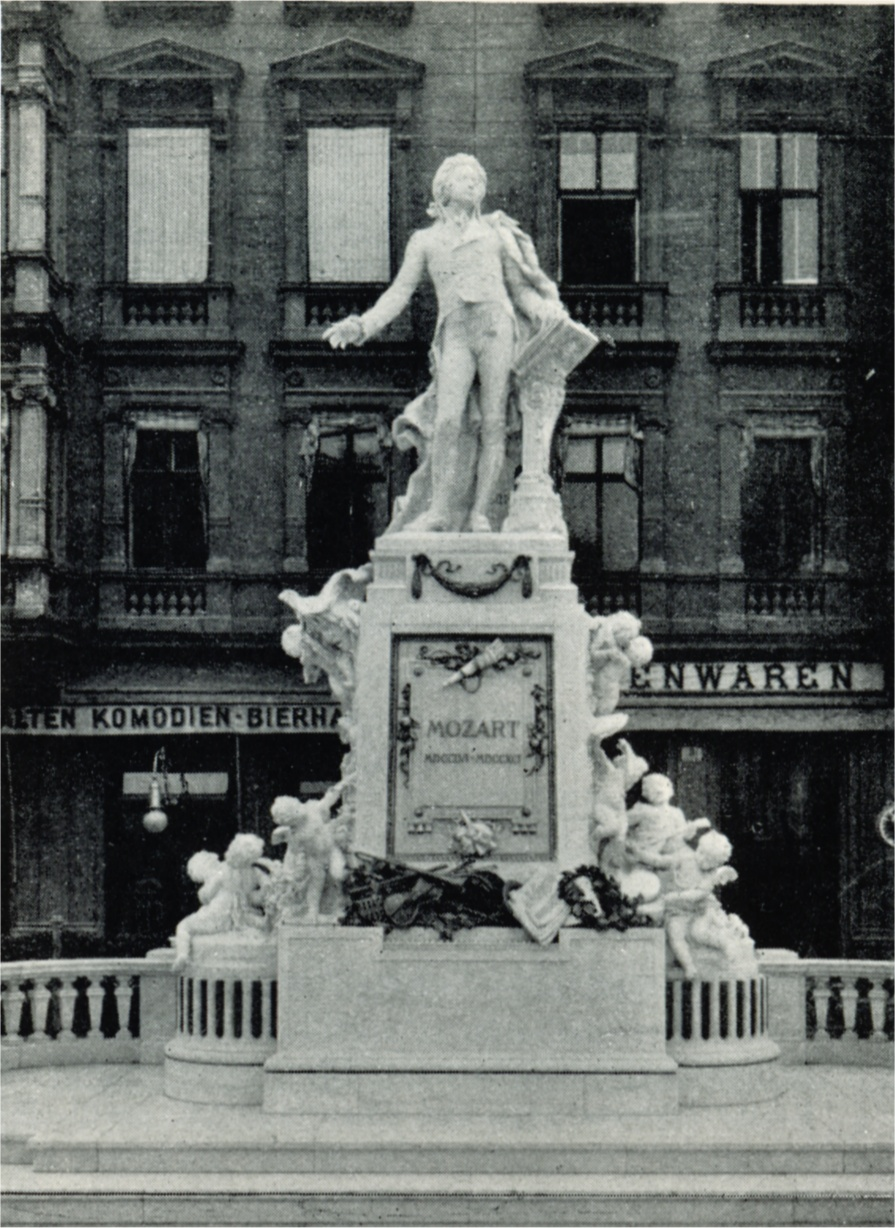
Mozart statue by Viktor Tilgner, between 1896 und 1898

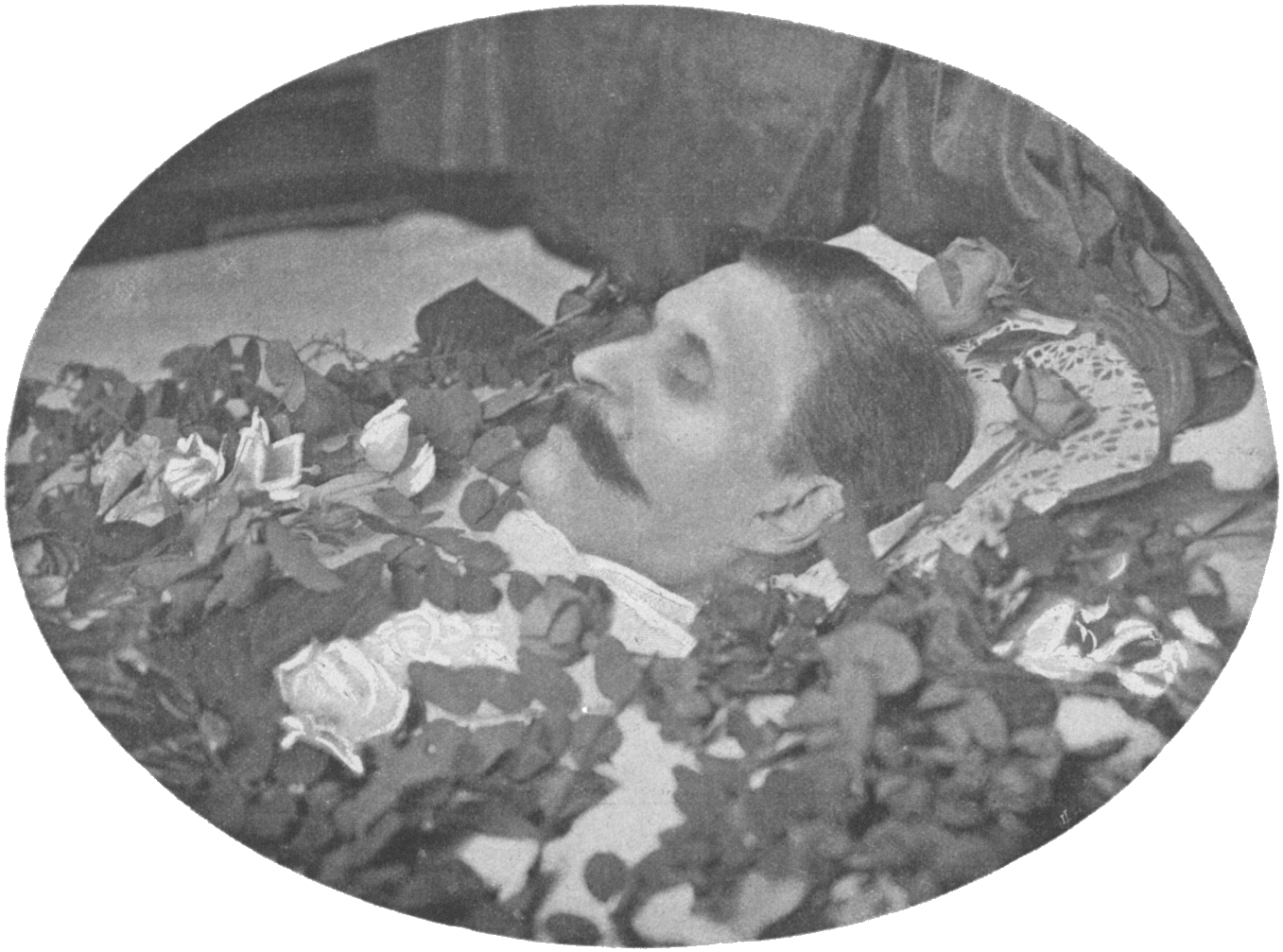
Johann Strauss II 1899, in: Österreichische Illustrierte Zeitung, 11. Juni 1899

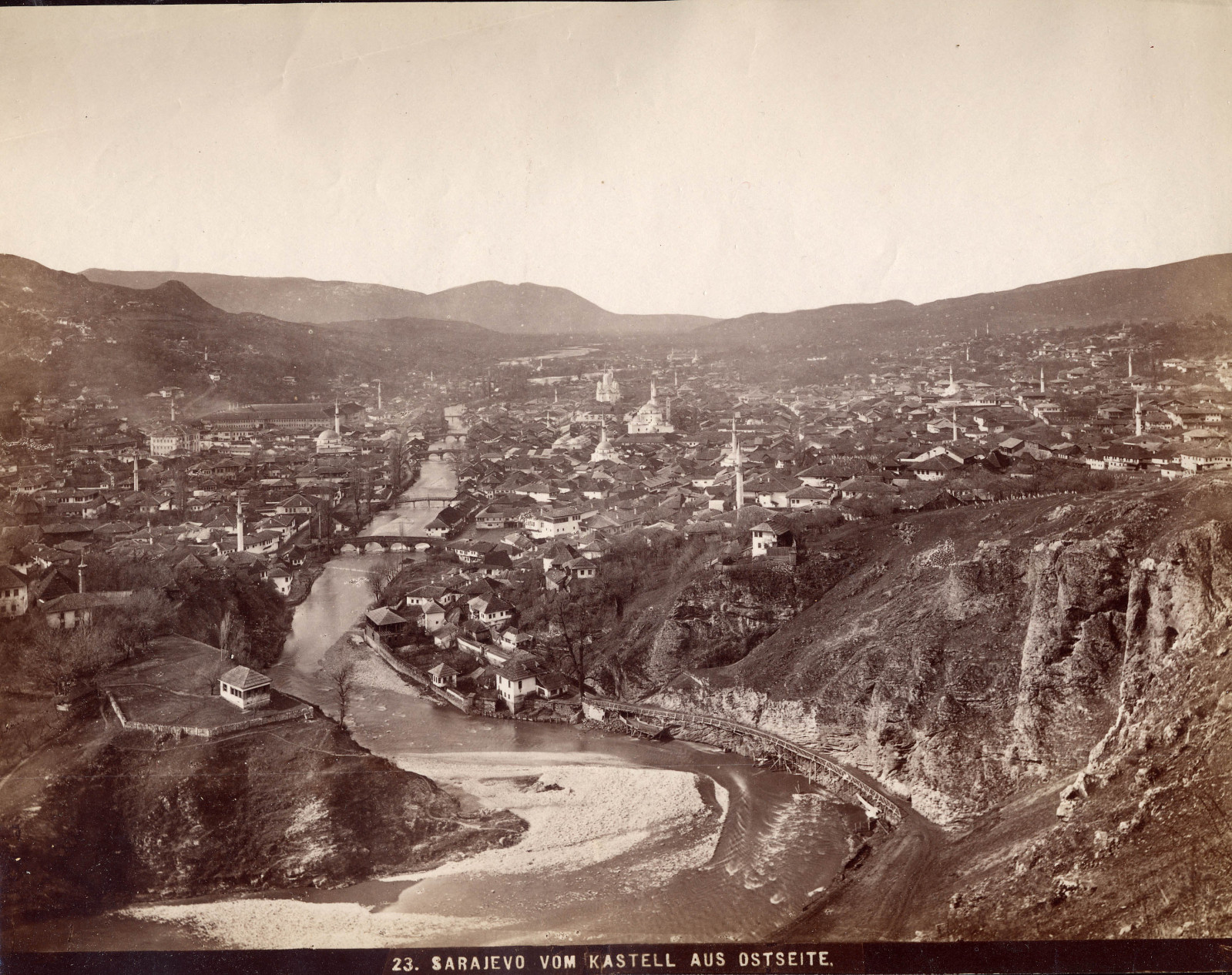
Panorama of Sarajevo in 1878

Löwy published a variety of books:

- J.Löwy in the Österreichischen Nationalbibliothek
- Josef Löwy in the Österreichischen Nationalbibliothek

== Awards ==
- 1873 – Title of Court Photographer (Hofphotograph) (by Emperor Franz Joseph I of Austria)

== Literature ==
- Durstmüller: "Löwy Josef". In: Österreichisches Biographisches Lexikon 1815–1950 (ÖBL). Vol. 5, Austrian Academy of Sciences, Vienna 1972, p. 296 f. (Direct links to "p. 296", "p. 297")
- Welt ausstellen. Herausgeber Technisches Museum Wien, S. 110–111, Beiträge von: Ulrike Felber, Manuela Fellner-Feldhaus und Elke Krasny dt. /engl., ISBN 3-902183-10-1
