= Time-use survey =

Statistical survey

A time-use survey is a statistical survey which aims to report data on how, on average, people spend their time.

== Objectives ==
The objective of the Time-Use survey is to identify, classify and quantify the main types of activity that people engage in during a definitive time period, e.g. a year, a month, etc. Many surveys are used for calculation of unpaid work done by women as well as men in particular locality.

== See also ==
- American Time Use Survey
- Productive and unproductive labour
- Value added
- Metropolitan Travel Survey Archive
- Time poverty
