= Theories of Surplus Value =

Literary work by Karl Marx

1969 Progress Publishers edition

Theories of Surplus Value (German: Theorien über den Mehrwert) is a draft manuscript written by Karl Marx between January 1862 and July 1863. It is mainly concerned with the Western European theorizing about what he described as the Mehrwert (added value or surplus value) from about 1750, critically examining the ideas of British, French and German political economists about wealth creation and the profitability of industries. At issue are the source, forms and determinants of the magnitude of surplus-value and Marx tries to explain how, in his view after failing to solve basic contradictions in its labour theories of value, what he terms the 'classical school of bourgeois political economy' eventually broke up, leaving only "vulgar political economy" which no longer tried to provide a consistent, integral theory of capitalism, but instead offered only an eclectic amalgam of theories which seemed pragmatically useful or which justified the rationality of the market economy.

== Background ==
Theories of Surplus Value was part of the large Economic Manuscripts of 1861–1863, entitled by Marx A Contribution to the Critique of Political Economy and written as the immediate sequel to the first part of A Contribution to the Critique of Political Economy published in 1859. The total 1861–1863 manuscript consists of 23 notebooks (the pages numbered consecutively from 1 to 1472) running to some 200 printed sheets in length. Theories of Surplus Value forms the longest (about 110 printed sheets) and most fully elaborated part of this huge manuscript, and it is the first and only draft of the fourth, concluding volume of Das Kapital. As distinguished from the three theoretical volumes of Das Kapital, Marx called this volume the historical, historico-critical, or historico-literary part of his work.

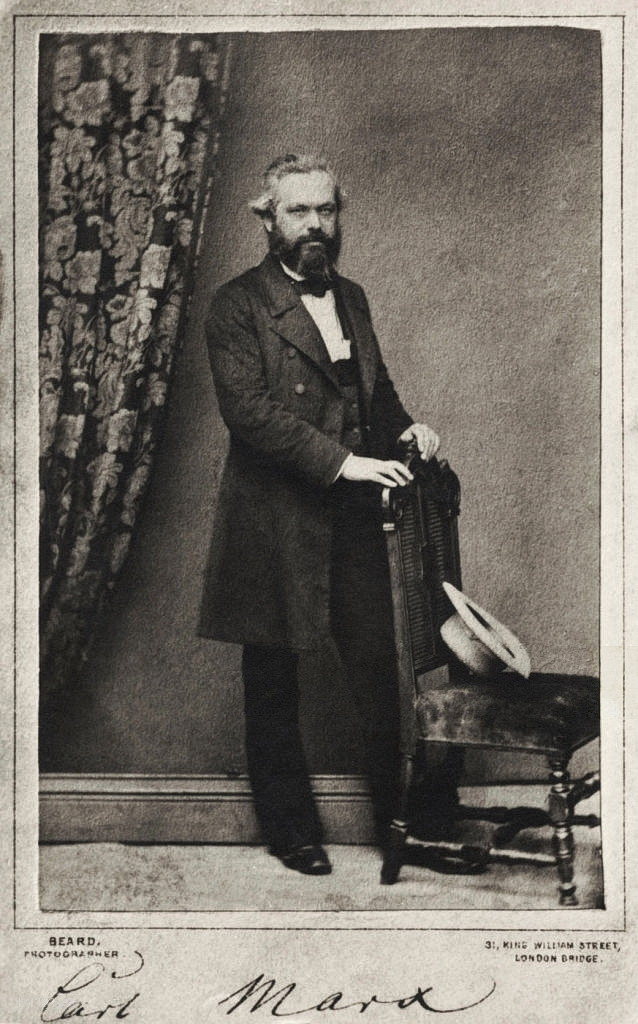
Karl Marx as he appeared in the 1860s

Marx began to write Theories of Surplus Value within the framework of the original plan of his Critique of Political Economy as he had projected in 1858–1862. On the basis of what Marx says about the structure of his work in his introduction to the first part of A Contribution to the Critique of Political Economy, in his letters of 1858–1862 and in the 1861–1863 manuscript itself, this plan titled Plan for the Critique of Political Economy can be presented in the following schematic form as projected by Marx in 1858–1862:

1. Capital:
  1. Introduction: Commodity and Money
  2. Capital in general:
    1. The production process of capital:
      1. Transformation of money into capital
      2. Absolute surplus-value
      3. Relative surplus-value
      4. The combination of both
      5. Theories of surplus-value
    2. The circulation process of capital
    3. The unity of the two, or capital and profit
  3. The competition of capitals
  4. Credit
  5. Share capital
2. Landed property
3. Wage-labour
4. The state
5. Foreign trade
6. The world-market

Theories of Surplus Value was originally conceived by Marx as an excursion in the history of economic thought, placed in the section of his theoretical study of "capital in general". It was intended as a conclusion to the section on the production process of capital. This plan however proved to be more than Marx could carry out in his lifetime. When Theories of Surplus Value was finally published in German by Karl Kautsky in 1905-1910, this by no means meant that all of Marx's writing on political economy were now available to the public. This task was mostly completed decades later, in the 1970s, 1980s and 1990s, with the publication of the Grundrisse (1857-58), the Results of the Immediate Production Process (1864) and various other manuscripts included in the German MEGA2 edition and in English translations.

== Publication history ==
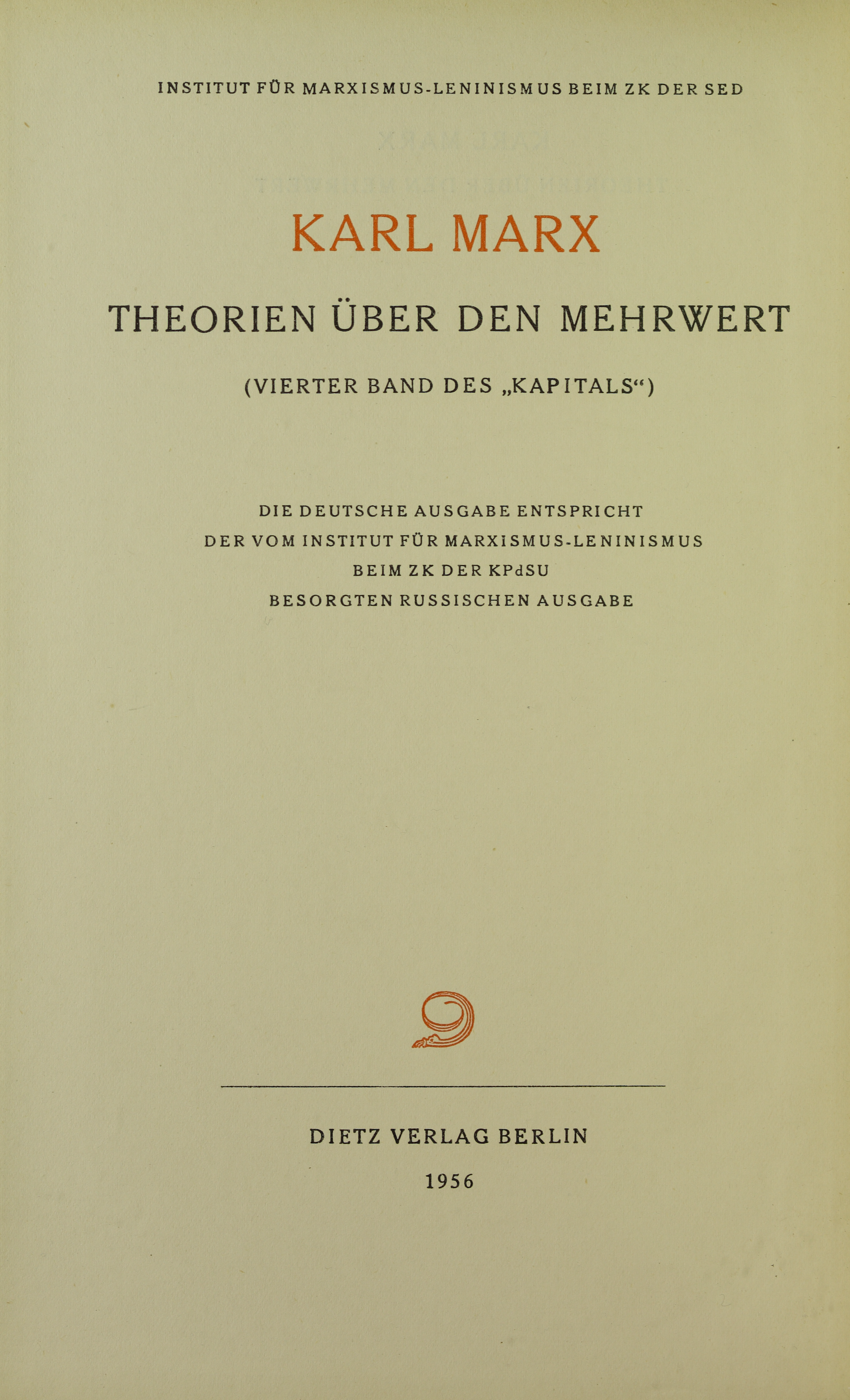
Theorien über den Mehrwert, 1956

In his preface (dated 5 May 1885) to his edition of Volume II of Das Kapital and in several letters during the following ten years, Friedrich Engels indicated his intention to publish the manuscript of Theories of Surplus Value, which was to form Volume IV. However, although he succeeded in publishing the second and third volume of Das Kapital, Engels was unable to publish the Theories before he died in 1895.

In 1923, David Riazanov (Ryazanov) of the Marx–Engels Institute in Moscow (the predecessor of the Marx–Engels–Lenin Institute) purchased many of Marx's original manuscripts and many other 19th century socialist archives with generous finance from the Soviet government, including the Theories of Surplus Value notebooks. From that point on, the access to, the editing and the publication of the text was under the control of the Russian and East German communist authorities. After 1991, the manuscript was transferred to the Russian Center for Preservation and Study of Records of Modern History (RTsKhIDNI) and since the late 1990s it is stored with the centralized Russian State Archive of Socio-Political History (Rossiiskii gosudarstvennyi arkhiv sotsial'no-politicheskoi istorii [RGASPI]) in Moscow.

=== German edition ===
In 1905–1910, Karl Kautsky published a first edited version of Marx’s manuscript in three volumes (1,754 pages; the second volume consists of two separate parts), with Dietz publishers in Stuttgart. However, Kautsky rearranged the original sequence of topics discussed in the notebooks and deleted or modified some text. For this reason, his edition is not regarded as a fully accurate rendering of Marx's thought (although it sheds light on how Kautsky understood Marx). Kautsky’s first volume of Marx’s notes dealt with the theories of surplus value up to Adam Smith, the second volume with David Ricardo (in two parts) and the final one with the breakup of the Ricardian school and "vulgar economics". This edition is out of print and rare.

A complete, annotated three-volume edition was first published in German (1956, 1959, 1962) by the Institute of Marxism–Leninism of the Socialist Unity Party in East Germany. The text was subsequently included in the Marx Engels Werke published by Dietz in Volumes 26.1 (1965), 26.2 (1967) and 26.3 (1968). Like the Kautsky edition which it imitates to an extent, the East German edition rearranged the original text under various topic headings. This version is regarded as more accurate and complete than Kautsky's, but it still lacks the sequence of the original manuscripts and is not a completely literal translation. It is now out of print.

=== Russian edition ===
A Russian edition was first published in Moscow as Marx-Engels, Collected Works, Volumes 26.1 (1962), 26.2 (1963) and 26.3 (1964).

=== English edition ===
In 1951, G. A. Bonner and E. Burns published an English translation of excerpts from the German volumes published by Kautsky, with Lawrence & Wishart in London and International Publishers in New York. It is out of print.

A complete English translation by Terence McCarthy of the French edition of Kautsky's first volume was published by Langland Press (New York, 1952) under the title A History of Economic Theories: From the Physiocrats to Adam Smith, but translations of the subsequent volumes never appeared. It is out of print and rare. However, Literary Licensing LLC made available print-on-demand copies since 2011.

Progress Publishers in Moscow together with the London publisher Lawrence & Wishart published an annotated English edition of the whole manuscript based on the East German one. It came out in three volumes (1963, 1968, 1971), edited by S. Ryazanskaya, translated by Renate Simpson and others. This English version, just like the East German and Russian ones, rearranges the sequence of material in the original manuscripts under various new headings (often rendered in square brackets). This edition was also published in various other languages by Progress Publishers and others. It is now out of print.

The whole text appeared again also in the English Marx/Engels Collected Works, Volumes 30 (1988), 31 (1989), 32 (1989), 33 (1991) and 34 (1994). This English version is based on the 1977–1979 German MEGA II edition. It maintains the sequence of the text in the original manuscripts and therefore differs substantially from the 1963 Progress edition and earlier editions. This MECW version is the most complete edition available in English. Although it went out of print, Lawrence & Wishart and International Publishers still sell many volumes in the series (digital editions are sometimes made available online). The Progress Publishers and Lawrence & Wishart English edition was brought back into print by Prometheus Books in 2000 as a one 1,605 page volume. This edition is now also out of print. In 2013, Pine Flag Books (Boston) published a Kindle digital version of the three-volume Progress Publishers English edition edited by Gene Ogorodov.

=== French edition ===
A full translation of Kautsky's German edition into French was made by Jules Molitor and published in 1924–1925 by A. Costes.

In 1980, a French edition of the 1861–1863 notebooks I to V was published by Jean-Pierre Lefebvre in association with Gilbert Badia, Étienne Balibar, Jean-François Cailleux and Michel Espagne.

=== Japanese edition ===
The first Japanese translation of Theories of Surplus Value appears to have been made in the 1920s. Another was made in the 1930s by Zenya Takashima (1904–1990), who taught at Tokyo University of Commerce/Hitotsubashi University, but the manuscript of this translation was seized when he was arrested and it was lost.

=== Spanish edition ===
A Spanish translation was made by Wenceslao Roces and published in Mexico City in 1945 under the title Historia crítica de la teoría de la plusvalía. New Spanish editions were published in 1974 (Madrid: Alberto Corazon), 1977 (Barcelona: Crítica, prepared by Manuel Sacristán Luzón), 1978 (Havana: La Habana Editorial de Ciencias Sociales, translated by Mario Díaz Godoy), 1980 (México: Fondo de Cultura Económica) and 1998–2000 (San Diego: Fondo de Cultura Economica USA).

=== Chinese edition ===
In 1949, Shanghai Dushu and Shenghuo Publishing House published a Chinese translation of Theories of Surplus Value by Guo Dali (Kuo Ta-li).

=== Italian edition ===
An Italian edition of Kautsky's version was published in 1954–1958, titled Storia delle teori economiche. The translator was E. Conti and the English professor Maurice Dobb wrote an introduction. There was a reprint in 1971. In 1974, a new Italian translation was published by Newton Compton Editori in Rome. It was translated by Lida Locatelli and introduced by Lucio Colletti.
