= United Kingdom National Accounts – The Blue Book =

The annual United Kingdom National Accounts (The Blue Book) records and describes economic activity in the United Kingdom and as such is used by government, banks, academics and industries to formulate the economic and social policies and monitor the economic progress of the United Kingdom. It also allows international comparisons to be made. The Blue Book is published by the UK Office for National Statistics alongside the United Kingdom Balance of Payments – The Pink Book.

United Kingdom National Accounts – The Blue Book 2009 edition

== History ==
After the Second World War the UK government recognised the importance of understanding what kind of state the economy was in. From this developed the 'National Income and Expenditure in the United Kingdom', first published in 1946 and covering the periods between 1938 and 1945. This was a very low-level look at the economy, including data such as the national cost of war, national income, expenditure on goods and services and taxes. By 1948 it had expanded to cover the national wage bill, private income and gross national product.

In 1952 the publication expanded from around 25 pages to 80 pages, incorporating new economic concepts and better sources. This began to resemble the Blue Book format that we know now. This included gross domestic product (GDP) and gross national product by sector, company profits, personal expenditure and savings.

This continued to develop until 1984 when it was renamed 'UK National Accounts – The Blue Book', and expanded to around 140 pages. Over time this has generally come to be known as 'The Blue Book', and in 2013, covered over 350 pages.

Blue Book 2013 was the first year that the Blue Book was produced as a web-based HTML publication, methodological improvements were applied and a significant level of work was completed to align the National Accounts and key publications, such as Public Sector Finances.

== The main parts of the Blue Book ==
=== Main aggregates and summary accounts ===
Chapter 1 provides a summary of the UK National Accounts along with explanations and tables that cover the main national and domestic aggregates, for example gross domestic product (GDP) at current market prices and chained volume measures; the GDP deflator; gross value added (GVA) at basic prices; gross final expenditure at current prices; GDP per head and; GDP and real household disposable income.

=== The industrial analyses ===
Chapter 2 includes input-output supply and use tables and analyses of gross value added at current market prices and chained volume measures, capital formation and employment, by industry. These describe the relationship among the various producers in the economy and how products move between each sector in the economy. This section analyses GVA, gross fixed capital formation and employment by the ten broad industry groups;

I. Agriculture
II. Production
III. Construction
IV. Distribution, Transport and Hotels
V. Information and Communication
VI. Financial & Insurance
VII. Real Estate
VIII. Professional and Support Activities
IX. Government, Health and Education
X. Other Services

=== The sector accounts ===
Chapters 3 (Non-financial corporations), 4 (Financial Corporations), 5 (General Government), 6 (Households and Non-profit Institutions Serving Households (NPISH)) and 7 (Rest of World) cover the sector accounts. The sector accounts summarise the transactions of particular groups of institutions within the economy, showing how the income from production is distributed and redistributed and how savings are used to add wealth through investment in physical or financial assets.

==== Institutional sectors ====
The accounting framework identifies two kinds of institutions:

- Consuming units (mainly households)
- Production units (mainly corporations, non-profit institutions or government)

Units can own goods and assets, incur liabilities and engage in economic activities and transactions with other units. All units are classified into one of five sectors: non-financial corporations, financial corporations, general government (central government and local government), households and non-profit institutions serving households (NPISH) and the rest of the world.

==== Types of transactions ====
There are three main types of transactions:

- Transactions in products are related to goods and services. They include output, intermediate consumption, final consumption, gross capital formation and exports and imports.
- Distributive transactions transfer income or wealth between units of the economy. They include property income, taxes and subsidies, social contributions and benefits and other current or capital transfers.
- Financial transactions differ from distributive transactions in that they relate to transactions in financial claims, whereas distributive transactions are unrequited. The main categories in the classification of financial instruments are monetary gold and special drawing rights; currency and deposits; securities other than shares; loans; shares and other equity; insurance and pension funds reserves; and other accounts receivable/payable.

==== Sequence of accounts ====
Transactions can be grouped broadly according to purpose in the following accounts; the production account displays the transactions involved in the generation of income by the production of goods and services. For each of the four sectors (the rest of the world does not have a production account), the balancing item, gross value added, is shown as output less intermediate consumption. Gross value added at basic prices for each sector differs from gross domestic product for the UK total economy. The difference occurs because taxes less subsidies on products are not included in the production account by sector and are instead included within resources for the UK total economy. The sum of gross value added and taxes less subsidies on products for the UK economy is equal to GDP at market prices. The distribution and use of income accounts exist for all the institutional sectors. These accounts describe the distribution and redistribution of income and its use in the form of final consumption. The distribution and use of income are analysed in four stages, each of which is presented as a separate account.

1. Generation of income account – This is the first of the distribution and use of income accounts and shows the sectors and industries which are the source of income. The generation of income account details how value added is distributed in the form of labour costs (compensation of employees) and taxes minus subsidies on production. The balance is gross operating surplus (plus mixed income in the household sector), which is the surplus or deficit on production activities before interest, rent and income taxes. Gross operating surplus is therefore the income which units obtain from their own use of the production facilities.
2. Allocation of primary income account – This account shows the resident units and institutional sectors as recipients rather than producers of primary income. It demonstrates the extent to which operating surpluses are distributed (for example by dividends) to the owners of the enterprises. Also recorded in this account is the property income received by an owner of a financial asset in return for providing funds to, or putting a tangible non-produced asset at the disposal of, another unit. The receipt by government of taxes on production less subsidies is shown in resources.
  The resources side of this account includes the components of the income approach to measuring gross domestic product and is the starting point for the quarterly sector accounts. The accounts also include property income recorded as both resources for receipts and uses for payments.
  The balance of this account is the gross balance of primary income for each sector. If the gross balance of primary income is aggregated across all sectors of the UK economy, the result is gross national income.
3. Secondary distribution of income account – This account describes how the balance of primary income for each institutional sector is allocated by redistribution; through transfers such as taxes on income, social contributions and benefits and other current transfers. It excludes social transfers in kind.
  The balancing item of this account is gross disposable income which reflects current transactions and explicitly excludes capital transfers, real holding gains and losses and the consequences of events such as natural disasters.
4. Use of disposable income account – This account illustrates how disposable income is split between final consumption expenditure and saving. In the system for recording economic accounts, only the government and households and NPISH sectors have final consumption. In addition, for households and pension funds, there is an adjustment item in the account which reflects the way that transactions between households and pension funds are recorded.
  The balancing item for this account and for the whole group of distribution and use of income accounts is gross saving. It is only in the case of non-financial corporations (public and private) that undistributed income and saving are equivalent.

==== The capital account ====
The capital account is presented in two parts.

- The first part shows that saving, the balance between national disposable income and final consumption expenditure from the production and distribution and use of income accounts, is reduced or increased by the balance of capital transfers to provide an amount available for financing investment (in both non-financial and financial assets).
- The second part shows total investment in non-financial assets. This is the sum of gross fixed capital formation, changes in inventories, acquisitions less disposals of valuables and acquisitions less disposals of non-financial non-produced assets. The balance on the capital account is known as net lending or borrowing. Conceptually, net lending or borrowing for all the domestic sectors represents net lending or borrowing to the rest of the world sector.

If actual investment is lower than the amount available for investment, the balance will be positive – representing net lending. Similarly, when the balance is negative, borrowing is represented. Where the capital accounts relate to the individual institutional sectors, the net lending/borrowing of a particular sector represents the amounts available for lending or borrowing to other sectors. The value of net lending/borrowing is the same irrespective of whether the accounts are shown before or after deduction of fixed capital consumption, provided a consistent approach is adopted throughout.

==== The financial account ====
The financial account shows the acquisition and disposal of financial assets and liabilities. Examples of financial assets include: bank deposits (which are assets of the depositors and liabilities of the banks), unit trust units (assets of the holders and liabilities of unit trusts), and Treasury Bills (assets of the holders and a liability of central government). The balance of all transactions in the financial account is net lending or borrowing.

==== The statistical adjustment items ====
Although in theory the net lending/borrowing from the financial account and the net lending/borrowing from the capital account for each sector should be equal, in practice they are not. The difference between the two balances is known as the statistical adjustment item. Part of the balancing process of economic accounts statistics for the previous year (that is, for years t–1 and earlier) involves assessing and modifying the component variables so that the estimates of net lending/borrowing made from the income and capital accounts and from the financial accounts are the same at the level of the whole economy and reasonably close to each other at the sector level.

==== Balance sheets ====
A financial balance sheet for each sector is compiled using the same financial instrument classification as that used for financial transactions. The changes in the end period levels in the financial balance sheets do not equal the financial transactions because of holding gains or losses and reclassifications of units between sectors.

=== Other analyses and derived statistics ===
This includes chapters 8 (Percentage Distributions and Growth Rates), 9 (Fixed Capital Formation Supplementary Tables), 10 (National Balance Sheet), 11 (Public Sector Supplementary Tables) and 12 (Statistics for European Union Purposes). These cover other additional analyses. It includes tables showing the percentage growth rates of the main aggregates and supplementary tables for capital consumption, gross fixed capital formation, capital stock, non-financial balance sheets, public sector data, and GNI consistent with the European System of Accounts (ESA95) compiled for EU budgetary purposes.

=== UK Environmental Accounts ===
This includes chapter 13; Environmental Accounts. Environmental Accounts are "satellite accounts" to the main National Accounts. Satellite accounts are extensions to National Accounts, which facilitate analysis of the wider impact of economic change. They are compiled in accordance with the System of Integrated Environmental and Economic Accounting (SEEA), which closely follows the UN System of National Accounts (SNA).

Environmental Accounts measure the impacts of the economy on the environment (e.g. pollution) and how the environment contributes to the economy (e.g. use of raw materials, resource efficiency, etc.) by using the accounting framework and concepts of the national accounts. UK Environmental Accounts are used to inform sustainable development policy, to model impacts of fiscal or monetary measures and to evaluate the environmental impacts of different sectors of the economy. Most data are provided in units of physical measurement (mass or volume), although some are in monetary units, where this is the most relevant or the only data available.

The government pledged to develop full UK Environmental Accounts by 2020. In December 2012, the Office for National Statistics (ONS) in partnership with the Department for Environment, Food and Rural Affairs (Defra) published a 'roadmap' that set out the timeline for the project to incorporate natural capital into the national accounts. The Natural Capital Committee was providing advice to help inform this project. These accounts, once complete, will enable natural capital to be incorporated into mainstream economic decision-making.

Environmental Accounts in this chapter are separated into three categories:

Natural resources accounts

- Oil and gas reserves – providing information in physical and monetary terms
- Forestry – providing information on woodland area, diversity and consumption of wood products in Great Britain

Physical flow accounts

- Fossil fuel and energy consumption – a breakdown of fossil fuel use and energy consumption by source and industry
- Atmospheric emissions – a breakdown of greenhouse gas emissions by types of gases and industry
- Material flows – presents information on the total mass of natural resources and products used by the UK

Monetary accounts

- Environmental taxes – information on government revenue from environmental taxes
- Environmental protection expenditure – a breakdown of environmental protection expenditure by General Government

The relationships between the economy and environment are explored in detail in the UK Environmental Accounts.

=== Supplementary information ===
This includes a glossary of terms and articles relating to National Accounts.

== Brief summary of data sources ==
The following table shows a summary of sources either directly or indirectly used.

Brief summary of data sources
ONS sources	Other government departments	Non-government sources
Annual Business Survey	Bank of England	Association of British Insurers
Business Spend on Capital Items	Department for Environment, Food and Rural Affairs	Civil Aviation Authority
Expenditure and Food Survey	Department of the Environment, Transport and the Regions	Company annual reports and accounts
Financial Inquiries	Department of Enterprise, Trade and Investment (Northern Ireland)	Company financial websites
Inter-Departmental Business Register	Department for Transport	Regulatory accounts
International Passenger Survey	Department of Health	
International Trade in Services Inquiry	Department of Trade and Industry	
Monthly inquiry into Distribution and Services Sector	Her Majesty's Revenue and Customs (including INTRASTAT data)	
Monthly Production Inquiry	Her Majesty's Treasury	
Perpetual Inventory Model	Ministry of Defence	
PRODCOM	Department for Communities and Local Government	
Quarterly Profits Inquiry
Quarterly Capital Expenditure
Quarterly Stocks Inquiry
Range of ad hoc pilot surveys
VAT paid and VAT turnover data
