= Value product =

The value product (VP) is an economic concept formulated by Karl Marx in his critique of political economy during the 1860s, and used in Marxian social accounting theory for capitalist economies. Its annual monetary value is approximately equal to the netted sum of six flows of income generated by production:

- wages and salaries of employees.
- profit including distributed and undistributed profit.
- interest paid by producing enterprises from current gross income
- rent paid by producing enterprises from current gross income, including land rents.
- tax on the production of new value, including income tax and indirect tax on producers.
- fees paid by producing enterprises from current gross income, including: royalties, certain honorariums and corporate officers' fees, various insurance charges, and certain leasing fees incurred in production and paid from current gross income.

The last five money-incomes are components of realized surplus value. In principle, the value product also includes unsold inventories of new outputs. Marx's concept corresponds roughly with the concept of value added in national accounts, with some important differences (see below) and with the provision that it applies only to the net output of capitalist production, not to the valuation of all production in a society, part of which may of course not be commercial production at all.

== Definition ==
The concept is formulated more precisely when Marx considers the reproduction and distribution of the national income (see e.g. his manuscript called "Results of the Immediate [or Direct] Process of Production", available in English in the Pelican edition of Das Kapital), and also online; and the last chapters of Das Kapital Volume 3).

Marx wrote this in 1864, i.e. about 70 years or so before the first comprehensive Gross National Product and Capital Formation statistics were pioneered by the likes of Wassily Leontief, Richard Stone, Simon Kuznets and Colin Clark (the United Nations standard accounting system was first finalised in 1953). Marx's manuscript for Das Kapital Vol. 3 ends with a discussion of "relations of distribution", but he did not live to complete his analysis. In outline his approach is quite clear however.

Marx called gross output (or the total value of output sales) the "value of production" ("VPn").

If variable capital paid $= V$, circulating constant capital consumed $= C_c$, fixed capital consumed $= C_f$, and surplus value produced $= S$, then:

$VP_n = C_c+C_f+V+S =$ Gross Output

and

$VP = V+S =$ true new value added

So, Marx's "value product" really expressed his view of the true total new value added or the net product. In his view, this total is equal to the value of wage payments + surplus value, the latter which would include, apart from net profit, interest and rent, the net tax levy and royalty-type fees paid in respect of incomes generated by production of output, plus the surplus-value component of unsold inventories of new output. Marx himself never discussed taxation and royalty-income in detail; they were only a small portion of the total national income when he lived (around 5-10% or so).

== An additional comment by Marx ==
Marx claims that, in an accounting period, the workforce in the capitalist sector normally produces a new value which is equal to its own wage-cost, plus an additional new value (called surplus value).

However, Marx warns that:

"The habit of representing surplus-value and value of labor-power as fractions of the value created — a habit that originates in the capitalist mode of production itself, and whose import will hereafter be disclosed — conceals the very transaction that characterizes capital, namely the exchange of variable capital for living labor-power, and the consequent exclusion of the laborer from the product. Instead of the real fact, we have false semblance of an association, in which laborer and capitalist divide the product in proportion to the different elements which they respectively contribute towards its formation."

— Karl Marx

For this reason, Marx criticized ratios such as the share of profits and wages (wage share) in the gross or net product as deceptive, because they disguised the real capitalist relations of production, specifically the rate of surplus value. His primary interest was in the ratio between generic profits and wages (the rate of exploitation).

== Marxian new value added, versus GDP ==
The equation of new value added with net output or GDP (also known as gross value added) would have made no sense to Marx, mainly because net output includes depreciation (or the consumption of fixed capital), yet excludes various property rents paid by producing enterprises from their gross income (on the ground that renting out an asset does not itself constitute production) as well as a portion of net interest (regarded as property income).

As regards depreciation, for Marx the value of real depreciation at least did not constitute any new value, but, value conserved and transferred to the new products by living labor. It appeared as added value, only because when costs are deducted from gross sales income to obtain net profit, depreciation is regarded as a component of the new gross profit income. In official national accounts, a distinction is made between gross value added (including depreciation charges) and net value added (excluding them).

Of course, in reality it could be that real ("economic") depreciation diverges from depreciation for tax purposes. In that case, the reported consumption of fixed capital could contain an element of undistributed profit. Additionally, official national accounts may include in consumption of fixed capital the value of those insurance premiums, interest and rents paid from gross income, which relate directly to the acquisition or maintenance of productive fixed assets, on the ground that they are part of the cost of operating productive fixed assets. In Marxian economics, however, these flows would be regarded either as a faux frais of production, a circulating constant capital outlay, or an element of gross surplus value.

By contrast, Marx considered rents paid by producing enterprises from their gross income as a part of surplus value, and as an integral part of the cost structure of the social product. Business rents, excluded as intermediate expenditures from GDP, therefore are included in the Marxian value product as a component of surplus value.

From a Marxian point of view, official value added also includes some dubious components such as the rental value of owner-occupied housing. This entry is the market rent of owner-occupied housing that would apply if the housing was rented, treated as a "service". But most of it does not refer to any real flow of income, nor is it clear that this component has anything to do with production.

As regards net interest, the official product accounts will exclude a portion of it, insofar as it is defined as property income unrelated to the value of production. But if it is paid from current gross revenues of producing enterprises, then it should be included in the Marxian value product. For this reason, the Marxian net interest aggregate is likely to be larger than the official one.

== Criticism and controversy ==
Marx's idea of value creation and value product makes little sense from the point of view of the theory of factors of production and production functions.

Marx himself already anticipated this, in chapter 48 of Capital Vol. 3, titled "The Trinity Formula" where he discusses the view that land, labour and capital (which he sarcastically calls the "holy trinity" of political economy) all create a new value equal to factor income (Marx regarded human labour and land as the mainsprings of material wealth, but he considered value as a purely social attribution referring to labor-content). In modern macroeconomics, the controversy surfaces again, and is discussed in amusing essays by Prof. Anwar Shaikh (see references).

In Marxian social accounting, one theoretical controversy concerns the treatment of the wages of so-called productive and unproductive labour. Unproductive labour by definition does not make net additions to the new value product, but only transfers value from other sectors on the basis that it reduces the costs of capitalist production. Depending on how the gross and net product are defined, the value of these wages could be accounted for either as a component of surplus value, or as a circulating constant capital outlay, or be excluded from the value product altogether.

Different interpretations are offered by Shane Mage, Murray Smith, Anwar Shaikh and Fred Moseley. One aspect often overlooked in this controversy is that wages costs and labour costs are not the same thing. Employers and employees must also pay social insurance levies of various types, and there may be other imposts on wages; also, the buying power of wages is reduced by indirect tax imposts and profit imposts. This affects the magnitude of a society's variable capital and the value of labour power.

Another Marxian accounting controversy, less discussed, concerns which net tax receipts of government constitute part of the new value product. Obviously taxes included in official gross product measures do not equal the net total tax take, because some taxes are unrelated to production and therefore excluded. The Marxian critique of public finance appears to be rather undeveloped as yet, however. In principle, net tax levied on current production and paid out of current gross revenues would be included in the value product.

Least discussed is the problem of finding a non-arbitrary, rigorous distinction between value created and value transferred in respect of services. The conceptual problem here is essentially that it may be difficult to specify unambiguously what the nature and function of the "product" sold is, when services are rendered.

Some Marxists have argued however that Marx's value relations and value aggregates cannot be measured at all, and at best only experienced. That was manifestly not Marx's view; already in his Grundrisse manuscript he had referred to a balance sheet cited by Malthus; in Das Kapital he attempted to calculate the rate of surplus value according to data provided by Frederick Engels; and towards the end of his life, as Leontief noted, he wrote that he wanted to study the "ups and downs" of economic activity mathematically (but Samuel Moore convinced him that the data to do it did not exist yet). Engels later remarked that the problem really was that much data relevant to testing Marx's concepts simply was not available.

Subsequent Marxian scholars have argued the critique of political economy should continue, with regard to the new economic concepts and theories, rather than stop at the point where the ink dried on the last sheet of paper that Marx wrote on. One reason is that the new concepts and theories might distort the representation of economic reality, just as much as the old ones that Marx criticized.

In the USSR and other Soviet-type societies, Marx's social accounting approach strongly influenced the Material Product System (MPS), a social accounting method alternative to GDP accounts, which distinguished sharply between "productive" and "non-productive" sectors of the economy. These accounts focused on balances of the value of material goods produced. In some respects, this is ironic, since Marx's social accounting referred to the capitalist economy, not to a socialist economy. The MPS accounts were abandoned in favour of GDP accounts after the downfall of official communism in the USSR and Eastern Europe, although they are still compiled as parallel accounts in North Korea and Cuba.

== See also ==
- Abstract labour and concrete labour
- Compensation of employees
- Intermediate consumption
- Labour theory of value
- National income and product accounts
- Operating surplus
- Surplus labour
- Surplus product
