= Gross fixed capital formation =

Macroeconomic concept

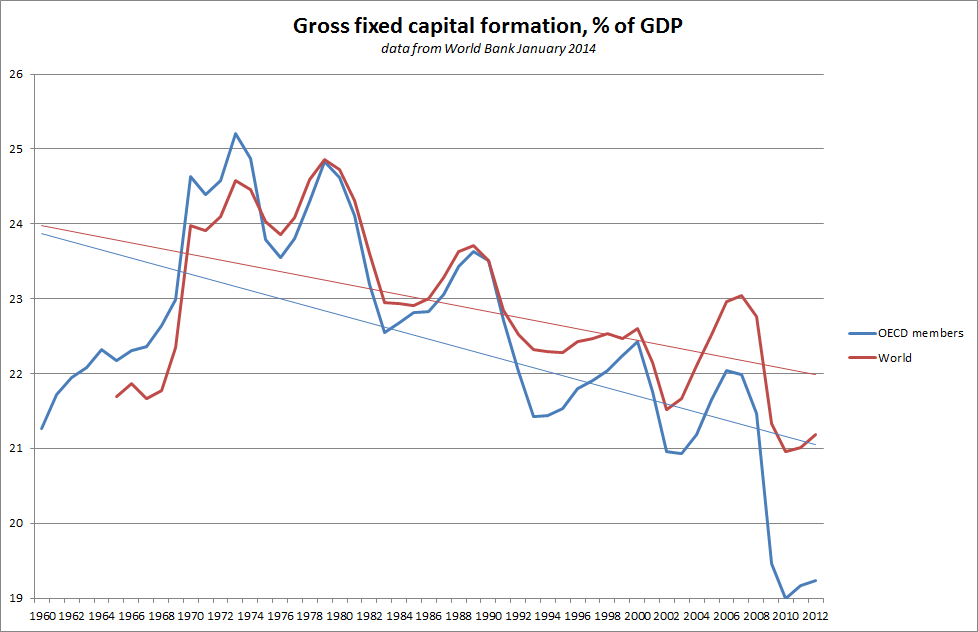
Gross capital formation in % of gross domestic product in world economy

Gross fixed capital formation (GFCF) is a component of the expenditure on gross domestic product (GDP) that indicates how much of the new value added in an economy is invested rather than consumed. It measures the value of acquisitions of new or existing fixed assets by the business sector, governments, and "pure" households (excluding their unincorporated enterprises) minus disposals of fixed assets.

GFCF is a macroeconomic concept used in official national accounts such as the United Nations System of National Accounts (UNSNA), National Income and Product Accounts (NIPA), and the European System of Accounts (ESA). The concept dates back to the National Bureau of Economic Research (NBER) studies of Simon Kuznets of capital formation in the 1930s, and standard measures for it were adopted in the 1950s.

GFCF is called "gross" fixed capital formation because the measure does not make any adjustments to deduct the consumption of fixed capital (depreciation of fixed assets) from investment figures. In analyzing the development of the productive capital stock, it is important to measure the value of the acquisitions less disposals of fixed assets beyond replacement for obsolescence of existing assets due to normal wear and tear. "Net fixed investment" includes the depreciation of existing assets from the figures for new fixed investment, and is called net fixed capital formation.

GFCF is not a measure of total investment, because only the value of net additions to fixed assets is measured, and all kinds of financial assets are excluded, as well as stocks of inventories and other operating costs (the latter included in intermediate consumption). If, for example, one examines a company balance sheet, it is easy to see that fixed assets are only one component of the total annual capital outlay.

GFCF notably excludes land sales and purchases. This is because when land is sold, the total amount of land in existence does not increase. Additionally, it is challenging to estimate the value of land in a standardized way. Therefore, only the value of land improvement is included in the GFCF measure as a net addition to wealth. In special cases, such as land reclamation from the sea, a river, or a lake (e.g. a polder), new land can be created and sold where it did not exist before, adding to fixed assets. The GFCF measure always applies to the resident enterprises of a national territory, and thus if a new enterprise is created, such as oil exploration on the open seas, the associated new fixed investment is allocated to the national territory in which the relevant enterprises are resident.

Data is usually provided by statistical agencies annually and quarterly, but only within a certain time-lag. GFCF is often considered to be a meaningful indicator of future business activity, business confidence, and patterns of economic growth. In times of economic uncertainty or recession, typically business investment in fixed assets will be reduced, since it ties up additional capital for a longer interval of time, with a risk that it will not pay itself off (and fixed assets may therefore also be scrapped faster). Conversely, in times of robust economic growth, fixed investment will increase across the board, because the observed market expansion makes it likely that such investment will be profitable in the future. This is the cross value end of the year of a country.

== Definition ==
Detailed standard definitions of gross fixed capital formation (GFCF) are provided by the United Nations System of National Accounts (UNSNA) and the IMF Balance of Payments system. The definitions used by the US Bureau for Economic Analysis for the National Income & Product Accounts (NIPA) and in the European System of Accounts (ESA) are very similar.

GFCF is a flow value. It is measured by the total value of a producer's acquisitions, less disposals of fixed assets during the accounting period plus certain additions to the value of non-produced assets (such as subsoil assets or major improvements in the quantity, quality or productivity of land) realised by the productive activity of institutional units. In this way GFCF is a measure of gross net investment (acquisitions less disposals) in fixed capital assets by enterprises, government and households within the domestic economy, during an accounting period such as a quarter or a year:

- Fixed assets are acquired through purchases, barter trade, capital transfers in kind, financial lease, improvement of fixed assets and natural growth of those natural assets that yield repeat products. The acquisition value includes acquisition taxes and fees and measures "all-up" costs of fixed investment.
- Fixed assets are disposed of by sales, barter trade and capital transfers in kind. Disposal of fixed assets excludes consumption of fixed capital and exceptional losses due to natural disasters.

It is worth noting that fixed assets in national accounts have a broader coverage than fixed assets in business accounts. Fixed assets are produced assets that are used repeatedly or continuously in production processes for more than one year. The stock of produced fixed assets consists of tangible assets (e.g. residential and non-residential building, roads, bridges, airports, railway, machinery, transport equipment, office equipment, vineyards and orchards, breeding livestock, dairy livestock, draught animals, sheep and other animals reared for their wool). The European System of Accounts (ESA95) explicitly includes produced intangible assets (e.g. mineral exploration, computer software, copyright protected entertainment, literary and artistics originals) within the definition of fixed assets.

The range of fixed assets included in statistical measurement is defined by the purpose in using them. A vehicle for example is a fixed asset, but vehicles are included in GFCF only if they are actually used in work activities, i.e. if they fall within the scope of "production". A car for personal use only is not normally included. The boundaries are not always easy to define however, since vehicles may be used both for personal purposes and for work purposes; a conventional rule is usually applied in that case.

Non-produced assets (e.g. land except the value of land improvements, subsoil assets, mineral reserves, natural resources such as water, primary forests) are excluded from the official measure of GFCF. Also ordinary repair work, purchases of durable household equipment (e.g. private cars and furniture) and animals reared for their meat are not part of GFCF.

In the 1993 version of the UNSNA (2003 SNA) the acquisition of armaments is not recorded as GFCF but as final consumption expenditure and intermediate consumption. The definition of fixed assets was reviewed with the update of the SNA that led to the System of National Accounts 2008 (2008 SNA). Expenditure on weapons that meet the general definition of assets have been reclassified as GFCF.

It is sometimes difficult to draw an exact statistical boundary between GFCF and intermediate consumption, insofar as the expenditure concerns alterations to fixed assets owned. In some cases, this expenditure can refer to new fixed investment, in others only to operating costs relating to the maintenance or repair of fixed assets. Some countries include the insurance of fixed assets as part of GFCF.

An important change in the GFCF boundary in the 2008 SNA relates to the treatment of expenditure on research and development (R&D). R&D which is measured by the value of expenditures on creative work undertaken on a systematic basis in order to increase the stock of knowledge, and the use of this stock to devise new applications, it is argued, should be recognized as part of GFCF. This means that R&D expenditure is recorded as the production of an asset instead of intermediate consumption, which has the effect of increasing GDP. This output measure focuses on the direct effect of R&D only; external benefits of R&D are not considered in this output measurement. Also, the 2008 SNA still explicitly excludes human capital as assets.

== Data and time series ==
While it is not possible to measure the value of the total fixed capital stock very accurately, it is possible to obtain a fairly reliable measure of the trend in net additions to the stock of fixed capital, since the purchase prices of investment goods are recorded. Usually statistics departments provide quarterly and annual data on GFCF. The GFCF of "pure" households is often considered as an indicator of households' confidence in the future since it consists of their investments in dwellings. However, the GFCF figure for dwellings refers only to the value of the net additions of the housing stock and housing improvements.

Often detailed breakdowns are available on request for GFCF,

- by type of asset (plant, machinery, land improvements, buildings, vehicles, etc.)
- by industry (for example, manufacturing, construction, services)
- economic sector (residential buildings versus non-residential buildings, or government sector versus private sector, the market sector versus the non-market sector).

GFCF time series data is often used to analyse the trends in investment activity over time, deflating or reflating the series using a price index. But it is also used to obtain alternative measures of the fixed capital stock. This stock could be measured at surveyed "book value", but the problem there is that the book values are often a mixture of valuations such as historic cost, current replacement cost, current sale value and scrap value. That is, there is no uniform valuation.

Using the alternative of the so-called "perpetual inventory method", one begins with a benchmark asset figure and then cumulates GFCF year by year (or quarter by quarter), while deducting depreciation according to some method, all data being adjusted for price inflation using a capital expenditure price index. Sometimes statisticians calculate "average service lives" for assets as a basis for valuation and depreciation estimates.

Econometricians acknowledge that the value of fixed assets is almost impossible to measure accurately, because of the difficulty of obtaining a standard valuation for all assets. By implication, it is also almost impossible to obtain a reliable measure of the aggregate rate of profit on physical capital invested, i.e. the rate of return. Arguably though, the data do provide an "indicator" of the trend over time; using mathematical models one can estimate that the true rate is most likely to lie within certain quantitative limits.

In recent times, Eurostat publishes the "business investment rate" (also called the "gross investment rate of non-financial corporations") in its quarterly sector accounts for the EU27. This ratio is defined as gross fixed capital formation divided by gross value added, in other words the share of GFCF in gross product. It provides an indication of how much of the total factor income is reinvested in new fixed assets. Normally that ratio is about 20–23% of gross value-added. However, calling it the "business investment rate" or the "gross investment rate" is somewhat deceptive, since this indicator refers only to fixed investment, and more specifically, the net fixed investment (fixed assets bought, less disposals of fixed assets). The actual total funds which are spent by enterprises on investments, in gross terms, are much larger, both because enterprises invest in far more than fixed assets only (they also buy intermediate goods and services, and some financial assets), and because the total money they spend on buying fixed assets is larger than the same sum netted of asset disposals. The main reason why this Eurostat indicator is published is that it shows something about the longer-term expectations of enterprises. If business confidence is low, enterprises are less likely to tie up new earnings in additional fixed assets, which are usually held for a number of years. If, on the other hand, business confidence is buoyant, it is more likely that enterprises will spend more of their current earnings on longer-term investments in fixed assets. In turn, the rate at which enterprises invest earnings in longer-term assets is an indicator of business expansion – if the rate declines, then this typically lowers the rate of cumulative business expansion. For example, in the aftermath of the 2008 financial crisis, the ratio dropped to slightly below 20% in Q1 2010 from a high of 23% in Q2 2008. Although this 3% drop in the ratio may not seem so large, in reality it signifies a very large amount of money that was no longer spent. The reason is that the total gross investment and gross value-added for the European Union amount to trillions of euro's, while the total gross value-added also fell significantly in 2008-2010.

== Economic analysis ==
Differences in the investment rates between countries very often mirror different levels of economic development and catching-up processes. This may be illustrated for the example of the member states of the European Union. Since the beginning of the millennium the average ratio of GFCF to GDP fluctuates around 20% in the European Union of 27 member states as a whole (EU-27). For some member states which accessed the Union in 2004 and later (mostly countries in central and eastern Europe where the level of GDP is still comparably low), the ratio rose to more than 25% in some years. When the consumption of fixed capital is deducted from the figures the resulting ratio of net fixed capital formation to net domestic product is around 8% for the average of the EU-27; again substantially higher ratios of more than 15% can be observed for some of the new EU member states such as Spain. Higher investment rates in poorer countries will lead to more equivalent living condition across Europe in the long-term through accelerated economic growth and an improved equipment of the labour force with modern infrastructure and technology. The detailed data on which these observations were made can be downloaded from Eurostat's website.

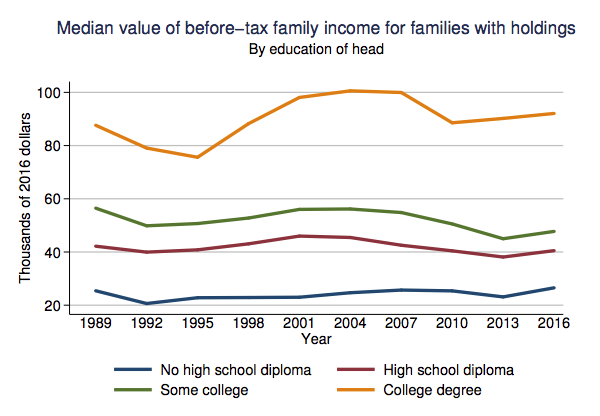
Mean income of U.S. families by education of head, 1989–2010. Government investment in college tuition subsidies usually can increase tax revenue.

Infrastructure spending is considered government investment because it will usually save money in the long run, and thereby reduce the net present value of government liabilities. Spending on physical infrastructure in the U.S. returns an average of about $1.92 for each $1.00 spent on nonresidential construction because it is almost always less expensive to maintain than repair or replace once it has become unusable. Similarly, public subsidy of college tuition will increase the net present value of income tax receipts because college educated taxpayers earn much more than those without college education. Likewise, government spending on social infrastructure, such as preventative health care, can save several hundreds of billions of dollars per year in the U.S., because for example cancer patients are more likely to be diagnosed at Stage I where curative treatment is typically a few outpatient visits, instead of at Stage III or later in an emergency room where treatment can involve years of hospitalization and is often terminal.

== Second-hand fixed assets ==
The fixed assets purchased may nowadays include substantial used assets traded on second-hand markets, the quantitatively most significant items being road vehicles, planes, and industrial machinery. Worldwide, this growing trade is worth hundreds of billions of dollars, and countries in Eastern Europe and Latin America, Russia, China, India and Morocco use large quantities of second-hand machinery. Often it is bought from Europe, North America and Japan, where fixed assets are on average scrapped more quickly.

Fixed assets disposed of may be sold for continued use by another producer, abandoned by the owner, sold as scrap, or recycled in part or as a whole. But occasionally a complete industrial plant is purchased, dismantled and reassembled somewhere else. Because GFCF conceptually includes many transactions in used fixed assets by resident firms, which are valued lower than new assets, this creates problems for the estimation and valuation of the gross capital stock.

If enterprise A sells a used asset to enterprise B, the valuation errors caused by the way that A and B each report this transaction will cancel out only if an overstatement of A’s reported GFCF is exactly matched by the understatement in B’s reported GFCF. But if assets migrate from one industry to another, or are imported and exported, or (in the case of means of transport) switch between different uses, the errors will persist. It may appear as though the total fixed capital stock has grown, even although the “net addition to fixed assets” refers only to the change in ownership of an already existing asset.

Statistical treatment of the trade in second-hand fixed assets varies among different countries. Increasingly an attempt is made in many countries to identify the trade in second-hand assets separately if it occurs on a quantitatively significant scale (for example, vehicles). In principle, if a fixed asset is bought during the year by one organization, and then resold to another organization during the same year, it should not be counted as investment twice over in that year; otherwise the true growth of the fixed capital stock would be overestimated. Hence statistical agencies traditionally often measured only the acquisition of newly produced fixed assets, or else tried to measure the net purchases of used assets. In general, also, the expenditure on Gross Domestic Product of which GFCF is a component should definitionally include only newly produced fixed assets, not second-hand assets. GDP is supposed to measure the net new output, the new value added to the existing stock of wealth. But given a growing domestic and international trade in second-hand equipment, GFCF may understate the true level of gross fixed investment activity and overstate the real additions to the capital stock, insofar as fixed assets produced at a previous time and resold later are also invested in, without this showing up in the accounts.

== Weaponry in the 2008 Revision of the UNSNA ==
In the 1993 UNSNA standards (and earlier), offensive weaponry and their means of delivery were excluded from capital formation, regardless of the length of their service life. Conceptually, the UNSNA accounts regarded military assets as providing "defence services" only at the point of their acquisition. Arms expenditure regarded as intermediate consumption could, according to this accounting treatment, only refer to sales or exports in a different accounting period.

If weapons were sold during the same year or a quarter, this necessitated "counter-intuitive" entries in the accounts for government (a capital addition is cited as a capital deduction, and vice versa). The 2008 UNSNA revision therefore recommends that all military expenditure that meets general UNSNA criteria for capital formation (investment in goods which are used in production for more than one year) will be treated as capital formation. Weapons systems and military inventories will be separately distinguished within fixed capital formation and inventories .

This approach somewhat increases the measure of total GFCF and by implication the total GDP of arms-producing countries, because expenditures and sales of weaponry are very large, especially in the United States and Europe. According to the Swedish research institute SIPRI, global military expenditure by governments in 2008 is estimated to have totaled $1,464 billion, or approximately 2.4% of the value of world GDP in 2008, but arms expenditure is only one component of this expenditure. In 2007, the combined arms sales of the SIPRI Top 100 arms-producing companies reached $347 billion. According to SIPRI, forty-four US companies accounted for 61 per cent of the Top 100’s arms sales in 2007, while 32 West European companies accounted for 31 per cent of the sales. Russia, Japan, Israel and India accounted for most of the rest. Including US arms sales in US GDP would raise the measure by up to 1.8%.

The main original reasons for largely excluding military weaponry expenditures from total asset, investment and gross product measures were that military weaponry is used to destroy people and property, which is not value-adding production (although rebuilding destroyed assets can stimulate the economy), and/or that the relevant figures were a military secret. However, since military capital expenditures consume a large amount of tax money, and because it is difficult to hide expenditures on weaponry, it is nowadays argued that it is appropriate that those expenditures should be publicly accounted for.

== See also ==
- Capital formation
- Consumption of fixed capital
- European System of Accounts
- Fixed capital
- Fixed investment
- Intermediate consumption
- Investment-specific technological progress
