= Operating surplus =

National accounts measure of operating profit

Operating surplus is an accounting concept used in national accounts statistics (such as United Nations System of National Accounts (UNSNA)) and in corporate and government accounts. It is the balancing item of the Generation of Income Account in the UNSNA. It may be used in macro-economics as a proxy for total pre-tax profit income, although entrepreneurial income may provide a better measure of business profits. According to the 2008 SNA, it is the measure of the surplus accruing from production before deducting property income, e.g., land rent and interest.

Operating surplus is a component of value added and GDP. The term "mixed income" is used when operating surplus cannot be distinguished from wage income, for example, in the case of sole proprietorships. Most of operating surplus will normally consist of gross profit income. In principle, it includes the (separately itemised) increase in the value of output inventories held, with or without a valuation adjustment reflecting average prices during the accounting of the given period of time.

Operating surplus therefore does not necessarily refer to all gross profit income realized in an economy. Profits are also realized from all kinds of property transactions which do not involve new production, such as capital gains, and net profits are often also received from foreign countries or paid to foreign countries. In addition, many profits arising from the use of natural resources, land, and financial assets (in the form of interest income) will not be included.

== Derivation of operating surplus in UNSNA ==
A simple definition of business profit would be "sales less costs", and the accounting derivation of operating surplus is similar (although the SNA concept of entrepreneurial income better matches what is thought of as business profits). Starting off with Gross Output, expenditure on intermediate goods and services are deducted, to arrive at gross value added.

Value added may be stated gross (equal to the net output value, including consumption of fixed capital, i.e. depreciation charges) or net (excluding consumption of fixed capital). The net operating surplus (NOS) is thus the residual balancing item in the product account, obtained as follows:

- Gross value added (GV)
- less consumption of fixed capital. (CFC)
- equals net value added (NV)
- less Compensation of employees (CE)
- less indirect taxes paid by producers, reduced by producer subsidies received (IT-SU)
- equals net operating surplus (NOS)

In simple equations,

NOS=GV - (CE + (IT-SU) + CFC)

or

NOS=NV - (CE + (IT-SU)

Operating surplus can of course also be stated gross (GOS):

GOS=NOS + CFC

In this case, depreciation charges are included.

== Exclusions ==
In UNSNA, "implicit (imputed) rents" on land owned by the enterprise and the "implicit (imputed) interest" chargeable on the use of the enterprise's own funds are excluded from operating surplus.

Operating surplus also excludes property incomes considered to be unrelated to value-adding production.

== Mixed income ==
The category of operating surplus is applied to the whole economy, and therefore may include more than gross corporate profit income. For example, profit income by self-employed operators.

In UNSNA, "Mixed Income" refers to the balancing item of accounts for unincorporated enterprises owned by members of households, either individually or in partnership with others, in which the self-employed owners, or other members of their households, work and obtain income other than wages or salaries, which is included in operating surplus.

In practice, all unincorporated enterprises owned by households that are not quasi-corporations fall in this category, except for the "imputed rental value of owner-occupied housing" and paid domestic staff employed by households, an activity that is considered to generate no surplus.

Some countries separately itemise this mixed income in their accounts, other do not.

== The effect of ownership relations on operating surplus in UNSNA ==
The size of total operating surplus is in theory not affected by whether the assets used in production are owned or rented by the enterprise, or whether assets owned by the enterprise and used in production are financed out of its own funds (or equity capital) or out of borrowed funds (or loan capital).

But if buildings, other structures, machinery or equipment are rented by an enterprise, the payments of rentals under an operating lease or similar lease are recorded as purchases of services (Intermediate consumption). Thus, the payment of a rental on a fixed asset reduces its gross value added, below what it would be, if the producer owned the asset.

The impact of this on net value added is offset to some extent by the fact that a tenant, or lessee, incurs no asset depreciation, whereas an owner would. But net value added will be lower when a fixed asset is rented, because the rental has to cover the lessor's operating and interest costs as well as asset depreciation. Thus, the size of net operating surplus will vary according to whether fixed assets are rented, or purchased.

Enterprises may furthermore invest surplus capital in financial assets or real estate assets, especially in times of uncertainty or high interest rates. Considerable property income may be received from such investments. In UNSNA, this property income does not constitute part of value added in production, and is therefore excluded from operating surplus (except for what is called the services of the financial, insurance and real estate industry).

If therefore an increasing amount of business income consists of property income rather than income from production, this will lower value added, and lower operating surplus.

== Criticism of UNSNA concept ==
As stated, operating surplus is a residual item in national accounts of gross product. It is "analogous" to what is "left over" when a business deducts its costs from sales revenue in order to arrive at its profit total. However, the analogy is somewhat deceptive, insofar as the operating surplus in national accounts, as a component of value added, is not truly equal to real generic pre-tax profit receipts.

The main reason for that is simply that, in calculating this aggregate, various items are added and deducted from an initial surveyed (or tax-declared) gross profit figure in a way that is consistent with the concept of value added.

Or, to put it a different way, the definition of operating surplus is dependent on the general definition of Gross Output from production. To obtain a measure of value added in production, all those income flows considered to be unrelated to production (mainly, property income and transfer income) are excluded from the valuation of Gross Output. Therefore, this is one reason why the operating surplus cited in national accounts is likely to be lower than real generic pre-tax profit income. An additional problem is the practice of shifting the declaration of profit income to another country where taxes are lower, by means of various financial manipulations. Again that leads to an understatement of domestic profits.

The trend in operating surplus over time will normally be similar to the general trend in gross business profits, but in Marxian economics operating surplus is rejected as an adequate proxy for total gross profit or surplus value.

The main reason is that in Marxian economics the official concepts of Gross Output and value added are not accepted as an adequate definition of the value of production. Among other things, a fraction of profit, interest and rent income which is payable from the gross income of producing enterprises is excluded from value added in the official accounts, on the ground that it is unrelated to production. Marxian economists however argue that fraction is part of the value of production and the value product, insofar it has to be paid out of current revenues of producing enterprises.

This Marxian interpretation implies a somewhat different view of the real cost structure of production, and the real composition of product values, and to obtain alternative measures, the official accounts must be substantially reaggregated to make explicit the sources and receipts of income from salaries, profits, interest, rent, taxes and social insurance levies, subsidies, royalties and fees, and their contribution to the valuation of gross product (see also value product).

In the Marxian view, obtaining generic profit income from sales is precisely the prime motivator of capitalist business activity, and therefore to present this income as a "generic residual balancing item" in national accounts without making its components explicit does no justice to the real economic relations involved.

== See also ==
- Accounting
- Capital surplus
- Consumer surplus
- Cost of capital
- Economic surplus
- Producer surplus
- Profit (accounting)
- Surplus product
- Surplus value
- United Nations System of National Accounts (UNSNA)
