= Economic data =

Economic data are data describing an actual economy, past or present. These are typically found in time-series form, that is, covering more than one time period (say the monthly unemployment rate for the last five years) or in cross-sectional data in one time period (say for consumption and income levels for sample households). Data may also be collected from surveys of for example individuals and firms or aggregated to sectors and industries of a single economy or for the international economy. A collection of such data in table form comprises a data set.

Methodological economic and statistical elements of the subject include measurement, collection, analysis, and publication of data. 'Economic statistics' may also refer to a subtopic of official statistics produced by official organizations (e.g. statistical institutes, intergovernmental organizations such as United Nations, European Union or OECD, central banks, ministries, etc.). Economic data provide an empirical basis for economic research, whether descriptive or econometric. Data archives are also a key input for assessing the replicability of empirical findings and for use in decision making as to economic policy.

At the level of an economy, many data are organized and compiled according to the methodology of national accounting. Such data include Gross National Product and its components, Gross National Expenditure, Gross National Income in the National Income and Product Accounts, and also the capital stock and national wealth. In these examples data may be stated in nominal or real values, that is, in money or inflation-adjusted terms. Other economic indicators include a variety of alternative measures of output, orders, trade, the labor force, confidence, prices, and financial series (e.g., money and interest rates). At the international level there are many series including international trade, international financial flows, direct investment flows (between countries) and exchange rates.

For time-series data, reported measurements can be hourly (e.g. for stock markets), daily, monthly, quarterly, or annually. Estimates such as averages are often subjected to seasonal adjustment to remove weekly or seasonal-periodicity elements, for example, holiday-period sales and seasonal unemployment.

Within a country the data are usually produced by one or more statistical organizations, e.g., a governmental or quasi-governmental organization and/or the central banks. International statistics are produced by several international bodies and firms, including the International Monetary Fund and the Bank for International Settlements.

Studies in experimental economics may also generate data, rather than using data collected for other purposes. Designed randomized experiments may provide more reliable conclusions than do observational studies. Like epidemiology, economics often studies the behavior of humans over periods too long to allow completely controlled experiments, in which case economists can use observational studies or quasi-experiments; in these studies, economists collect data which are then analyzed with statistical methods (econometrics).

Many methods can be used to analyse the data. These include, e.g., time-series analysis using multiple regression, Box–Jenkins analysis, and seasonality analysis. Analysis may be univariate (modeling one series) or multivariate (from several series). Econometricians, economic statisticians, and financial analysts formulate models, whether for past relationships or for economic forecasting. These models may include partial equilibrium microeconomics aimed at examining particular parts of an economy or economies, or they may cover a whole economic system, as in general equilibrium theory or in macroeconomics. Economists use these models to understand past events and to forecast future events, e.g., demand, prices and employment. Methods have also been developed for analyzing or correcting results from use of incomplete data and errors in variables.

== Economic data issues ==
Good economic data are a precondition to effective macroeconomic management. With the complexity of modern economies and the lags inherent in macroeconomic policy instruments, a country must have the capacity to promptly identify any adverse trends in its economy and to apply the appropriate corrective measure. This cannot be done without economic data that is complete, accurate and timely.

Increasingly, the availability of good economic data is coming to be seen by international markets as an indicator of a country that is a promising destination for foreign investment. International investors are aware that good economic data is necessary for a country to effectively manage its affairs and, other things being equal, will tend to avoid countries that do not publish such data.

The public availability of reliable and up-to-date economic data also reassures international investors by allowing them to monitor economic developments and to manage their investment risk. The severity of the Mexican and Asian financial crises was made worse by the realization by investors that the authorities had hidden a deteriorating economic situation by slow and incomplete reporting of critical economic data. Being unsure of exactly how bad the economic situation was, they tried to withdraw their assets quickly and in the process caused further damage to the economies in question. It was the realization that data issues lay behind much of the damage done by these international financial crises that led to the creation of international data quality standards, such as the International Monetary Fund (IMF) General Data Dissemination System (GDDS).

Inside a country, the public availability of good quality economic data allows firms and individuals to make their business decisions with confidence that they understand the overall macroeconomic environment. As with international investors, local business people are less likely to overreact to a piece of bad news if they understand the economic context.

Tax data can be a source of economic data. In the United States, the IRS provides tax statistics, but the data are limited by statutory limitations and confidentiality concerns.
