= Measures of national income and output =

A variety of measures of national income and output are used in economics to estimate total economic activity in a country or region, including gross domestic product (GDP), Gross national income (GNI), net national income (NNI), and adjusted national income (NNI adjusted for natural resource depletion – also called as NNI at factor cost). All are specially concerned with counting the total amount of goods and services produced within the economy and by various sectors. The boundary is usually defined by geography or citizenship, and it is also defined as the total income of the nation and also restrict the goods and services that are counted. For instance, some measures count only goods & services that are exchanged for money, excluding bartered goods, while other measures may attempt to include bartered goods by imputing monetary values to them.

== National accounts ==
Arriving at a figure for the total production of goods and services in a large region like a country entails a large amount of data-collection and calculation. Although some attempts were made to estimate national incomes as long ago as the 17th century, the systematic keeping of national accounts, of which these figures are a part, only began in the 1930s, in the United States and some European countries. The impetus for that major statistical effort was the Great Depression and the rise of Keynesian economics, which prescribed a greater role for the government in managing an economy, and made it necessary for governments to obtain accurate information so that their interventions into the economy could proceed as well-informed as possible.

== Market value ==
In order to count a good or service, it is necessary to assign value to it. The value that the measures of national income and output assign to a good or service is its market value – the price it fetches when bought or sold. The actual usefulness of a product (its use-value) is not measured – assuming the use-value to be any different from its market value.

Three strategies have been used to obtain the market values of all the goods and services produced: the product (or output) method, the expenditure method, and the income method. The product method looks at the economy on an industry-by-industry basis. The total output of the economy is the sum of the outputs of every industry. However, since an output of one industry may be used by another industry and become part of the output of that second industry, to avoid counting the item twice we use not the value output by each industry, but the value-added; that is, the difference between the value of what it puts out and what it takes in. The total value produced by the economy is the sum of the values-added by every industry.

The expenditure method is based on the idea that all products are bought by somebody or some organisation. Therefore, we sum up the total amount of money people and organisations spend in buying things. This amount must equal the value of everything produced. Usually, expenditures by private individuals, expenditures by businesses, and expenditures by government are calculated separately and then summed to give the total expenditure. Also, a correction term must be introduced to account for imports and exports outside the boundary.

The income method works by summing the incomes of all producers within the boundary. Since what they are paid is just the market value of their product, their total income must be the total value of the product. Wages, proprietor's incomes, and corporate profits are the major subdivisions of income.

=== Output ===
The output approach focuses on finding the total output of a nation by directly finding the total value of all goods and services a nation produces.

Because of the complication of the multiple stages in the production of a good or service, only the final value of a good or service is included in the total output. This avoids an issue often called 'double counting', wherein the total value of a good is included several times in national output, by counting it repeatedly in several stages of production. In the example of meat production, the value of the good from the farm may be $10, then $30 from the butchers, and then $60 from the supermarket. The value that should be included in final national output should be $60, not the sum of all those numbers, $100. The values added at each stage of production over the previous stage are respectively $10, $20, and $30. Their sum gives an alternative way of calculating the value of final output.

Key formulae are:

GDP at market price = value of output in the economy - intermediate consumption

NNP at factor cost = GDP at market price - net indirect taxes - depreciation + net factor income from abroad

NDP at factor cost = compensation of employees + net interest + rental & royalty income + profit of incorporated and unincorporated NDP at factor cost

=== Expenditure ===
The expenditure approach is basically an output accounting method. It focuses on finding the total output of a nation by finding the total amount of money spent. This is acceptable to economists, because, like income, the total value of all goods is equal to the total amount of money spent on goods. The basic formula for domestic output takes all the different areas in which money is spent within the region, and then combines them to find the total output.

$\mathrm{GDP} = C + G + I + \left ( \mathrm{X} - M \right )$

where:
C = Consumption (Household consumption expenditures / Personal consumption expenditures)
I = Investment / Gross private domestic investment
G = Government spending (Government consumption / Gross investment expenditures)
X = Exports (Gross exports of goods and services)
M = Imports (Gross imports of goods and services)

Note: (X - M) is often written as X_{N} or less commonly as NX, both stand for "net exports"

The names of the measures consist of one of the words "Gross" or "Net", followed by one of the words "National" or "Domestic", followed by one of the words "Product", "Income", or "Expenditure". All of these terms can be explained separately.

"Gross" means total product, regardless of the use to which it is subsequently put.
"Net" means "Gross" minus the amount that must be used to offset depreciation – ie., wear-and-tear or obsolescence of the nation's fixed capital assets. "Net" gives an indication of how much product is actually available for consumption or new investment.

"Domestic" means the boundary is geographical: we are counting all goods and services produced within the country's borders, regardless of by whom.
"National" means the boundary is defined by citizenship (nationality). We count all goods and services produced by the nationals of the country (or businesses owned by them) regardless of where that production physically takes place.
The output of a French-owned cotton factory in Senegal counts as part of the Domestic figures for Senegal, but the National figures of France.

"Product", "Income", and "Expenditure" refer to the three counting methodologies explained earlier: the product, income, and expenditure approaches. However, the terms are used loosely.
"Product" is the general term, often used when any of the three approaches was actually used. Sometimes the word "Product" is used and then some additional symbol or phrase to indicate the methodology; so, for instance, we get "Gross Domestic Product by income", "GDP (income)", "GDP(I)", and similar constructions.
"Income" specifically means that the income approach was used.
"Expenditure" specifically means that the expenditure approach was used.

All three counting methods should in theory give the same final figure. However, in practice, minor differences are obtained from the three methods for several reasons, including changes in inventory levels and errors in the statistics. One problem for instance is that goods in inventory have been produced (therefore included in Product), but not yet sold (therefore not yet included in Expenditure). Similar timing issues can also cause a slight discrepancy between the value of goods produced (Product) and the payments to the factors that produced the goods (Income), particularly if inputs are purchased on credit, and also because wages are collected often after a period of production.

== Gross domestic product and gross national product ==
Gross domestic product (GDP) is defined as "the value of all final goods and services produced in a country in 1 year".

Gross national product (GNP) is defined as "the market value of all goods and services produced in one year by labour and property supplied by the residents of a country".

As an example, the table below shows some GDP and GNP, and NNI data for the United States:

National income and output for 2003 (billions of dollars)
Gross national product	11,063.3
Net U.S. income receipts from rest of the world	55.2
U.S. income receipts	329.1
U.S. income payments	–273.9
Gross domestic product	11,008.1
Private consumption of fixed capital	1,135.9
Government consumption of fixed capital	218.1
Statistical discrepancy	25.6
National income	9,679.7

- NDP: Net domestic product is defined as "gross domestic product (GDP) minus depreciation of capital", similar to NNP.
- GDP per capita: Gross domestic product per capita is the average market value rendered per person.
- GNI per capita: Gross national income per capita is related to average income per person and mean income.

== National income and welfare ==
GDP per capita (per person) is often used as a measure of a person's welfare. Countries with higher GDP may be more likely to also score high on other measures of welfare, such as life expectancy. However, there are serious limitations to the usefulness of GDP as a measure of welfare:

- Measures of GDP typically exclude unpaid economic activity, most importantly domestic work such as childcare. This leads to distortions; for example, a paid nanny's income contributes to GDP, but an unpaid parent's time spent caring for children will not, even though they are both carrying out the same economic activity.
- GDP takes no account of the inputs used to produce the output. For example, if everyone worked for twice the number of hours, then GDP might roughly double, but this does not necessarily mean that workers are better off as they would have less leisure time. Similarly, the impact of economic activity on the environment is not measured in calculating GDP.
- Comparison of GDP from one country to another may be distorted by movements in exchange rates. Measuring national income at purchasing power parity may overcome this problem at the risk of overvaluing basic goods and services, for example subsistence farming.
- GDP does not measure factors that affect quality of life, such as the quality of the environment (as distinct from the input value) and security from crime. This leads to distortions - for example, spending on cleaning up an oil spill is included in GDP, but the negative impact of the spill on well-being (e.g. loss of clean beaches) is not measured.
- GDP is the mean (average) wealth rather than median (middle-point) wealth. Countries with a skewed income distribution may have a relatively high per-capita GDP while the majority of its citizens have a relatively low level of income, due to concentration of wealth in the hands of a small fraction of the population. See Gini coefficient.

Because of this, other measures of welfare such as the Human Development Index (HDI), Index of Sustainable Economic Welfare (ISEW), Genuine Progress Indicator (GPI), gross national happiness (GNH), and sustainable national income (SNI) are used.

== See also ==
- Capital formation
- Chained volume series
- Compensation of employees
- European System of Accounts
- Green national product
- Gross domestic product
- Gross national income
- Gross national happiness (GNH)
- Gross national income in the European Union
- Gross output
- Input–output model
- Intermediate consumption
- List of countries by real GDP per capita growth
- List of countries by GNI per capita growth
- National accounts
- National Income and Product Accounts
- Net economic welfare
- Net output
- Penn World Table
- Savings identity
- United Nations System of National Accounts (UNSNA)
- Wealth (economics)

== Bibliography ==
- Australian Bureau of Statistics, Australian National Accounts: Concepts, Sources and Methods, 2000. This fairly large document has a wealth of information on the meaning of the national income and output measures and how they are obtained.
