= Net output =

Accounting concept

Net output is an accounting concept used in national accounts such as the United Nations System of National Accounts (UNSNA) and the NIPAs, and sometimes in corporate or government accounts. The concept was originally invented to measure the total net addition to a country's stock of wealth created by production during an accounting interval. The concept of net output is basically "gross revenue from production less the value of goods and services used up in that production". The idea is that if one deducts intermediate expenditures from the annual flow of income generated by production, one obtains a measure of the net new value of the new goods and services created.

== Definition ==
In national accounts, net output is equivalent to the gross value added during an accounting period when producing enterprises use inputs (labor and capital assets) to produce outputs. Gross value added is called "gross" because it includes depreciation charges (or more precisely, consumption of fixed capital). If the value of depreciation is subtracted from gross value-added, we obtain the net value added.

The calculation of net output is importantly influenced by the definition of expenditures and incomes included within the scope of "production" - some incomes and expenditures are included as "factor income" or "factor expenditure" directly related to production, other are not. The calculation involves an accounting procedure of "grossing and netting" the revenues which enterprises obtain from their outputs of goods and services, in order to establish what the real value of those outputs is.

This procedure must consistently identify and distinguish between costs and revenues, and between materials or services used up, fixed assets and new outputs, according to a standard valuation method. In national accounts, this is especially important because the inputs of one enterprise are the outputs of another, and vice versa; lacking a consistent procedure, double counting would result. In turn, the "grossing and netting" procedure assumes a value theory and a definition of the coverage of production. Once we have that, we can aggregate a multitude of prices to obtain a price for the total value of net output.

== Components of net output ==
The value of an aggregate net output is normally understood to be equal to the sum of:

- gross labour costs (or compensation of employees).
- gross depreciation (or consumption of fixed capital).
- income tax and indirect tax paid by producing enterprises, reduced by government subsidies paid to producing enterprises during the same accounting period.
- gross (pre-tax) profit (or operating surplus) resulting from production.

== Net output and GDP ==
The total net output of resident producers in a national economy is equal to Gross Domestic Product or GDP. Included in this total is the productive activity of government agencies and certain income-generating activities of households.

- Usually the term "net output" is used to refer to the contribution which a particular economic sector (for example, agriculture, manufacturing, business services etc.) makes to total value added or GDP during a quarter or a year.
- The net output of a particular industry should not however be confused with the total value of its outputs, since in reality that total value includes the value-added by production plus the value of inputs used up (i.e. intermediate consumption) in producing the total value of outputs. For example, in making a car, a car factory adds value to the materials and components used to make the car. But the value of the finished car doesn't just include that value-added in production, but also the materials and ancillary operating costs used to make the car. Thus, if we want to know the total sale value of the output of the car factory, the relevant measure is not the "net output" (the value-added), but rather the gross output. If, for example, we wanted to calculate a "unit labour-cost" for the output value of the cars, the appropriate ratio is between labour costs and the gross output value of the cars. It follows that the total new net output value of a whole country, after deducting the value of goods and services used up from the gross expenditure or gross sales revenue, is a different concept from the net output of a particular industry.

== Input-output analysis ==
In input-output analysis, disaggregated data on gross and net outputs of different economic sectors and sub-sectors is used to study the transactions between them. Thus, for example, a sector purchases inputs from several other sectors and sells outputs to several other sectors. By identifying the quantities of inputs and outputs involved, we can estimate what the effect will be of fluctuations in business activity within one sector, or group of sectors on the economy as a whole.

== Criticism ==
As mentioned, the calculation of net output requires a value theory, a way of grossing and netting, and techniques for aggregating the prices of transaction volumes in a consistent way. Obviously, there are many different ways of going about this, but normally a legal framework limits the number of variations possible or permitted (business accounts have to be audited and so on, to guarantee a fair statement of business operations within the law of the land). Nevertheless, the procedure for establishing net output can be contested.

- The valuation standards applied may be contested and differ somewhat between different countries.
- In Marxian economics, the value product is offered as an alternative output measure, reflecting the new value produced by living labor.
- But there is also an ecological criticism that is sometimes made. The argument here is that, in calculating net output, costs and results are only assessed in price terms. Therefore, inputs to production and outputs which are not priced, are excluded in the valuation. Yet those inputs and outputs may nevertheless have an economic or human value, regardless of whether a price could be imputed to them or regardless of whether they can be made an object of trade. If the air is polluted, or depletion of fish stocks in the open seas occurs, the cost of repairing that is not accounted for in the net output of polluters or fishing companies. Sometimes tax levies are therefore imposed. Nowadays the Kyoto Protocol has inspired "emissions trading", where the right to pollute is bought and sold, which some regard as a strictly perverse activity. Others however argue it proves the ability of competitive markets to solve any problem of resource allocation.

== See also ==
- GDP
- GNP
- Gross output
- Input–output model
- Intermediate consumption
- National accounts
- Sectoral output
