= Sectoral output =

Sectoral output for an industry or combination of industries ("sector") is the value of its output sold outside that sector. It is usually calculated as the value of the sector's gross output minus the value of shipments within the sector from one establishment to another.

Value here is measured for a specified time period and usually in units of nominal money. It may be converted to constant units by multiplying by a price index to adjust for changes in prices over time and changes in quality of the goods and services produced. A sectoral output measure is conceptually different from measures of gross output or value-added output. Gross output for the sector consists of sales, or receipts, and other operating income, plus excise taxes paid and net increases in inventories. Value-added measures exclude the value of intermediate inputs such as material, energy, and services, whether from the same industry or others. Thus gross output is larger than sectoral output which is larger than value-added output.

Sectoral output is the measure of output used in "KLEMS" multifactor measures of productivity, which attempt to account for all direct inputs to production: capital services (K), labor services (L), energy (E), materials purchased (M), and services purchased (S) When calculating labor productivity, a value-added measure of output should be used to avoid counting other inputs (like purchased materials) as if they were created by the labor and capital applied within the sector.

The definition of sectoral output has been attributed to Frank M. Gollop.

== See also ==
- GDP
- GNP
- Input–output model
- Intermediate consumption
- National accounts
- Net output
