= Double counting (accounting) =

Accounting error wherein a transaction is counted more than once

Double counting in accounting is an error whereby a transaction is counted more than once, for whatever reason. But in social accounting it also refers to a conceptual problem in social accounting practice, when the attempt is made to estimate the new value added by Gross Output, or the value of total investments.

== What is the problem? ==
In the case of a small individual business or having such utility, it is unlikely that an expenditure of funds, an input or output, or an income from production will be counted twice. If it happens, that's usually just bad accounting (a math error), or else a case of fraud.

But things are more complicated when we aggregate the accounts of many enterprises, households and government agencies ("institutional units" or transactors in social accounting language). Here, a conceptual problem arises.

The basic reason is that the income of one institutional unit is the expenditure of another, and the input of one institutional unit is the output of another.

If therefore we want to measure the total value-added by all institutional units, we need to devise a consistent procedure for grossing and netting the incomes and outlays of all units, within a system of transactors. Lacking such a system, we would end up double counting incomes and expenditures of interacting units, exaggerating the quantity of value-added or investments.

To estimate the annual net output of a country, for example, the cost of goods and services used up is deducted from gross revenue, all flows are valued uniformly, and flows which fall outside the production boundary are excluded.

== Value theory ==
The system of gross and netting actually used, is ultimately based on a value theory, which specifies what may generally count as:

- comparable value (value equivalence)
- value decrease
- value increase
- conserved value
- transferred value
- newly created value

In other words, we cannot relate, group and aggregate prices in different ways without making some value-based assumptions that enable valid comparisons. Without those value assumptions, the aggregates themselves would be meaningless. Thus, when economists focus on market-prices, value assumptions are always in the back of their mind, even if they are not aware of that, and regard value theory as metaphysical.

== Counting units ==
Once the principles of the value theory are established, categories and counting units can be exactly and logically defined, as a basis for mathematical operations to aggregate the flows of incomes and expenditures. All flows can then be allocated to their appropriate category, without counting the same flow several times.

In fact, the value theory applied in national accounts is nowadays strongly influenced by the valuation principles of ordinary business accounts and the prevailing social relations governing economic exchange, often fixed by law. Thus, for example, it is argued that no new value can result from a unilateral transfer of funds, i.e. where funds are provided without anything being provided in return.

The implicit assumption made in national accounts, is that the account at the macro-level must be similar to that at the micro-level. Economic relations are regarded as broadly the same at the micro-level and the macro-level. An individual business buys and uses up inputs and produces outputs for sale; it has costs and revenues. Thus, in social accounting all transactors are treated in a similar way ("as if" they were a business). The accounts can be criticised for being eclectic in some ways, but that is not necessarily a problem; the aim of the exercise is to identify and categorise all flows, and the user can then reaggregate them in different ways.

== Persistent double counting problems ==
However, even if a consistent system of accounting rules is devised that conceptually eliminates double counting, double counting may technically still occur to some extent.

- The first and most obvious reason is that, in actual accounting practice, boundary problems arise, because a flow of expenditures might be interpreted in different ways, from an accounting point of view. Sometimes, it will not be altogether clear which category a flow of expenditure belongs to exactly, it may not "fit" exactly into a category, or, it is technically impossible to separate out different flows in financial data, in such a way that is required by the social accounting system. This may mean that a flow is, in part or as a whole, inadvertently counted twice, because of difficulties with the data sources.
- We might be able to identify an expenditure quite easily, yet this expenditure may not tally with the corresponding income that should exist, insofar as we can identify it (or vice versa). In that case, we have to make some assumptions or imputations based on what we do know, or can observe. Yet, some statistical discrepancies may remain.
- Statisticians may not be able to keep track of fixed equipment or durables when they are resold by a business to another business after use, locally or overseas. So, the same asset can be counted twice or more. In principle, expenditure on used assets is excluded from capital formation, but in practice it is often included.
- Another reason has to do with the complexities of trade, in particular trade in services and international trade. Not only can it be difficult to correctly identify, survey and allocate particular financial incomes and expenditures, but also revaluations of assets occur, creating problems of how to value goods and services as such. At the highest level, due to the expansion of foreign trade, a fraction of local value-added may consist of the local inflation of foreign-produced value-added, simply because imported foreign products are resold locally, at inflated prices, without any corresponding additional local production occurring. This may not necessarily create problems of double counting locally, but if we want to estimate world GDP, we may face double counting problems of some kind.

== See also ==
- National accounts
- United Nations System of National Accounts (UNSNA)
- value added
- GDP
- Real prices and ideal prices
- Intermediate consumption
