= Capital formation =

Concept in macroeconomics, national accounts and financial economics

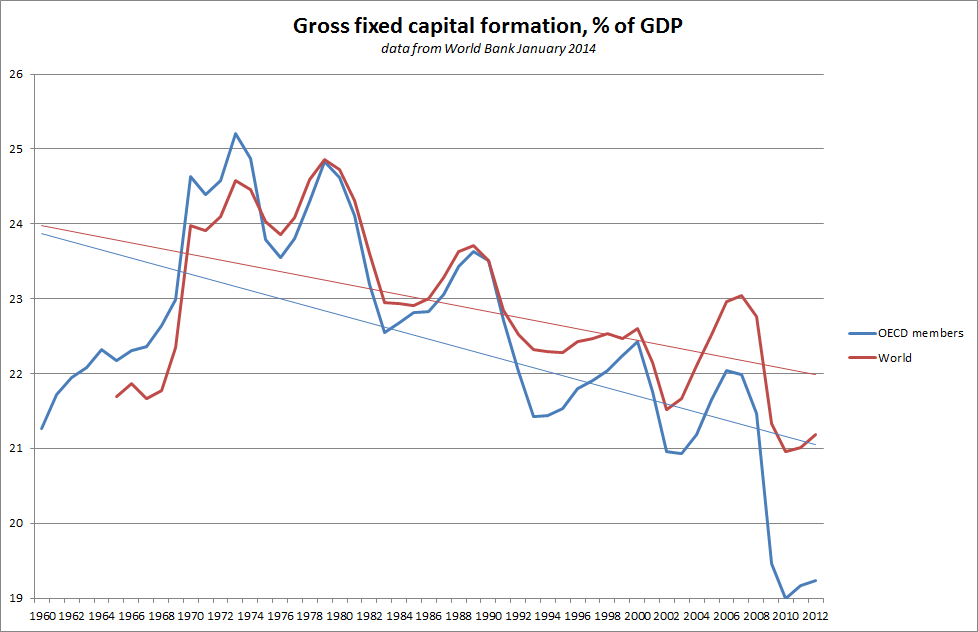
Gross capital formation in % of gross domestic product in world economy

Capital formation is a concept used in macroeconomics, national accounts and financial economics. Occasionally it is also used in corporate accounts. It can be defined in three ways:

- It is a specific statistical concept, also known as net investment, used in national accounts statistics, econometrics and macroeconomics. In that sense, it refers to a measure of the net additions to the (physical) capital stock of a country (or an economic sector) in an accounting interval, or, a measure of the amount by which the total physical capital stock increased during an accounting period. To arrive at this measure, standard valuation principles are used.
- It is used also in economic theory, as a modern general term for capital accumulation, referring to the total "stock of capital" that has been formed, or to the growth of this total capital stock.
- In a much broader or vaguer sense, the term "capital formation" has in more recent times been used in financial economics to refer to savings drives, setting up financial institutions, fiscal measures, public borrowing, development of capital markets, privatization of financial institutions, development of secondary markets. In this usage, it refers to any method for increasing the amount of capital owned or under one's control, or any method in utilising or mobilizing capital resources for investment purposes. Thus, capital could be "formed" in the sense of "being brought together for investment purposes" in many different ways. This broadened meaning is not related to the statistical measurement concept nor to the classical understanding of the concept in economic theory. Instead, it originated in credit-based economic growth during the 1990s and 2000s, which was accompanied by the rapid growth of the financial sector, and consequently the increased use of finance terminology in economic discussions.

== Use in national accounts statistics ==
In the national accounts (e.g., in the United Nations System of National Accounts and the European System of Accounts) gross capital formation is the total value of the gross fixed capital formation (GFCF), plus net changes in inventories, plus net acquisitions less disposals of valuables for a unit or sector.

"Total capital formation" in national accounting equals net fixed capital investment, plus the increase in the value of inventories held, plus (net) lending to foreign countries, during an accounting period (a year or a quarter). Capital is said to be "formed" when savings are utilized for investment purposes, often investment in production.

In the US, statistical measures for capital formation were pioneered by Simon Kuznets in the 1930s and 1940s, and from the 1950s onwards the standard accounting system devised under the auspices of the United Nations to measure capital flows was adopted officially by the governments of most countries. International bodies such as the International Monetary Fund (IMF) and the World Bank have been influential in revising the system.

== Different interpretations ==
The use of the terms "capital formation" and "investment" can be somewhat confusing, partly because the concept of capital itself can be understood in different ways.

- Firstly, capital formation is frequently thought of as a measure of total "investment", in the sense of that portion of capital actually used for investment purposes and not held as savings or consumed. But in fact, in national accounts, the concept of gross capital formation refers only to the accounting value of the "additions of non-financial produced assets to the capital stock less the disposals of these assets". "Investment" is a broader concept that includes investment in all kinds of capital assets, whether physical property or financial assets. In its statistical meaning, capital formation does not include financial assets such as stocks and securities.
- Secondly, capital formation may be used synonymously with the notion of capital accumulation in the sense of a reinvestment of profits into capital assets. But "capital accumulation" is not normally an accounting concept in modern accounts (although it is sometimes used by the IMF and the United Nations Conference on Trade and Development), and contains the ambiguity that an amassment of wealth could occur either through a redistribution of capital assets from one person or institution to another, or through a net addition to the total stock of capital in existence. As regards capital accumulation, it can flourish, so that some people become wealthier, although society as a whole becomes poorer, and the net capital formation decreases. In other words, the gain could be a net total gain, or a gain at the expense of loss by others that cancels out (or more than cancels out) the gain in aggregate.
- Thirdly, gross capital formation is often used synonymously with gross fixed capital formation but strictly speaking this is an error because gross capital formation refers to more net asset gains than just fixed capital (it also includes net gains in inventory stock levels and the balance of funds lent abroad).

Capital formation measures were originally designed to provide a picture of investment and growth of the "real economy" in which goods and services are produced using tangible capital assets. The measures were intended to identify changes in the growth of physical wealth across time. However, the international growth of the financial sector has created many structural changes in the way that business investments occur, and in the way capital finance is really organized. This not only affects the definition of the measures, but also how economists interpret capital formation. The most recent alterations in national accounts standards mean that capital measures and many other measures are no longer fully comparable with the data of the past, except where the old data series have been revised to align them with the new concepts and definitions. US government statisticians have admitted frankly that "Unfortunately, the finance sector is one of the more poorly measured sectors in national accounts". The main reason is that national accounts were at first primarily designed to capture changes in tangible physical wealth, not financial wealth (in the form of financial claims).

== Gross and net capital formation ==
In economic statistics and accounts, capital formation can be valued gross, i.e., before deduction of consumption of fixed capital (or "depreciation"), or net, i.e., after deduction of "depreciation" write-offs.

- The gross valuation method views "depreciation" as a portion of the new income or wealth earned or created by the enterprise, and hence as part of the formation of new capital by the enterprise.
- The net valuation method views "depreciation" as the compensation for the cost of replacing fixed equipment used up or worn out, which must be deducted from the total investment volume to obtain a measure of the "real" value of investments; the depreciation write-off compensates and cancels out the loss in capital value of assets used due to wear & tear, obsolescence, etc.

Because of government tax-incentives and valuation issues, depreciation charged by businesses is rarely a true reflection of the loss in value of their capital stock. Hence, statisticians often revalue actual depreciation charges according to data about asset values and average service lives of assets, in order to obtain measures of true "economic depreciation".

== Technical measurement issues ==
Capital formation is notoriously difficult to measure statistically, mainly because of the valuation problems involved in establishing what the value of capital assets is. When a fixed asset or inventory is bought, it may be reasonably clear what its market value is, namely the purchaser's price. But as soon as it is bought, its value may change, and it may change even before it is put to use. Things often become more complicated to measure when a new fixed asset is acquired within some kind of lease agreement. Finally, the rate at which the value of the fixed asset depreciates will affect the gross and net valuation of the asset, yet different methods are typically used to value what assets are worth and how fast they depreciate. Capital assets can for instance be valued at:

- historic cost (acquisition cost)
- current replacement cost
- current sale or resale value
- average market value
- business value, assuming a certain profit yield
- value for tax purposes,
- value for insurance purposes
- purchasing power parity value
- scrap value.

A business owner may in fact not even know what his business is "worth" as a going concern, in terms of its current market value. The "book value" of a capital stock may differ greatly from its "market value", and another figure may apply for taxation purposes. The value of capital assets may also be overstated or understated using various legal constructions. For any significant business, how assets are valued makes a big difference to its earnings and thus the correct statement of asset values is a perpetually controversial subject.

During an accounting period, additions may be made to capital assets (including those that disproportionately increase the value of the capital stock) and capital assets are also disposed of; at the same time, physical assets also incur depreciation or Consumption of fixed capital. Also, price inflation may affect the value of the capital stock.

In national accounts, there are additional problems:

- The sales/purchases of one enterprise can be the investment of another enterprise. Therefore, to obtain a measure of the total net capital formation, a system of grossing and netting of capital flows is required. Without this, double counting would occur.
- Capital expenditure must be distinguished from intermediate expenditure and other operating expenditure, but the boundaries are sometimes difficult to draw.
- There exists nowadays a large market in second-hand (used) assets. In principle, statistical measures of gross fixed capital formation are supposed to refer to the net additions of newly produced fixed assets, which enlarge the total stock of fixed capital in the economy. But if a substantial trade occurs in fixed assets resold from one enterprise or one country to another, it may become difficult to know what the real net addition to the stock of fixed capital of a country actually is. A precise distinction between "new" and "used" assets becomes more difficult to draw. How to value used assets and their depreciation consistently becomes more problematic.

The general trend in accounting standards is for assets to be valued increasingly at "current market value", but this valuation is by no means absolutely clear and uncontroversial. It might be understood to mean the price of the asset if it was sold at a balance date, or the current replacement cost of the asset, or the average price of the asset type in the market at a certain date, etc.

== Perpetual Inventory Method ==
A method often used in econometrics to estimate the value of the physical capital stock of an industrial sector or the whole economy is the so-called Perpetual Inventory Method (PIM). Starting off from a benchmark stock value for capital held, and expressing all values in constant dollars using a price index, known additions to the stock are added, and known disposals as well as depreciation are subtracted year by year (or quarter by quarter). Thus, an historical data series is obtained for the growth of the capital stock over a period of time. In so doing, assumptions are made about the real rate of price inflation, realistic depreciation rates, average service lives of physical capital assets, and so on. The PIM stock values can be compared with various other related economic variables and trends, and adjusted further to obtain the most accurate and credible valuation

== Controversy ==
According to one popular kind of macro-economic definition in textbooks, capital formation refers to "the transfer of savings from households and governments to the business sector, resulting in increased output and economic expansion" (see Circular flow of income). The idea here is that individuals and governments save money, and then invest that money in the private sector, which produces more wealth with it. This definition is however inaccurate on two counts:

- Firstly, many larger corporations engage in corporate self-financing, i.e., financing from their own reserves and undistributed profits, or through loans from (or share issues bought by) other corporations. In other words, the textbook definition ignores that the largest source of investment capital consists of financial institutions, not individuals or households or governments. Admittedly, financial institutions are, "in the last instance", mostly owned by individuals, but those individuals have little control over this transfer of funds, nor do they accomplish the transfer themselves. Few individuals can say they "own" a corporation, any more than individuals "own" the public sector. James M. Poterba (1987) found that changes in corporate saving are only partly offset (between 25% and 50%) by changes in household saving in the United States. Social accountants Richard Ruggles and Nancy D. Ruggles established for the USA that "almost all financial savings done by households is used to pay for household capital formation - particularly, housing and consumer durables. On net, the household sector channels almost no financial savings to the enterprise sector. Conversely, almost all the capital formation done by enterprises is financed through enterprise savings - particularly, undistributed gross profits."
- Secondly, the transfer of funds to corporations may not result in increased output or economic expansion at all; given excess capacity, a low rate of return and/or lacklustre demand, corporations may not in fact invest those funds to expand output, and engage in asset speculation instead, to obtain property income that boosts shareholder returns. To illustrate, New Zealand's Finance Minister Michael Cullen stated that "My sense is that there are definite gains to be made, both economic and social, in increasing the savings level of New Zealanders and in encouraging diversification in assets away from the residential property market." This idea is based on a flawed understanding of capital formation, ignoring the real issue - which is that the flow of mortgage repayments by households to financial institutions is not being used to expand output and employment on a scale that could repay escalating private sector debts. In reality, more and more local income and assets are appropriated by foreign share-holders and creditors in North America, Europe, Australia and Japan . In December 2012, managed funds statistics compiled by the NZ Reserve Bank indicated that New Zealanders have 49.8% of their KiwiSaver money invested overseas. These managed fund figures include capital contributions, capital gains and losses and dividends and interest received.

The concept of "household saving" must itself also be looked at critically, since a lot of this "saving" in reality consists precisely of investing in housing, which, given low interest rates and rising real estate prices, yields a better return than if you kept your money in the bank (or, in some cases, if you invested in shares). In other words, a mortgage from a bank can effectively function as a "savings scheme" although officially it is not regarded as "savings".

== Example of capital estimates ==
In the 2005 Analytical Perspectives document, an annex to the US Budget (Table 12-4: National Wealth, p. 201), an annual estimate is provided for the value of total tangible capital assets of the US, which doubled since 1980 (stated in trillions of dollars, at September 30, 2003):

Publicly owned physical assets:

 Structures and equipment . . . . . .  $5.6
 Federally owned or financed  . . .    $2.2
 Federally owned  . . . . . . . . . . .$1.0
 Grants to state and local govt . .  . $1.0
 Funded by state and local govt . . .  $3.3
 Other federal assets . . . . . . . .  $1.4

Subtotal (1). . . . . . . . . . . . . . . . . . . . . . . . . . . . . . . . . $6.9 trillion

Privately owned physical assets:

   Reproducible assets . . . . . . . . $28.7
   Residential structures. . . . . . . $12.4
   Nonresidential plant & equipment  . $11.8
   Inventories . . . . . . . . . . . . $1.5
   Consumer durables . . . . . . . . . $3.1
   Land  . . . . . . . . . . . . . . . $10.2

Subtotal (2). . . . . . . . . . . . . . . . . . . . . . . . . . . . . . . $38.9 trillion

Education capital:

  federally financed . . . . . . . . . $1.4
  financed from other sources  . . . . $44.0

Subtotal (3) . . . . . . . . . . . . . . . . . . .. . . . . . . . . . . . . $45.4 trillion

Research and development capital:

  federally financed R&D  . . . . . . . $1.1
  R&D financed from other sources   . . $1.7

Subtotal (4). . . . . . . . . . . . . . . . . . . . . . . . . . .. . . . .$2.9 trillion

TOTAL ASSETS . . . . . . . . . . . . . . . . . . . . . . . . . . . . $94.1 trillion

Net claims of foreigners on US . . . . . . . . . . . . . . . . . $4.2 trillion

Net wealth . . . . . . . . . . . . . . . . . . . . . . . . . . . . .. .$89.9 trillion

(Note: these data obviously do not include financial assets, such as estimated by the McKinsey Quarterly, only "tangible" assets in US territory. The total value of marketable financial assets in the USA was estimated in 2007 at about US$46 trillion . This total obviously does not include assets, deposits and reserves that are not traded. The data series on national wealth provided in the budget annex were discontinued by the administration of President Barack Obama).

== See also ==
- Capital (economics)
- Capital accumulation
- Constant capital
- Consumption of fixed capital
- Debt
- Double counting (accounting)
- Equity sharing
- Factoring (finance)
- Financial capital
- Fixed capital
- Gross fixed capital formation
- Human capital
- Initial public offering
- Investment (macroeconomics)
- Investment-specific technological progress
- Privately held company
- Public company
- Reverse takeover (also known as a back door listing or reverse merger)
- Social capital
- Special-purpose acquisition company (SPAC)
