= Compensation of employees =

Compensation of employees (CE) is a statistical term used in national accounts, balance of payments statistics and sometimes in corporate accounts as well. It refers basically to the total gross (pre-tax) wages paid by employers to employees for work done in an accounting period, such as a quarter or a year.

However, in reality, the aggregate includes more than just gross wages, at least in national accounts and balance of payments statistics. The reason is that in these accounts, CE is defined as "the total remuneration, in cash or in kind, payable by an enterprise to an employee in return for work done by the latter during the accounting period". It represents effectively a total labour cost to an employer, paid from the gross revenues or the capital of an enterprise.

Compensation of employees is accounted for on an accrual basis; i.e., it is measured by the value of the remuneration in cash or in kind which an employee becomes entitled to receive from an employer in respect of work done, during the relevant accounting period – whether paid in advance, simultaneously, or in arrears of the work itself. This contrasts with other inputs to production, which are to be valued at the point when they are actually used.

== Usage ==
For statistical purposes, the relationship of employer to employee exists, when there is an agreement, formal or informal, between an enterprise and a person, normally entered into voluntarily by both parties, whereby the person works for the enterprise, in return for remuneration in cash or in kind. The remuneration is normally based on either the time spent at work, or some other objective indicator of the amount of work done.

For social accounting purposes, CE is considered a component of the value of net output or value added (as factor income). The aim is not to measure income actually received by workers, but the value which labour contributes to net output along with other factors of production. The underlying idea is that the value of net output equals the factor incomes that generate it. For this reason, some types of remuneration received by employees are either included or excluded, because they are regarded as either related or unrelated to production or to the value of new output.

In different countries, what is actually included and excluded in CE may differ somewhat. The reason is that the way in which workers are compensated for their labour may be somewhat different in different types of economies. For example, in some countries workers get substantial payments "in kind", in others they don't. Systems of social insurance also differ between countries, and some countries have little social insurance. One has to keep this in mind when comparing CE magnitudes for different countries.

A compensation system has to be aligned to the mission, vision, business strategy and organizational structure of a company to design the compensation plan in an efficient way to can achieve the goals. Businesses within the same organization will have different competitive conditions, acquire different business strategies, and design compensation strategies. A general compensation plan consists of three components: a base compensation, rewarding incentives, and indirect compensation in form of benefits.

== Inclusions in the statistical concept ==
The United Nations System of National Accounts (UNSNA) conceptually includes the following items in the statistical aggregate:

- gross wages and salaries earned by employees and payable in cash.
- cash allowances, overtime pay, bonuses, commissions, tips, and gratuities if paid by the employer to the employee.
- remuneration in kind paid by the employer to the employee valued at purchaser's prices, including meals and drinks, personal accommodation, uniforms worn outside of the workplace, vehicles or other durables provided for the personal use of employees, free personal travel, free personal fuel, recreational facilities, transport and parking subsidies, and creches for the children of employees.
- real or imputed social contributions and income taxes to government payable by the employee in respect of employment.
- the value of the social contributions in respect of labor hired, which are paid by employers – these may be actual social contributions payable by employers to social security schemes or to private funded social insurance schemes for employees; or imputed social contributions by employers providing unfunded social benefits.
- income of students from paid work, including the value they contribute through work for an educational institution.
- income received by shareholders who are also employees of the corporation, and who receive paid remuneration (e.g. stock options) other than dividends.
- income by outworkers who are paid by an enterprise for work done.
- the value of the interest foregone by employers when they provide loans to employees at reduced, or even zero rates of interest for purposes of buying houses, furniture or other goods or services.

== Exclusions from the statistical concept ==
UNSNA excludes the following items in the statistical aggregate:

- the value of unpaid voluntary work.
- income from self-employment (often included in operating surplus or gross profit).
- income of the unemployed.
- income of those not in the labor force.
- the value of work by unpaid family workers.
- property income as contrasted with labour income.
- taxes payable by the employer to the government in respect of the total gross salary bill.
- income of outworkers which consists of entitlements to products or profits of an enterprise. When the outworker is an own-account worker, the payment from the enterprise to the outworker is treated as a purchase of intermediate goods or services (however, self-employed income is not always treated in the same way by different countries).
- social benefits paid by government to employees (not directly related to the work they do).
- expenditures made by employees in order to enable them to take up their jobs or to carry out their work, including reimbursement of travel, removal or related expenses made by employees when they take up new jobs or are required by their employers to move elsewhere.
- expenditures by employees on tools, equipment, special clothing or other items that are needed exclusively, or primarily, to enable them to carry out their work (usually regarded as Intermediate consumption).
- employee social benefits paid by employers in the form of children's, spouse's, family, education or other allowances in respect of dependents.
- payments made at full, or reduced, wage or salary rates to workers absent from work, because of illness, accidental injury, maternity leave, etc.

== See also ==
- Abstract labour and concrete labour
- Employee compensation in the United States
- Gross output
- Intermediate consumption
- Labor power
- List of countries by average wage
- National accounts
- NIPA
- Productive and unproductive labour
- Productivity
- United Nations System of National Accounts (UNSNA)
- Value added
- Value product
- Wage share
- Wages
