= Intermediate good =

Goods used to create other goods

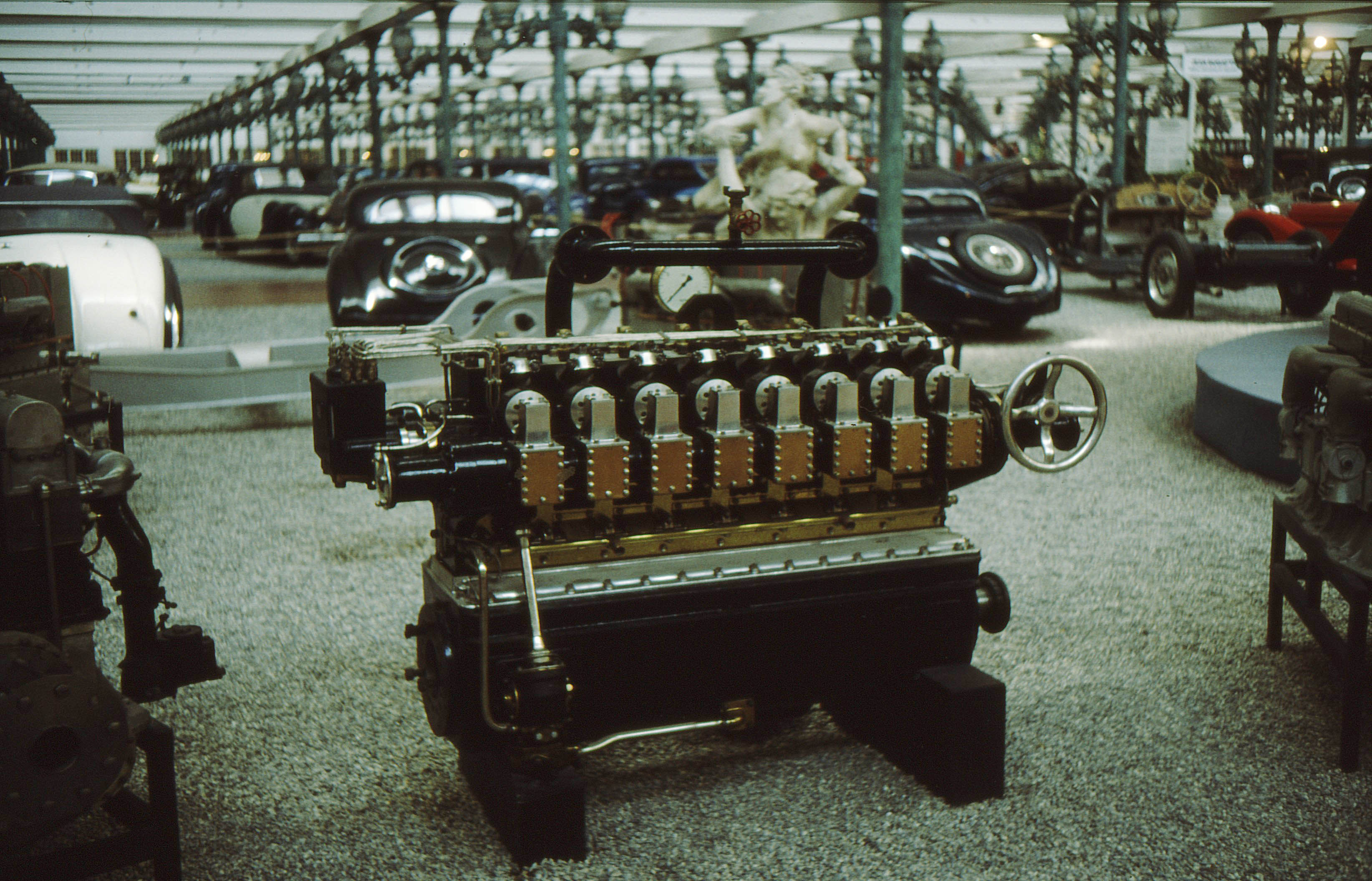
An automobile engine is an example of an intermediate good, and is used in the production of the final good, the assembled automobile.

Intermediate goods, producer goods, or semi-finished products are goods used as inputs in the production of other goods, including final goods. A firm may make and then use intermediate goods, or make and then sell, or buy then use them. In the production process, intermediate goods either become part of the final product, or are changed beyond recognition in the process. This means intermediate goods are resold among industries.

Intermediate goods are not counted in a country's GDP, as that would mean double counting, because the value of the intermediate good is included in the value of the final good.

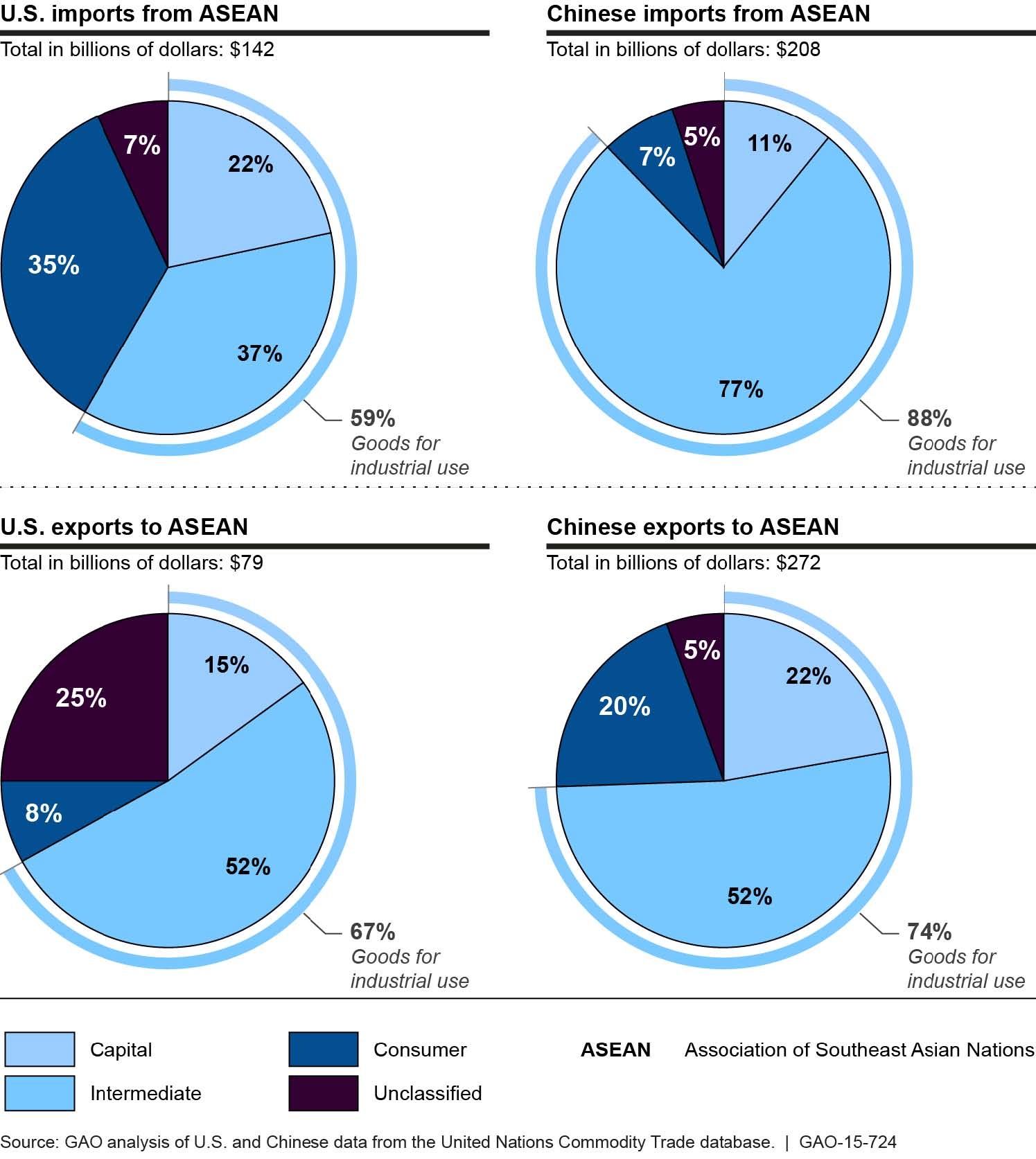
US and Chinese trade in goods with ASEAN countries, by use, 2014

The value-added method can be used to calculate the amount of intermediate goods incorporated into GDP. This approach counts every phase of processing included in production of final goods.

Characterization of intermediate goods as physical goods can be misleading, since, in advanced economies, about half of the value of intermediate inputs consist of services.

Intermediate goods generally can be made and used in three different ways. First, a company can make and use its own intermediate goods. Second, a company can manufacture intermediate goods and sell them to others. Third, a company can buy intermediate goods to produce either secondary intermediate goods or final goods.

== Examples ==
- Sugar – sugar is used as a final good (when it is sold as sugar in the supermarket) or as an input (when it is used as an ingredient in other food products)
- Steel – a material used in the production of many other goods, such as vehicles.
- Car engines - Some firms make and use their own, others buy them from other producers as an intermediate good, for use in their own cars.
- Paint, plywood, pipe and tube, and ancillary parts.
- Wood - wood is used in multiple purposes for construction of building or production of furniture
- Glass - glass can be used to make dishes, cups, bottles or windows
- Salt - salt is used in almost all food production and many chemical processes
- Silver and gold - silver and gold can be used to make jewelry, cutlery or electronics, or for ornamentation (even on food)
- An interesting example is the use of chlorine in the production of polyurethane, which contains no chlorine. Rock salt is electrolyzed to produce chlorine, which is reacted with carbon monoxide to give phosgene. Phosgene, a chlorine compound, and a diamine are then reacted to produce a diisocyanate and hydrochloric acid that is neutralized in situ. The chlorine is removed as chloride salt waste. The diisocyanate reacts with a diol to produce polyurethane, which contains no chlorine. Chlorine is used because chlorine is electronegative enough to produce an isocyanate, but does not become a part of the product; it lowers the atom economy.

== See also ==
- Intermediate consumption
- Prefabrication
