= NNW =

NNW may refer to:

- Neural network, an interconnected group of neurons or artificial neurons
- North-northwest or Nor-norwest, a compass direction (one of the eight "half-winds")
- NetNewsWire desktop news aggregator for Mac OS X
- National Nursing Week, observed in the U.S. and Canada, incorporating International Nurses Day
- Net national welfare, another name for Net economic welfare, a proposed national income measure
- New native woodland, areas of reforestation created in the UK by the Woodland Trust
