= Factor income =

Flow of income from factors of production

Factor income (also called primary income and earned income) is the flow of income that is derived from the factors of production, i.e., the general inputs required to produce goods and services. Factor income on the use of land is called rent, income generated from labor is called wages, and income generated from capital is divided between profit for equity owner and interest for creditor. The total amount of factor income received by the residents of a country is referred to as the national income, while factor income and current transfers together are referred to as disposable income.

In contemporary national accounting, Indirect taxes minus subsidies are treated like factor income despite not meeting the definition. In earlier system like the 1953 SNA defined to concept of GDP: the sum of all factor income called GDP at factor cost, and the sum of all expenditure called GDP at market price. (GDP at market price = GDP at factor cost + Indirect taxes minus subsidies). Factor cost measured have being abandoned by the SNA.

Factor income is used to analyze macroeconomic situations and to find out the difference between gross domestic product and gross national income: difference between the total value of the goods and services produced in a country and the income of the citizens of the country.

The applicability of the concept of factor income can be seen in developing countries where large portion of their income is from foreign direct investment which creates a massive gap between gross domestic product (GDP) and gross national income (GNI), with GDP being higher than GNI.
