= Consumption of fixed capital =

Accounting term for depreciation of fixed assets

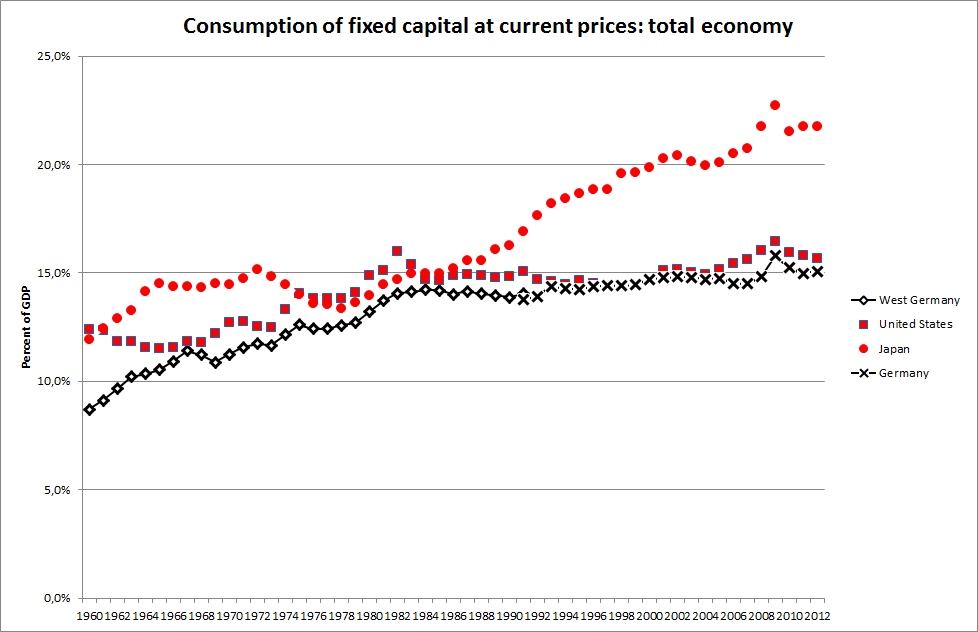
Consumption of fixed capital in percent of GDP, Germany, Japan, United States, computed from data of Ameco data base

Consumption of fixed capital (CFC) is a term used in business accounts, tax assessments and national accounts for depreciation of fixed assets. CFC is used in preference to "depreciation" to emphasize that fixed capital is used up in the process of generating new output, and because unlike depreciation it is not valued at historic cost but at current market value (so-called "economic depreciation"); CFC may also include other expenses incurred in using or installing fixed assets beyond actual depreciation charges. Normally the term applies only to producing enterprises, but sometimes it applies also to real estate assets.

CFC refers to a depreciation charge (or "write-off") against the gross income of a producing enterprise, which reflects the decline in value of fixed capital being operated with. Fixed assets will decline in value after they are purchased for use in production, due to wear and tear, changed market valuation and possibly market obsolescence. Thus, CFC represents a compensation for the loss of value of fixed assets to an enterprise.

According to the 2008 manual of the United Nations System of National Accounts,

"Consumption of fixed capital is the decline, during the course of the accounting period, in the current value of the stock of fixed assets owned and used by a producer as a result of physical deterioration, normal obsolescence or normal accidental damage. The term depreciation is often used in place of consumption of fixed capital but it is avoided in the SNA because in commercial accounting the term depreciation is often used in the context of writing off historic costs whereas in the SNA consumption of fixed capital is dependent on the current value of the asset." — UNSNA 2008, section H., p. 123 )

CFC tends to increase as the asset gets older, even if the efficiency and rental remain constant to the end. The larger the depreciation write-off, the larger the gross income of a business. Consequently, business owners consider this accounting entry as very important; after all, it affects both their income, and their ability to invest.

== Capital Consumption Allowance ==
The Capital Consumption Allowance (CCA) is the portion of the gross domestic product (GDP) which is due to depreciation. The Capital Consumption Allowance measures the amount of expenditure that a country needs to undertake in order to maintain, as opposed to grow, its productivity. The CCA can be thought of as representing the wear-and-tear on the country's physical capital, together with the investment needed to maintain the level of human capital (e.g. to educate the workers needed to replace retirees).

=== Calculation ===
Gross domestic product (GDP) equals net domestic product (NDP) + CCA (Capital Consumption Allowance):

$$GDP = NDP + CCA.$$

== Valuation ==
How much the depreciation charge actually will be, depends mainly on the depreciation rates which enterprises are officially permitted to charge for tax purposes (usually fixed by law), and on how fixed assets themselves are valued for accounting purposes. This makes the assessment of CFC quite complex, because fixed assets may be valued for instance at:

- historic (acquisition) cost
- operating value (as part of a "going concern")
- accrual value
- current average sale-value in the market
- current replacement cost
- cash value
- economic value
- insured value
- scrap value
- deflated value (allowing for price inflation)

By how much then, do fixed assets used in production truly decline in value, within an accounting period? How should they be valued? This can be arguable and very difficult to answer, and in practice, various conventions are adopted by accountants and auditors within the framework of legal rules and economic theory.

In addition, the depreciation schedules imposed by tax departments may differ from the actual depreciation of business assets at market rates. Often, governments permit depreciation write-offs higher than true depreciation, to provide an incentive to enterprises for new investment. But this is not always the case; the tax rate might sometimes be lower than the real market-based rate. Furthermore, businesses might engage in creative accounting and deliberately state their assets and liabilities held at a balance date, or interpret the figures in some other way, to increase the amount of depreciation write-offs, and thus boost their income (how this is done will depend a lot on tax law).

For all these reasons, economists distinguish between different kinds of depreciation rates, arguing that the "true" consumption of fixed capital is really the economic depreciation, assessed by relating financial data to mathematical models, to arrive at a figure that "seems credible". The economic depreciation rate is based on observations of the average selling prices of assets at different ages. The economic depreciation rate is therefore a market-based depreciation rate, i.e. it is based on what an asset of a given age would currently sell for in the market.

== In national accounts ==
In national accounts, CFC is a component of value added or Gross Domestic Product, and regarded as a cost of production. It is defined in general terms as the decline, in an accounting period, of the current value of the stock of fixed assets owned and used by a producer as a result of physical deterioration, normal obsolescence or normal accidental damage.

The UNSNA manual notes that "The consumption of fixed capital is one of the most important elements in the System... It may account for 10 per cent or more of total GDP." CFC is defined "in a way that is theoretically appropriate and relevant for purposes of economic analysis". Its value may therefore diverge considerably from depreciation actually recorded in business accounts, or as allowed for taxation purposes, especially if there is price inflation.

In principle, CFC is calculated using the actual or estimated prices and rentals of fixed assets prevailing at the time the production takes place, and not at the times fixed assets were originally acquired. The "historic costs" of fixed assets, i.e., the prices originally paid for them, may become quite irrelevant for the calculation of consumption of fixed capital, if prices change sufficiently over time.

Unlike depreciation as calculated in business accounts, CFC in national accounts is, in principle, not a method of allocating the costs of past expenditures on fixed assets over subsequent accounting periods. Rather, fixed assets at a given moment in time are valued according to the remaining benefits derived from their use.

Depreciation charges in business accounts are adjusted in national accounts from historic costs to current prices, in conjunction with estimates of the capital stock.

In addition to gross measures of output and income such as GDP and gross national income (GNI), National Accounts include net measures such as net domestic product (NDP) and net national income (NNI), derived by deducting CFC from the corresponding gross measure.

GDP is the most accurate measure of aggregate economic activity. However, NNI represents the income actually available to finance consumption and new investment (excluding the replacement of capital consumed in production). It is therefore a more accurate measure of economic welfare.

=== Inclusions ===
In UNSNA, included are:

- all tangible and intangible fixed assets owned by producers.
- fixed assets constructed to improve land, such as drainage systems, dykes, or breakwaters or on assets which are constructed on or through land - roads, railway tracks, tunnels, dams, etc.
- Losses of fixed assets due to normal accidental damage, i.e. damage caused to assets used in production resulting from their exposure to the risk of fires, storms, accidents due to human errors, etc.
- interest costs incurred in acquiring fixed assets, which may consist either of actual interest paid on borrowed funds, or the loss of interest incurred as a result of investing own funds in the purchase of the fixed asset, instead of a financial asset. Whether owned or rented, the full cost of using the fixed asset in production is thus measured by the actual or imputed rental on the asset, and not by depreciation alone. If the fixed asset is actually rented under an operating lease or similar contract, the rental is recorded under Intermediate consumption as the purchase of a service produced by the lessor. If the user and the owner are one and the same unit, CFC is considered to represent only part of the cost of using the asset.
- Certain insurance premiums related to the acquisition or maintenance of fixed assets.

=== Exclusions ===
In UNSNA, excluded are:

- the value of fixed assets destroyed by acts of war, or exceptional events such as major natural disasters, earthquakes, volcanic eruptions, tsunami, exceptionally severe hurricanes, etc. (e.g. Hurricane Katrina) which occur very infrequently.
- valuables (precious metals, precious stones, etc.)
- the depletion or degradation of non-produced assets such as land, mineral or other deposits, or coal, oil, or natural gas.
- losses due to unexpected technological developments that may significantly shorten the service lives of a group of existing fixed assets.

=== Gross and net capital stocks ===
In UNSNA, the value at current prices of the gross capital stock is obtained, by using price indices for fixed assets at current replacement cost, irrespective of the age of the assets.

The net, or written-down value of a fixed capital asset is equal to its current replacement cost, less CFC accrued up to that point in time.

=== Criticism ===
The main criticism, made of the way national accounts value CFC, is that in trying to arrive at an "economic" concept and magnitude of depreciation, they arrive at figures which are at variance with standard accounting practices. The business income cited in the social account is not the business income reported in profit and loss statements, but an economic income measure which is derived from accounting business income. Thus, the criticism centres both on the valuation principles used, and the additional items included in the aggregate, which are not directly related to depreciation charges in business accounts. Yet the whole computation affects the aggregate profit figures provided. Because of the way CFC is calculated, aggregate profit (or operating surplus the residual item in the product account) is likely to be differ from the accounting profit calculation, which is usually derived from tax data.

In Marxian economics, the official concept of CFC is also disputed, because it is argued that CFC really should refer to the value transferred by living labor from fixed assets to new output. Consequently, operating expenditures associated with fixed assets other than depreciation should be regarded as either as circulating constant capital, faux frais of production or surplus value, depending on the case. Furthermore, the measured difference between economic depreciation and actual depreciation charges will either add or lower the magnitude of total surplus value.

== See also ==
- Capital Consumption Allowance
- Depreciation
- Fixed capital
- Gross output
- Intermediate consumption
- United Nations System of National Accounts (UNSNA)
- Value added
- Value product
