= Net economic welfare =

Net Economic Welfare is a proposed national income measure that attempts to put a value on the costs of pollution, crime, congestion, and other 'negative' spinoffs, in order to find a better measure of true national income. To date, it has not been widely adopted.

Net Economic Welfare also means - Adjusted measure of total national output, including only the consumption and investment items that contribute directly to economic well-being. Calculated as additions to gross national product (GNP), including the value of leisure and the underground economy, and deductions such as environmental damage. It is also known as net economic welfare (NEW).
