= Gross national income in the European Union =

Overview of EU income

Gross national income at market prices in the European Union of 27 Member States (GNI) amounted to EUR 44,778 per inhabitant in 2020.

In 2007, the highest per capita GNI measured in purchasing power standards (PPS) was recorded for Luxembourg (more than twice of the EU-27 average) and the lowest was recorded for Bulgaria (less than half of the EU-27 average). Estonia, Ireland, Latvia and Lithuania were the Member States that in 2009 suffered the most from the recession experiencing declines of more than 10% in GNI (measured in PPS) over 2008.

== Definition of GNI ==
GNI is defined in accordance with the European system of national and regional accounts. GNI represents total primary income receivable by resident institutional units: compensation of employees, taxes on production and imports less subsidies, property income (interest, dividends and reinvested earnings from foreign direct investment receivable less payable), gross operating surplus and gross mixed income. It corresponds to the better known gross domestic product (GDP) minus primary income payable by resident units to non-resident units, plus primary income receivable by resident units from the rest of the world. Technically speaking, the GNI is a balancing item of the allocation of primary income account in the sequence of accounts for the total economy. Loosely speaking, it is the sum of domestic and foreign income earned by the resident population of a country. It is worth noting that GNI is income from productive activities excluding any capital gains and losses (also known as "holding gains and losses") resulting from price changes of fixed or financial assets (for example: price changes on the stock market have no direct impact on GNI).

Net national income differs from gross national income by the amount of consumption of fixed capital deducted.

== GNI and the EU budget ==
More than three quarters of the revenue of the budget of the European Union is based on the member states' contributions calculated as a uniform percentage rate applied to the sum of all the member states' GNIs. The GNI-based own resource is governed by Council Regulation (EC, Euratom) 1287/2003 of 15 July 2003 on the harmonisation of gross national income at market prices (the GNI regulation), which lays downs the definition and calculation of GNI. The GNI regulation also specifies the provisions for the notification of the data and related methodological information by the member states to the European Commission (Eurostat). Furthermore, the GNI regulation establishes the procedures to facilitate the verification of the GNI base for own resources, and, where necessary, the improvement of the comparability, reliability and exhaustiveness of the member states' GNI estimates. Eurostat validates the data calculated and transmitted by the member states. It is responsible for monitoring GNI for own resource purposes, for assessing the quality of the calculations and for verifying compliance with ESA 95 rules and related European law. Eurostat also calculates the European aggregates of GNI based on the national results transmitted by the member states.

== See also ==
- List of European countries by GNI (nominal) per capita
- List of European countries by GNI (PPP) per capita
- Measures of national income and output

== E-learning ==
- Statistics Finland: e-learning course on national accounts
