= Intermediate consumption =

Concept in economics

Intermediate consumption (also called intermediate expenditure) is an economic concept used in national accounts, such as the United Nations System of National Accounts (UNSNA), the US National Income and Product Accounts (NIPA) and the European System of Accounts (ESA).

Conceptually, the aggregate "intermediate consumption" is equal to the amount of the difference between gross output (roughly, the total sales value) and net output (gross value added or GDP). In the US economy, total intermediate consumption represents about 45% of gross output. The services component in intermediate consumption has grown strongly in the US, from about 30% in the 1980s to more than 40% today.

Thus, intermediate consumption is an accounting flow which consists of the total monetary value of goods and services consumed or used up as inputs in production by enterprises, including raw materials, services and various other operating expenses.

Because this value must be subtracted from gross output to arrive at GDP, how it is exactly defined and estimated will importantly affect the size of the GDP estimate.

Intermediate goods or services used in production can be either changed in form (e.g. bulk sugar) or completely used up (e.g. electric power).

Intermediate consumption (unlike fixed assets) is not normally classified in national accounts by type of good or service, because the accounts will show net output by sector of activity. However, sometimes more detail is available in sectoral accounts of income & outlay (e.g. manufacturing), and from input-output tables showing the value of transactions between economic sectors.

== Exclusions ==
Excluded from intermediate consumption in the SNA system are:

- The value of the depreciation of fixed assets.
- valuables bought by enterprises such as works of art, precious metals and stones, ornaments and jewellery.
- Major renovations, reconstructions, or enlargements of existing fixed assets enhancing their efficiency or capacity, or prolonging their expected working lives.
- Military weapons such as rockets, missiles and their warheads which are actually used in fighting, and military machinery and equipment of the same type as that used by civil establishments for non-military purposes (the 2008 UNSNA revision changes the definitions somewhat).
- Collective services provided by the public sector (the provision of transport facilities, security, etc.).
- Expenditures on mineral exploration.
- Social transfers provided by government to households.

== Inclusions ==
Included in intermediate consumption in the SNA system are:

- Operating expenses such as the rentals paid on the use of fixed assets leased, and also fees, commissions, royalties, etc., payable under licensing arrangements.
- The value of goods or services used as inputs into ancillary activities such as purchasing, sales, marketing, accounting, data processing, transportation, storage, maintenance, security, etc.
- The ordinary, regular maintenance and repair of fixed assets used in production.
- Expenditures on durable producer goods which are small, inexpensive and used to perform relatively simple ongoing operations.
- Expenditures on research and development, staff training, market research and similar activities.
- all goods except dwellings acquired by governmental establishments engaged in the production of defence services, including expenditures by the military on weapons of destruction and the equipment needed to deliver them.
- Rentals paid on buildings or equipment under an operating lease.

etc

== Valuation principles ==
Conceptually, intermediate goods or services should be valued at purchaser's market prices (including transaction costs and tax), at the point in time when the good or service enters the process of production, not when they were acquired by the producer.

In practice, the two times will coincide for inputs of services, but often not for goods, because these can be bought and stored some time as inventories, before they are actually used in production. Taxes

== Workers' consumption ==
Some goods and services bought by enterprises do not enter directly into production of output itself, but are consumed by workers (e.g. work clothing, accommodation, meals, transport, washrooms, medical check-ups).

In such cases it is necessary to distinguish whether items are intermediate consumption or, alternatively, a remuneration "in kind" to employees (for example, fringe benefits such as company cars and meal tickets for private use).

In general, when items are used by employees in their own time and at their own discretion for their own use, they are regarded as remuneration in kind, not intermediate consumption. In that case, they are part of the aggregate compensation of employees, and included in gross value added. But if employees have to use them specifically to do their work, they are included in intermediate consumption, and excluded from value-added.

== Statistical effects of ownership relations on the boundary between intermediate consumption and value-added ==
The statistical boundary between intermediate consumption and value added is affected by ownership relations.

If, for example, an enterprise buys services from other enterprises, instead of producing them in-house, its own value added will be reduced, and its intermediate consumption will be increased.

But because in-house production itself has intermediate inputs, the value of the increase in intermediate consumption that results from in-house production is likely to be less than the value of equivalent services purchased from another enterprise.

Thus, the sizes of total value added and intermediate consumption are affected by the degree to which ancillary activities are either produced in-house by an enterprise, or bought from other enterprises within the domestic economy.

Likewise, rentals paid by a business on buildings or equipment under an operating lease are recorded in national accounts as intermediate consumption, and are excluded from its value-added.

Yet, if an enterprise owns its own buildings, machinery and equipment, most of the costs associated with their use are not recorded under intermediate consumption; depreciation charges are included in gross value added, and interest costs, both actual and implicit, are included in net operating surplus. Only the expenses of materials needed for physical maintenance and repairs to buildings and equipment appear under intermediate consumption.

Consequently, if businesses decide for economic reasons to rent more physical assets, or alternatively buy more physical assets, this can independently affect the size of GDP components and the size of intermediate consumption. If they buy, this boosts GDP; if they rent or lease, this lowers GDP.

== Criticisms ==
One criticism that is made of official national accounts in respect of intermediate consumption concerns the treatment of income from rents, especially business rents.

In UNSNA, a distinction is drawn between property incomes and the rentals receivable and payable under operating leases by producing enterprises.

Such rentals payable by lessees to lessors are treated as purchases of "services produced" by the leasing enterprises, and recorded either as intermediate consumption of renting enterprises, or as the final consumption of households or government.

Yet at the same time owners of funds, land or subsoil assets who exclusively rent out these assets are not considered to be themselves engaged in productive activity at all, and therefore excluded from the production account. The assets loaned, rented or leased are regarded as not being produced in this case, and no capital consumption is considered to be incurred in respect of their use. On the other side, having been included in intermediate consumption, the property incomes payable by enterprises that borrow funds or rent land or subsoil assets do not enter into the calculation of their value added, or operating surpluses, at all.

Thus, even although rents must be paid out of the gross revenue of producing enterprises, they are to a large extent excluded from value-added and GDP. This may be consistent from the point of view of the definition of value-added used, but will provide a misleading view of economic activity and gross profit income, if in fact the proportion of property income in the national income increases.

At the same time, value-added includes the imputed rental value of owner-occupied housing. This is the average market rent owner-occupiers would receive if the housing they occupy is rented. But this addition to GDP is largely fictitious, because the huge majority of owner-occupiers do not rent out their dwellings. The imputation is based on a value theory according to which owner-occupiers receive a "service" provided by dwellings.

According to some estimates, about one in five dollars of profit income in the USA nowadays consists of rentier income, but this is difficult to trace in the accounts (see Epstein & Jayadev 2005 and Michael Hudson 2005 for some discussion). In reality, insofar such estimates are themselves derived from gross product data, they will underestimate the true significance of property income from rents, because many those rents are excluded from gross product accounts.

In Marxian economics, net rents paid out of the current gross income of producing enterprises are not regarded as intermediate expenditure, but as part of the value product. Marx himself commented: "The line between repairs proper and replacement, between costs of maintenance and costs of renewal, is rather flexible. Hence, the eternal dispute, for instance in railroading, whether certain expenses are for repairs or for replacement, whether they must be defrayed from current expenditures or from the original stock. A transfer of expenses for repairs to capital account instead of revenue account is the familiar method by which railway boards of directors artificially inflate their dividends." (Das Kapital, Vol. 2, chapter 8, section 2).

== See also ==
- Double counting
- Faux frais of production
- Fixed capital
- Gross fixed capital formation
- Intermediate good
- National accounts
- System of National Accounts
- Value added
- Value product
