= European System of Accounts =

The European System of Accounts (ESA) is the system of national accounts and regional accounts used by members of the European Union. It was first adopted in 1968, implemented in all member states by 1975, and updated in 2010 (ESA 2010).

The ESA 95 is fully consistent with the United Nations System of National Accounts (1993 SNA) in definitions, accounting rules and classifications. However, it incorporates certain differences, particularly in its presentation, that are more in line with use within the European Union. The ESA 95 underwent a revision to meet the requirements of the update of the SNA 1993 launched in 2003 under the auspices of the United Nations.

== See also ==
- Balance of payments
- Capital account
- Gross national income in the European Union
- Gross output
- Net output
- Value added
