= Gross value added =

Measure of a portion of an economy

In economics, gross value added (GVA) is the measure of the value of goods and services produced in an area, industry or sector of an economy. "The gross value added is the value of output minus the value of intermediate consumption; it is a measure of the contribution to GDP made by an individual producer, industry or sector; gross value added is the source from which the primary incomes of the System of National Accounts (SNA) are generated and is therefore carried forward into the primary distribution of income account."

== Relationship to gross domestic product ==
GVA is an important measure used to determine gross domestic product (GDP). GDP is an indicator of the health of a national economy and economic growth. It represents the monetary value of all products and services produced in the country within a defined period of time. "In comparing GVA and GDP, we can say that GVA is a better measure for the economic welfare of the population, because it includes all primary incomes. From the point of view of the society as a whole GDP, despite its disadvantages, is probably a better measure for economic growth and welfare, because it includes also the net indirect tax (indirect taxes minus subsidies) which are the financial basis for the collective consumption of the society."

The relationship between GVA and GDP is defined as:

GVA = GDP + subsidies on products – taxes on products.

As the total aggregates of taxes on products and subsidies on products are only available at whole economy level, Gross value added is used for measuring gross regional domestic product and other measures of the output of entities smaller than a whole economy.

Restated,

GDP at factor cost = gross value added (GVA) at factor cost;
GDP at factor cost = value of the final goods and services produced within the domestic territory of a country during one year by all production units inclusive of depreciation;
GDP at market price = GDP at factor cost + net indirect taxes (indirect taxes - subsidies);
GVA at factor cost = value of output (quantity * price) - value of intermediary consumption.

== GVA at different levels ==
GVA can be used for measuring of the contribution to GDP made by an individual producer, industry or sector. For instance, to analyze the productivity of the market sector, one can use GVA per worker or GVA per hour. The measure preferred by the Organisation for Economic Cooperation and Development (OECD) in the Productivity Database is GVA per hour.

At the company level, GVA refers to the net income of a produced particular good. "Once the consumption of fixed capital and the effects of depreciation are subtracted, the company knows how much net value a particular operation adds to its bottom line. In other words, the GVA number reveals the contribution made by that particular product to the company's profit."

== Advantages ==
The advantages of the gross value added are:

- Internationally comparable figure
- Better market condition projection globally, especially in case of FIIs

== Disadvantages ==
The only disadvantage of the gross value added is that the comparison over time is difficult.

== Conclusion ==
Over-simplistically, GVA is the grand total of all revenues, from final sales and (net) subsidies, which are incomes into businesses. Those incomes are then used to cover expenses (wages & salaries, dividends), savings (profits, depreciation), and (indirect) taxes.

GVA is sector specific, and GDP is calculated by summation of GVA of all sectors of economy with taxes added and subsidies are deducted.

== See also ==
- Gross income
- Measures of national income and output
