= Value added =

Difference between input value and market value

Value added is a term in economics for calculating the difference between market value of a product or service, and the sum value of its constituents. It is relatively expressed by the supply-demand curve for specific units of sale. Value added is distinguished from the accounting term added value which measures only the financial profits earned upon transformational processes for specific items of sale that are available on the market.

In business, total value added is calculated by tabulating the unit value added (measured by summing unit profit — the difference between sale price and production cost, unit depreciation cost, and unit labor cost) per each unit sold. Thus, total value added is equivalent to revenue minus intermediate consumption. Value added is a higher portion of revenue for integrated companies (e.g. manufacturing companies) and a lower portion of revenue for less integrated companies (e.g. retail companies); total value added is very nearly approximated by compensation of employees, which represents a return to labor, plus earnings before taxes, representative of a return to capital.

== Definition ==
In microeconomics, value added may be defined as the market value of aggregate output of a transformation process, minus the market value of aggregate input (or aggregate inputs) of a transformation process. One may describe value added with the help of Ulbo de Sitter's design theory for production synergies. He divides transformation processes into two categories, parts and aspects. Parts can be compared to timeline stages, such as first preparing the dish, then washing it, then drying it. Aspects are equated with area specialization, for example that someone takes care of the part of the counter that consists of glass, another takes care of the part that consists of plates, a third takes care of cutlery. An important part of understanding value added is therefore to examine delimitations.

In macroeconomics, the term refers to the contribution of the factors of production (i.e. capital and labor) to raise the value of the product and increase the income of those who own the said factors. Therefore, the national value added is shared between capital and labor.

Outside of business and economics, value added refers to the economic enhancement that a company gives its products or services prior to offering them to the consumer, which justifies why companies are able to sell products for more than they cost the company to produce. Additionally, this enhancement also helps distinguish the company's products from those of its competitors.

== National accounts ==
The factors of production provide "services" which raise the unit price of a product (X) relative to the cost per unit of intermediate goods used up in the production of X.

In national accounts, such as the United Nations System of National Accounts (UNSNA) or the United States National Income and Product Accounts (NIPA), gross value added is obtained by deducting intermediate consumption from gross output. Thus gross value added is equal to net output. Net value added is obtained by deducting consumption of fixed capital (or depreciation charges) from gross value added. Net value added therefore equals gross wages, pre-tax profits net of depreciation, and indirect taxes less subsidies.

== Value added tax ==
Value-added tax (VAT) is a tax on sales. It is assessed incrementally on a product or service at each stage of production and is intended to tax the value that is added by that production stage, as outlined above by unit value added.

== See also ==
- Bang for the buck
- Economic value added
- Measures of national income and output#The output approach
- Productive and unproductive labour
- Surplus value
- United Nations System of National Accounts (UNSNA)
- Valorisation
- Value (marketing)
- Value-added reseller
- Value chain
- Value product
- Wage share
