= Gross output =

Measure of total economic activity

In economics, gross output (GO) is a measure of the value of production of new goods and services during an accounting period. Gross output represents the total value of sales by producing enterprises (their gross revenue or turnover) in an accounting period (a quarter or a year), before subtracting the value of intermediate goods used up in production from the value of sales. Gross output can also be defined as the value of net output (the gross value-added or GDP) plus the value of intermediate consumption.

Gross output is therefore a broader measure of the value of production than gross domestic product (GDP), which measures only the net value of final output (finished goods and services). As of third-quarter 2024, for example, the Bureau of Economic Analysis estimated gross output in the United States to be $50.9 trillion, compared to $29.3 trillion for GDP.

Gross output and net output are complementary measures of the value of production. The components of gross output provide extra insight about the inputs and factor costs of production as well as the transactions between economic sectors. They indicate the total expenditures and total sales that enterprises or sectors have. Net output measures indicate the net new wealth created by sectors or by all sectors put together. "Gross output [GO] is the natural measure of the production sector, while net output [GDP] is appropriate as a measure of welfare. Both are required in a complete system of accounts."

Starting in April 2014, the Bureau of Economic Analysis began publishing gross output and gross output-by-industry on a quarterly basis, along with GDP.

== Historical background ==
In his work, The Purchasing Power of Money: Its Determination and Relation to Credit, Interest, and Crises (1911, 1920), Yale professor Irving Fisher introduced a theoretical measure of "volume of trade" with his equation of exchange: MV = PT, where PT measured the "volume of trade" in the economy at a specified time.

In 1931, Friedrich A. Hayek, the Austrian economist at the London School of Economics, created a diagram known as Hayek's triangles as a theoretical measure of the stages of production. Hayek's triangles formed the basis of gross output, before GNP or GDP were invented. However, Hayek's work was strictly theoretical, and no attempt was developed to statistically measure gross output.

Simon Kuznets, a Russian American economist at the University of Pennsylvania, did breakthrough work in the 1930s in measuring national income, "the size of the final net product." He defined net product as follows: "If all the commodities produced and all the direct services rendered during the year are added to their market value, and from the resulting total we subtract the value of that part of the nation's stock of goods that was expended (both as raw materials and as capital equipment) in producing this total, then the remainder constitutes the net product of the national economy of the year." Thus, net product focused on final output only, and excluded business-to-business (B2B) transactions in the supply chain. He expanded his "net output" data to measure Gross National Product (GNP) starting in 1942.

Following the Bretton Woods Agreement in 1946, GNP became the standard measure of economic growth. Wassily Leontief, a Russian American economist at Harvard University, followed with the development of the first input-output tables, which he regarded as a better survey of the whole economy. I-O accounts require examining the "intervening steps" between inputs and outputs in the production process, "a complex series of transactions…among real people"

I-O data created the first estimates of gross output. However, Leontief did not emphasize GO as an important macroeconomic tool. He focused on gross output-by-industry, i.e., the inner-workings between industries, not the aggregate GO. The BEA began publishing GO data on an annual basis in the early 1990s, and was not updated on a quarterly basis until 2014. BEA director J. Steven Landefeld spearheaded the effort to bring gross output and gross output-by-industry up to date and released quarterly.

Mark Skousen introduced gross output as an essential macroeconomic tool in his work, The Structure of Production in 1990; see also Mark Skousen, "At Last, a Better Economic Measure", Wall Street Journal (April 23, 2014). According to Skousen, GO demonstrates that business spending is significantly larger than consumer spending in the economy, and tends to be more volatile than GDP. Earlier-stage and intermediate inputs in GO may also be helpful in forecasting the direction of economic growth. He contends that gross output should be the starting point of national income accounting, and offers a more complete picture of the macro economy. GO can be integrated into macroeconomic analysis and textbook economics, and is more consistent with leading indicators and other macroeconomic data. He makes the case that GO and GDP complement each other as macroeconomic tools and that both should play a vital role in national accounting statistics, much like top line and bottom line accounting are employed to providing a complete picture of quarterly earnings reports of publicly traded companies.

== Controversies ==
Economists have praised and criticized gross output. They include David Colander, followed by a rejoinder by Mark Skousen, Steve Hanke, Gene Epstein and Steve Forbes

Skousen has also criticized the BEA's measure of gross output for failing to include a measure of total gross sales at the wholesale and retail level, amounting to more than $7.6 trillion of business spending (B2B) in 2014.

== See also ==
- GDP
- GNP
- Input–output model
- Intermediate consumption
- National accounts
- Net output
- Sectoral output
- United Nations System of National Accounts (UNSNA)
