= National accounts =

Accounting system used by a nation

National accounts or national account systems (NAS) are the implementation of complete and consistent accounting techniques for measuring the economic activity of a nation. These include detailed underlying measures that rely on double-entry accounting. By design, such accounting makes the totals on both sides of an account equal even though they each measure different characteristics, for example production and the income from it. As a method, the subject is termed national accounting or, more generally, social accounting. Stated otherwise, national accounts as systems may be distinguished from the economic data associated with those systems. While sharing many common principles with business accounting, national accounts are based on economic concepts. One conceptual construct for representing flows of all economic transactions that take place in an economy is a social accounting matrix with accounts in each respective row-column entry.

National accounting has developed in tandem with macroeconomics from the 1930s with its relation of aggregate demand to total output through interaction of such broad expenditure categories as consumption and investment. Economic data from national accounts are also used for empirical analysis of economic growth and development.

== Scope ==
National accounts broadly present output, expenditure, and income activities of the economic actors (households, corporations, government) in an economy, including their relations with other countries' economies, and their wealth (net worth). They present both flows (measured but it is over a period) and stocks (measured at the end of a period), ensuring that the flows are reconciled with the stocks. As to flows, the national income and product accounts (in U.S. terminology) provide estimates for the money value of income and output per year or quarter, including GDP. As to stocks, the 'capital accounts' are a balance-sheet approach that has assets on one side (including values of land, the capital stock, and financial assets) and liabilities and net worth on the other, measured as of the end of the accounting period. National accounts also include measures of the changes in assets, liabilities, and net worth per accounting period. These may refer to flow of funds accounts or, again, capital accounts.

There are a number of aggregate measures in the national accounts, notably including gross domestic product or GDP, perhaps the most widely cited measure of aggregate economic activity. Ways of breaking down GDP include as types of income (wages, profits, etc.) or expenditure (consumption, investment/saving, etc.). Measures of these are examples of macro-economic data. Such aggregate measures and their change over time are generally of strongest interest to economic policymakers, although the detailed national accounts contain a source of information for economic analysis, for example in the input-output tables which show how industries interact with each other in the production process.

National accounts can be presented in nominal or real amounts, with real amounts adjusted to remove the effects of price changes over time. A corresponding price index can also be derived from national output. Rates of change of the price level and output may also be of interest. An inflation rate (growth rate of the price level) may be calculated for national output or its expenditure components. Economic growth rates (most commonly the growth rate of GDP) are generally measured in real (constant-price) terms. One use of economic-growth data from the national accounts is in growth accounting across longer periods of time for a country or across to estimate different sources of growth, whether from growth of factor inputs or technological change.

The accounts are derived from a wide variety of statistical source data including surveys, administrative and census data, and regulatory data, which are integrated and harmonized in the conceptual framework. They are usually compiled by national statistical offices and/or central banks in each country, though this is not always the case, and may be released on both an annual and (less detailed) quarterly frequency. Practical issues include inaccuracies from differences between economic and accounting methodologies, lack of controlled experiments on quality of data from diverse sources, and measurement of intangibles and services of the banking and financial sectors.

Two developments relevant to the national accounts since the 1980s include the following. Generational accounting is a method for measuring redistribution of lifetime tax burdens across generations from social insurance, including social security and social health insurance. It has been proposed as a better guide to the sustainability of a fiscal policy than budget deficits, which reflect only taxes minus spending in the current year. Environmental or green national accounting is the method of valuing environmental assets, which are usually not counted in measuring national wealth, in part due to the difficulty of valuing them. The method has been proposed as an alternative to an implied zero valuation of environmental assets and as a way of measuring the sustainability of welfare levels in the presence of environmental degradation.

Macro-economic data not derived from the national accounts are also of wide interest, for example some cost-of-living indexes, the unemployment rate, and the labor force participation rate. In some cases, a national-accounts counterpart of these may be estimated, such as a price index computed from the personal consumption expenditures and the GDP gap (the difference between observed GDP and potential GDP).

== Main elements ==
The presentation of national accounts data may vary by country (commonly, aggregate measures are given greatest prominence), however the main national accounts include the following accounts for the economy as a whole and its main economic actors.

- Current accounts:

production accounts which record the value of domestic output and the goods and services used up in producing that output. The balancing item of the accounts is value added, which is equal to GDP when expressed for the whole economy at market prices and in gross terms;
income accounts, which show primary and secondary income flows—both the income generated in production (e.g. wages and salaries) and distributive income flows (predominantly the redistributive effects of government taxes and social benefit payments). The balancing item of the accounts is disposable income ("National Income" when measured for the whole economy);
expenditure accounts, which show how disposable income is either consumed or saved. The balancing item of these accounts is saving.

- Capital accounts, which record the net accumulation, as the result of transactions, of non-financial assets; and the financing, by way of saving and capital transfers, of the accumulation. Net lending/borrowing is the balancing item for these accounts
- Financial accounts, which show the net acquisition of financial assets and the net incurrence of liabilities. The balance on these accounts is the net change in financial position.
- Balance sheets, which record the stock of assets, both financial and non-financial, and liabilities at a particular point in time. Net worth is the balance from the balance sheets (United Nations, 1993).

The accounts may be measured as gross or net of consumption of fixed capital (a concept in national accounts similar to depreciation in business accounts).

Notably absent from these components, however, is unpaid work, because its value is not included in any of the aforementioned categories of accounts, just as it is not included in calculating gross domestic product (GDP). An Australian study has shown the value of this uncounted work to be approximately 50% of GDP, making its exclusion rather significant. As GDP is tied closely to the national accounts system, this may lead to a distorted view of national accounts. Because national accounts are widely used by governmental policy-makers in implementing controllable economic agendas, some analysts have advocated for either a change in the makeup of national accounts or adjustments in the formulation of public policy.

== History ==
The original motivation for the development of national accounts and the systematic measurement of employment was the need for accurate measures of aggregate economic activity. This was made more pressing by the Great Depression and as a basis for Keynesian macroeconomic stabilisation policy and wartime economic planning. The first efforts to develop such measures were undertaken in the late 1920s and 1930s, notably by Colin Clark and Simon Kuznets. Kuznets building on a project that was underway https://www.nber.org/system/files/chapters/c4231/c4231.pdf, Lillian Epstein had been involved in earlier studies. Richard Stone of the U.K. led later contributions during World War II and thereafter. The first formal national accounts were published by the United States in 1947. Many European countries followed shortly thereafter, and the United Nations published A System of National Accounts and Supporting Tables in 1952. International standards for national accounting are defined by the United Nations System of National Accounts, with the most recent version released for 2008.

Even before that in early 1920s there were national economic accounts tables. One of such systems was called Balance of national economy and was used in USSR and other socialistic countries to measure the efficiency of socialistic production.

In Europe, the worldwide System of National Accounts has been adapted in the European System of Accounts (ESA), which is applied by members of the European Union and many other European countries. Research on the subject continues from its beginnings through today.

== See also ==
- Accounting identity
- Aggregation problem
- European System of Accounts
- Measures of national income and output
- Material Product System
- National Income and Product Accounts (US)
- Official statistics
- Penn World Table
- Savings identity
- Sectoral balances
- Social accounting
- United Nations System of National Accounts
