= Social statistics =

Use of statistical measurement systems to study human behavior in a social environment

Social statistics is the use of statistical measurement systems to study human behavior in a social environment. This can be accomplished through polling a group of people, evaluating a subset of data obtained about a group of people, or by observation and statistical analysis of a set of data that relates to people and their behaviors.

== Statistics in the social sciences ==
=== History ===
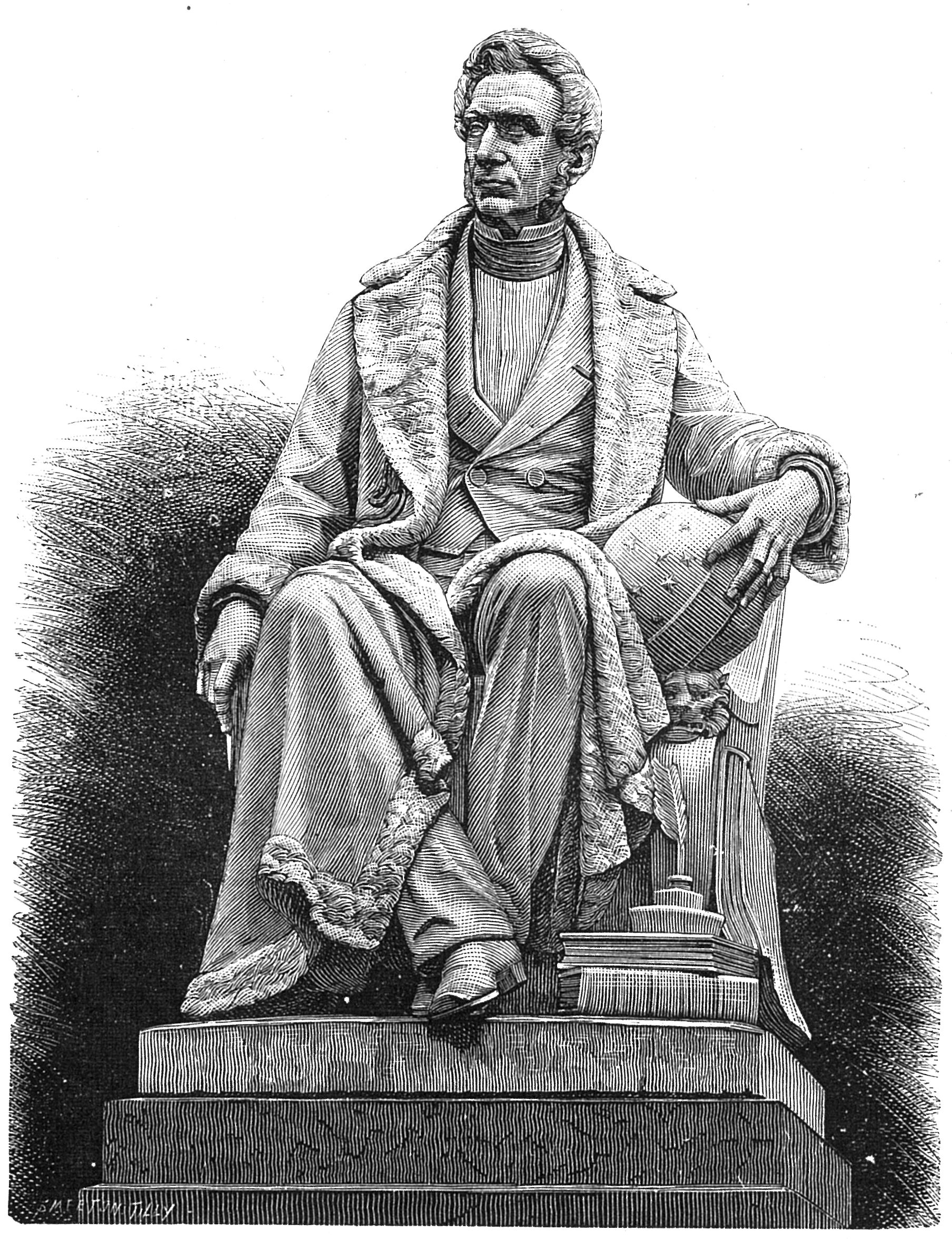
Adolph Quetelet published data on European population.

Adolph Quetelet was a proponent of social physics. In his book Physique sociale he presents distributions of human heights, age of marriage, time of birth and death, time series of human marriages, births and deaths, a survival density for humans and curve describing fecundity as a function of age. He also developed the Quetelet Index.

Francis Ysidro Edgeworth published "On Methods of Ascertaining Variations in the Rate of Births, Deaths, and Marriages" in 1885 which uses squares of differences for studying fluctuations and George Udny Yule published "On the Correlation of total Pauperism with Proportion of Out-Relief" in 1895.

A numerical calibration for the fertility curve was given by Karl Pearson in 1897 in his "The Chances of Death, and Other Studies in Evolution" In this book Pearson also uses standard deviation, correlation and skewness for studying humans.

Vilfredo Pareto published his analysis of the distribution of income in Great Britain and Ireland in 1897, this is now known as the Pareto principle.

Louis Guttman proposed that the values of ordinal variables can be represented by a Guttman scale, which is useful if the number of variables is large and allows the use of techniques such as ordinary least squares.

Macroeconomic statistical research has provided stylized facts, which include:

- Bowley's law (1937) regarding the proportion between wages and national output
- The Phillips curve (1958) regarding the relation between wages and unemployment

Statistics and statistical analyses have become a key feature of social science: statistics is employed in economics, psychology, political science, sociology and anthropology.

=== Statistical methods in social sciences ===
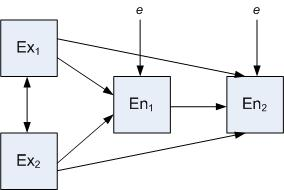
Diagram illustrating path analysis: causal paths link endogenous variables and exogenous variables.

Cluster analysis showing two main clusters

A classification performed using the perceptron algorithm

Methods and concepts used in quantitative social sciences include:

- Research design, survey methodology and survey sampling
- Delphi method

Statistical techniques include:

==== Covariance based methods ====
- Regression analysis
- Canonical correlation
- Causal analysis
- Multilevel models
- Factor analysis
- Linear discriminant analysis
- Path analysis
- Structural Equation Modeling

==== Probability based methods ====
- Probit and logit
- Item response theory
- Bayesian statistics
- Stochastic process
- Latent class model

==== Distance based methods ====
- Cluster analysis
- Multidimensional scaling

==== Methods for categorical data ====
- Classification analysis
- Cohort analysis

=== Usage and applications ===
Social scientists use social statistics for many purposes, including:

- the evaluation of the quality of services available to a group or organization,
- analyzing behaviors of groups of people in their environment and special situations,
- determining the wants of people through statistical sampling
- evaluation of wage expenditures and savings
- preventing industrial diseases
- prevention of industrial accidents
- labour disputes, such as supporting the Anthracite Coal Strike Commission of 1902-1903
- supporting governments in times of peace and war

=== Reliability ===
The use of statistics has become so widespread in the social sciences that many universities such as Harvard, have developed institutes focusing on "quantitative social science." Harvard's Institute for Quantitative Social Science focuses mainly on fields like political science that incorporate the advanced causal statistical models that Bayesian methods provide. However, some experts in causality feel that these claims of causal statistics are overstated. There is a debate regarding the uses and value of statistical methods in social science, especially in political science, with some statisticians questioning practices such as data dredging that can lead to unreliable policy conclusions of political partisans who overestimate the interpretive power that non-robust statistical methods such as simple and multiple linear regression allow. Indeed, an important axiom that social scientists cite, but often forget, is that "correlation does not imply causation."
