= The Triple Revolution =

Open memorandum

"The Triple Revolution" was an open memorandum sent to U.S. President Lyndon B. Johnson and other government figures on March 22, 1964. It concerned three megatrends of the time: increasing use of automation, the nuclear arms race, and advancements in human rights. Drafted under the auspices of the Center for the Study of Democratic Institutions, it was signed by an array of noted social activists, professors, and technologists who identified themselves as the Ad Hoc Committee on the Triple Revolution. The chief initiator of the proposal was W. H. "Ping" Ferry, at that time a vice-president of CSDI, basing it in large part on the ideas of the futurist Robert Theobald.

== Overview ==
The statement identified three revolutions underway in the world: the cybernation revolution of increasing automation; the weaponry revolution of mutually assured destruction; and the human rights revolution. It discussed primarily the cybernation revolution. The committee claimed that machines would usher in "a system of almost unlimited productive capacity" while continually reducing the number of manual laborers needed, and increasing the skill needed to work, thereby producing increasing levels of unemployment. It proposed that the government should ease this transformation through large-scale public works, low-cost housing, public transit, electrical power development, income redistribution, union representation for the unemployed, and government restraint on technology deployment.

== Legacy ==
Martin Luther King Jr.'s final Sunday sermon, delivered six days before his April 1968 assassination, explicitly references the thesis of "The Triple Revolution":

There can be no gainsaying of the fact that a great revolution is taking place in the world today. In a sense it is a triple revolution: that is, a technological revolution, with the impact of automation and cybernation; then there is a revolution in weaponry, with the emergence of atomic and nuclear weapons of warfare; then there is a human rights revolution, with the freedom explosion that is taking place all over the world. Yes, we do live in a period where changes are taking place. And there is still the voice crying through the vista of time saying, "Behold, I make all things new; former things are passed away."

— Martin Luther King Jr., Remaining Awake Through a Great Revolution

In Harlan Ellison's 1967 anthology Dangerous Visions, Philip José Farmer's story "Riders of the Purple Wage" uses the Triple Revolution document as the premise of a future society, in which the "purple wage" of the title is a guaranteed income dole on which most of the population lives. At the 1968 World Science Fiction Convention in San Francisco, Farmer delivered a lengthy Guest of Honor speech in which he called for the founding of a grassroots activist organization called REAP which would work for implementation of the Ad Hoc Committee's recommendations.

Looking back on the proposal in his 2008 book, Daniel Bell wrote:

"the cybernetic revolution quickly proved to be illusory. There were no spectacular jumps in productivity. ... Cybernation had proved to be one more instance of the penchant for overdramatizing a momentary innovation and blowing it up far out of proportion to its actuality. ... The image of a completely automated production economy—with an endless capacity to turn out goods—was simply a social-science fiction of the early 1960s. Paradoxically, the vision of Utopia was suddenly replaced by the spectre of Doomsday. In place of the early-sixties theme of endless plenty, the picture by the end of the decade was one of a fragile planet of limited resources whose finite stocks were being rapidly depleted, and whose wastes from soaring industrial production were polluting the air and waters."

In his 2015 book Rise of the Robots, Martin Ford claims The Triple Revolution's predictions of steady decline in future employment were not wrong, but rather premature. He cites "Seven Deadly Trends" that began in the 1970s-1980s and by the mid-2010s appeared set to continue:

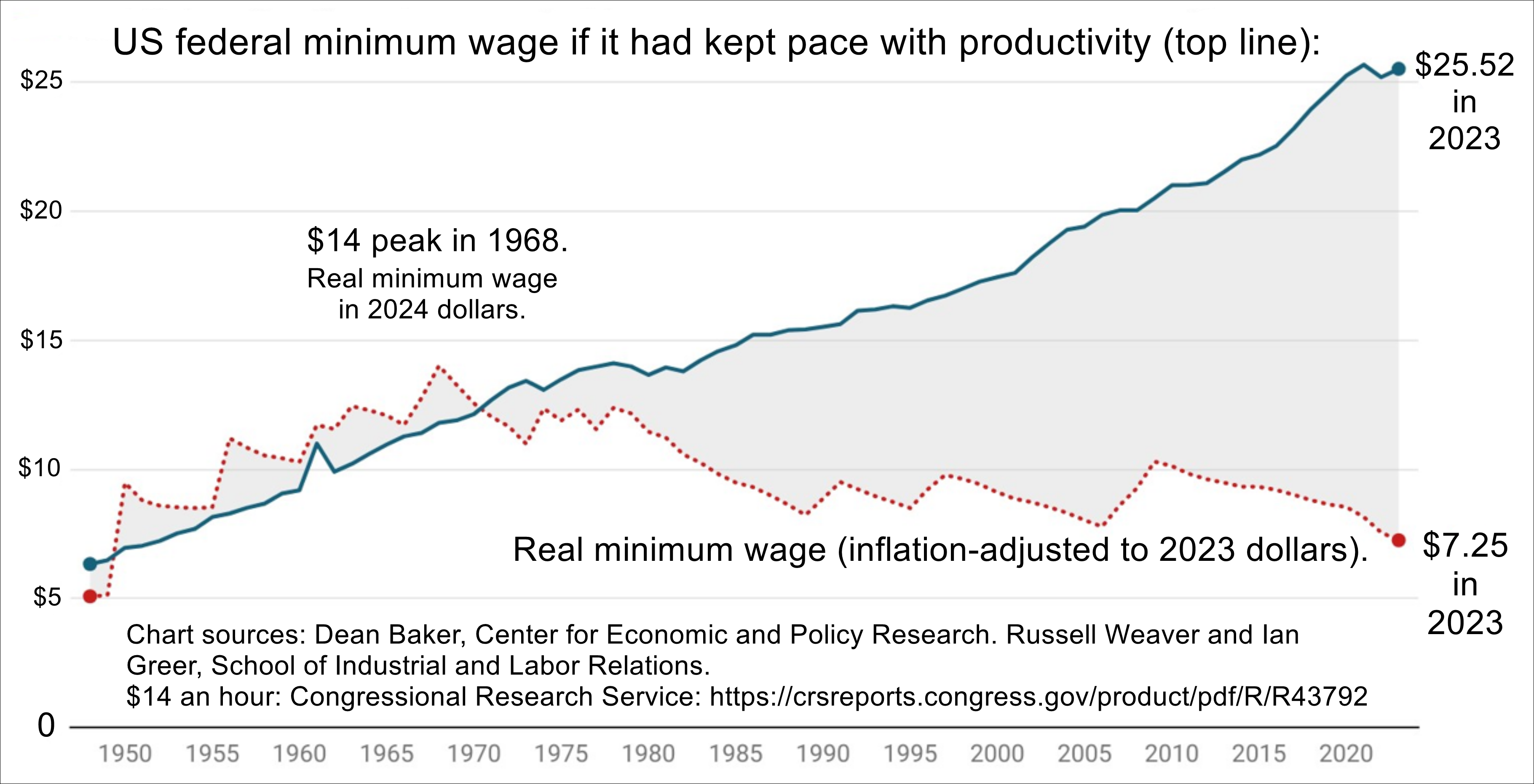
US federal minimum wage if it had kept pace with productivity. Also, the real minimum wage.

1. Stagnation in real wages
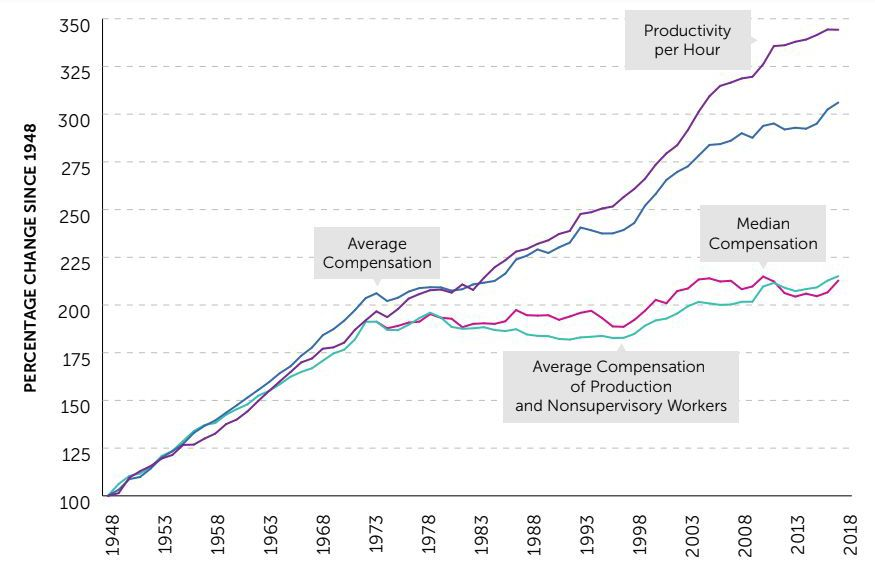
  Productivity and compensation growth in the United States, 1948–2016
2. Decline in labor's share of national income in many countries (breakdown of Bowley's law), while corporate profits increased
3. Declining labor force participation
4. Diminishing job creation, lengthening jobless recoveries, and soaring long-term unemployment
5. Rising inequality
6. Declining incomes, and underemployment for recent college graduates
7. Polarization and part-time jobs (middle-class jobs are disappearing, to be replaced by a small number of high-paying jobs and large number of low-paying jobs)

According to Ford, the 1960s were part of what in retrospect seems like a golden age for labor in the United States, when productivity and wages rose together in near lockstep, and unemployment was low. But after about 1980, wages began stagnating while productivity continued to rise. Labor's share of the economic output began to decline. Ford describes the role that automation and information technology play in these trends, and how new technologies including narrow AI threaten to destroy jobs faster than displaced workers can be retrained for new jobs, before automation takes the new jobs as well. This includes many job categories, such as in transportation, that were never threatened by automation before. According to a 2013 study, about 47% of US jobs are susceptible to automation.

== Signatories ==
- Todd Gitlin
- Roger Hagan (journalist)
- Michael Harrington
- Tom Hayden
- Ralph L. Helstein (union leader)
- Frances W. Herring (professor of governmental studies)
- Gerard Piel
- Michael D. Reagan
- Ben B. Seligman
- Robert Theobald
- William Worthy
- Alice Mary Hilton (1919-2011, technologist)
- Maxwell Geismar (author)
- Philip Green (professor of political science)
- H. Stuart Hughes (professor of history)
- Linus Pauling
- John William Ward
- Hugh B. Hester
- Gerald W. Johnson (journalist)
- Irving F. Laucks (industrialist)
- Gunnar Myrdal (economist)
- A. J. Muste (activist)
- Louis Fein (computer consultant)
- Stewart Meacham (activist)
- Everett C. Hughes (professor of sociology)
- Robert Heilbroner
- Irving Howe
- Bayard Rustin
- Norman Thomas
- Dwight Macdonald
- Carl F. Stover (academic)
- Donald G. Agger (attorney)
- Donald B. Armstrong (physician)
- James Boggs
- W. H. Ferry (activist)

== See also ==
- Basic income
- Cybernetics
- Norbert Wiener
- Post-scarcity economy
- Technological unemployment

== Bibliography ==
- Perrucci, Robert, and Pilisuk, Marc [editors], "The Triple Revolution: social problems in depth", Boston: Little Brown & Co., 1968.
