= Slope chart =

Type of chart

A slope chart, also known as a slope graph, is a simple data visualization used to show changes between two numerical values for multiple categories. It connects paired data points across two vertical axes using straight lines, helping to highlight relative increases and decreases.

== History ==
The use of slope charts in visual analytics was popularized by Edward Tufte in the early 1980s. Tufte advocated for charts that maximize data-to-ink ratio, and the slope chart became an example of conveying change clearly with minimal graphic elements.

== Design and features ==
A typical slope chart has two parallel vertical axes that represent two points in time or conditions. Each category’s value is plotted on both axes, and the pair is connected with a straight line.

The angle of each line indicates the direction and magnitude of change. A steeper slope signifies a larger difference between the two values. If the line slopes upward from left to right, it indicates an increase; if downward, a decrease; and a horizontal line indicates no change.

Slope charts are often used for:

- Comparing before-and-after data, such as sales figures pre- and post-campaign.
- Displaying performance differences between two groups or periods.
- Showing rank shifts in survey results or sports standings.

According to data visualization practitioners, slope charts are especially effective when there is a clear need to communicate relative position and ranking alongside the magnitude of change.

== Advantages ==
Slope charts offer:

- Clarity for small to moderate numbers of categories.
- An immediate view of increase or decrease.
- An easy way to compare multiple trends in one graphic.

== Limitations ==
Slope charts may become crowded and difficult to interpret if too many lines cross or if the number of categories is large. They are designed to compare only two data points; for longer time series, line charts or other forms are more appropriate.

== Related charts ==
Slope charts are related to other comparative graphics, such as line charts, bump charts, dumbbell plots, bar charts, and dot plots, which illustrate differences or changes in ranking and numerical data.
