= Anne Deveson =

Australian novelist, broadcaster, filmmaker (1930–2016)

Anne Deveson AO
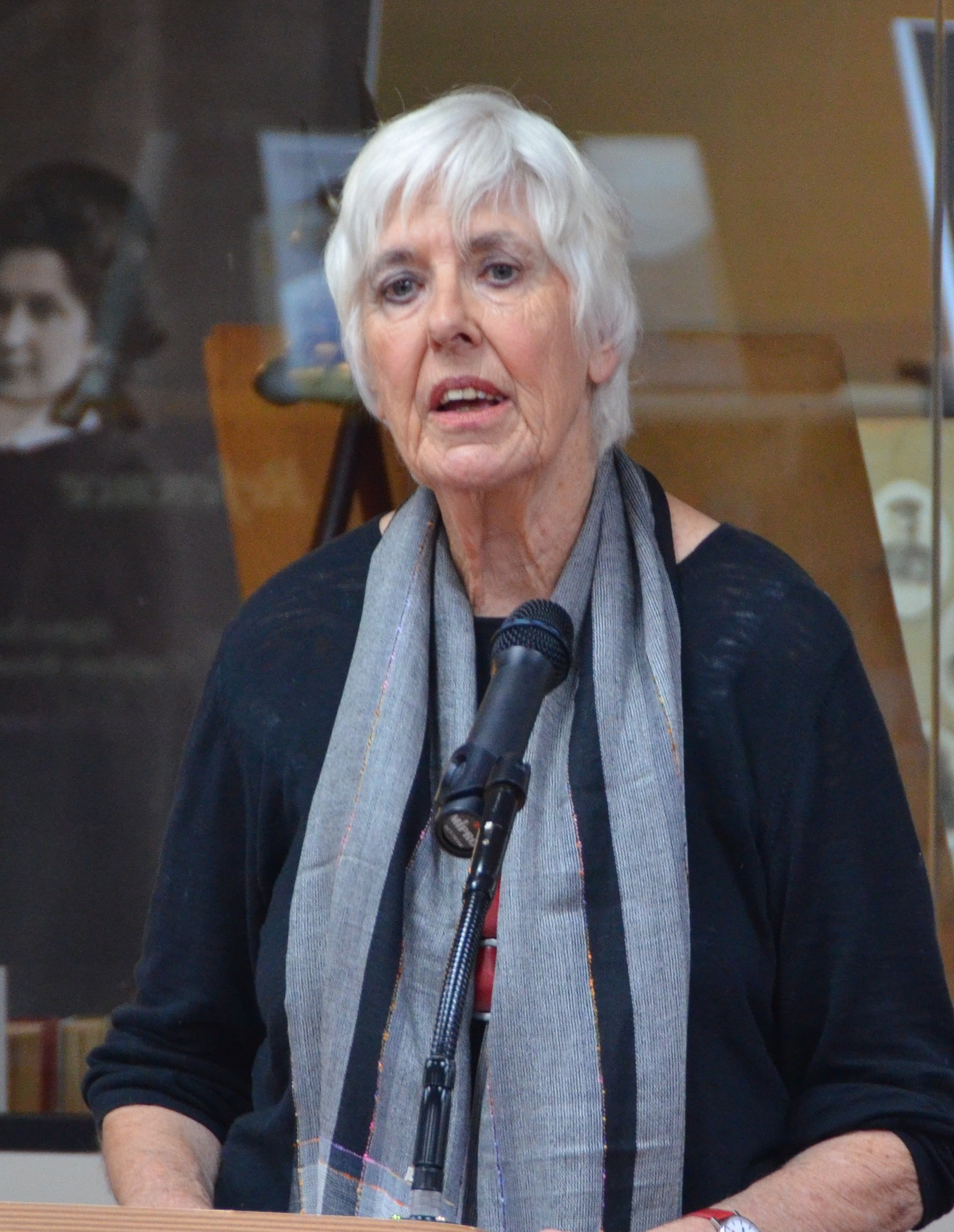
- Deveson in 2013
- Born: Anne Barbara Deveson; 19 June 1930; Kuala Lumpur, Malaya
- Died: 12 December 2016 (aged 86); Sydney, Australia
- Occupations: Novelist; broadcaster; filmmaker; social commentator
- Spouse: Ellis Blain
- Partner: Robert Theobald
- Children: 3, including Georgia Blain

Anne Barbara Deveson AO (19 June 1930 – 12 December 2016) was an Australian writer, broadcaster and filmmaker who also worked in England.

== Early life ==
Deveson was born in Kuala Lumpur, Malaya. During World War II, her family was evacuated to Western Australia as refugees before returning to England. Her first job was on a small London newspaper called The Kensington News.

She later worked in the London offices of the BBC and The New York Times. In 1956, Deveson moved back to Australia and began working for the Australian Broadcasting Commission in Sydney.

== Career ==
In the 1950s, Deveson was a presenter for radio station 2GB and was one of the first people in Australia to use talkback radio.

Deveson was known to many Australians as "the Omo lady" after appearing in television commercials for that brand of soap powder. Later in her career, she held a number of leadership positions in the industry: she chaired the South Australian Film Corporation from 1984 to 1987 and from 1985 to 1988, she was executive director of the Australian Film, Television and Radio School.

Deveson was also an active lobbyist for the rights of women, children and disabled people. Following the diagnosis of her son Jonathan with schizophrenia and his death from a drug overdose, she helped to start the Schizophrenia Fellowship of NSW in 1985. In 1986 she worked with Dr Margaret Leggatt to launch the national body Schizophrenia Australia Foundation, now named SANE Australia. She was also a member of the Royal Commission into Human Relationships (1974–77), NSW Medical Tribunal (1999–2010), Expert Advisory Group on Drugs and Alcohol (1999–2007) and the NSW Mental Health Tribunal (2002–07).

Deveson wrote about her experiences with her son's illness and death in Tell Me I'm Here, which won the 1991 Human Rights and Equal Opportunity Commission for non-fiction writing, and then translated her work into the documentary film Spinning Out. Simon Champ, SANE Australia Ambassador featured in this documentary. His pioneering work with Anne Deveson to bring the experience of Schizophrenia to the mainstream arena of mental health services dates from this collaboration and his meeting with Anne Deveson at a public event in which he stood up out of the audience to give voice to the experience of Schizophrenia. This work has had the effect of reducing stigma in Australia regarding this mental health issue.

Her book Resilience was written after the sudden death of her partner, the English economist Robert Theobald, in 1999 and draws on her emotions and feelings.

Deveson was made a Member of the Order of Australia in 1983 for services to the media and an Officer of the Order of Australia in 1993 for her work in community health and for increasing the public awareness of schizophrenia.

In 1994, she received an honorary doctorate from the University of South Australia.

== Personal life and death ==
Deveson was married to broadcaster Ellis Blain for twenty years. The couple had three children: a daughter, the writer Georgia Blain (1964–2016), and two sons. Following Ellis Blain's death in 1979, she had a long-term relationship with economist Robert Theobald.

Deveson was diagnosed with Alzheimer's disease in 2014. She died on 12 December 2016, three days after the death of her daughter Georgia Blain.

== Bibliography ==
- Australians at Risk (Cassell, 1978)
- Tell Me I'm Here (Penguin, 1991) ISBN 0-14-017339-0
- Coming of Age: Twenty-one Interviews About Growing Older (Scribe Publications, 1994)
- Lines in the Sand (Penguin, 2000)
- Resilience (Allen & Unwin, 2003) ISBN 1-86448-634-1
- Waging Peace (Allen & Unwin, 2013) ISBN 978-1-74331-003-8

== Filmography ==
- Who Killed Jenny Langby? (South Australian Film Corporation, 1974, acted as herself), a docudrama written by Greg Barker and Donald Crombie (producer).
- Do I Have to Kill My Child? (C.I.D. Productions, 1976, co-writer with Donald Crombie, producer)
- Achieving (Pilgrim International Films, 1979, writer) TV show produced by Betty Wood
- A Matter of Chance (1982 documentary series)
- Faces of Change (1982 documentary series)
- Spinning Out (Australian Film Commission, 1991, writer, director and producer)
- Paper Trails episode, Compass (October 2017, Mental As Week, feature)
