= Kaldor's facts =

Six statements about economic growth

Kaldor's facts are six statements about economic growth, proposed by Nicholas Kaldor in his article from 1961. He described these as "a stylized view of the facts", which coined the term stylized fact.

== Stylized facts of economic growth ==
Nicholas Kaldor summarized the statistical properties of long-term economic growth in an influential 1961 paper. He pointed out the 6 following 'remarkable historical constancies revealed by recent empirical investigations':

1. The shares of national income received by labor and capital are roughly constant over long periods of time
2. The rate of growth of the capital stock per worker is roughly constant over long periods of time
3. The rate of growth of output per worker is roughly constant over long periods of time
4. The capital/output ratio is roughly constant over long periods of time
5. The rate of return on investment is roughly constant over long periods of time
6. There are appreciable variations (2 to 5 percent) in the rate of growth of labor productivity and of total output among countries.

Kaldor did not claim that any of these quantities would be constant at all times; on the contrary, growth rates and income shares fluctuate strongly over the business cycle. Instead, his claim was that these quantities tend to be constant when averaging the data over long periods of time. His broad generalizations, which were initially derived from the U.S. and U.K. data, but were later found to be true for many other countries as well, came to be known as 'stylized facts'.

These may be summarized and related as follows:

1. Output per worker grows at a roughly constant rate that does not diminish over time.
2. Capital per worker grows over time.
3. The capital/output ratio is roughly constant. (1+2)
4. The rate of return on capital is constant.
5. The share of capital and labor in net income is nearly constant.
6. The wage grows over time. (2+4+5)

== Bibliography ==
- Lutz, F. A.; Hague, Douglas, eds. (1986) [1961]. "Capital Accumulation and Economic Growth". The Theory of Capital. London: Macmillan. ISBN 978-0-333-40636-6.
- Allen, R. G. D. (1968). "Kaldor (Keynesian) Models". Macro-Economic Theory: A Mathematical Treatment. London: Macmillan. pp. 305–320. ISBN 978-0-333-04112-3.
- Jones, Charles I.; Romer, Paul M. (2010). "The New Kaldor Facts: Ideas, Institutions, Population, and Human Capital". American Economic Journal: Macroeconomics. 2 (1): 224–245. doi:10.1257/mac.2.1.224.
