= Irving F. Laucks =

American chemist and philanthropist (1882–1981)

Irving Fink Laucks (July 3, 1882-March 9, 1981) was an American chemist and philanthropist.

== Biography ==
Laucks was born in Akron, where he attended public schools and graduated second in his high school class. He received a bachelor's degree in 1904 from the Case School of Applied Science and a master's degree from the Case School in 1909. Around 1923, Laucks discovered a cheap and effective soybean glue used for the manufacture of Douglas fir plywood. This glue made plywood resistant to moisture, allowing it to be used on exterior surfaces for the first time. By 1930, seven years after Lauck's discovery, the glue was used in all Douglas fir plywood plants. With James A. Nevin, the two men "dominated the development of wood product glues in the United States between 1927 to 1946". His company, I.F. Laucks Inc., was acquired by Monsanto in 1944.

== Political activism and philanthropy ==
Around 1960, Laucks began to be active in the peace movement, sponsoring talks by Robert Pickus and encouraging the public to express their desire for peace. He wrote a letter to Eisenhower in January 1960, advocating for a plan of reciprocal disarmament, where the United States would reduce its supply of weaponry by two percent and encourage other countries to do the same. Using his personal fortune from his plywood company, he became an early investor in Ramparts magazine. In 1967 he was also on the board of sponsors for M.S. Arnoni's magazine The Minority of One. He also provided funds to Robert M. Hutchins' Center for the Study of Democratic Institutions, specifically donating to fund the work of Women's Strike for Peace activists Marjory Collins and Eleanor Garst. In spring 1964, Laucks became a consultant for the Center and eventually moved to Santa Barbara to increase his involvement with its work. That year, Laucks was a member of the Ad Hoc Committee on the Triple Revolution and a signatory of the Triple Revolution memorandum.

Laucks was also interested in religious movements and parapsychology He studied the relationship between ESP and religious experiences. Eventually, Laucks came to believe that "psychic phenomena constitute just as real a part of the world" as scientific data. In 1953, Laucks published the book A Speculation in Reality, which addressed psychic phenomena using his background as a chemist and scientist. In a 1968 editorial, he proposed the creation of a new religion based on scientific principles of evolution and research. Laucks was an early investor in the Glendan Company in the 1970s, which attempted to build machines that could record psychic phenomena.

== Personal life ==
He married Eulah Croson She served as the director of Center for the Study of Democratic Institutions and was a regent of Immaculate Heart College.
