= American Friends Service Committee =

Quaker organization

- Founded: April 30, 1917
- Founder: 17 members of the Religious Society of Friends
- Type: 501(c)(3) organization
- Tax ID no.: 23-1352010
- Location: Philadelphia, Pennsylvania, US
- Origins: Haverford, Pennsylvania, US
- Region served: Worldwide with U.S. emphasis
- Key people: Joyce Ajlouny, General Secretary
- Revenue: US$40.9 million
- Employees: 350
- Volunteers: thousands
- Award: Nobel Peace Prize (1947)
- Website: afsc.org

Designations

Pennsylvania Historical Marker
- Official name: American Friends Service Committee
- Type: City
- Criteria: Religion
- Designated: November 6, 1999
- Location: 1501 Cherry St., at Friends Ctr., Philadelphia; 39.95559°N 75.16477°W

The American Friends Service Committee (AFSC) is a Quaker-founded organization working for peace and social justice in the United States and around the world. AFSC was founded in 1917 as a combined effort by American members of the Religious Society of Friends to assist civilian victims of World War I. It continued to engage in relief action in Europe and the Soviet Union after the Armistice of 1918. By the mid-1920s, AFSC focused on improving racial relations, immigration policy, and labor conditions in the U.S., as well as exploring ways to prevent the outbreak of another conflict before and after World War II.

As the Cold War developed, the organization began to employ more professionals rather than Quaker volunteers. Over time, it broadened its appeal and began to respond more forcefully to racial injustice, international peacebuilding, migration and refugee issues, women's issues, and the demands of sexual minorities for equal treatment. Currently, the organization's three priorities include work on peacebuilding, a focus on just economies, and supporting refugees and migrants.

== Background ==
Quakers traditionally oppose violence in all of its forms and therefore many refuse to serve in the military, even when drafted. AFSC's original mission arose from the need to provide conscientious objectors (COs) with a constructive alternative to military service. In 1947, AFSC, along with its British counterpart, the Friends Service Council (now known as Quaker Peace and Social Witness), received the Nobel Peace Prize on behalf of all Quakers worldwide.

Established in 1917 by Friends from different branches of American Quakerism, AFSC is connected to the Religious Society of Friends through its official Corporation, which is established in the organization's bylaws: "The members of the Corporation shall be those persons, being members of the Religious Society of Friends, as may from time to time be appointed to membership in accordance with the provisions of these Bylaws." The members are a combination of "Yearly Meeting appointees" and "at-large members."

== History ==
In April 1917, just days after the United States entered World War I by declaring war on Germany and its allies, a group of Quakers met in Philadelphia to discuss the impending military draft and its impact on members of peace churches such as Quakers, Mennonites, Brethren, and the Amish. They developed ideas for alternative services that could be performed directly in the battle zones of northern France.

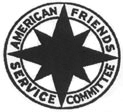
A historic AFSC logo

They also developed plans for dealing with the United States Army, since it had been inconsistent in its dealing with religious objectors to previous wars. Although legally members of pacifist churches were exempt from the draft, individual state draft boards interpreted the law in a variety of ways. Many Quakers and other COs were ordered to report to army camps for military service. Some COs, unaware of the significance of reporting for duty, found that this was interpreted by the military as a willingness to fight. One of the AFSC's first tasks was to identify COs, find the camps where they were located, and then visit them to provide spiritual guidance and moral support. In areas where the pacifist churches were more well known (such as Pennsylvania), a number of draft boards were willing to assign COs to AFSC for alternative service.

In addition to organizing alternative service programs for COs, AFSC collected relief in the form of food, clothing, and other supplies for displaced persons in France. Quakers were encouraged to donate old and make new garments; grow fruits and vegetables, can them, and send them to AFSC headquarters in Philadelphia. The AFSC then shipped these materials to France for distribution. Young men and women were sent to work in France alongside British Quakers, providing relief and medical care to refugees, repairing and rebuilding homes, assisting farmers in replanting fields damaged by the war, and founding a maternity hospital.

After World War I ended in 1918, AFSC expanded its work to Russia, Serbia, and Poland, assisting orphans and victims of famine and disease. In Germany and Austria, they established kitchens to feed hungry children. Eventually, AFSC was chartered by President Herbert Hoover to provide United States-sponsored relief to Germans.

In the 1920s, the American Friends Service Committee branched out to more domestic work in the United States. The Interracial Section was formed to improve race relations and civil rights. AFSC advocated for more inclusive immigration laws and opposed racial quotas. The organization also supported striking mine workers and helped unemployed individuals develop new skills, such as crafting furniture and other goods.

During the 1930s and through World War II, AFSC helped refugees escape Nazi Germany, focusing on those who were not being assisted by other organizations, primarily non-religious Jews and Jews married to non-Jews. AFSC also provided relief for children on both sides of the Spanish Civil War and supported refugees in Vichy France. Simultaneously, AFSC operated several Civilian Public Service camps for a new generation of COs. When Japanese Americans were forcibly relocated from the West Coast to inland concentration camps, AFSC led efforts to help college students transfer to schools in the Midwest and East Coast to avoid internment, and assisted Japanese Americans in resettling in various cities during and after the war. Following the war, AFSC engaged in relief and reconstruction work in Europe, Japan, India, and China.

In 1947, AFSC worked to resettle refugees during the partition of India. Between 1937 and 1943, the organization built the Penn-Craft community for unemployed coal miners in Fayette County, Pennsylvania.

Additionally in 1947, AFSC was awarded the Nobel Peace Prize in recognition of its war relief efforts. Shortly afterward, AFSC became one of the first non-governmental organizations to be given Consultative Status at the United Nations, leading to the establishment of the Quaker United Nations Office.

On December 7, 1948, UN Secretary-General Trygve Lie officially invited AFSC to participate in a one-year emergency relief program for Palestinians displaced by the creation of the state of Israel. The program had a budget of $32 million, with $16 million provided by the US. AFSC was given responsibility for the Gaza Strip, while displaced persons in Lebanon, Syria, and Jordan were allocated to the International Federation of Red Cross and Red Crescent Societies (IFRC) and those in the West Bank and Israel came under the care of the International Committee of the Red Cross (ICRC).

In the Gaza Strip, the Egyptian Army had established eight improvised refugee camps containing at least 200,000 people, mostly living in tents. Of these, 56% had come from Gaza District, and 42% from Lydda District. AFSC's responsibilities included food distribution, public health, and education. The program was managed by 50 volunteers, many from pacifist or CO backgrounds, and eventually employed over 1,000 Palestinians. One of the initial tasks was registering the refugees by their village of origin and establishing a rationing system, including a baby milk program. The goal was to provide each person with 2000 calories per day. Following this, AFSC established clinics for distributing medicines, conducted malaria control efforts, and organized water distribution.

By March 30, 1949, rudimentary schools had been established for 16,000 children. However, due to the absence of political progress on repatriation and limited resources, AFSC decided not to commit to a long-term aid program. In April 1950, they transferred their entire program to the newly created the United Nations Relief and Works Agency for Palestine Refugees in the Near East (UNRWA).

As the Cold War intensified, AFSC continued its relief and service efforts, often supporting civilians on both sides of conflicts around the world, including the Korean War, the Hungarian Revolution of 1956, the Algerian War, and the Nigerian-Biafran War.

During the Vietnam War, AFSC collaborated with U.S. scholars of China to organize conferences that sought to raise awareness about the U.S.'s non-recognition of the People's Republic of China. In 1966, AFSC developed programs to aid children and provided medical supplies and artificial limbs to civilians in both North and South Vietnam. When U.S. State Department approval to send medical supplies to North Vietnam was denied, the committee routed goods through Canada. AFSC also supported draft counseling for young American men throughout the conflict.

In 1955, AFSC published Speak Truth to Power: A Quaker Search for an Alternative to Violence, authored by a group including Stephen G. Cary, A. J. Muste, Robert Pickus, and Bayard Rustin. Focused on the Cold War, the 71-page pamphlet aimed to demonstrate "the effectiveness of love in human relations" and became a significant statement of Christian pacifism, receiving widespread commentary in both secular and religious press.

In the United States, AFSC supported the American Civil Rights Movement and advocated for the rights of African-Americans, Native Americans, Mexican Americans, and Asian Americans. Since the 1970s, AFSC has been heavily involved in the peace movement, particularly efforts to halt the production and deployment of nuclear weapons.

== Budget ==
In fiscal year 2022, AFSC had revenues of US$40.9 million and expenses of US$37.8 million. AFSC had net assets of US$166 million.

== Programs and projects ==
Today AFSC programs address a wide range of issues, countries, and communities. AFSC describes the programs as united by "the unfaltering belief in the essential worth of every human being, non-violence as the way to resolve conflict, and the power of love to overcome oppression, discrimination, and violence".

AFSC employs more than 350 staff working in dozens of programs throughout the United States and works in thirteen other nations. AFSC has divided the organization's programs between eight geographic regions, each of which runs programs related to peace, immigrant rights, restorative justice, economic justice, and climate justice. AFSC's international programs often work in conjunction with Quaker Peace and Social Witness (formerly the British Friends Service Council) and other partners.

AFSC also provides administrative support to the Quaker United Nations Office (QUNO) in New York City. This office is the official voice of Quakerism in the United Nations headquarters. There is a second QUNO office in Geneva, Switzerland; support for that office is provided by European Quakers. QUNO is overseen by the Friends World Committee for Consultation.

AFSC carries out many programs around the world. The organization's 2010 annual report describes work in several African countries, Haiti, Indonesia, and the United States. Recently AFSC opened a traveling art exhibit called Windows & Mirrors, examining the impact of the war in Afghanistan on civilians.

=== Eyes Wide Open project ===
In 2004, AFSC started the project Eyes Wide Open in Chicago. Eyes Wide Open is an exhibition on the human cost of the wars in Iraq and Afghanistan. The exhibit featured boots in a military array representing US deaths in both Iraq and Afghanistan, and shoes representing Iraqi and Afghan civilians. It was exhibited in 48 states and the District of Columbia, drawing national coverage

=== Current strategic focus ===
The American Friends Service Committee's strategic plan for 2020-2030 lists three interconnected strategic goals.

1. Just and Sustainable Peace - working for a future free of militarism and violence. Building conditions for peace, protecting civic space, and upholding human rights and dignity around the world. In the U.S., working to end reliance on criminalization and incarceration.
2. Just Economies - supporting initiatives and advocacy for access to food, housing, health care, and education and challenging inequality and corporate abuse of human rights.
3. Just Responses to Forced Displacement and Migration - offering legal services, training, human rights monitoring, and humanitarian relief and supporting migrant-led organizing and advocacy.

== Government monitoring ==
Throughout much of the group's history the US Federal Bureau of Investigation and other government agencies have monitored the work of this and many other similar organizations.

== Criticism ==
Since the 1970s, some criticism of the AFSC has come from liberals within the Society of Friends, who charge that the organization has drifted from its Quaker roots and has become indistinguishable from other political pressure groups. Quakers expressed concern with AFSC's abolition of their youth work camps during the 1960s and what some saw as a decline of Quaker participation in the organization.

In June 1979, a cover article in The New Republic attacked AFSC for abandoning the tradition of pacifism. The criticisms became prominent after a gathering of Friends General Conference (FGC) in Richmond, Indiana, in the summer of 1979 when many Friends joined with prominent leaders, such as Kenneth Boulding, to call for a firmer Quaker orientation toward public issues. After the FGC Gathering, a letter listing the points of criticism was signed by 130 Friends and sent to the AFSC Board. In 1988, the book Peace and Revolution by conservative scholar Guenter Lewy repeated charges that AFSC had abandoned pacifism and religion. In response to Lewy's book, Chuck Fager published Quaker Service at the Crossroads in 1988.

In 2010, Fager described that AFSC was "divorced" from Quakers' life as a faith community due to "an increasingly pronounced drift toward a lefty secularism" since the 1970s. It was reported that the Committee in 1975 adopted "a formal decision to make the Middle East its major issue".

Some Jewish supporters of Israeli government policies have accused AFSC of having an anti-Jewish bias. In 1993, Jacob Neusner called the Committee "the most militant and aggressive of Christian anti-Israel groups".

The AFSC's position on its website is that it "supports the use of boycott and divestment campaigns targeting only companies that support the occupation, settlements, militarism, or any other violations of international humanitarian or human rights law. Our position does not call for a full boycott of Israel or of companies because they are either Israeli or doing business in Israel. Our actions also never focus on individuals."

== See also ==
- Friends Committee on National Legislation (FCNL)
- List of anti-war organizations
- Pacifism in the United States
- Peace Testimony about the Quaker peace testimony
- Refugee workers in Vichy France
