= Alice Mary Hilton =

British-American mathematician, academic and author

- Born: June 18, 1919; Vienna
- Died: August 10, 2011 (aged 92); Manhattan
- Education: University of Oxford; UCLA
- Known for: Cyberculture; The Triple Revolution
- Scientific career
- Workplaces: Sorbonne University; Columbia University

Alice Mary Hilton (June 18, 1919 - August 10, 2011) was a British-American academic and author. She coined the term cyberculture in 1963. She served as president of The Institute for Cybercultural Research, which she founded, and of the Society for Social Responsibility in Science.

== Early life and education ==
Hilton was born in Vienna to Frederick O. Hilton and Thea von Weber. She studied classics, comparative literature and mathematics at the University of Oxford. She went on to earn a PhD in electrical engineering at University of California, Los Angeles. Here she took courses in mathematics. She was a postdoctoral scholar in the Sorbonne University, the Claremont Graduate University and Columbia University.

== Career ==
At first Hilton was optimistic that new technologies could help to eliminate poverty and cheap labour focused on repetitive tasks, but she became more wary of technology and increasingly pessimistic in the late 1960s as a result of the Vietnam War growing social unrest of that period. In 1963 Hilton created the term cyberculture. Cyberculture was defined by Hilton as "that way of life made possible when an entire process of production is carried out by systems of machines monitored and controlled by one computer". She described how, in the era of cyberculture, "plows pull themselves and the fried chickens fly right onto our plates". In the early 1960s Hilton published as series of essays entitled the Age of Cyberculture. She described how computers could someday become conscious, and that the interactions that take place in a human body could be performed by human-made circuits. Her first book, Logic, Computing Machines and automation was read by Bertrand Russell. She wrote about the need for science teachers to the dangers of modern science and technology, as well as their potential to build a new world. She maintained that a curriculum needed to be developed for the technological future.

"A new age is being born. In this century, humanity must prepare for the emerging cyberculture. Never has humanity had to make so many profound decisions in so short a time. Never has great civilisation been so attainable. Never has harmonious balance been so remote and never has balance been so desperately needed. The cybercultural revolution can create a world where machine systems produce undreamed of abundance, and where human beings live human lives, free to pursue human tasks."

In an article in the Michigan Quarterly Review, Hilton discussed the future of work in a world of automation. She was the first to point out that civil liberties, human rights and the economy are part of the cyberculture. She emphasised the needs for a "pattern for a world of leisure and abundance". She wrote about the need for an Ethos for the Age of Cyber Culture and for government involvement to develop a good cybercultural society. She delivered lectures on "The Human Spirit and the Cybercultural Revolution" around the United States. In 1964 Hilton founded The Institute for Cybercultural Research. The Institute for Cybercultural Research was a forum for the exchange of ideas about science and the future of work. The institute considered the immediate problems that might arise from the acceleration of technology and the need for ethics to be at the heart of new working conditions, as well as serving as a reliable source of information to government.

Hilton was a signatory on The Triple Revolution, a memorandum sent to Lyndon B. Johnson in 1964, to share concerns about "the cybernation generation". Hilton was one of two women signatories, the other being Frances W. Herring, a Professor of Government at University of California, Berkeley who led the 1961 Women Strike for Peace. In Cybernation and Civil Rights, a chapter in The Evolving Society, Hilton and Victor Paschkis called for an evaluation of what it meant to call machines intelligent. Paschkis, a mechanical engineer and Quaker, was the founder of the Society for Social Responsibility in Science. Hilton was described as "outstanding authority on computing machines and automation". In 1968 Hilton was made the vice president of the Society for Social Responsibility in Science. She became increasingly concerned for the underfed and under privileged in the developing world. She called for more to be done by socially conscious scientists.

In subsequent decades, she turned her attention to the mathematical history of architecture, with a focus on medieval cathedrals.

Hilton died in Manhattan on August 10, 2011.

=== Books ===
- Hilton, Alice Mary (1974). Against pollution and hunger : [proceedings of the International conference on pollution control, convened by the Society for Social Responsibility in Science, Trondheim, 1971]. Universitetsforlaget. OCLC 489187967.
- Hilton, Alice Mary (1967). The social implications of mechanization, automation, and cybernation in agriculture. OCLC 63619902.
- The Evolving Society: The Proceedings of the First Annual Conference on the Cybercultural Revolution – Cybernetics and Automation. 1966.
- Catalog of Copyright Entries. Third Series: 1963: January–June. Copyright Office, Library of Congress. 1964. "Logic, Computing Machines, and Automation"
