= Labor share =

Economics concept

In economics, the wage share or labor share is the part of national income, or the income of a particular economic sector, allocated to wages (labor). It is related to the capital or profit share, the part of income going to capital, which is also known as the K–Y ratio. The labor share is a key indicator for the distribution of income.

== Definition ==
Labor share of GDP

The wage share can be defined in various ways, but empirically it is usually defined as total labor compensation or labor costs over nominal GDP or gross value added.

Often the capital share and labor share are assumed to sum to 100%, so that each can be deduced from the other. For example, the Bureau of Labor Statistics defines the labor share in a given sector (LS) as the ratio of labor compensation paid in that sector (C) to current dollar output (CU), i.e. LS = C / CU. The non-labor or capital share (NLS) is defined as 1 − LS.

For the U.S. nonfarm business sector, BLS estimated that labor's share of output was 52.8 percent in the second quarter of 2026, the lowest reading in the series beginning in the first quarter of 1947. The quarterly estimate was published with revised productivity and cost data.

In Capital in the Twenty-First Century, Piketty described the accounting identity α = r × β as the 'first fundamental law of capitalism', where α represents the capital share, r is the rate of return on capital, and β is the capital to income ratio. Piketty defined the wage share as 1 − α.

Because the self-employed perform labor which is not rewarded with wages, the labor share may be underestimated in sectors with a high rate of self-employment. One approach is to assume the labor share of proprietors' income to be fixed. The OECD and the Bureau of Labor Statistics adjust labor compensation by assuming that the self-employed have the same average wage as employees in the same sector.

== History ==
The importance of the distribution of income between the factors of production – capital, land and labor – has long been recognized. Ricardo (1817) said that to determine the laws which regulate this distribution is the "principal problem in political economy".

Cobb and Douglas's Theory of Production (1928) introduced empirically determined constants α and β which corresponded to the capital and labor share respectively. Cobb and Douglas found that the wage share was about 75% in 1928. For most of the 20th century, constant labor share was a stylized fact known as Bowley's law.

== Changes in labor share ==
Historical measurements of the wage share can be charted using the Federal Reserve Bank of St. Louis's FRED tool, which includes time series published by the Bureau of Labor Statistics and Bureau of Economic Analysis.

Labor share in the United States relative to 1948; comparing time series from the Bureau of Labor Statistics and Bureau of Economic Analysis.

The wage share is countercyclical; that is, it tends to fall when output increases and rise when output decreases. Despite fluctuating over the business cycle, the wage share was once thought to be stable, which Keynes described as "one of the most surprising, yet best-established facts in the whole range of economic statistics". The wage share has declined in most developed countries since the 1980s.

Market concentration tends to reduce the labor share.

== See also ==
- Decoupling of wages from productivity
- Factors of production
- Factor shares
- Compensation of employees
- Measures of national income and output
- Value added
- Income distribution
- Labor economics
- Rate of exploitation
