= Arthur Lyon Bowley =

English statistician and economist

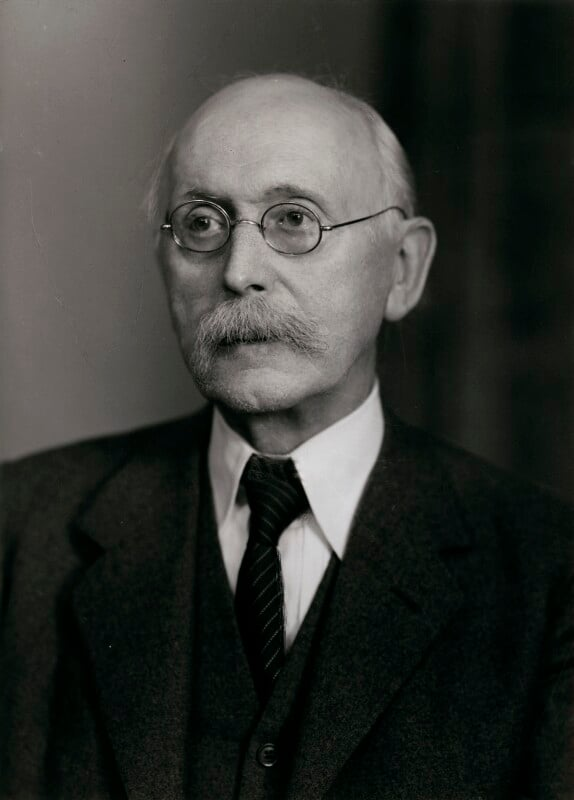
- Bowley in 1950
- Born: 6 November 1869; Bristol, England
- Died: 21 January 1957 (aged 87); Surrey, England
- Education: University of Cambridge
- Known for: Bowley's law
- Spouse: Julia Hilliam
- Children: 3
- Awards: CBE (1937) Guy Medal (silver, 1895) (Gold, 1935)
- Scientific career
- Fields: Statistics, Economics
- Workplaces: London School of Economics University College London

Sir Arthur Lyon Bowley, FBA (6 November 1869 – 21 January 1957) was an English statistician and economist who worked on economic statistics and pioneered the use of sampling techniques in social surveys.

== Early life ==
Bowley's father, James William Lyon Bowley, was a minister in the Church of England. He died at the age of 40 when Arthur was one, leaving Arthur's mother as mother or stepmother to seven children. Arthur was educated at Christ's Hospital, and won a scholarship to Trinity College, Cambridge to study mathematics. He graduated as Tenth Wrangler.

At Cambridge Bowley had a short course of study with the economist Alfred Marshall who had also been a Cambridge wrangler. Under Marshall's influence Bowley became an economic statistician. His Account of England's Foreign Trade won the Cobden Essay Prize and was published as a book. Marshall watched over Bowley's career, recommending him for jobs and offering him advice. Most notoriously Marshall told him the Elements of Statistics contained "too much mathematics."

== Academic career ==
After leaving Cambridge Bowley taught mathematics at St John's School in Leatherhead from 1893 to 1899. Meanwhile, he was publishing in economic statistics; his first article for the journal of the Royal Statistical Society) appeared in 1895. In that year the London School of Economics opened. Bowley was appointed as a part-time lecturer and he would be connected with the School until he retired in 1936. He can be considered one of the School's intellectual fathers. However, he continued to teach elsewhere; for more than a decade he taught at University College, Reading (now the University of Reading). He was the Newmarch lecturer at University College London (1897–98 and 1927–28). At the LSE he became Reader in 1908, and Professor in 1915. In 1919, he was appointed to a newly established Chair of Statistics, probably the first of its kind in Britain. In Bowley's time, however, the LSE statistics group was very small: Margaret Hogg arrived in 1919 and left for the United States in 1925, E. C. Rhodes arrived in 1924 and R. G. D. Allen in 1928. Bowley's students included Ronald George, Lewis Connor and Winifred Mackenzie, first recipient of the Frances Wood memorial prize. As a post-graduate student Josiah Stamp worked "nominally" under Bowley's supervision.

Bowley produced a stream of studies of British economic statistics, beginning in the 1890s with work on trade and on wages and income. His 1900 publication Wages in the United Kingdom in the Nineteenth Century was created using the unpaid assistance of Edith Marvin when she was a researcher at the London School of Economics. Proceeding to studies of national income in the 1920s and –30s. Especially noteworthy was his collaboration with Josiah Stamp on a comparison of the UK national income in 1911 and 1924. (Official national income statistics date only from the Second World War.) From around 1910 Bowley worked on social statistics as well. In aim, the work was a continuation of such surveys of social conditions as Charles Booth's "Life and Labour of the People in London" (1889–1903) and Seebohm Rowntree's "Poverty, A Study of Town Life" (1901). The methodological innovation was the use of sampling techniques. Bowley gave a detailed exposition of his approach to sampling in a 62-page paper published in 1926. The culmination of Bowley's work on social surveys was the monumental New Survey of London Life and Labour. Even in the 1930s his research could take a new direction, as when he collaborated with his junior colleague R. G. D. Allen on an econometric study of family expenditure. He retired in 1936 but served as acting Director of the Oxford University Institute of Statistics during the Second World War.

== Books ==
Bowley's "Elements of Statistics" is generally regarded as the first English-language statistics text-book. It described the techniques of descriptive statistics that would be useful for economists and social sciences, and in the early editions contained little statistical theory.

In statistical theory Bowley was not an innovator but drew on the writings of Karl Pearson, Udny Yule and F. Y. Edgeworth. In the 1930s, Bowley informed Fisher that "Professor Edgeworth had written a great deal on a kindred subject" and slapping Neyman down with "I am not at all sure that the 'confidence' [in confidence interval] is not a 'confidence trick.'"

Bowley's teaching presaged several of the EDA ideas later popularised by John Tukey, including stemplots, decile boxplots, the seven-figure summary and trimean.

Bowley's '"The Mathematical Groundwork of Economics'" was a notable attempt to provide the practising economist with the main ideas and techniques of mathematical economics; it was the first book in English of its kind. One of its successes was to bring the Edgeworth box to the attention of economists generally. Bowley was so successful that this is often referred to as the "Edgeworth-Bowley box". He also introduced the concept of conjectural variation into the theory of oligopoly in this book.

== Honours ==
Bowley received many honours. In 1922, he became Fellow of the British Academy, was appointed a CBE in 1937 and knighted in 1950. He served on the council of the Royal Economic Society and was president of the Econometric Society 1938–9. The Royal Statistical Society awarded him its Guy Medal in Gold in 1935 and he served as its president 1938–40.

== Personal life ==
According to Allen and George, "In personality Bowley was somewhat shy and retiring. He did not readily make friends and his close friendship with Edwin Cannan over many years was an almost unique experience." They recall an anecdote about an occasion when Bowley and Cannan were cycling with Francis Edgeworth. When Edgeworth wanted to discuss a mathematical question Cannan said, "Bowley, let us go a little faster, Edgeworth cannot talk mathematics at more than eight miles an hour."

Bowley married Julia Hilliam in 1904 and the couple had three daughters. His daughter, Marian Bowley, also had an academic career in economics.

== Bowley's law ==
Bowley formulated Bowley's law, which says that the proportion of GNP from labour is constant.

== Main publications of A. L. Bowley ==
- A Short Account of England's Foreign Trade in the Nineteenth Century, 1893.
- Wages and Income in the United Kingdom Since 1860, 1900.
- Elements of Statistics, 1901. (4th edition in 1920)
- An Elementary Manual of Statistics, 1910.
- Livelihood and Poverty: a study in the economic conditions of working-class households, with A.R. Bennett-Hurst, 1915.
- The Division of the Product of Industry, 1919
- The Mathematical Groundwork of Economics, 1924.
- Has Poverty Diminished? , with M.Hogg, 1925.
- Measurement of Precision attained in Sampling, Bulletin de l'Institut International de Statistique,(1926) 22, Suppl. to Book 1, 1–62. Gallica (after p. 451)
- The National Income 1924 with J. Stamp, 1927.
- Bilateral Monopoly, 1928, Economic Journal.
- F. Y. Edgeworth's Contributions to Mathematical Statistics, 1928.
- New Survey of London Life and Labour, 1930–35.
- Family Expenditure with R.G.D. Allen, 1935.
- Three Studies in National Income, 1939.

== Discussions ==
- Allen, R.D.G.; George, R. F. (1957). "Obituary of Professor Sir Arthur Bowley". Journal of the Royal Statistical Society, Series A. 102: 236–241.
- W F Maunder and Sir Arthur Lyon Bowley (1869–1957) in Studies in the History of Statistics Probability, (ed. E S Pearson and M G Kendall) 1970. London: Griffin.
- Darnell, A. (1981), "A.L. Bowley, 1969-1957", in O'Brien, D. P.; Presley, J. R. (eds.), Pioneers of Modern Economics in Britain, London: Macmillan, pp. 140–174, ISBN 9780333231753.
- Bowley, Arthur Lyon, pp. 277–9 in Leading Personalities in Statistical Sciences from the Seventeenth Century to the Present, (ed. N. L. Johnson and S. Kotz) 1997. New York: Wiley. Originally published in Encyclopedia of Statistical Science.

== See also ==
- Stem-and-leaf display attributed to Bowley's work
