= Winifred Mackenzie =

English statistician

Winifred Alice Mackenzie (21 November 1896 – 29 November 1954) was an English statistician, pupil of Arthur Bowley, first winner of the Royal Statistical Society’s Frances Wood Memorial Prize and Ronald Fisher’s first assistant in the Statistics Department at Rothamsted Experimental Station. She was subsequently a missionary in the Belgian Congo.

== Early life ==
Winifred was born in London, the fifth of six girls. Her father, Samuel Henry Mackenzie, had a cutlers and jewellery shop and, before marrying, her mother, Louisa (née Chatterton), had worked in the Civil Service Telegraph Department. Winifred attended the highly regarded North London Collegiate School founded by Frances Buss whose then headmistress was the mathematician Sophie Bryant. The statistician Clara Collet was an earlier student.

In 1916 Winifred went to the London School of Economics (LSE) and studied statistics under the economic statistician Arthur Bowley. In 1921 she published an essay on a favourite Bowley theme, the standard of living of the working classes. For this she was awarded the Frances Wood Memorial Prize. In 1924 she received a Master of Science (Economics) from the LSE.

== Career ==
=== Rothamsted Experimental Station ===
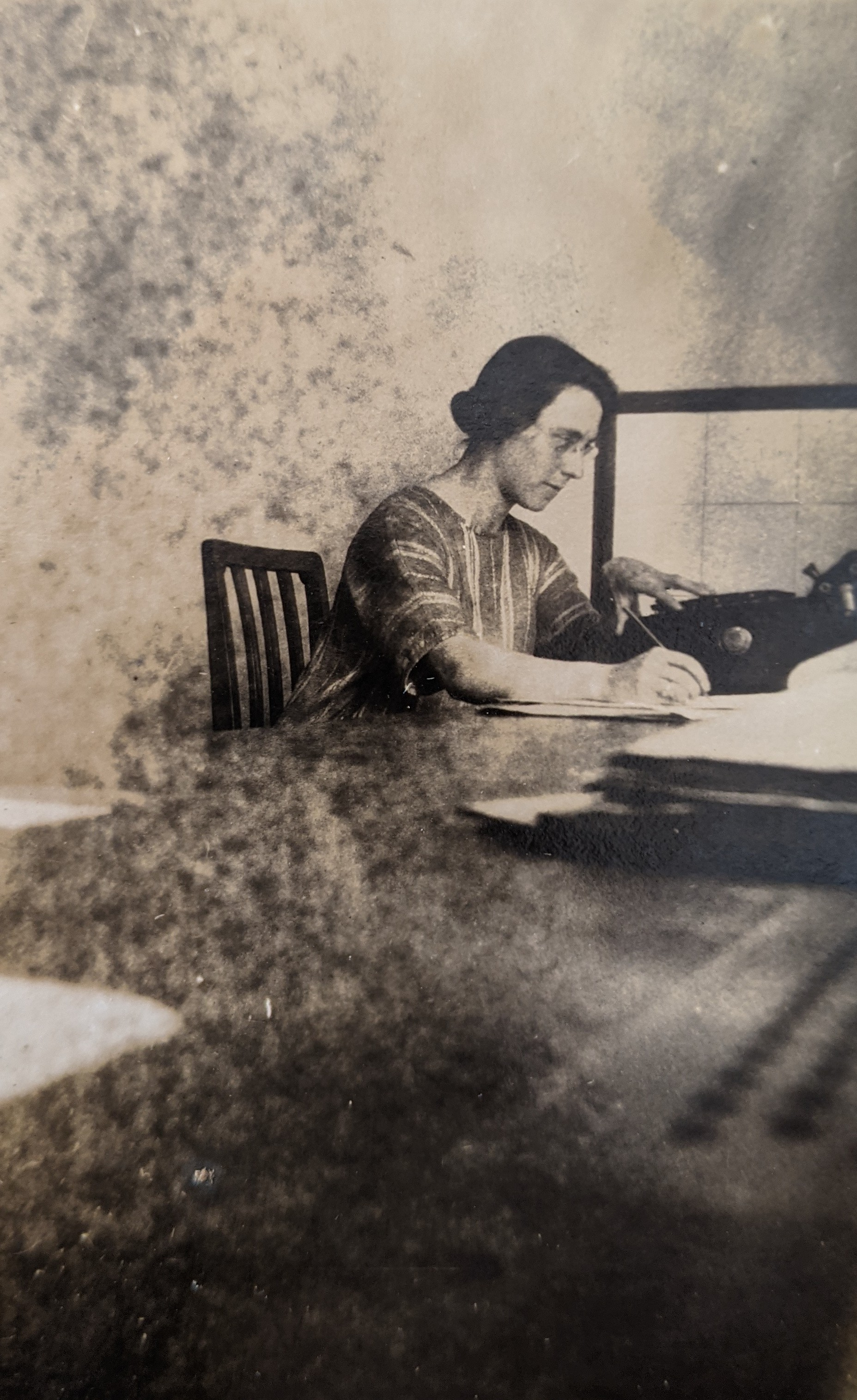
Winifred Mackenzie computing at Rothamsted

In 1919 Ronald Fisher joined Rothamsted Experimental Station. He was new to agricultural statistics and devised many new procedures. He recruited Mackenzie as his assistant and in 1922 she contributed to two papers: Fisher and Mackenzie (1922) on the analysis of rainfall correlations using harmonic analysis and Fisher, Thornton and Mackenzie (1922) on the analysis of bacterial counts using the Poisson distribution. Fisher and Mackenzie (1923) with its early presentation of the analysis of variance followed. In these early papers Winifred provided the computing—learning Fisher’s methods by implementing them. By 1924 she was ready to work alone, applying to barley techniques Fisher had devised for wheat. The project was not completed when she left and the work was taken over by Wishart.

=== Missionary work in the Congo ===
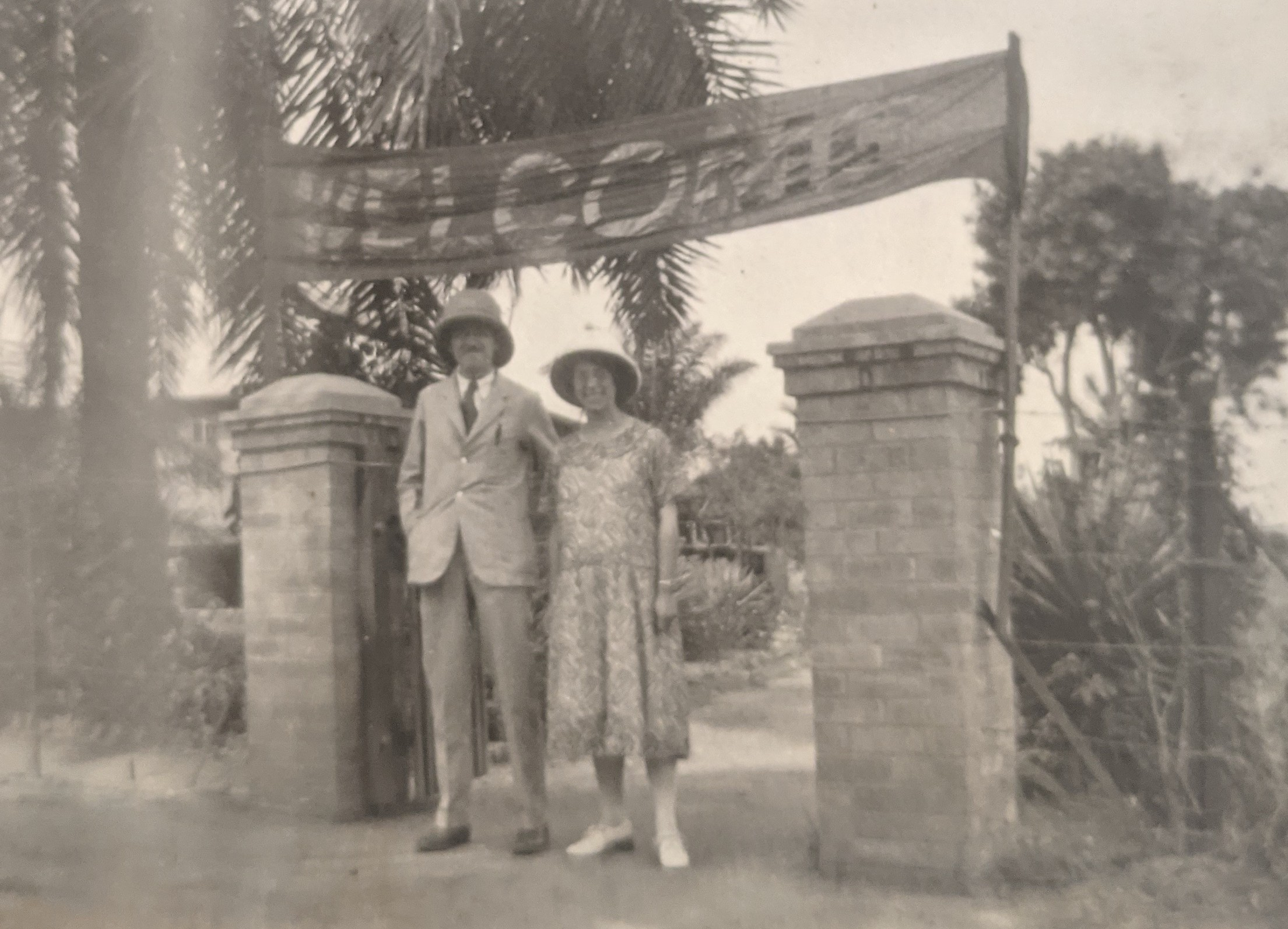
Winifred and Trevor Tyrrell arriving at Bolobo in 1927

In 1927 the statistical career of Winifred Alice Mackenzie ended when she married the missionary Trevor Grahame Rupert Tyrrell (1896–1968). Tyrrell was a descendant of the balloonist Margaret Graham. After war service in the Royal Army Medical Corps, Tyrrell was ordained and went to the Belgian Congo with the Baptist Missionary Society. Winifred joined in this work which was based on the BMS station at Bolobo established forty years earlier by the explorer and missionary George Grenfell. Their work was not wholly religious for the Belgian authorities left medicine and education and even the administration of justice to the missions. Winifred learned the local tribal tongues and worked on educating the women and girls—even setting up Girl Guides units on the English model.

== Personal life ==
Winifred and Trevor had five children, Michael, Donald, Ursula, Alan and Phyllis between 1928 and 1937, two born in the Congo and three in England. The BMS scheme for family life was for the parents to stay on station while the children went to boarding school in England but, with the approach of the Second World War, Winifred and Trevor decided that she and the children should settle in England. Trevor stayed in the Congo until 1952 moving to a ministry in Ludlow, Shropshire. Winifred died in 1954, having been ill for several years.

== Publications ==
- Mackenzie, W. A. (1921) Changes in the Standard of Living in the United Kingdom, 1860–1914, Economica, No. 3 (Oct.), 211–230.
- Fisher, R. A. and W. A. Mackenzie (1922) The Correlation of Weekly Rainfall. Quarterly Journal of the Royal Meteorological Society, 48, (July), 234–242.
- Fisher, R. A., H. G. Thornton and W. A. Mackenzie (1922) The Accuracy of the Plating Method of Estimating the Density of Bacterial Populations, Annals of Applied Biology, 9, 325–359.
- Fisher, R. A. and W. A. Mackenzie (1923) Studies in Crop Variation. II. The Manurial Response of Different Potato Varieties, Journal of Agricultural Science, 13, (3), 311–320.
- Mackenzie, W. A. (1924) Studies in Crop Variation. III. An Examination of the Yield of Dressed Grain from Hoos Field, Journal of Agricultural Science, 14, (3), 434–460.
- Mackenzie, W. A. (1926) Note on a Remarkable Correlation between Grain and Straw, obtained at Rothamsted, Journal of Agricultural Science, 16, (2), 275–279.
- Wishart, J. and W. A. Mackenzie (1930) Studies in Crop Variation VII. The Influence of Rainfall on the Yield of Barley at Rothamsted Journal of Agricultural Science, 20, (3), 417–439.
