= Ramallah Subdistrict, Mandatory Palestine =

Administrative division of British Palestine (1920–1948)

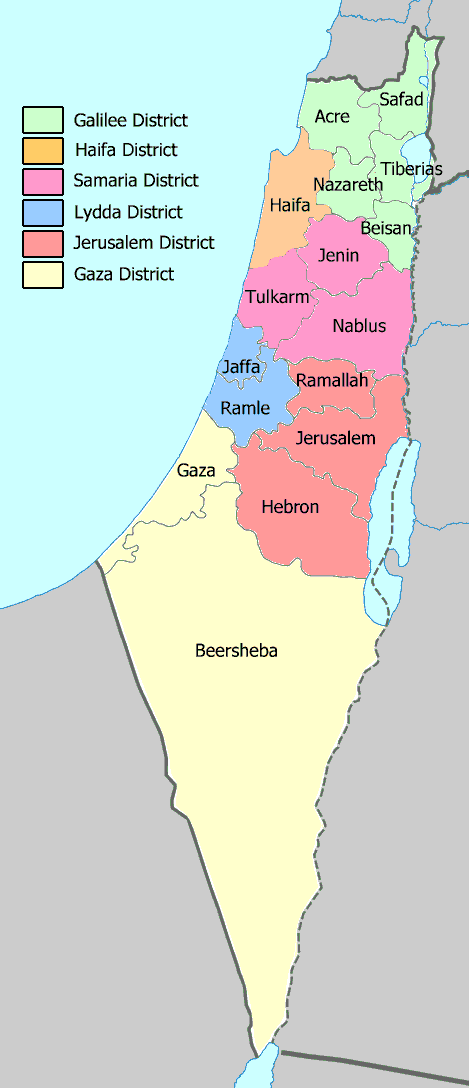
Subdistricts grouped by districts in 1945. Jerusalem District with Ramallah Subdistrict in red.

The Ramallah Subdistrict was one of the subdistricts of Mandatory Palestine. It was located around the city of Ramallah. After the 1948 Arab–Israeli War, the district was replaced by new Jordanian borders.

== Towns and villages ==
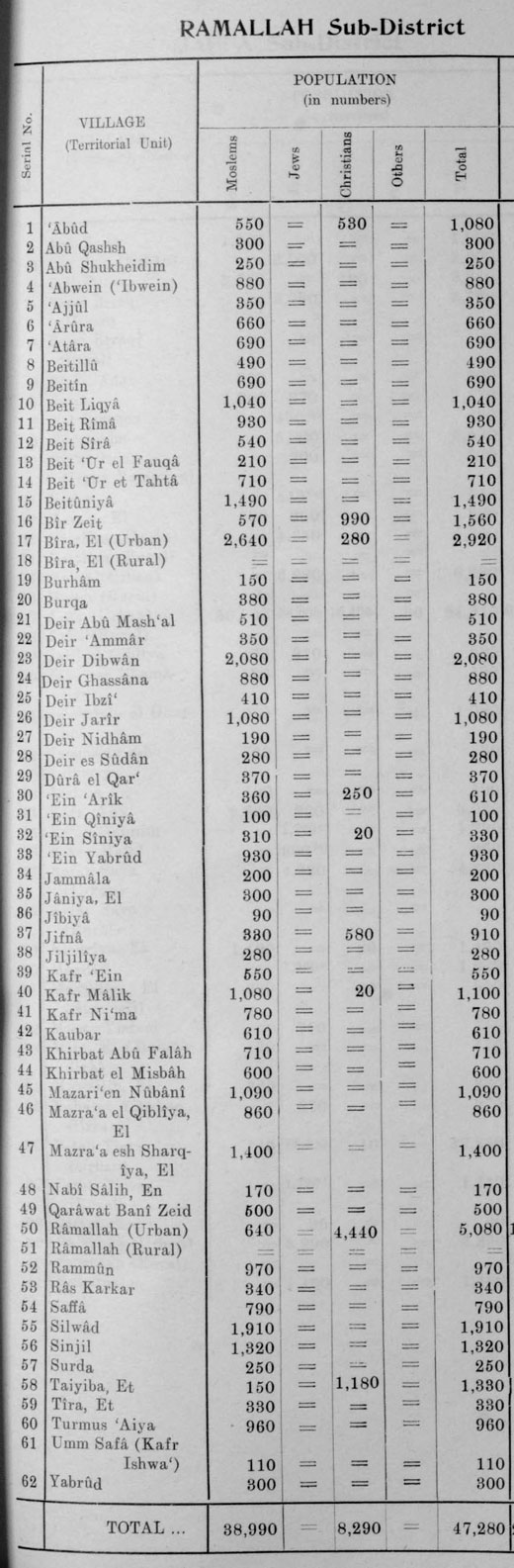
Official population statistics for the sub-district, from Village Statistics, 1945.

Ramallah Sub-District – Population by Village
Village	Muslims	Jews	Christians	Others	Total
‘Abud	550		530		1,080
Abu Qashsh	300				300
Abu Shukheidim	250				250
‘Abwein (Ibwein)	880				880
‘Ajjul	350				350
‘Arura	660				660
‘Atara	690				690
Beitillu	490				490
Beitin	690				690
Beit Liqya	1,040				1,040
Beit Rima	930				930
Beit Sira	540				540
Beit ‘Ur el Fauqa	210				210
Beit ‘Ur et Tahta	710				710
Beituniya	1,490				1,490
Bir Zeit	570		990		1,560
Bira (El) (Urban)	2,640		280		2,920
Bira (El) (Rural)					
Burham	150				150
Burqa	380				380
Deir Abu Mash‘al	510				510
Deir ‘Ammar	350				350
Deir Dibwan	2,080				2,080
Deir Ghassana	880				880
Deir Ibzi‘	410				410
Deir Jarir	1,080				1,080
Deir Nidham	190				190
Deir es Sudan	280				280
Dur‘a el Qari‘	370				370
‘Ein ‘Arik	360		250		610
‘Ein Qiniya	100				100
‘Ein Siniya	310		20		330
‘Ein Yabrud	930				930
Jammala	200				200
Janiya (El)	300				300
Jibiya	90				90
Jifna	330		580		910
Jiljiliya	280				280
Kafr ‘Ein	550				550
Kafr Malik	1,080		20		1,100
Kafr Ni‘ma	780				780
Kaubar	610				610
Khirbat Abu Falah	710				710
Khirbat el Misbah	600				600
Mazari‘ el ‘Urbani	1,090				1,090
Mazra‘a el Qibliya (El)	860				860
Mazra‘a esh Sharqiya (El)	1,400				1,400
Nabi Salih (En)	170				170
Qarawat Bani Zeid	500				500
Ramallah (Urban)	640		4,440		5,080
Ramallah (Rural)					
Rammun	970				970
Ras Karkar	340				340
Saffa	790				790
Silwad	1,910				1,910
Sinjil	1,320				1,320
Surda	250				250
Taiyiba (Et)	150		1,180		1,330
Tira (Et)	330				330
Turmus ‘Ayya	960				960
Umm Safa (Kafr Ishwa‘)	110				110
Yabrud	300				300
TOTAL	38,990	—	8,290	—	47,280
