= Bowley's law =

Stylized fact of economics

Bowley's law, also known as the law of the constant wage share, is a stylized fact of economics which states that the wage share of a country, i.e., the share of a country's economic output that is given to employees as compensation for their work (usually in the form of wages), remains constant over time. It is named after the English economist Arthur Bowley. Research conducted near the start of the 21st century, however, found wage share to have declined since the 1980s in most major economies.

== Origins ==
The term Bowley's law was first used by Paul Samuelson in 1964 in the sixth American edition of his classic textbook Economics as a name for the stylized fact of a constant wage share. Thereby, Samuelson meant to honor the economist Arthur Bowley, who pioneered the collection and statistical analysis of wage data in the UK. Having already speculated in 1920 that the wage share might be constant and having found (together with Josiah Stamp) evidence for his speculation in a comparison between the UK's wage shares in 1911 and 1924, Bowley became the first to clearly assert the constancy of the wage share in his 1937 book Wages and Income in the United Kingdom since 1860. This finding was remarkably at odds with the teachings of classical economists like Ricardo who perceived the factor shares of land, capital, and labor to be inherently flexible.

== Research ==
Since its beginnings in the 1920s, empirical research on the distribution of factor shares has been intimately tied to the development of national accounting. Due to the necessity of aggregating wage data from different sources, many early studies on the growth or decline of the wage share, including Bowley's and Kalecki's research in the 1930s, were fraught with measurement and comparability issues. As national accounting in Great Britain and the United States improved, studies such as Phelps-Brown and Weber (1953) or Johnson (1954) found wage shares to be constant. As a consequence, the constancy of the wage share was widely accepted as stylized fact among economists, e.g. becoming part of Kaldor's facts on modern economic growth. This consensus met strong empirical challenges in the late 1950s, e.g. from Kuznets (1959) or Solow (1959). Even though academic interest in Bowley's law waned from the 1960s on, its impact on economic theory was profound. Through its influence on the macroeconomic research of Kalecki and Keynes, it influenced Post-Keynesian economists like Joan Robinson who developed macroeconomic theories able to account for the existence of a constant wage share. Analogously, Bowley's law is reflected in the development of neoclassical wage theory by John Hicks and Paul Douglas in the 1930s. Perhaps most importantly, the inclusion of Bowley's law as one of Kaldor's facts, which neoclassical macroeconomics seek to explain, implies that it considerably shaped the development of modern economic theory.

Only in the early 2000s did academic interest in Bowley's law begin to resurface. Since then a substantial body of economic research has cast strong doubts on whether Bowley's law holds in post-1960 data. More specifically, recent research strongly suggests that in most major economies, including the U.S., the wage share has substantially and significantly declined since the 1980s.

== Sources ==
- Bowley, A. L. (1900). Wages in the United Kingdom in the Nineteenth Century: Notes for the Use of Students of Social and Economic Questions. Cambridge, UK: Cambridge University Press.
- Bowley, A. L. (1937). Wages and Income in the United Kingdom Since 1860. Cambridge: Cambridge University Press.
