= Nablus Subdistrict, Mandatory Palestine =

Administrative division of British Palestine (1920–1948)

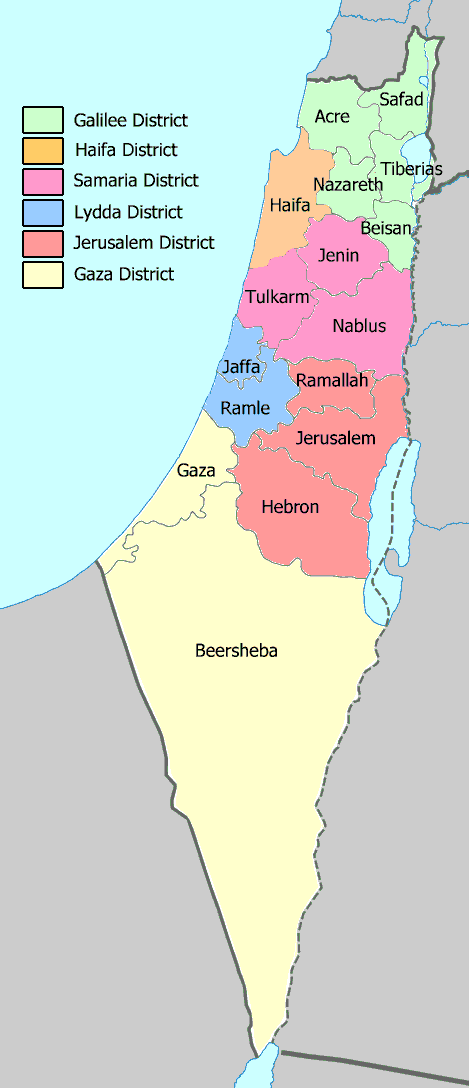
Subdistricts grouped by districts in 1945. Samaria District with Nablus Subdistrict in purple.

The Nablus Subdistrict was one of the subdistricts of Mandatory Palestine. It was located around the city of Nablus. After the 1948 Arab–Israeli War, the district was replaced by new Jordanian borders.

== Towns and villages ==
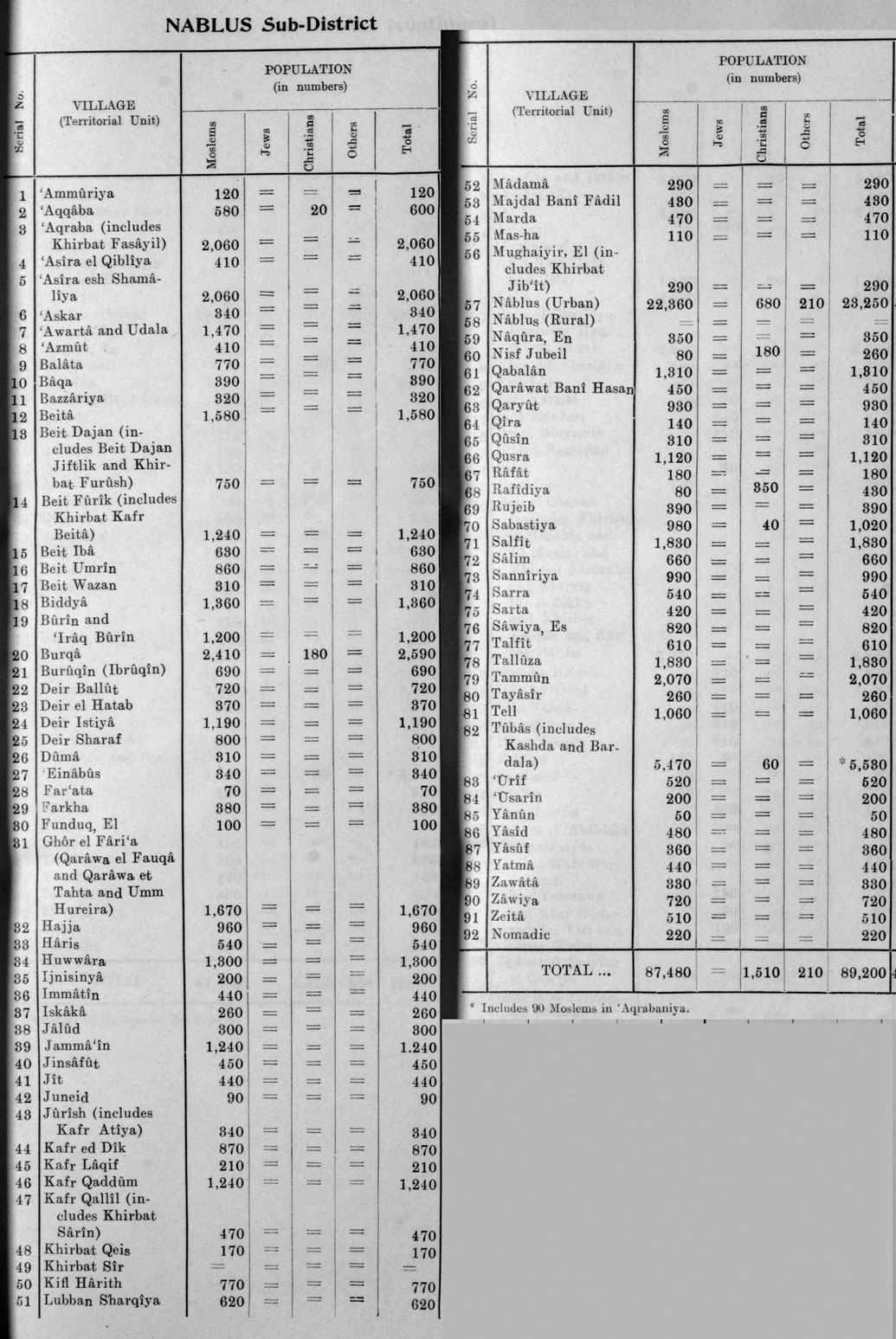
Official population statistics for the sub-district, from Village Statistics, 1945.

Nablus Sub-District – Population by Village
Village	Muslims	Jews	Christians	Others	Total
‘Ammuriya	120				120
‘Aqqaba	580		20		600
‘Aqraba (includes Khirbat Fasayil)	2,060				2,060
‘Asira el Qibliya	410				410
‘Asira esh Shamaliya	2,060				2,060
‘Askar	340				340
‘Awarta and Udala	1,470				1,470
‘Azmut	410				410
Balata	770				770
Baqa	390				390
Bazzariya	320				320
Beita	1,580				1,580
Beit Dajan (includes Beit Dajan Jiftlik and Khirbat Furush)	750				750
Beit Furik (includes Khirbat Kafr Beita)	1,240				1,240
Beit Iba	630				630
Beit Umrin	860				860
Beit Wazan	310				310
Bidya	1,360				1,360
Burin and ‘Iraq Burin	1,200				1,200
Buraq	2,410		180		2,590
Buruqin (Ibruqin)	690				690
Deir Ballut	720				720
Deir el Hatab	370				370
Deir Istiya	1,190				1,190
Deir Sharaf	800				800
Duma	310				310
‘Einabus	340				340
Far‘ata	70				70
Farkha	380				380
Funduq (El)	100				100
Ghor el Fari‘a (Qarawa el Fauqa, Qarawa et Tahta and Umm Hureira)	1,670				1,670
Hajjah	960				960
Haris	540				540
Huwwara	1,300				1,300
Jinsiniya	200				200
Immatin	440				440
Iskaka	260				260
Jalud	300				300
Jamma‘in	1,240				1,240
Jinsafut	450				450
Jit	440				440
Juneid	90				90
Jurish (includes Kafr Atiya)	340				340
Kafr ed Dik	870				870
Kafr Laqif	210				210
Kafr Qaddum	1,240				1,240
Kafr Qallil (includes Khirbat Sarin)	470				470
Khirbat Qeis	170				170
Khirbat Sir					
Kifl Harith	770				770
Lubban Sharqiya	620				620
Madama	290				290
Majdal Bani Fadil	430				430
Marda	470				470
Mas-ha	110				110
Mughayyir (El) (includes Khirbat Jib‘it)	290				290
Nablus (Urban)	22,360		680	210	23,250
Nablus (Rural)					
Naqura (En)	350				350
Nisf Jubeil	80		180		260
Qabalan	1,310				1,310
Qarawat Bani Hasan	450				450
Qaryut	930				930
Qira	140				140
Qusin	310				310
Qusra	1,120				1,120
Rafat	180				180
Rafidiya	80		350		430
Rujeib	390				390
Sabastiya	980		40		1,020
Salfit	1,830				1,830
Salim	660				660
Samiriya	990				990
Sarra	540				540
Sarta	420				420
Sawiya (Es)	820				820
Talfit	610				610
Talluza	1,830				1,830
Tammun	2,070				2,070
Tayasir	260				260
Tell	1,060				1,060
Tubas (includes Kashda and Bardala)	5,470		60		5,530
‘Urif	520				520
‘Usarin	200				200
Yanun	50				50
Yasid	480				480
Yusuf	360				360
Yatma	440				440
Zawata	330				330
Zawiya	720				720
Zeita	510				510
Nomadic	220				220
TOTAL	87,480	—	1,510	210	89,200
