= Districts of Mandatory Palestine =

Administrative divisions of Palestine (1920–1948)

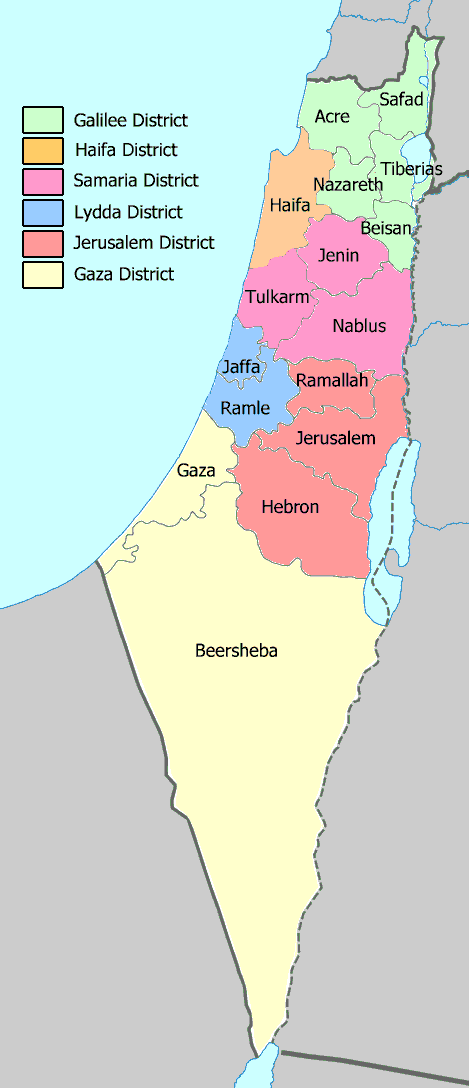
- Category: District
- Location: Mandatory Palestine
- Created: 1922
- Abolished: 1948
- Number: 6 (as of 1945)
- Government: District Commissioner
- Subdivisions: Sub-district, division

The districts and sub-districts of Mandatory Palestine formed the first and second levels of administrative division and existed through the whole era of Mandatory Palestine, namely from 1920 to 1948. The number and territorial extent of the districts varied over time, as did their subdivision into sub-districts.

In Arabic, a district was known as a minṭaqah (منطقة, plural manaṭiq مناطق), while in Hebrew it was known as a mahoz (מחוז, plural mehozot מחוזות).

Each district had an administration headed by a district governor, a role renamed as district commissioner in 1925. Sub-districts were managed by an assistant district commissioner. They were aided by a district officer, who was typically either Arab or Jewish, based on the ethnic make-up of the sub-district.

By the end of the mandate period, Palestine was divided into 6 districts and 16 subdistricts.

== Administrative divisions prior to 1922 ==
During the Ottoman period, Palestine was divided into different provinces, each centered around a main city: Safed, Acre, Nablus, Jerusalem and Gaza. These provinces contained sub-districts centered around provincial towns. For example, during the 18th and 19th centuries, sub-district of Lod encompassed the area between Modi'in-Maccabim-Re'ut in the south to the present-day city of El'ad in the north, and from the foothills in the east, through the Lod Valley to the outskirts of Jaffa in the west. This area was home to thousands of inhabitants in about 20 villages, who had at their disposal tens of thousands of hectares of prime agricultural land.

Until June 1920, Palestine was under a formal military regime called O.E.T.A. (South). Initially the country was divided into 13 administrative districts, reduced to 10 in 1919, each under a military government.

At the start of 1920 there were 9 districts: Jerusalem, Jaffa, Hebron, Jenin, Safed, Acre, Tiberias, Tulkarem and Beersheba, but this division was modified by the following month to Jerusalem, Haifa, Hebron, Jenin, Nablus, Safed, Acre, Tiberias, Galilee, Tulkarem and Beersheba.

The division was revised after the adoption of a civilian administration in the middle of 1920. In September 1920, the districts were Jerusalem, Galilee, Phoenicia (formerly Haifa), Samaria, Jaffa, Gaza and Beersheva.

== Administrative divisions in 1922 ==
In July 1922, administrations of the districts of Phoenicia and Galilee were combined, as were the districts of Jerusalem and Jaffa, and the districts of Gaza and Beersheba. Some reassignment of sub-districts also occurred.

At the time of the October, 1922, census of Palestine, there were four districts divided into 18 sub-districts.

- Southern District
  - Beersheba Sub-district
  - Gaza Sub-district
  - Hebron Sub-district
- Jerusalem-Jaffa District
  - Bethlehem Sub-district
  - Jaffa Division

- Jaffa Sub-district
- Ramleh Sub-district

- Jericho Sub-district
- Jerusalem Sub-district
- Ramallah Sub-district

- Samaria District
  - Baisan Sub-district
  - Jenin Sub-district
  - Nablus Sub-district
  - Tulkarem Sub-district
- Northern District
  - Acre Sub-district
  - Haifa Sub-district
  - Nazareth Sub-district
  - Safad Sub-district
  - Tiberias Sub-district

== Administrative divisions in 1924–1925 ==
A proclamation of June 1924 divided the country into three districts with 18 sub-districts.

- Southern District
  - Beersheba Sub-district
  - Gaza Sub-district
  - Hebron Sub-district
- Jerusalem-Jaffa District
  - Jerusalem Division
    - Bethlehem Sub-district
    - Jericho Sub-district
    - Jerusalem Sub-district
    - Ramallah Sub-district
  - Jaffa Division
    - Jaffa Sub-district
    - Ramleh Sub-district
- Northern District
  - Acre Sub-district
  - Baisan Sub-district
  - Haifa Sub-district
  - Jenin Sub-district
  - Nablus Sub-district
  - Nazareth Sub-district
  - Safad Sub-district
  - Tiberias Sub-district
  - Tulkarem Sub-district

In August 1925, the Southern and Jerusalem-Jaffa Districts were combined into the Jerusalem-Southern District.

== Administrative divisions in 1927 ==
In July 1927, the divisions were proclaimed to consist of two districts and one division, divided into 18 sub-districts.

- Southern District
  - Beersheba Sub-district
  - Gaza Sub-district
  - Hebron Sub-district
  - Jaffa Sub-district
  - Ramleh Sub-district
- Jerusalem Division
  - Bethlehem Sub-district
  - Jericho Sub-district
  - Jerusalem Sub-district
  - Ramallah Sub-district
- Northern District
  - Acre Sub-district
  - Baisan Sub-district
  - Haifa Sub-district
  - Jenin Sub-district
  - Nablus Sub-district
  - Nazareth Sub-district
  - Safad Sub-district
  - Tiberias Sub-district
  - Tulkarem Sub-district

== Administrative divisions in 1931 ==
In October 1931, the Hebron Sub-district was combined with the Jerusalem Division to form the Jerusalem District. This was the subdivision at the time of the November 1931 census of Palestine.

- Southern District
  - Beersheba Sub-district
  - Gaza Sub-district
  - Jaffa Sub-district
  - Ramleh Sub-district
- Jerusalem District
  - Bethlehem Sub-district
  - Hebron Sub-district
  - Jericho Sub-district
  - Jerusalem Sub-district
  - Ramallah Sub-district
- Northern District
  - Acre Sub-district
  - Baisan Sub-district
  - Haifa Sub-district
  - Jenin Sub-district
  - Nablus Sub-district
  - Nazareth Sub-district
  - Safad Sub-district
  - Tiberias Sub-district
  - Tulkarem Sub-district

== Administrative divisions in 1937 ==
In July 1937, but not gazetted until October, the Administrative Divisions (Amendment) Proclamation divided the Northern District into two districts.

- Southern District
  - Beersheba Sub-district
  - Gaza Sub-district
  - Jaffa Sub-district
  - Ramleh Sub-district
- Jerusalem District
  - Bethlehem Sub-district
  - Hebron Sub-district
  - Jericho Sub-district
  - Jerusalem Sub-district
  - Ramallah Sub-district
- Haifa and Samaria District
  - Haifa Sub-district
  - Jenin Sub-district
  - Nablus Sub-district
  - Tulkarm Sub-district
- Galilee and Acre District
  - Acre Sub-district
  - Baisan Sub-district
  - Nazareth Sub-district
  - Safad Sub-district
  - Tiberias Sub-district

== Administrative divisions in 1938–1940 ==
In 1938, the Beersheba and Gaza sub-districts were separated from the Southern District. Then in 1939, the Administrative Division (Amendment) Proclamation reshaped the country into six districts. The name of the Galilee and Acre District was changed to Galilee District in December. Some minor adjustments were made in December 1940.

- Gaza District
  - Beersheba Sub-district
  - Gaza Sub-district
- Lydda District
  - Jaffa Sub-district
  - Ramleh Sub-district
- Jerusalem District
  - Bethlehem Sub-district
  - Hebron Sub-district
  - Jericho Sub-district
  - Jerusalem Sub-district
  - Ramallah Sub-district
- Samaria District
  - Jenin Sub-district
  - Nablus Sub-district
  - Tulkarm Sub-district
- Haifa District
  - Haifa Sub-district
- Galilee District
  - Acre Sub-district
  - Baisan Sub-district
  - Nazareth Sub-district
  - Safad Sub-district
  - Tiberias Sub-district

== Administrative divisions in 1942–1948 ==
Palestine Sub-district definition 1947. Boundaries followed the village land boundaries.

The Administrative Divisions (Amendment) Proclamation, 1942 reduced the number of sub-districts of the Jerusalem District to three, merging the Bethlehem and Jericho sub-districts into the Jerusalem sub-district. Further minor adjustments were made in 1945 and 1947. This division was retained by the State of Israel until 1953, where district boundaries were redrawn to their modern form.

- Gaza District
  - Beersheba Sub-district
  - Gaza Sub-district
- Lydda District
  - Jaffa Sub-district
  - Ramle Sub-district
- Jerusalem District
  - Hebron Sub-district
  - Jerusalem Sub-district
  - Ramallah Sub-district
- Samaria District
  - Jenin Sub-district
  - Nablus Sub-district
  - Tulkarm Sub-district
- Haifa District
  - Haifa Sub-district
- Galilee District
  - Acre Sub-district
  - Beisan Sub-district
  - Nazareth Sub-district
  - Safad Sub-district
  - Tiberias Sub-district

== See also ==
- Governorates of Palestine
- Districts of Israel
