= Stem-and-leaf display =

Format for presentation of quantitative data

A stem-and-leaf plot of prime numbers under 100 shows that the most frequent tens digits are 0 and 1 while the least is 9

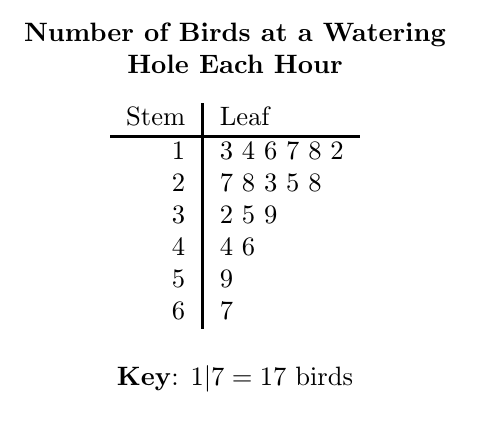
Stem and leaf diagram (a.k.a stemplot) representing the number of birds at a watering hole each hour.

A stem-and-leaf display or stem-and-leaf plot is a device for presenting quantitative data in a graphical format, similar to a histogram, to assist in visualizing the shape of a distribution. They evolved from Arthur Bowley's work in the early 1900s, and are useful tools in exploratory data analysis. Stemplots became more commonly used in the 1980s after the publication of John Tukey's book on exploratory data analysis in 1977. The popularity during those years is attributable to their use of monospaced (typewriter) typestyles that allowed computer technology of the time to easily produce the graphics. Modern computers' superior graphic capabilities have meant these techniques are less often used.

This plot has been implemented in Octave and R.

A stem-and-leaf plot is also called a stemplot, but the latter term often refers to another chart type. A simple stem plot may refer to plotting a matrix of y values onto a common x axis, and identifying the common x value with a vertical line, and the individual y values with symbols on the line.

Unlike histograms, stem-and-leaf displays retain the original data to at least two significant digits, and put the data in order, thereby easing the move to order-based inference and non-parametric statistics.

== Construction ==
To construct a stem-and-leaf display, the observations must first be sorted in ascending order: this can be done most easily if working by hand by constructing a draft of the stem-and-leaf display with the leaves unsorted, then sorting the leaves to produce the final stem-and-leaf display. Here is the sorted set of data values that will be used in the following example:

44, 46, 47, 49, 63, 64, 66, 68, 68, 72, 72, 75, 76, 81, 84, 88, 106

Next, it must be determined what the stems will represent and what the leaves will represent. Typically, the leaf contains the last digit of the number and the stem contains all of the other digits. In the case of very large numbers, the data values may be rounded to a particular place value (such as the hundreds place) that will be used for the leaves. The remaining digits to the left of the rounded place value are used as the stem.

In this example, the leaf represents the ones place and the stem will represent the rest of the number (tens place and higher).

The stem-and-leaf display is drawn with two columns separated by a vertical line. The stems are listed to the left of the vertical line. It is important that each stem is listed only once and that no numbers are skipped, even if it means that some stems have no leaves. The leaves are listed in increasing order in a row to the right of each stem.

When there is a repeated number in the data (such as two 72s), the plot must reflect such (so the plot would look like 7 | 2 2 5 6 7 when it has the numbers 72 72 75 76 77).

$$\begin{array}{r|l}
\text{Stem} & \text{Leaf} \\
\hline
4 & 4~6~7~9 \\
5 & \\
6 & 3~4~6~8~8 \\
7 & 2~2~5~6 \\
8 & 1~4~8 \\
9 & \\
10 & 6
\end{array}$$
Key: $6 \mid 3 = 63$
Leaf unit: 1.0
Stem unit: 10.0

A stem-and-leaf plot can be transposed to display the leaves in vertical columns, for example:

$$\begin{array}{l|ccccccc}
& & & 8 & & & & \\
& 9 & & 8 & 6 & & & \\
& 7 & & 6 & 5 & 8 & & \\
& 6 & & 4 & 2 & 4 & & \\
\text{Leaf} & 4 & & 3 & 2 & 1 & & 6 \\\hline
\text{Stem} & 4 & 5 & 6 & 7 & 8 & 9 & 10 \\
\end{array}$$

Rounding may be needed to create a stem-and-leaf display. Based on the following set of data, the stem plot below would be created:

−23.678758, −12.45, −3.4, 4.43, 5.5, 5.678, 16.87, 24.7, 56.8

For negative numbers, a negative is placed in front of the stem unit, which is still the value X / 10. Non-integers are rounded. This allows the stem and leaf plot to retain its shape, even for more complicated data sets. As in this example below:

$$\begin{array}{r|l}
\text{Stem} & \text{Leaf} \\
\hline
-2 & 4 \\
-1 & 2 \\
-0 & 3 \\
0 & 4~6~6  \\
1 & 7 \\
2 & 5 \\
3 & \\
4 & \\
5 & 7
\end{array}$$
Key: $-2 \mid 4 = -24$

== Usage ==
Stem-and-leaf displays are useful for displaying the relative density and shape of the data, giving the reader a quick overview of the distribution. They retain (most of) the raw numerical data, often with perfect integrity. They are also useful for highlighting outliers and finding the mode. However, stem-and-leaf displays are only useful for moderately sized data sets (around 15–150 data points). With very small data sets a stem-and-leaf displays can be of little use, as a reasonable number of data points are required to establish definitive distribution properties. A dot plot may be better suited for such data. With very large data sets, a stem-and-leaf display will become very cluttered, since each data point must be represented numerically. A box plot or histogram may become more appropriate as the data size increases.

== Non-numerical use ==
a│abdeghilmnrstwxy
b│aeioy
c│h
d│aeio
e│adefhlmnrstwx
f│aey
g│iou
h│aeimo
i│dfnost
j│ao
k│aioy
l│aio
m│aeimouy
n│aeouy
o│bdefhikmnoprsuwxy
p│aeio
q│i
r│e
s│hiot
t│aeio
u│ghmnprst
v│
w│eo
x│iu
y│aeou
z│aeo

Stem-and-leaf displays can also be used to convey non-numerical information. In this example of valid two-letter words in Collins Scrabble Words (the word list used in Scrabble tournaments outside the US) with their initials as stems, it can be easily seen that the three most common initials are o, a and e.

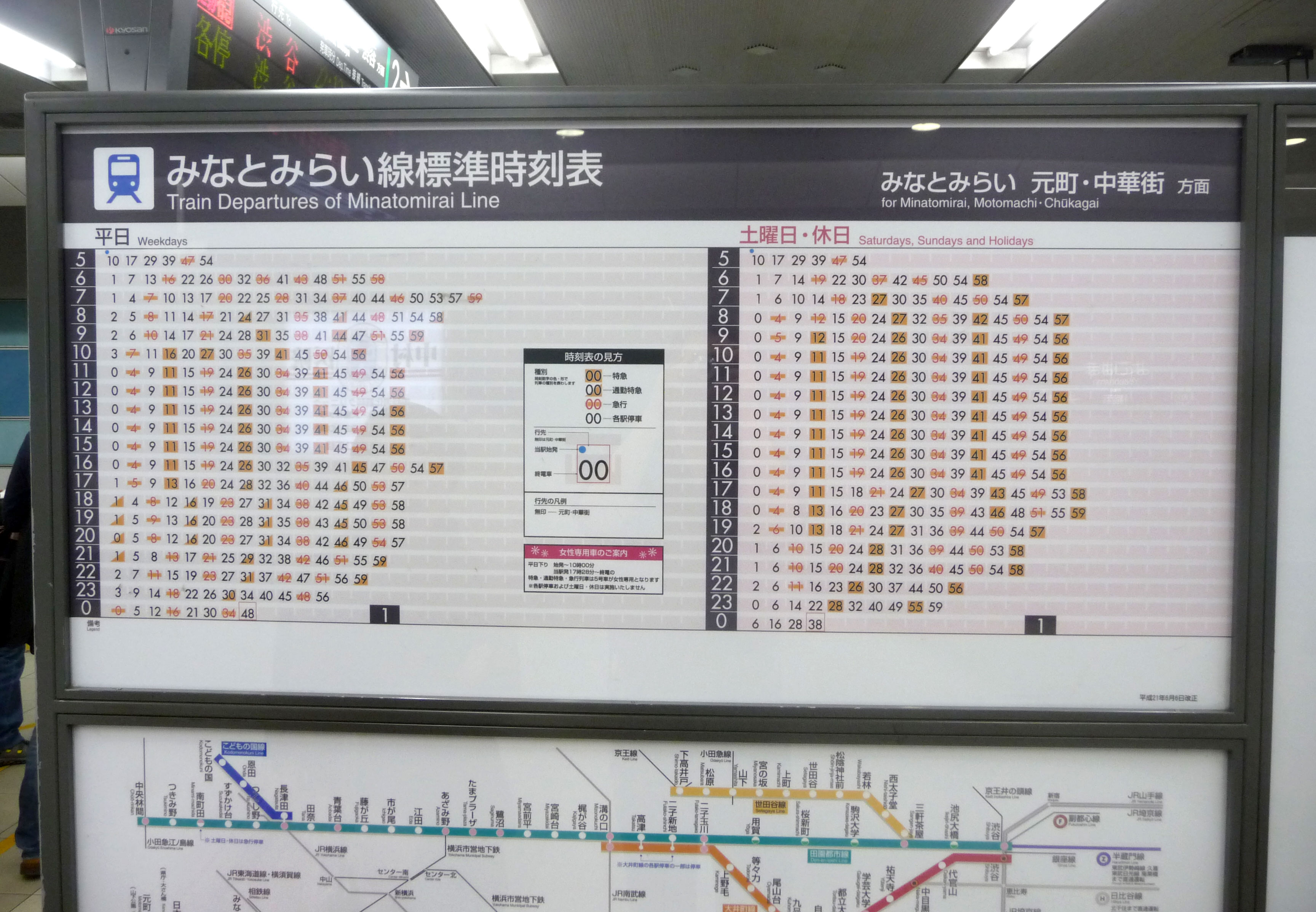

Some railway timetables use stem-and-leaf displays with hours as stems and minutes as leaves
