= A Matter of Chance (TV series) =

Australian documentary series (1981)

A Matter of Chance was an Australian documentary series created by Anne Deveson and broadcast by the ABC in 1981. It was a six part series about the plight of the disabled.

Garrie Hutchinson of the Age praise the series writing "The special quality of this programme is that Anne Deveson allows people to speak for themselves, and without hysteria, tell chilling stories in half an hour. It is a model of what television documentaries can be like." Brian Courtis, also of the Age, called it an excellent series noting Deveson's confidence in going where other reporters will not.

The series won the Logie for Best documentary series at the Logie Awards of 1982.
