= Factor shares =

In macroeconomics, factor shares are the share of production given to the factors of production, usually capital and labor. This concept uses the methods and fits into the framework of neoclassical economics.

== Derivation ==
In exogenous growth models, the production function can be represented by:

$Y=F(K,L)\,$

with Y total production, K capital, and L labor. So a representative agent will attempt to maximize a profit function:

$\pi = max_{\{K,L\}} F(K,L)*P - (rK + wL)\,$

where $rK+wL\,$ is the cost to the firm, r the rental rate of capital, w the wage rate for labor, and P is the price of the output.

As in microeconomics supply and demand models, first-order conditions that the derivative of this function with respect to capital and labor will be zero at the functions maximum. Thus (assuming P = 1) we can calculate the wages and the rental rate of capital:

$w=D_L[F(K,L)]\,$ and $r=D_K[F(K,L)]\,$.

Now we can write the expenditure allocated to labor as $wL=D_L[F(K,L)]*L\,$

and to capital as $rK=D_K[F(K,L)]*K\,$

So the factor share devoted to labor is:

$wL/Y=D_L[F(K,L)]*L/F(K,L)\,$

and the factor share devoted to capital is:

$rK/Y=D_K[F(K,L)]*K/F(K,L)\,$
