= Robert Theobald =

American economist and author

- Born: June 11, 1929; Madras, British India
- Died: November 27, 1999 (aged 70); Spokane, Washington, US
- Occupations: Economist and Futurist
- Partner: Anne Deveson

Robert Theobald (June 11, 1929 – November 27, 1999) was an American private consulting economist and futurist author. In economics, he was best known for his writings on the economics of abundance and his advocacy of a Basic Income Guarantee. Theobald was a member of the Ad Hoc Committee on the Triple Revolution in 1964, and later listed in the top 10 most influential living futurists in The Encyclopedia of the Future.

== Life and work ==
Robert Theobald was born in colonial India in 1929, the son of a British businessman. He moved to England at age 16 (1945), and received his higher education in economics at Cambridge, then lived for three years in Paris. Eventually he continued his studies at Harvard University, in the late 1950s.

As an economist and futurist, Theobald had a global or planetary perspective. He wrote books, prepared and appeared on broadcasts, and lectured around the world to governments, businesses, and organizations.

Theobald questioned and criticized conventional confidence in economic growth, in technology, and in the culture of materialism - all of which he considered to be damaging to the environment while failing to provide opportunity and income for many of the world's people. He warned against trying to maintain, and to spread or mimic worldwide, the American standard of living of the late 20th century.

Despite his criticism of some aspects and effects of technology, Theobald saw tremendous potential in communications technology like on-line, personal computers (which in the 1980s he termed "micro-computers"), seeing these as tools for pooling the thoughts and opinions of very large numbers of individuals spread widely, geographically.

Theobald was an expositor and popularizer of such now-accepted concepts as "networking," "win/win," "systemic thinking," and "communications era."

In 1996, Theobald was selected to give the prestigious 5-part Massey Lecture. Because of a disagreement with the CBC radio programme editorially supporting the lecture, Theobald chose to decline the invitation and publish his essay separately in 1997.

Theobald moved to Spokane shortly after being diagnosed with esophageal cancer in the early fall of 1997. Long-time friends Bob Stilger and Susan Virnig invited him to join their community and their family for the last years of his life. Against the advice of his soon-to-be surgeon, Ryan Holbrook, Robert made a scheduled trip to Australia where his message about the world, society and economics was passionately received. It was the first of six trips to Australia in the last two years of his life, where he found love with journalist Anne Deveson and his strong voice again.

Theobald died of esophageal cancer at his home in Spokane, Washington, shortly after returning from Australia. In the days before his death, his friend and partner of 30 years, Bob Stilger, realized it was time to step away from the organization he had co-founded in 1974, Northwest Regional Facilitators, to create a new organization to carry on the kinds of work he and Robert had been doing. In the waning years of his life, Robert was the co-founder of NewStories.

== Bibliography ==
- The Rich and the Poor; a study of the economics of rising expectations (1959)
- The Challenge of Abundance (1961)
- Free Men and Free Markets (1963)
- The Triple Revolution (with others) (1964)
- The Guaranteed Income (edited) (1966)
- An Alternative Future for America (1968)
- Alternative Future for America II: Essays and Speeches (1970)
- Teg's 1994 (1970)
- Economizing Abundance (1970)
- Futures Conditional (edited) (1972)
- Habit and Habitat (1972)
- The Failure of Success (with Stephanie Mills) (edited) (1973)
- Beyond Despair (1976)
- At the Crossroads (with others) (1984) Produced to mark the 20th anniversary of The Triple Revolution
- An Alternative Future for America's Third Century (1976)
- Avoiding 1984: Moving Toward Interdependence (1982)
- The Rapids of Change: Social Entrepreneurship in Turbulent Times (1987)
- Reworking Success: New Communities at the Millennium (1997) ISBN 0-86571-367-7

== Literature ==
- Deveson, Anne (2003). Resilience. Allen & Unwin. ISBN 1-86448-634-1.
- Whiting, John (1971). The Economics of Human Energy in Brooks Adams, Ezra Pound and Robert Theobald. M.A. in Area Studies ( United States). University of London.
