= Marian Bowley =

British economist

Marian Bowley (1911–2002) was an economist and historian of economic thought. She was the daughter of the economist and statistician Arthur Bowley.

After her BSc and PhD (1936) at the London School of Economics she was first appointed to a lectureship at the Dundee School of Economics in 1938. After government service during World War II she was appointed to a lectureship at University College, London in 1947, and became successively Reader and Professor of Economics. She retired in 1975.

Her main contributions were in the field of the history of economic thought. Her 1937 study on Nassau Senior, Nassau Senior and Classical Economics is to date the most important source on this relatively forgotten and often misunderstood member of the Classical school. She suggests that there were actually two different strands of value theory in Classical economics: one based on the labour theory of value as propagated by the Ricardians, and a subjective approach espoused by Lauderdale, Senior and others. In the collection of studies that was published in 1973, she appears to have moved to the position that both sides had actually more common features than she had previously thought.

Apart from her work in the history of economics, Marian Bowley also made important contributions to the understanding of the building industries.

== Major works ==
- Nassau Senior and Classical Economics, 1937
- Innovations in Building Materials, 1960
- The British Building Industry, 1966
- Studies in the History of Economic Theory before 1870, 1973
