= Frances Wood (statistician) =

English chemist and statistician

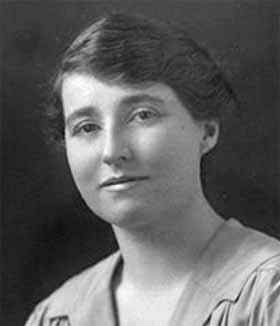
- Image of Frances Wood
- Born: Frances Chick; 25 December 1883; London, England
- Died: 12 October 1919 (aged 35)
- Occupation: Statistician
- Known for: Royal Statistical Society Frances Wood medal

Frances Wood OBE FSS (née Chick; 25 December 1883 – 12 October 1919) was an English chemist and statistician after whom the Wood medal of the Royal Statistical Society is named.

== Life ==
Wood grew up in a large family, the daughter of lace dealer Samuel Chick and the sister of nutritionist Harriette Chick. She studied at Notting Hill High School from 1897 to 1903; she then read chemistry at University College London from 1904 to 1908, earning second class honours there.

From 1908 to 1912, she worked at the Lister Institute of Preventive Medicine as a research chemist, but during this period shifted her interests to medical statistics. She became Grocers’ Research Scholar at Lister in 1912, was seconded to the Board of Trade for the war in 1914, and later moved to the Ministry of Munitions. She remained there until March 1919, when she resigned because of her pregnancy.

She married Sydney Wood, an inspector of the Board of Education, in July 1911. Her daughter Barbara was born in September 1919 by Caesarian section, but Frances died two weeks later of sepsis.

== Contributions ==
Wood's early works in chemistry involved polymerisation and fermentation, under Sir William Ramsay and then Arthur Harden. As a medical statistician, she compared food prices with wages and rent,^{[W1]}^{[W2]} the generalisation of statistical correlations on death rates,^{[BGW]} and mortality rates for cancer and diabetes.^{[GW1]}^{[GW2]}

Her work during the war remains unpublished, but two posthumous papers concern the effects of higher education on fertility,^{[BGW2]} and the correlation between economic class and child mental development.

Her sole-author paper on trends in wages in London 1900–1912 was read before a meeting of the Royal Statistical Society on 18 November 1913, which RSS president F. Y. Edgeworth commented made "an important contribution to the art of measuring changes in the value of money".^{[W1]} She published one further article in the RSS journals, on the changes in the price of food experienced by the working and upper classes, in 1915, with no author affiliation.^{[W2]}

== Awards and honours ==
Wood became a fellow of the Royal Statistical Society in 1913. She became a member of the Order of the British Empire in 1917, and an officer in the order in 1918. Shortly after her death, the society raised funds for a biennial essay contest in her memory. The first recipient of the Frances Wood Memorial Prize was Winifred Mackenzie for her article, "Changes in the Standard of Living in the United Kingdom, 1860-1914." In 2017, the society instituted their Wood medal "for excellent contributions to economic or social statistics".

== Selected publications ==
W1.	Wood, Frances (December 1913), "The Course of Real Wages in London, 1900–12", Journal of the Royal Statistical Society, 77 (1): 1–68, doi:10.2307/2339758, JSTOR 2339758

BGW1.	Brown, J. W.; Greenwood, Major; Wood, Frances (February 1914), "A Study of Index Correlations", Journal of the Royal Statistical Society, 77 (3): 317–346, doi:10.2307/2339727, JSTOR 2339727

GW1.	Greenwood, Major; Wood, Frances (1914), "On Changes in the Recorded Mortality from Cancer and their Possible Interpretation", Proceedings of the Royal Society of Medicine, 7(Sect Epidemiol State Med) (Sect Epidemiol State Med): 119–170, doi:10.1177/003591571400701506, PMC 2002953, PMID 19978156

GW2.	Greenwood, Major; Wood, Frances (April 1914), "The Relation between the Cancer and Diabetes Death-rates", Journal of Hygiene, 14 (1): 83–118, doi:10.1017/S0022172400005702, PMC 2206759, PMID 20474569

W2.	Wood, Frances (July 1916), "The Increase in the Cost of Food for Different Classes of Society since the Outbreak of War", Journal of the Royal Statistical Society, 79 (4): 501–508, doi:10.2307/2341003, JSTOR 2341003

BGW2.	Brown, J. W.; Greenwood, Major; Wood, Frances (October 1920), "The fertility of the english middle classes. A statistical study.", The Eugenics Review, 12 (3): 158–211, PMC 2942447, PMID 21259713
