= Dot plot (statistics) =

Type of bar chart using dots

A dot chart or dot plot is a statistical chart consisting of data points plotted on a fairly simple scale, typically using filled in circles. There are two common, yet very different, versions of the dot chart. The first has been used in hand-drawn (pre-computer era) graphs to depict distributions going back to 1884. The other version is described by William S. Cleveland as an alternative to the bar chart, in which dots are used to depict the quantitative values (e.g. counts) associated with categorical variables.

== Of a distribution ==
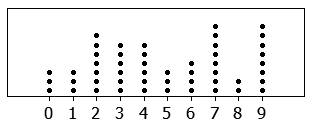
A dot plot of 50 random values from 0 to 9.

The dot plot as a representation of a distribution consists of group of data points plotted on a simple scale. Dot plots are used for continuous, quantitative, univariate data. Data points may be labelled if there are few of them.

Dot plots are one of the simplest statistical plots, and are suitable for small to moderate sized data sets. They are useful for highlighting clusters and gaps, as well as outliers. Their other advantage is the conservation of numerical information. When dealing with larger data sets (around 20–30 or more data points) the related stemplot, box plot or histogram may be more efficient, as dot plots may become too cluttered after this point. Dot plots may be distinguished from histograms in that dots are not spaced uniformly along the horizontal axis.

Although the plot appears to be simple, its computation and the statistical theory underlying it are not simple. The algorithm for computing a dot plot is closely related to kernel density estimation. The size chosen for the dots affects the appearance of the plot. Choice of dot size is equivalent to choosing the bandwidth for a kernel density estimate.

In the R programming language this type of plot is also referred to as a stripchart or stripplot.

== Cleveland dot plots ==
Example of a Cleveland dot plot, showing the death rates per 1000 in Virginia in 1940

Dot plot may also refer to plots of points that each belong to one of several categories. They are an alternative to bar charts or pie charts, and look somewhat like a horizontal bar chart where the bars are replaced by dots at the values associated with each category. Compared to (vertical) bar charts and pie charts, Cleveland argues that dot plots allow more accurate interpretation of the graph by readers by making the labels easier to read, reducing non-data ink (or graph clutter) and supporting table look-up.

== Dot chart in process mapping ==
The term dot chart is also used in the area of process mapping. This is a simplified flowchart process flow chart in which columns are tasks, rows are roles, and dots that are inserted at the intersection of tasks and roles represent a sequence of steps. In other words, it is an extensive RACI table with additional information about the sequence of steps in the process.

== See also ==
- Data and information visualization
- Scatter plot

== Other references ==
- Wild, C. and Seber, G. (2000) Chance Encounters: A First Course in Data Analysis and Inference John Wiley and Sons. ISBN 0-471-32936-3
