= Robert Pickus =

Robert Pickus (October 31, 1923 – January 22, 2016) was a prominent figure in Quaker, pacifist, and peace movements. Born in Sioux City, Iowa, he attended the University of Chicago, where he was a research assistant to Mortimer Adler for the Great Books of the Western World program. In 1942, he enlisted in the army, and worked with the Office of Strategic Services (OSS) in England and Sweden.

He was co-author of Speak Truth to Power (American Friends Service Committee, 1955); founder of Turn Toward Peace (1961), and World Without War Council (1969); and co-author with Robert Woito of To End War: an Introduction to the Ideas, Books, Organizations, and Work That Can Help (1970). In the mid-1960s Pickus caused controversy by attacking "radical pacifists and leftists" in the anti-Vietnam war movement, whom he accused of being "naively one-sided in their criticism of American foreign policy".

In a 2001 interview, Pickus argued that in "the current political climate, war is essential for justice to prevail". He said that the World Without War Council supported actions such as the bombing of Taliban radio systems, provided civilians were given advance warning. Pickus also stated he regarded the United States as a benevolent force in world affairs.

Pickus died on January 22, 2016, in St. Helena, California.
