= One Door Mental Health =

Australian not for profit organisation

One Door Mental Health, formerly Schizophrenia Fellowship of New South Wales Inc (SFNSW), is a community-based not for profit organisation that provides a range of services for people with mental illness, their families, and carers. One Door Mental Health operates predominantly in the Australian state of New South Wales.

== History ==
SFNSW began in 1985 with a public meeting that was attended by over 300 people. It was incorporated in 1986.

In February 2017, the Schizophrenia Fellowship of New South Wales renamed to One Door Mental Health.

== Services ==
One Door Mental Health provides programs predominantly across NSW including:

- Carer services including carer advocates, carer education sessions, carer respite, support groups, young carer programs, NDIS for carers.
- Centre-based services including Berrima Cottage Bowral, Endeavour Clubhouse Port Macquarie, Frangipani House Parramatta, Harmony House Campbelltown, Helping Hands Nowra, Hercules House Chatswood, Light & Hope House Wollongong, Pioneer Clubhouse Balgowlah, Sunflower House Ulladulla & Wagga Wagga.
- Education and Training http://www.onedoor.org.au/events/workshops
- Employment
- Healthcare including NDIS
- Individual Support including information & support helpline, Hospital to Home, Western Sydney Recovery College, and Partners in Recovery.
- Support Groups http://www.onedoor.org.au/services/support-groups/support-groups-list
- Youth Support including the On Fire program and managing headspace sites around NSW.

== Awards ==
1995 Mental Health Matters Award, Mental Health Association NSW, awarded to Schizophrenia Fellowship of NSW for positive awareness of mental health and sunflower logo
1998 Transcultural Mental Health Centre Award for Excellence awarded to NOUS
1999 Community Service Award, Western Sydney Area Health Service awarded to NOUS
2003 Certificate of Commendation, Mental Health Association NSW awarded to NOUS
2003 Lilly Partnerships in Wellbeing Gold Award awarded to On Fire!
2004 Mental Health Matters Award for Non-Government or Community Organisation, Mental Health Association NSW awarded to Carers Support Unit (now Carer Assist)
2005 Premio Internacional El Ojo de Iberoamerica Award awarded to Avant Card campaign
2006 TheMHS Gold Award for Carer Services awarded to Carer Assist
2007 International Free Card Award, Social and Environment Category awarded to Avant Card campaign
