= Gaza District =

District of Mandatory Palestine

Coordinates: 31.5167°N 34.4500°E

Districts of Palestine in 1945, Gaza District in red.

Gaza District was one of the districts of Mandatory Palestine.

In 1939 it consisted of two subdistricts:

- Beersheba Subdistrict
- Gaza Subdistrict
