= Frances W. Herring =

Frances W. Herring (May 31, 1902 – August 11, 1993) was a Professor of Government at University of California, Berkeley. She was the leader of the Women Strike for Peace in 1961 and a signatory on The Triple Revolution.

== Career ==
Herring was a Professor of Government at the University of California, Berkeley. She wrote about housing, employment and development in America. In 1948 she formed the Washington Committee for Academic Freedom records. Herring wrote about the development and control of nuclear industry in California.

Herring was a member of the Women's International League for Peace and Freedom. She was a member of the San Francisco branch. Herring was the leader of the Women Strike for Peace in 1961. She initiated the Women Strike for Peace bulletin, which transformed the strike into a national movement. She attended the Oslo Conference Against Nuclear Weapons. In 1962 Herring attended the World Without the Bomb Conference in Accra. In 1965 Herring was one of a ten-person delegation to visit Jakarta. She delivered testimony to the Parliament of the United Kingdom urging them to end the Vietnam War.

Herring was part of the movement to secure Americans a guaranteed income, and was one of the signatories of The Triple Revolution. She was one of the National Commission on Technology, Automation and Economic Progress.

She died on August 11, 1993.

=== Books ===
- 1965 Open Space and the Law
