= Stylized fact =

Simplified presentation of empirical finding

In social sciences, especially economics, a stylized fact is a simplified presentation of an empirical finding. Stylized facts are broad tendencies that aim to summarize the data, offering essential truths while ignoring individual details. Stylized facts offer strong generalizations that are generally true for entire populations, even when the generalization may not be true for individual observations.

A prominent example of a stylized fact is: "Education significantly raises lifetime income." Another stylized fact in economics is: "In advanced economies, real GDP growth fluctuates in a recurrent but irregular fashion".

However, scrutiny to detail will often produce counterexamples. In the case given above, holding a PhD may lower lifetime income, because of the years of lost earnings it implies and because many PhD holders enter academia instead of higher-paid fields. Nonetheless, broadly speaking, people with more education tend to earn more, so the above example is true in the sense of a stylized fact.

== Origin of the term ==
=== Jan Tinbergen ===
When describing what is generally regarded as the first econometric macro model ever developed, Jan Tinbergen (1936) introduced the concept of stylization as follows:

To get a clear view, stylisation is indispensable. The many phenomena must be grouped in such a way that the picture becomes clear, yet without losing its characteristic traits. Of course every stylisation is a hazardous venture. The art of the social economist's work lies in this stylisation. Some stylisations have been unwieldy, others have been unrealistic. But stylisation is essential. The alternative is barrenness.

=== Nicholas Kaldor ===
The term "stylised facts" was introduced by the economist Nicholas Kaldor in the context of a debate on economic growth theory in 1961, expanding on model assumptions made in a 1957 paper. Criticizing the neoclassical models of economic growth of his time, Kaldor argued that theory construction should begin with a summary of the relevant facts. However, to handle the problem that "facts as recorded by statisticians, are always subject to numerous snags and qualifications, and for that reason are incapable of being summarized", he suggested that theorists "should be free to start off with a stylised view of the facts – i.e. concentrate on broad tendencies, ignoring individual detail". With respect to broad tendencies that result from such a process, Kaldor coined the term "stylized facts".

== Examples ==
Stylized facts are widely used in economics, in particular to motivate the construction of a model and/or to validate it. Examples are:

- Stock returns are uncorrelated and not easily forecastable.
- Yield curves tend to move in parallel.
- Education is positively correlated to lifetime earnings
- Inventory behavior of firms: "the variance of production exceeds the variance of sales"

== Uses ==
Already in the original paper, Kaldor used his stylized facts of economic growth to argue in favor of his suggested model in comparison to older neoclassical models of economic growth. This idea has been highlighted subsequently by Boland, that the advantages of one model over the other can be set in a clear perspective via the reference of the stylized facts the respective models can explain. Additionally, stylized facts can be used to look "under the hood of models", i.e. be used to validate assumptions of model in a focused way. This can be of particular importance in more complex models. Econophysics/Statistical finance begins from stylized facts. Furthermore, the considerable potential of Stylized Facts for Information Systems research has been investigated and discussed in recent years.

== Reception by other economists ==
In an early response, Robert Solow pinpointed a possible problem of stylized facts, stating "there is no doubt that they are stylized, though it is possible to question whether they are facts". The criticized practice of deriving stylized facts ad hoc is still quite prevalent in economics. Still, some possible approaches to derive stylized facts from empirical evidence have been suggested, such as surveying experts, statistically analysing large data sets (especially suitable for financial markets) or aggregating both qualitative and quantitative data from different empirical methods by following a systematic process.

== See also ==
- Alternative fact
- Idealised population
- Mathiness
