= History of industrial ecology =

Field of research focused on industrial ecosystems

The establishment of industrial ecology as field of scientific research is commonly attributed to an article devoted to industrial ecosystems, written by Frosch and Gallopoulos, which appeared in a 1989 special issue of Scientific American. Industrial ecology emerged from several earlier ideas and concepts, some of which date back to the 19th century.

== Before the 1960s ==
The term "industrial ecology" has been used alongside "industrial symbiosis" at least since the 1940s. Economic geography was perhaps one of the first fields to use these terms. For example, in an article published in 1947, George T. Renner refers to "The General Principle of Industrial Location" as a "Law of Industrial Ecology". Briefly stated this is:

Any industry tends to locate at a point which provides optimum access to its ingredients or component elements. If all these component elements be juxtaposed, the location of the industry is predetermined. If, however, they occur widely separated, the industry is so located as to be most accessible to that element which would be the most expensive or difficult to transport and which, therefore, becomes the locative factor for the industry in question.

In the same article the author defines and describes industrial symbiosis:

Often the location of an industry cannot be fully understood solely in terms of its locative ingredient elements. There are relationships between industries, sometimes simple, but often quite complex, which enter into and complicate the analysis. Chief among these is the phenomenon of industrial symbiosis. By this is meant the consorting together of two or more of dissimilar industries. Industrial Symbiosis, when scrutinized, is seen to be of two kinds, disjunctive and conjunctive.

It appears that the concept of Industrial Symbiosis was not new for the field of economic geography, since the same categorization is used by Walter G. Lezius in his 1937 article "Geography of Glass Manufacture at Toledo, Ohio", also published in the Journal of Economic Geography.

Used in a different context, the term "Industrial Ecology" is also found in a 1958 paper concerned with the relationship between the ecological impact from increasing urbanization and value orientations of related peoples. The case study is in Lebanon:

The central ecological variable in the present research is ecological mobility, or the movement of men in space. It is patent that modern Industrial Ecology requires more such adaptive mobility than does traditional folk-village organization.

== 1960s ==
In 1963, we find the term Industrial Ecology (defined as the "complex ecology of the modern industrial world") being used to describe the social nature and complexity of (and within) industrial systems:

...industrial organisations are social rather than mechanical systems. A firm is not only a working organisation with a working purpose. It is rather a community with its own 'politics', in so far as it is involved in problems concerned with the proper distribution of power between individuals and groups of individuals and with questions of individual and group prestige, influence, status and standing... [and he concludes that] the understanding which the student of management is expected to gain is no less than the attainment of insight into an Industrial Ecology of great complexity.

In 1967, the President of the American association for the advancement of science writes in "The experimental city" that "There are examples of industrial symbiosis where one industry feeds off, or at least neutralizes, the wastes of another..." The same author in 1970 talks about "The Next Industrial Revolution" The concept of material and energy sharing and reuse is central to his proposal for a new industrial revolution and he cites agro-industrial symbiosis as a practical way for achieving this:

The object of the next industrial revolution is to ensure that there will be no such thing as waste, on the basis that waste is simply some substance that we do not vet have the wit to use... The next industrial revolution is this generating of a huge new [industry that]... will not produce products, it will rather reprocess the things we call wastes so they may be reproduced in the factories into the things we need... Having the city near the rural area will enable waste heat to be used to speed up the biological processes of treating the organic wastes before they go back into the land. This might end in an elegant arrangement-the power plants located close enough to the center of use, to the people who need the power, but also, within the economics, close enough to the agriculture lands so that the waste heat may be used there. This is an example of agro-industrial symbiosis, if you like to call it that.

In these early articles, "Industrial Ecology" is used in its literal sense - as a system of interacting industrial entities. The relation to natural ecosystems (through either metaphor or analogy) is not explicit. Industrial Symbiosis on the other hand, is already clearly defined as a type of industrial organization, and the term symbiosis is borrowed from the ecological sciences to describe an analogous phenomenon in industrial systems.

== 1970s ==
Industrial Ecology has been a research subject of the Japan Industrial Policy Research Institute since 1971. Their definition of Industrial Ecology is "research for the prospect of dynamic harmonization between human activities and nature by a systems approach based upon ecology (JIPRI, 1983)". This programme has resulted to a number of reports that are available only in Japanese.

One of the earliest definitions of Industrial Ecology was proposed by Harry Zvi Evan at a seminar of the Economic Commission of Europe in Warsaw (Poland) in 1973 (an article was subsequently published by Evan in the Journal for International Labour Review in 1974 vol. 110 (3), pp. 219–233). Evan defined Industrial Ecology as a systematic analysis of industrial operations including factors like: Technology, environment, natural resources, bio-medical aspects, institutional and legal matters as well as the socio-economic aspects.

In 1974 the term of Industrial Ecology is perhaps for the first time associated with a cyclical production mode (rather than a linear one, resulting to waste). In this article, the necessity for a transition to an "open-world Industrial Ecology", is used as argument for the need to establish lunar industries:

Low living standards provide one strong motive for most developing countries to increase their productivity and grow economically. Population increase (while it lasts) is a still more powerful driver for increased world consumption. Thus the pressure on resources will continue to grow. Instead of deploring it, we better grow with it. Only through transition to an open-world Industrial Ecology - which includes both benign industrial revolution on Earth and extraterrestrial industrialization - can the present apparent limits to growth be overcome.

Many elements of modern Industrial Ecology were commonplace in the industrial sectors of the former Soviet Union. For example, “kombinirovanaia produksia” (combined production) was present from the earliest years of the Soviet Union and was instrumental in shaping the patterns of Soviet industrialization. “Bezotkhodnoyi tekhnologii” (waste-free technology) was introduced in the final decades of the USSR as a way to increase industrial production while limiting environmental impact. Fiodor Davitaya, a Soviet scientist from the Republic of Georgia, described in 1977 the analogy relating industrial systems to natural systems as a model for a desirable transition to cleaner production:

Nature operates without any waste products. What is rejected by some organisms provides food for others. The organisation of industry on this principle—with the waste products of some branches of industry providing raw material for others—means in effect using natural processes as a model, for in them the resolution of all arising contradictions is the motive force of progress.

== 1980s ==
By the 80s Industrial Ecology was already "promoted" to a research subject, which several institutes around the globe embraced. In a 1986 article published in Ecological Modelling, there is a full description of Industrial Ecology and the analogy to natural ecosystems is clearly stated:

The structure and inner-working of an industrial society resemble those of a natural ecosystem. The concepts in ecology such as habitat, succession, trophic level, limiting factors and community metabolism can also apply to the study of the ecology of an industrial society. For instance, an industry in a society may grow or decline as a consequence of dynamic changes in exogenous limiting resources and in the hierarchical and/or metabolic structure of that society. When studying the ecology of an industrial society (henceforth termed 'Industrial Ecology'), these concepts and methodologies employed in ecosystems analyses are useful.

In fact, in the above article there is an attempt to model an "industrial ecological system". The model is composed of seven major sections: industry, population, labor force, living state, environment and pollution, general health, and occupational health. Notice the rough similarity with Evan's factors as stated in the above section.

During the 80s the emergence of another related term, "industrial metabolism", is observed. The term is used as a metaphor for the organization and functioning of industrial activity. In an article defending the "biological modulation of terrestrial carbon cycle", the author includes an extraordinary parenthetical note:

it is an intrinsic property of life to proliferate exponentially until the encounter of limits set by (I) the availability of biologically utilizable reducing power, or (2) the exhaustion of some critical nutrient, or (3) an autotoxic effect imposed by life on its own environment. These limits are universal, applying to microbial ecosystems as well as to the population dynamics of a seemingly unrestricted biological superdominant such as Homo Sapiens (here, the ultimate limit is likely to be placed by an autotoxic effect exerted by the "extrasomatic" (industrial) metabolism of the human race).

=== 1989 – Decisive articles ===
In 1989 two articles were released that played a decisive role in the history of industrial ecology. The first one was titled "Industrial Metabolism" by Robert Ayres. Ayres essentially lays the foundations of Industrial Ecology, although the term is not to be found in this article. In the appendix of the article he includes "a theoretical exploration of the biosphere and the industrial economy as material-transformation systems and lessons that might be learned from their comparison". He proposes that:

We may think of both the biosphere and the industrial economy as systems for the transformation of materials. The biosphere as it now exists is nearly a perfect system for recycling materials. This was not the case when life on earth began. The industrial system of today resembles the earliest stage of biological evolution, when the most primitive living organisms obtained their energy from a stock of organic molecules accumulated during prebiotic times. It is increasingly urgent for us to learn from the biosphere and modify our industrial metabolism, the energy - and value - yielding process essential to economic development... we should not only postulate, but indeed endorse, a long-run imperative favoring an industrial metabolism that results in reduced extraction of virgin materials, reduced loss of waste materials, and increased recycling of useful ones.

The term "Industrial Ecology" gains mainstream attention later the same year (1989) through a "Scientific American" article named "Strategies for Manufacturing". In this article, R.Frosch and N.Gallopoulos wonder "why would not our industrial system behave like an ecosystem, where the wastes of a species may be resource to another species? Why would not the outputs of an industry be the inputs of another, thus reducing use of raw materials, pollution, and saving on waste treatment?"

This vision gave birth to the concept of the Eco-industrial Park, the industrial complex that is governed by Industrial Ecology principles. A notable example resides in a Danish industrial park in the city of Kalundborg. There, several linkages of byproducts and waste heat can be found between numerous entities such as a large power plant, an oil refinery, a pharmaceutical plant, a plasterboard factory, an enzyme manufacturer, a waste company and the city itself.

Frosch's and Gallopoulos' thinking was in certain ways simply an extension of earlier ideas, such as the efficiency and waste-reduction thinking annunciated by Buckminster Fuller and his students (e.g., J. Baldwin), and parallel ideas about energy cogeneration, such as those of Amory Lovins and the Rocky Mountain Institute.

== 1990s ==
In 1991, C. Kumar Patel organized a seminal colloquium on Industrial Ecology, held on May 20 and 21, 1991, at the National Academy of Sciences in Washington D.C. The papers were later published in the Proceedings of the National Academy of Sciences USA, and they form an excellent reference on Industrial Ecology. Papers include:

- Jelinski, L. W.; Graedel, T. E.; Laudise, R. A.; McCall, D. W.; Patel, C. K. (1992). "Industrial ecology: Concepts and approaches". Proceedings of the National Academy of Sciences of the United States of America. 89 (3): 793–7. Bibcode:1992PNAS...89..793J. doi:10.1073/pnas.89.3.793. PMC 48326. PMID 11607253.
- Frosch, R. A. (1992). "Industrial ecology: A philosophical introduction". Proceedings of the National Academy of Sciences of the United States of America. 89 (3): 800–3. Bibcode:1992PNAS...89..800F. doi:10.1073/pnas.89.3.800. PMC 48328. PMID 11607255.
- Nordhaus, W. D. (1992). "The ecology of markets". Proceedings of the National Academy of Sciences of the United States of America. 89 (3): 843–50. Bibcode:1992PNAS...89..843N. doi:10.1073/pnas.89.3.843. PMC 48338. PMID 11607264.
- Ausubel, J. H. (1992). "Industrial ecology: Reflections on a colloquium". Proceedings of the National Academy of Sciences of the United States of America. 89 (3): 879–84. Bibcode:1992PNAS...89..879A. doi:10.1073/pnas.89.3.879. PMC 48348. PMID 11607273.

== 21st century ==
The Journal of Industrial Ecology (since 1997), the International Society for Industrial Ecology (since 2001), and the journal Progress in Industrial Ecology (since 2004) have covered industrial ecology in the international scientific community. Principles of industrial ecology are also emerging in various policy realms such as the concept of the circular economy that is being promoted in China. Although the definition of the circular economy has yet to be formalized, generally the focus is on strategies such as creating a circular flow of materials, and cascading energy flows. An example of this would be using waste heat from one process to run another process that requires a lower temperature. This maximizes the efficiency of exergy use. This strategy aims for a more efficient economy with fewer pollutants and other unwanted by-products.
