= Eco Park =

Eco Park or EcoPark may refer to:

- Aviary and Eco-Park, Rangunia in Chittagong District, Bangladesh
- Eco Park (stadium), a stadium in Gloucestershire, England.
- Eco Park, Kolkata in Rajarhat, Kolkata, India
- Eco Park, Patna in Bihar, India
- Royal National City Park in Sweden
- Tilagor Eco Park in the Sylhet district, Bangladesh
- Birmingham EcoPark, an environmental education centre, Birmingham, England
- EcoPark (Hong Kong), an industrial park for waste recycling and environmental engineering
- Ecopark (Vietnam), an urban township development on the outskirts of Hanoi
- Edmonton EcoPark, a waste-to-energy plant in Edmonton, London
- Kuakata Ecopark, Kalapara Upazila, Patuakhali District, Bangladesh
- La Mesa Ecopark, a public park in Quezon City, Metro Manila, Philippines
- Abetifi Stone Age Park, an eco-park in Eastern Region, Ghana

== See also ==
- Nature reserve
- Nature park
- Protected area
- Eco-industrial park
- Echo Park (disambiguation)
