= Sustainable city =

City designed with consideration for social, economic, and environmental impact

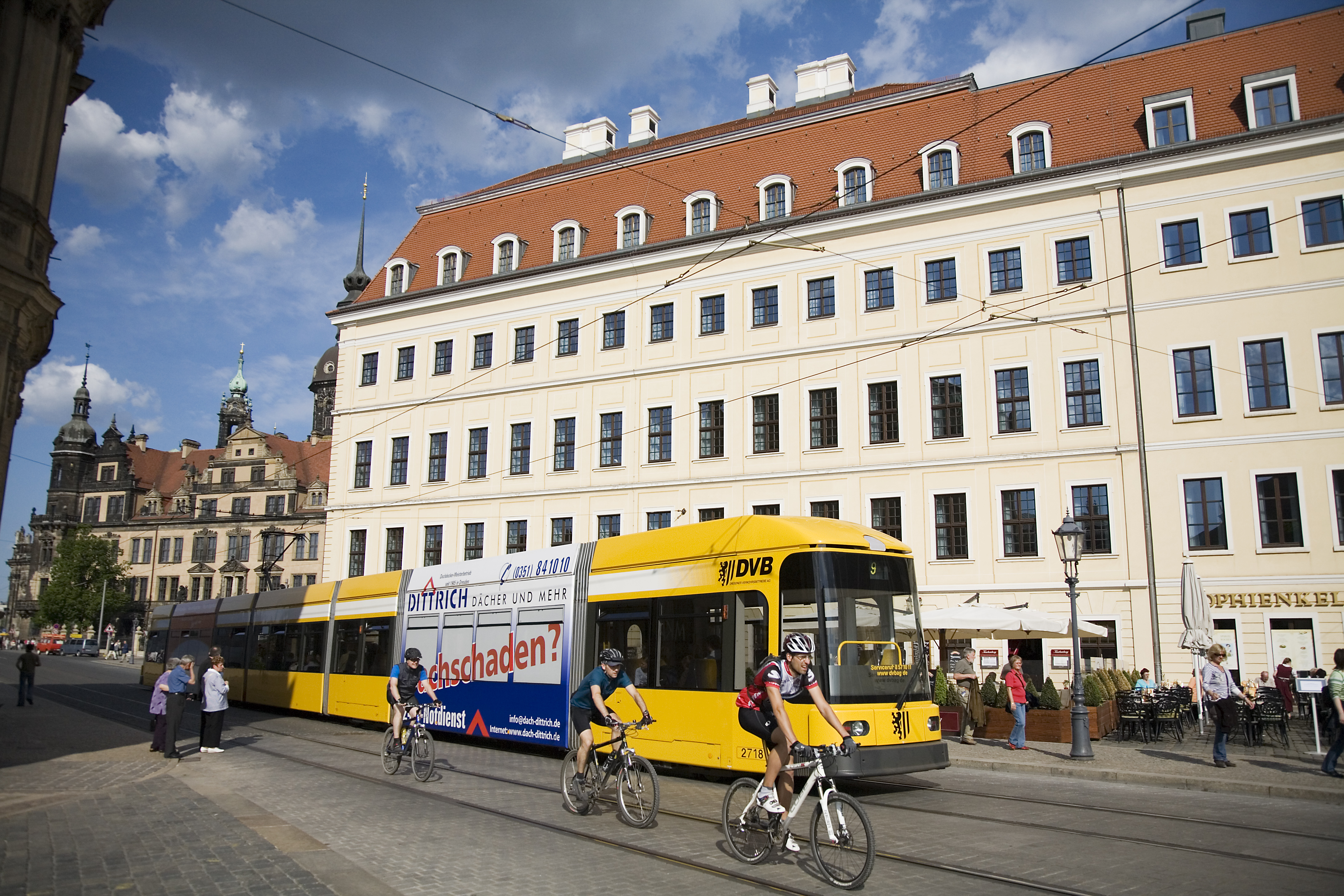
Sustainable transport and cyclability are components of improving the sustainability of a city.

A sustainable city, eco-city, or green city is a city designed with consideration for the social, economic, and environmental impact (commonly referred to as the triple bottom line), as well as a resilient habitat for existing populations. The UN Sustainable Development Goal 11 defines a sustainable city as one that is dedicated to achieving green, social, and economic sustainability, facilitating opportunities that prioritize inclusivity as well as maintaining a sustainable economic growth. Furthermore, the objective is to minimize the inputs of energy, water, and food, and to drastically reduce waste, as well as the outputs of heat, air pollution (including CO2, methane, and water pollution).

The UN Environment Programme calls out that most cities today are struggling with environmental degradation, traffic congestion, inadequate urban infrastructure, in addition to a lack of basic services, such as water supply, sanitation, and waste management. A sustainable city should promote economic growth and meet the basic needs of its inhabitants, while creating sustainable living conditions for all. Ideally, a sustainable city is one that creates an enduring way of life across the four domains of ecology, economics, politics, and culture. The European Investment Bank is assisting cities in the development of long-term strategies in fields including renewable transportation, energy efficiency, sustainable housing, education, and health care. The European Investment Bank has spent more than €150 billion in bettering cities over the last eight years.

Cities occupy just three percent of the Earth's land but account for 60-80% of energy consumption and at least 70% of carbon emissions. Thus, creating safe, resilient, and sustainable cities is one of the top priorities of the Sustainable Development Goals. Priorities of a sustainable city include the ability to feed itself with a sustainable reliance on the surrounding natural environment and the ability to power itself with renewable sources of energy, while creating the smallest conceivable ecological footprint and the lowest quantity of pollution achievable. In other words, sustainable cities should use renewable energy sources to ensure the city is energy efficient and uses clean energy without creating more pollution.

== Practical methods to create sustainable cities ==
- Different agricultural systems such as agricultural plots within the city (suburbs or centre). This reduces the distance food has to travel from field to fork. This may be done by either small-scale/private farming plots or through larger-scale agriculture (e.g. farmscrapers).
- Renewable energy sources, such as wind turbines, solar panels, or bio-gas created from sewage to reduce and manage pollution. Cities provide economies of scale that make such energy sources viable.
- Various methods to reduce the need for air conditioning (a massive energy demand), such as passive daytime radiative cooling applications, planting trees and lightening surface colors, natural ventilation systems, an increase in water features, and green spaces equaling at least 20% of the city's surface. A 2024 meta-analysis of 182 studies across 110 cities found that street and residential trees can reduce near-ground air temperatures by as much as 12 °C, with the strongest cooling effects observed in hot, dry climates and in urban areas characterized by more open morphologies. These measures counter the "heat island effect" caused by an abundance of tarmac and asphalt, which can make urban areas several degrees warmer than surrounding rural areas—as much as six degrees Celsius during the evening.
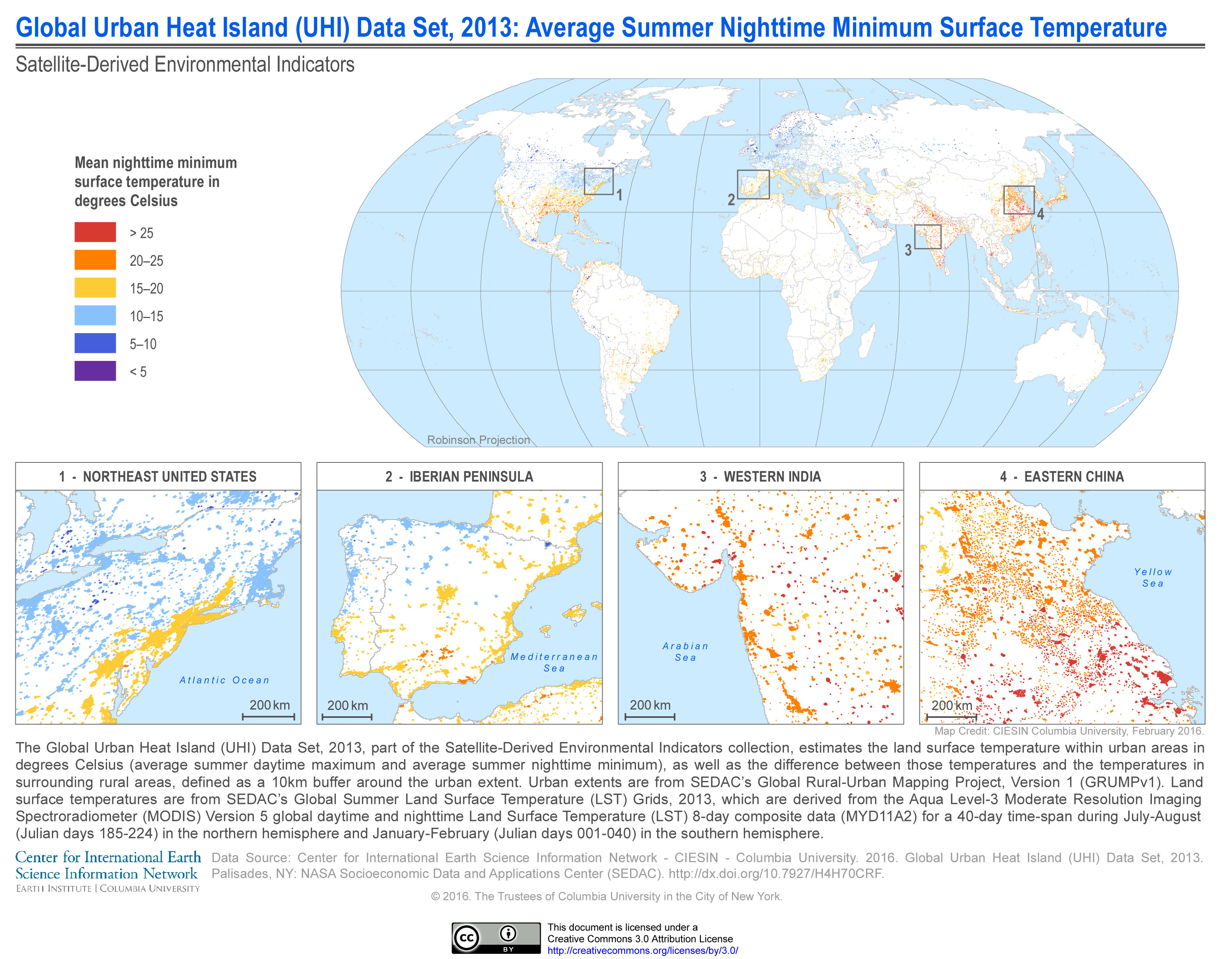
  Showing pockets of urban spaces creating the Heat Island effect with ranging temperatures
- Improved public transport and an increase in pedestrianization to reduce car emissions. This requires a radically different approach to city planning, with integrated business, industrial, and residential zones. Roads may be designed to make driving difficult.
- Optimal building density to make public transport viable but avoid the creation of urban heat islands.
- Green roofs alter the surface energy balance and can help mitigate the urban heat island effect. Incorporating eco roofs or green roofs in your design will help with air quality, climate, and water runoff.
- Zero-emission transport
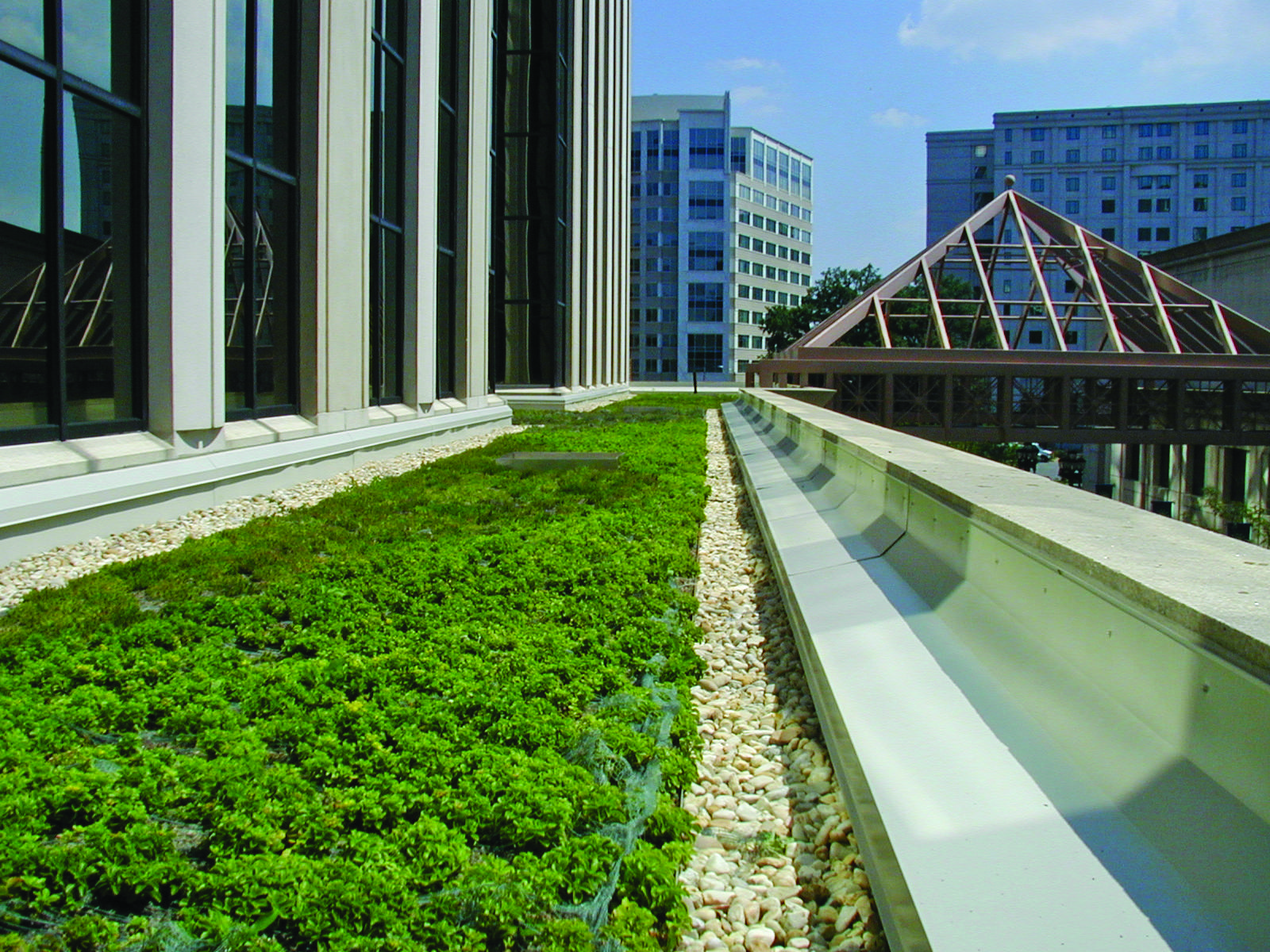
  Plants growing on building
- Zero-energy building to reduce energy consumption and greenhouse gas emissions using renewable energy sources.
- Sustainable urban drainage systems or SUDS in addition to other systems to reduce and manage waste.
- Energy conservation systems/devices
- Xeriscaping – garden and landscape design for water conservation
- Sustainable transport, incorporates five elements: fuel economy, occupancy, electrification, pedal power, and urbanization.
- Circular economy to combat inefficient resource patterns and ensure a sustainable production and consumption roadmap.
- Increase of cycling infrastructure would increase cycling within cities and reduce the number of cars being driven and in turn reduce car emissions. This would also benefit the health of citizens as they would be able to get more exercise through cycling.
- Key performance indicators – development and operational management tool providing guidance and M&V for city administrators currently monitor and evaluate energy savings in various facilities.
- Sustainable Sites Initiative or SSI – voluntary national guidelines and performance benchmarks for sustainable land design, construction and maintenance practices. Key areas of focus are soil, vegetation, hydrology, materials, and human health and well-being.

Sustainable cities are creating safe spaces for its inhabitants through various means, such as:

There are a few ways sustainable cities are creating safe spaces for their inhabitants. One of the first means is decreasing urban sprawl, which is creating more opportunities for people to live within the city instead of creating more living farther from the city. In sustainable cities, this means allowing people to live closer to the workspace, which is typically in the city, downtown, or urban center. City officials are seeking new methods to increase density by changing the antiquated attitudes many suburbanites have towards inner-city areas. One of the new ways to achieve this is by solutions worked out by the Smart Growth Movement.

Another method for cities to create safe spaces for inhabitants is by educating residents of cities about the importance and positive impacts of living in a more sustainable city. This initiative boosts the desire for sustainable developments, and pushes people to live in a more sustainable and environmentally-friendly way.Recent research proposes that cities can be conceptualized as having an "urban genome" — a coded architecture of service protocols, infrastructure, and governance rules. When analyzed through data integration and artificial intelligence, this framework enables predictive, adaptive, and cross-sector planning toward more sustainable, resilient, and inclusive urban systems.

The final method to note is policy and planning changes to meet the unmet demands for urban services. Some of these services include water, energy, transport, depending on the city and its needs.

With regard to methods of emissions, counting cities can be challenging as production of goods and services within their territory can be related either to domestic consumption, or exports. Conversely, the citizens also consume imported goods and services. To avoid double counting in any emissions calculation it should be made clear where the emissions are to be counted: at the site of production or consumption. This may be complicated given long production chains in a globalized economy.

Moreover, the embodied energy and consequences of large-scale raw material extraction required for renewable energy systems and electric vehicle batteries are likely to represent its own complications. For example, local emissions at the site of utilization are likely to be very small but life-cycle emissions can still be significant.

== Architecture ==
External videos
- Iranian city uses ancient techniques to defy summer heat - AFP . Iranian city uses ancient techniques to defy summer heat - AFP

Buildings provide the infrastructure for a functioning city and allow for many opportunities to demonstrate a commitment to sustainability. A commitment to sustainable architecture encompasses all phases of building including the planning, building, and restructuring. Sustainable Site Initiative is used by landscape architects, designers, engineers, architects, developers, policy-makers, and others to align land development and management with innovative sustainable design.

=== Eco-industrial park ===
The United Nations Industrial Development Organization (UNIDO) defines eco-industrial park as a community of businesses located on a common property in which businesses seek to achieve enhanced environmental, economic, and social performance through collaboration in managing environmental and resource issues. This is an industrial symbiosis where companies gain an added benefit by physically exchanging materials, energy, water, and by-products, thus enabling sustainable development. This collaboration reduces environmental impact while simultaneously improves economic performance of the area.

The components for building an eco-industrial park include natural systems, more efficient use of energy, and more efficient material and water flows. Industrial parks should be built to fit into their natural settings in order to reduce environmental impacts, which can be accomplished through plant design, landscaping, and choice of materials. For instance, there is an industrial park in Michigan built by Phoenix Designs that is made almost entirely from recycled materials. The landscaping of the building will include native trees, grasses, and flowers, and the landscaping design will also act as climate shelter for the facility. In choosing the materials for building an eco-industrial park, designers must consider the life-cycle analysis of each medium that goes into the building to assess their true impact on the environment and to ensure that they are using it from one plant to another, steam connections from firms to provide heating for homes in the area, and using renewable energy such as wind and solar power. In terms of material flows, the companies in an eco-industrial park may have common waste treatment facilities, a means for transporting by-products from one plant to another, or anchoring the park around resource recovery companies that are recruited to the location or started from scratch. To create more efficient water flows in industrial parks, the processed water from one plant can be reused by another plant and the park's infrastructure can include a way to collect and reuse stormwater runoff.

== Examples of methods ==
=== Recycled Park in Rotterdam, the Netherlands ===
The Recycled Park in Rotterdam, the second-largest city in the Netherlands, is an initiative introduced by Recycled Island Foundation, a Netherlands-based organization focused on recycling littered waste via creating their iconic island-parks, among other sustainable projects. Rotterdam's Recycled Park is a cluster of floating, green hexagonal "islands" composed of reused litter. The group has utilized a system of passive litter traps to collect this litter from the Maas River. The park's location upon the Maas River reflects a circular process aimed at creating a more sustainable city.

On the underside of the recycled park are materials that will support the growth of plants and wildlife indigenous to the area. This interest in growing the biodiversity of Rotterdam's natural elements is also reflected in other cities. Chicago's Urban Rivers organization is similarly trying to solve this issue by building and growing the Wild Mile of floating parks and forests along the Chicago River with the goal of revegetation. Both Urban Rivers' and Recycled Island Foundation's interest in improving the area's biodiversity reflects an interest in greening the built urbanism of the surrounding city.

Rotterdam's Recycled Park may suggest a greater trend in creating floating structures in response to greater climate-change-motivated impacts. The Floating Farm in Rotterdam sustainably approaches food production and transport. Other floating structures include renewable energy-powered houseboats and luxury residences some 800 meters from the coast. The Dutch city of Amsterdam likewise boasts a neighbourhood of artificial, floating islands in the suburb of IJburg.

The idea of expanding both commercial enterprise and residential developments onto the water is oftentimes reflective of the demand to limit land-usage in urban areas. This has various, wide-reaching environmental impacts: reducing the aggregation of the urban heat-island effect, the zoning efforts expended on engineering and regulating the floodplain (and potentially, the capacity of waste-water reservoirs), and reduce the demands of the automobility state.

The Recycled Park is a holistic approach to limiting the expense of waste. The employment of greenery has air-purifying effects, to reduce pollution. Additionally, the modular, hexagonal design allows reconstruction of each "island"; this space thus also offers environmental sustainability, as well as an open space for community-growing and other social opportunities.

=== Urban farming ===
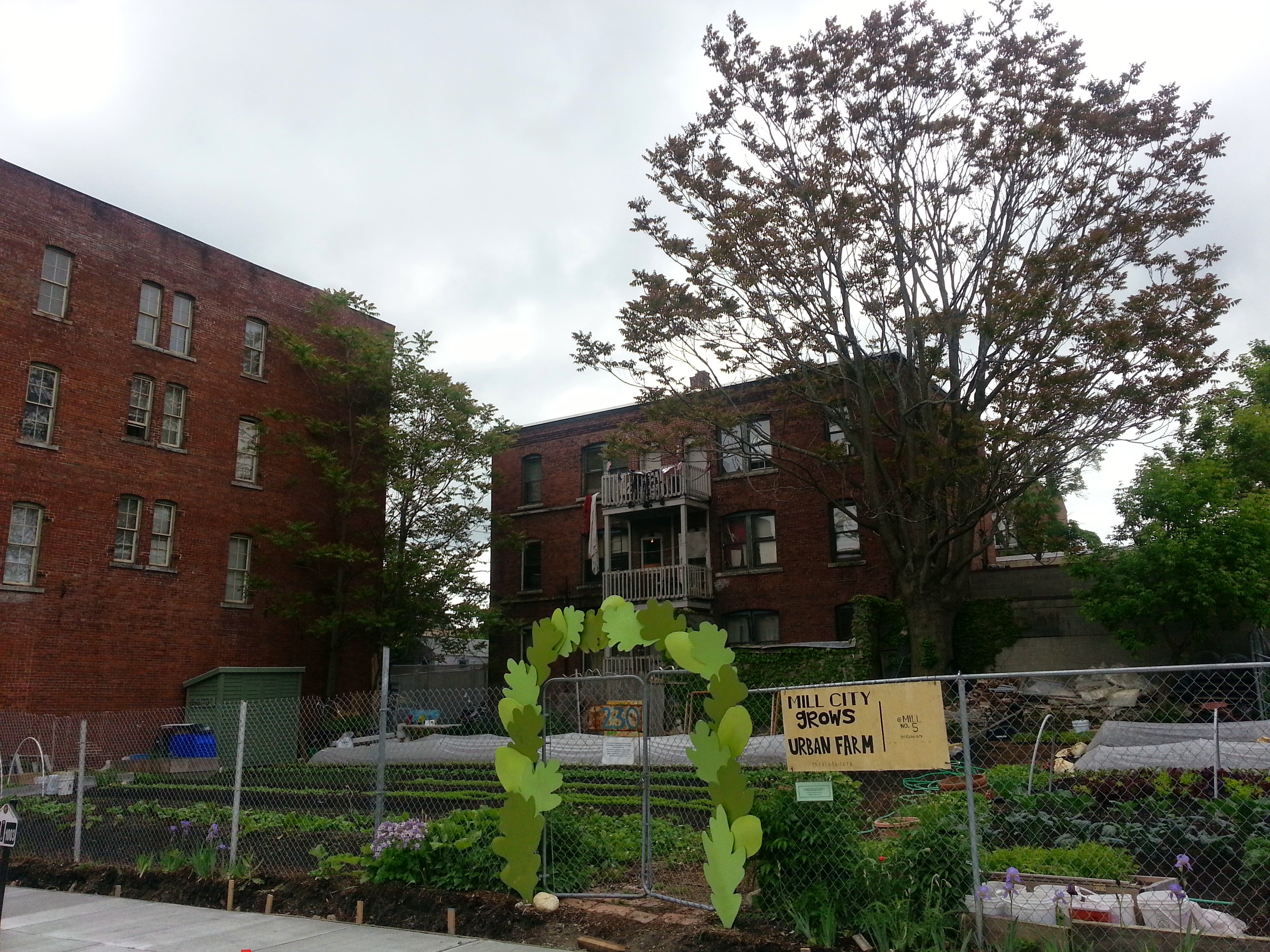
Urban farming in Lowell, Massachusetts

Urban farming is the process of growing and distributing food, as well as raising animals, in and around a city or in urban areas. According to the RUAF Foundation, urban farming is different from rural agriculture because it is integrated into the urban economic and ecological system: urban agriculture is embedded in and interacting with the urban ecosystem. Such linkages include the use of urban residents as the key workers, use of typical urban resources (such as utilizing organic waste as compost or urban wastewater for irrigation), direct links with urban consumers, direct impacts on urban ecology (positive and negative), being part of the urban food system, competing for land with other urban functions, being influenced by urban policies and plans. One motivation for urban agriculture in sustainable cities includes saving energy that would be used in food transportation. Urban farming infrastructure can include common areas for community gardens or farms, as well as common areas for farmers markets in which the food items grown within the city can be sold to the residents of the urban system.

Tiny forests or miniature forests is a new concept where many trees are grown on a small patch of land. These forests are said to grow 10x faster and 30x denser with 100x biodiversity than larger forests. Additionally, they are 100% organic. The ratio of shrub layer, sub-tree layer, tree layer, and canopy layer of the miniature forest along with the percentage of each tree species are planned and fixed before planting so as to promote biodiversity.

=== Renewable Energy in Eco Industrial Parks ===
Due to the such close proximity of buildings in eco industrial parks, renewable energy is a method that would benefit the energy output created in the area. Since there are many types of renewable energies, it is essential to pick the one that can create the most energy since eco industrial parks are so energy demanding. Based on a study done by Process Systems Engineering Center, a variety of renewable energies were tested, and it was found that biomass energy is able to produce the largest amount of energy output. Because some renewable energies like solar and wind are inconsistent or depend on an unchanging source to produce energy, biomass was able to be more persistent than other sources.

Because areas such as eco industrial parks have such a high energy demand, putting more effort into being sustainable is crucial to citywide and even worldwide sustainability. Eco industrial parks and cities in general account for almost all energy use. So, cities that use sustainable energy become more adaptable, decreasing the risk of worsening climate change effects, and creating economic and social issues.

=== New Urbanism ===
The most clearly defined form of walkable urbanism is known as the Charter of New Urbanism. It is an approach for successfully reducing environmental impacts by altering the built environment to create and preserve smart cities that support sustainable transport. Residents in compact urban neighbourhoods drive fewer miles and have significantly lower environmental impacts across a range of measures, compared with those living in sprawling suburbs. The concept of circular flow land use management has also been introduced in Europe to promote sustainable land use patterns that strive for compact cities and a reduction of greenfield land taken by urban sprawl.

Sustainable architecture, a recent movement of New Classical Architecture, promotes a sustainable approach towards construction that appreciates and develops smart growth, walkability, vernacular tradition, and classical design. This in contrast to modernist and globally uniform architecture and opposes solitary housing estates and suburban sprawl. Both trends started in the 1980s.

In 2011, Isam Shahrour and colleagues including Oras Abbas, Amani Abdallah, and Yves Abou Rjeily launched a large-scale smart and sustainable city demonstrator at University of Lille. The project, described in the chapter "Lessons from a Large Scale Demonstrator of the Smart and Sustainable City," uses the university campus—home to about 25,000 people—as a testbed for urban technologies.

=== Individual buildings (LEED) ===
The Leadership in Energy and Environmental Design (LEED) Green Building Rating System encourages and accelerates global adoption of sustainable green building and development practices through the creation and implementation of universally understood and accepted tools and performance criteria.

LEED, or Leadership in Energy and Environmental Design, is an internationally recognized green building certification system. LEED recognizes whole building sustainable design by identifying key areas of excellence including: Sustainable Sites, Water Efficiency, Energy and Atmosphere, Materials and Resources, Indoor Environmental Quality, Locations & Linkages, Awareness and Education, Innovation in Design, Regional Priority. In order for a building to become LEED certified sustainability needs to be prioritized in design, construction, and use. One example of sustainable design would be including a certified wood like bamboo. Bamboo is fast growing and has an incredible replacement rate after being harvested. By far the most credits are rewarded for optimizing energy performance. This promotes innovative thinking about alternative forms of energy and encourages increased efficiency.

A new district in Helsinki, Finland is being made almost entirely using timber. This timber is a form of a Laminated Veneer Lumbar (LVL) that has high standards of fire resistance. The idea is that wood construction has a much smaller CO_{2} footprint than concrete and steel construction and thus, this project is going to take Finland's timber architecture to new heights of sustainability.

=== Sustainable Sites Initiative (SSI) ===
Sustainable Sites Initiative, a combined effort of the American Society of Landscape Architects, The Lady Bird Johnson Wildflower Center at The University of Texas at Austin, and the United States Botanic Garden, is a voluntary national guideline and performance benchmark for sustainable land design, construction and maintenance practices. The building principles of SSI are to design with nature and culture, use a decision-making hierarchy of preservation, conservation, and regeneration, use a system thinking approach, provide regenerative systems, support a living process, use a collaborative and ethical approach, maintain integrity in leadership and research, and finally foster environmental stewardship. All of these help promote solutions to common environmental issues such as greenhouse gases, urban climate issues, water pollution and waste, energy consumption, and health and wellbeing of site users. The main focus is hydrology, soils, vegetation, materials, and human health and well-being.

In SSI, the main goal for hydrology in sites is to protect and restore existing hydrologic functions. To design storm water features to be accessible to site users, and manage and clean water on site. For site design of soil and vegetation many steps can be done during the construction process to help minimize the urban heat island effects, and minimize the building heating requirements by using plants.

=== Regenerative Architecture ===
Regenerative architecture is usually applied to remediate brownfield sites. Still, it can encompass a broader mindset to help an ecosystem, region, or site recover during the lifetime of a structure, during construction and operation. Regenerative architecture tends to require buildings to self-sustain themselves, including generating their sources of power and water. However, it is essential to acknowledge that a structure should only consume what it can recover while also facilitating an area for regeneration. This design mindset differs from the term sustainability as it seeks to contribute the most to an environment instead of reducing the most harm (an efficiency paradigm). This calls for a more holistic engagement with a singular site rather than broad assumptions about a general ecology. Regenerative architecture also extends beyond ecological concerns and can encompass improving social value. Since brownfields typically reside near or within human settlements, regenerative design can enhance human well-being as a site for engagement while also considering ecological needs. It is a way of synchronizing stewardship towards recovery and resilience through design while also considering the social and economic dimensions of these problems.

Regenerative "refers to a process that repairs, recreates or revitalizes its own sources of energy or air, water or any other matter." For design, this means considering the impacts of products (or by-products) from Cradle-to-Grave and the cycle of resource consumption throughout these processes. A positive-impact building is a regenerative one.

Examples include producing "more energy & treated water that the building consumes . . . the ability to provide habitat for lost wildlife and plant species, restore the natural hydrology by recharging the groundwater system, compost waste, and create opportunities for urban agriculture. Since these designs are capable of creating sustenance, they can be considered more economically viable, less dependable and more resilient. Converting unused industrial spaces into accessible green parks is a minor change in achieving regeneration, like the Phra Pok Klao Sky Park (a green park in the congested city of Bangkok), and The New York High Line.

=== The Regenerative Paradigm ===
The Anthropocene era encompasses the detrimental effects on pollution, biodiversity and climate that humans have created. In the building sector, structures have contributed to "40% of carbon emission, 14% of water consumption and 60% of waste production worldwide" in 2006.

The term sustainability, largely publicized in the 1987 Bruntland Report, was a vital yardstick for institutions and governments to acknowledge the impact humans have made and generated a stream of thought where ecosystems became considerations in national agendas. The design lexicon has expanded over time "from issues of ecology, habitat, energy or pollution to address waste, lifecycle, community, sustainability and climate change" with notions of "organic or natural design . . . replaced by green, environmental, sustainable or resilient building." Still, the definition where sustainable development "meets the needs of the present without compromising the ability of future generations to meet their own needs" gears towards harm reduction, but offers enough flexibility for regions to develop their own specific guidelines. The 2013 Intergovernmental Panel on Climate Change (IPCC) report made the scientific and public community aware that the sustainable efficiency paradigm is leading towards a degenerative cycle.

The Anthropocene era calls for action leading toward regeneration to reverse the impacts humans have caused instead of minimizing harm and maximizing efficiency. Since regenerative architecture seeks to restore an ecological site, it acknowledges that recovery and remediation are ongoing. Indigenous peoples and their methods of vernacular architecture have achieved similar perspectives in material sourcing as regenerative architecture, and the mindset of Regenerative Architecture includes bridging the human-nature paradox for the scope, complexity and diversity of needs for modern structures.

=== Principles ===
Regenerative Architecture can implement various standards like Life Cycle Assessments and Building Environmental Assessments (like LEED); however, regeneration is an ongoing activity, so it becomes contingent on ecological results. Regenerative architecture can use existing standards and principles to situate regeneration in a contemporary sustainability context, but it should extend beyond these frameworks to quantify various ecological impacts during the life-time of a building.

Sustainability manifests in various forms of standardization and testing, creating frameworks such as Lifecycle Analysis (LCA) to assess the entire life-end-cycle of materials, to industry-specific systems like Building Environmental Assessments (BEAs) that consider broader areas of building and living performance to simplify integration within industry. BEAs reflect specific comprehensive (often esoteric) LCA principles through a simplified credit-weighing scale encompassing building environments and living performance. These areas apply more directly to architecture and are more accessible to decision-makers. These frameworks are very helpful in the design and construction phase, and regenerative frameworks can help extend these concepts towards future ecological resilience and evolution. Considerations include the safety and accountability of material sourcing, the reusability of the materials, renewable energy and carbon management, water impact, and social fairness.

=== Eco-cities ===
Eco-cities are rooted in various urban planning traditions, including the early garden city movement initiated by Ebenezer Howard. These early efforts sought self-contained, green, and interconnected communities. In the latter 20th century, a broader understanding of ecological systems prompted the need for cities to address their ecological impact both locally and globally. Concepts like "urban metabolism" and McHarg's ecological site planning emerged. The term "ecocity" was coined by Richard Register in the 1980s during the rise of sustainability concerns, as outlined in the Brundtland Commission Report. Sustainability in urban planning focuses on inter-generational equity, environmental protection, and more. In the 2000s, resilience became a key perspective, highlighting the importance of ecological and social resilience in cities facing climate change challenges.

== Transportation ==
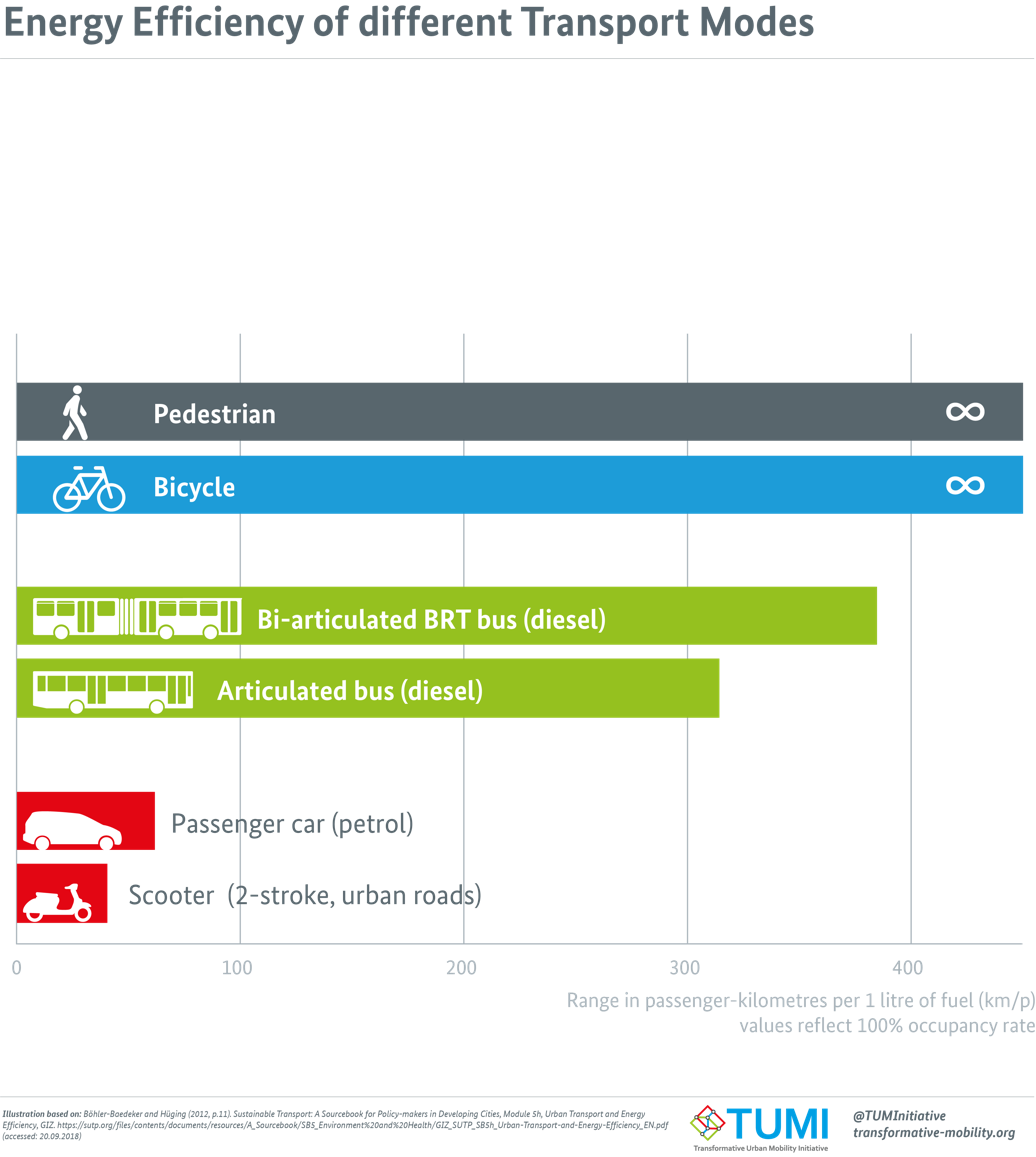

As major focus of the sustainable cities, sustainable transportation attempts to reduce a city's reliance and use of greenhouse emitting gases by utilizing eco-friendly urban planning, low environmental impact vehicles, and residential proximity to create an urban center that has greater environmental responsibility and social equity.

Poor transportation systems lead to traffic jams and high levels of pollution. Due to the significant impact that transportation services have on a city's energy consumption, the last decade has seen an increasing emphasis on sustainable transportation by developmental experts. Currently, transportation systems account for nearly a quarter of the world's energy consumption and carbon dioxide emission. A 2025 study on urban passenger transport carbon reduction pathways reported that the transport sector contributes about 24% of global carbon emissions and that urban passenger transport is a major contributor. The study also noted that in China, the rapid increase in vehicle ownership and urban population density has led to an annual rise of about 1.7% in transportation-related carbon emissions. In order to reduce the environmental impact caused by transportation in metropolitan areas, sustainable transportation has three widely agreed-upon pillars that it utilizes to create more healthy and productive urban centers.

The Carbon Trust states that there are three main ways cities can innovate to make transport more sustainable without increasing journey times – better land use planning, modal shift to encourage people to choose more efficient forms of transport, and making existing transport modes more efficient.

Japan has been reported to have used the piezoelectric technology to turn people who walk into power sources. They have been installed for the intention of clean floors and the use of renewable energy, with the main reason being to generate sustainable urban energy. These have been installed in many busy areas such as Shibuya Station and may other places. Though it may only produce little electricity per person, it can help power up low energy devices. However, with around 3.8 million passengers walking through, it can power up light displays, LED information boards, and sensors. With Japan's idea to install these, this has changed the way we can view sustainable energy solutions. The technology used is low operational which means it is sustainable on the business side, whilst the message of implementing sustainable solutions like this is spread around and causing awareness. A reason why it has not been installed globally and in many places is because the installation, maintenance, and costs are quite high but in the future, there could be a solution made for this.

=== Car free city ===
The concept of car free cities or a city with large pedestrian areas is often part of the design of a sustainable city. A large part of the carbon footprint of a city is generated by cars so the car free concept is often considered an integral part of the design of a sustainable city. Large parts of London city are to be made car-free to allow people to walk and cycle safely following the COVID-19 lockdown. Similarly, 47 miles of bike lanes are planned to be opened in Bogotá, Colombia in addition to the existing 75-mile network of streets that was recently made to be traffic-free all week. New urbanism frees residents of Masdar City, UAE from automobiles and makes possible walkable and sustainable communities by integrating daily facilities such as plazas and sidewalks into the neighborhoods. Public transit systems like the Group Rapid Transit and the Metro provide direct access to wide areas of Masdar, as well as Abu Dhabi's CBD, and other parts of the city. In the United States, the most walkable cities are New York, San Francisco, and Jersey City.The COVID-19 pandemic gave birth to proposals for radical change in the organisation of the city, such as the Manifesto for the Reorganisation of the city after COVID19, published in Barcelona by architecture and urban theorist Massimo Paolini and signed by more than 2000 people, among them 160 academics and 350 architects, being the elimination of the car one of the key elements.

=== Emphasis on proximity ===
Created by eco-friendly urban planning, the concept of urban proximity is an essential element of current and future sustainable transportation systems. This requires that cities be built and added onto with appropriate population and landmark density so that destinations are reached with reduced time in transit. This reduced time in transit allows for reduced fuel expenditure and also opens the door to alternative means of transportation such as bike riding and walking. Furthermore, close proximity of residents and major landmarks allows for the creation of efficient public transportation by eliminating long sprawled out routes and reducing commute time. This in turn decreases the social cost to residents who choose to live in these cities by allowing them more time with families and friends instead by eliminating part of their commute time.

Melbourne is leading the way in creating the 20-minute neighbourhood where biking, walking or using public transport can get you to work, shops or a government agency within 20 minutes. Paris is experimenting with a similar concept in the Rue de Rivoli area where travel time for any destination is capped at 15 minutes.

=== Diversity in modes of transportation ===
Sustainable transportation emphasizes the use of a diversity of fuel-efficient transportation vehicles in order to reduce greenhouse emissions and diversity fuel demand. Due to the increasingly expensive and volatile cost of energy, this strategy has become very important because it allows a way for city residents to be less susceptible to varying highs and lows in various energy prices.

Among the different modes of transportation, the use of alternative energy cars and widespread installation of refueling stations has gained increasing importance, while the creation of centralized bike and walking paths remains a staple of the sustainable transportation movement.

Tesla is one of the pioneers in creating electric vehicles, which is said to reduce CO_{2} footprints of cars. More companies globally are developing their own versions of electric cars and public transport to promote sustainable transportation.

=== Access to transportation ===
In order to maintain the aspect of social responsibility inherent within the concept of sustainable cities, implementing sustainable transportation must include access to transportation by all levels of society. Due to the fact that car and fuel cost are often too expensive for lower-income urban residents, completing this aspect often revolves around efficient and accessible public transportation. Social inclusion is a key goal of the United Nations Sustainable Development Goal 11 – Sustainable Cities and Communities.

In order to make public transportation more accessible, the cost of rides must be affordable and stations must be located no more than walking distance in each part of the city. As studies have shown, this accessibility creates a great increase in social and productive opportunity for city residents. By allowing lower-income residents cheap and available transportation, it allows for individuals to seek employment opportunities all over the urban center rather than simply the area in which they live. This in turn reduces unemployment and a number of associated social problems such as crime, drug use, and violence.

=== Smart transportation ===
In this age of smart cities, many smart solutions are being experimented with to regulate transportation and make public transport more efficient. Israel is reinventing commute by engaging in a public-private partnership that uses algorithms to route public transport according to needs. Using the concept of mobility as a service (MaaS), the people of Israel are encouraged to put in their destination on a mobile application; this data is then processed by the application to reroute transportation according to demands and options of different modes of transportation are suggested to the commuters to choose from. This decreases futile trips and helps the government regulate the number of people in a train or a bus at a time, especially useful in times of a pandemic like the COVID-19 pandemic.

== Urban strategic planning ==
Although there is not an international policy regarding sustainable cities and there are not established international standards, the organization United Cities and Local Governments (UCLG) is working to establish universal urban strategic guidelines. The UCLG is a democratic and decentralized structure that operates in Africa, Eurasia, Latin America, North America, Middle East, West Asian and a Metropolitan section work to promote a more sustainable society. The 60 members of the UCLG committee evaluate urban development strategies and debate these experiences to make the best recommendations. Additionally, the UCLG accounts for differences in regional and national context. All the organizations are making a great effort to promote this concept by media and Internet, and in conferences and workshops. An International conference was held in Italy at Università del Salento and Università degli Studi della Basilicata, called 'Green Urbanism', from 12 to 14 October 2016.

UCLG is a global network of local and regional governments that serves as the representative body for all members of the association. It was founded in 2004 by merging earlier, smaller existing networks and serves as a committee addressing issues such as climate, governance, and local finance. While it doesn't set specific binding international law, it does promote global alignment with the United Nations Sustainable Development Goals. Commitment to the UCLG framework demonstrates a city or community's belief in the credibility of policy. The framework requires a relationship with global banks and climate finance institutions for funding eligibility. These metropolitan decisions can influence specific sectors within labor markets, transportation networks, and investment flows. Urban strategic planning is not only a matter of governance but also a tool that shapes the entire metropolitan population and global positioning.

=== Development ===
Recently, local and national governments and regional bodies such as the European Union have recognized the need for a holistic understanding of urban planning. This is instrumental to establishing an international policy that focuses on cities challenges and the role of the local authorities responses. The sustainable development of urban areas is crucial since more than 56% of the world's population lives in cities. Cities are in the lead of climate action, while being responsible for an estimated 75% of the world's carbon emissions.

Generally, in terms of urban planning, the responsibility of local governments are limited to land use and infrastructure provision excluding inclusive urban development strategies. The advantages of urban strategic planning include an increase in governance and cooperation that aids local governments in establishing performance based-management, clearly identifying the challenges facing local community and more effectively responding on a local level rather than national level, and improves institutional responses and local decision making. Additionally, it increases dialogue between stakeholders and develops consensus-based solutions, establishing continuity between sustainability plans and change in local government; it places environmental issues as the priority for the sustainable development of cities and serves as a platform to develop concepts and new models of housing, energy and mobility. Recent research highlights that digital and hybrid participation tools including online surveys, interactive mapping, and online or in-person workshops increase engagement in urban planning among citizens. These tools support the co-design of urban infrastructure, improve inclusivity, and allow community input to influence sustainability decisions such as green spaces and energy-efficient projects.

Cities and communities are now setting achievable goals and standards for the future. Each city has its own specific goals that align with a mix of the SDG 11 indicators, and there are many different areas of urban sustainability. For instance, some cities are aiming to reduce greenhouse gas emissions by 40-60% in the 2030s. Another area would be sustainable transportation within cities, removing the need for private vehicle use. Other subject areas tracked by cities include air quality standards, tree canopy coverage, and affordable housing targets. Many of these targets align with the SDG 11 indicators and allow cities to manage their own affairs while providing a guiding rail. These standardized metrics also create transparency in the sustainability of the governance within a city.

=== Obstacles ===
The City Development Strategies (CDS) addresses new challenges and provides space for innovative policies that involves all stakeholders. The inequality in spatial development and socio-economic classes paired with concerns of poverty reduction and climate change are factors in achieving global sustainable cities, as highlighted by the United Nations Sustainable Development Goal 11. According to the UCLG there are differences between regional and national conditions, framework and practice that are overcome in the international commitment to communication and negotiation with other governments, communities and the private sector to continue to develop through innovative and participatory approaches in strategic decisions, building consensus and monitoring performance management and raising investment.

Implementation of sustainable cities can be heavily complicated by governance and fiscal constraints. For instance, many cities face the problem of institutionalized fragmentation of control. Sustainability requires a strong, cohesive structure and a combination of many factors to succeed. However, many cities are decentralized when it comes to utility organization, leading to significant separation of sustainable utilities, such as transportation. Another issue arises: a single metropolitan area is only so large. While one metropolitan area may invest in sustainability, neighboring jurisdictions do not, leaving the regional outcome unchanged. Sustainable cities are extremely dependent on capital. Implementing sustainable infrastructure is not always the cheapest, and many systems, such as transit, flood mitigation, and energy, require upfront costs of hundreds of millions of dollars. To pay for these systems, cities have to rely on intergovernmental transfers, property taxes, and municipal bonds. The income of a city's civilians creates disparities between cities. For instance, wealthier cities can issue bonds more easily, while poorer cities face borrowing constraints and higher interest rates.

=== Social factors of sustainable cities ===
According to the United Nations Development Programme (UNDP), over half of the world's population is concentrated in cities, a proportion which is expected to rise to two-thirds by 2050. United Cities and Local Governments has specifically identified 13 global challenges to establishing sustainable cities: demographic change and migration, globalisation of the job market, poverty and unmet Millennium Development Goals, segregation, spatial patterns and urban growth, metropolisation and the rise of urban regions, more political power for local authorities, new actors for developing a city and providing services, decline in public funding for development, the environment and climate change, new and accessible building technologies, preparing for uncertainty and limits of growth and global communications and partnerships.

Sustainability projects in urban areas, including parks, greenways, and other green infrastructure efforts, can also be part of the phenomenon referred to as green gentrification. Environmental enhancements have the ability to increase the appeal of a neighborhood, resulting in rising home values, rents, demographic changes, and displacement of established community members. The results of one study showed that the development of green spaces in European and North American cities between the 1990s and 2000s was strongly associated with gentrification in 17 of those cities from 2000 until 2016. Scholars have described this as the "greenspace paradox" since efforts made by planners to enhance environmental quality and public health can make areas even more unaffordable for those populations. Some scholars have pointed out that sustainability programs need to incorporate equitable approaches in order to avoid displacement.

Sustainability projects in urban areas, including parks, greenways, and other green infrastructure efforts, can also be part of the phenomenon referred to as green gentrification. Environmental enhancements have the ability to increase the appeal of a neighborhood, resulting in rising home values, rents, demographic changes, and displacement of established community members. The results of one study showed that the development of green spaces in European and North American cities between the 1990s and 2000s was strongly associated with gentrification in 17 of those cities from 2000 until 2016. Scholars have described this as the "greenspace paradox" since efforts made by planners to enhance environmental quality and public health can make areas even more unaffordable for those populations. Some scholars have pointed out that sustainability programs need to incorporate equitable approaches in order to avoid displacement.

Sustainability also faces major challenges in data analysis and comparisons between cities. Measuring sustainability data within a city is entirely dependent on the city and on how up-to-date and accurate its measurements are. Because of the lack of standards for measuring sustainability, this creates a large disparity in data, making it difficult to create a concise mark. This benchmark could be wildly inaccurate and would further leave cities with higher income and more data as the only ones that could be relied on for evidence within the global benchmarks.

== Social equity ==
=== Gender ===
Gender associates an individual with a set of traits and behaviors that are construed to be female and/or male by society. Gender is a key part of a person's identity, which can influence their experiences and opportunities as they navigate through life. This is no different for how gender impacts how they navigate through the built environment.

Men and women experience the built environment differently. For over two decades, professionals in urban planning have called for the routine consideration of gender relations and gendered experiences in the urban design process. Specifically, city planners emphasize the need to account for systemic differences in people's lived experiences by gender, when designing built environments that are safe and equitable. This applies to the development of climate resilient cities.

Women represent 80% of people who've been displaced by the climate crisis. Women are more vulnerable to the impacts of climate change because of the roles they are socially assigned by gender. For instance, women are primarily responsible for food provision in the household. Unprecedented patterns in the frequency and magnitude of floods and droughts – due to climate change – directly impact the caregiving responsibilities of many women, causing them to disproportionately suffer from the consequences of these natural disasters.

The inequitable distribution of the burden of climate change by gender is unjust and can be addressed in the design of sustainable cities. Achieving gender equality is not only ethically important but economically smart, since supporting female development benefits economic growth. Moreover, it's socially and economically relevant to design sustainable cities not only for women, but by women.

Notable women spearheading the sustainable city movement include mayors Anne Hidalgo, Ada Colau Ballano, Claudia Lopez, Yvonne Aki-Sawyerr, Muriel Bowser, Patricia de Lille, Helen Fernandez, and Clover Moore. Other female leaders include Christina Figueres, Patricia Espinosa, Laurence Tubiana, and Hakima El Haite.

=== Race and Income ===
Mobility or the ability to move/go places is essential to daily life. Our mobility is primarily determined by the transportation infrastructure that surrounds us. Throughout US history, mobility and right to place have been regulated through codified social rules of who can go where, and how. Many of these rules were drawn along racial/ethnic and nationalistic lines.

Discriminatory housing and transit policies, like red lining, have compounded the oppressive living conditions marginalized racial groups have been subjected to centuries, and have limited the socioeconomic opportunities of future generations. The legacies of these discriminatory policies are responsible for many environmental injustices we see today.

Environmental injustice refers to the unequal distribution of risk to environmental threats, with vulnerable populations – e.g., people of low- and middle-income (LMI) and people of color (POC) – experiencing the greatest exposure and least protection. Environmental injustice is pervasive and manifests in many ways, from contaminated drinking water to mold-infested housing stock. One example of environmental injustice is the varying burden of heat exposure on different racial and socioeconomic groups.

Urban areas often experience higher surface temperatures than less developed regions because the concentrated impermeable surfaces are good at absorbing heat, creating the "heat-island" effect mentioned earlier. The risk of adverse health effects caused by the heat island effect is and will be compounded by the increasing frequency in heat waves due to the climate crisis. This threat is quite dangerous for vulnerable populations – including infants and the elderly – who lack access to air conditioning and/or tree coverage to cool down. This limited adaptive capacity to urban heat is concentrated in LMI and historically segregated neighborhoods.

Specifically, neighborhoods in cities that were historically targeted by redlining and divestment experience higher average land surface temperatures than surrounding areas. These differences in surface temperatures embody the legacy of discriminatory housing policies in the US, and highlight how historic urban planning practices will interact with the effects of the climate crisis. We must create the sustainable cities of the future with these historic practices in mind. The heat island effect also exacerbates the impacts of another form of environmental injustice that disproportionately affects minority and low-income groups: air pollution.

The adverse impacts of UHI are unevenly distributed across urban settlements and have been shown to affect poor and minority neighborhoods disproportionately. A study on more than 5,700 urban areas within the United States indicated that poor regions possess around 15% less canopy cover compared to rich regions, with a higher average surface temperature of between 2 °F and 3 °F (between 1 °C and 1.5 °C) compared to rich regions. Differences in such environmental features can be linked to land use patterns, such as the presence of impermeable surfaces and vegetation cover. Urban scientists have explained such trends as a consequence of unequal planning processes that led to environmental injustices among urban areas through redlining and urban development practices. In addition, urban warming has contributed to the adverse impacts associated with heat illness, energy consumption, and health challenges.

Urban infrastructure projects that produce environmental toxins – like industrial plants and highways – are frequently built near or in LMI and POC communities because of favorable zoning codes, cheaper land prices, and less political backlash. This is not because residents don't care, but because they often lack the time, resources, and connections necessary to prevent such construction. In turn, pollutant-producing operations disproportionately impact LMI and POC communities, harming the health outcomes of these groups.

A study by the University of Minnesota found that if nitrogen dioxide levels (NO_{2} – a product of the combustion of fossil fuels) in non-white communities were reduced to equal those in white communities, there would be around 7,000 fewer deaths from heart disease per year. This mortality disparity highlights the health impacts of discriminatory zoning and urban planning policies, which disproportionately expose LIM and POC communities to air pollution. The disparity also shows how much we have to gain from sustainable transportation reform which eliminates combustion-engine vehicles.

The inequitable breakdown of exposure to environmental risks by race and income reinforces the understanding that the climate crisis is a social issue, and that environmental justice depends upon racial justice. There is no one right way to address these issues. Proposed solutions include eliminating single-family zoning, pricing a minimum proportions of housing units for LMI households, and requiring community engagement in future urban planning projects. To select the best combination of solutions to create sustainable cities tailored to their environments, each city must be designed for all community members, by all community members.

Leaders in the environmental justice movement include Robert Bullard, Benjamin Chavis, Peggy Shepard, Kandi Moseett-White, Mustafa Santiago Ali, Jamie Margolin, Elizabeth Yeampierre, LeeAnne Walters, and Dana Johnson.

== Examples ==
=== Australia ===
==== Adelaide ====
===== Urban forests =====
In Adelaide, South Australia (a city of 1.3 million people) Premier Mike Rann (2002 to 2011) launched an urban forest initiative in 2003 to plant 3 million native trees and shrubs by 2014 on 300 project sites across the metro area. The projects range from large habitat restoration projects to local biodiversity projects. Thousands of Adelaide citizens have participated in community planting days. Sites include parks, reserves, transport corridors, schools, water courses and coastline. Only trees native to the local area are planted to ensure genetic integrity. Premier Rann said the project aimed to beautify and cool the city and make it more liveable; improve air and water quality and reduce Adelaide's greenhouse gas emissions by 600,000 tonnes of CO_{2} a year. He said it was also about creating and conserving habitat for wildlife and preventing species loss.

===== Solar power =====
The Rann government also launched an initiative for Adelaide to lead Australia in the take-up of solar power. In addition to Australia's first 'feed-in' tariff to stimulate the purchase of solar panels for domestic roofs, the government committed millions of dollars to place arrays of solar panels on the roofs of public buildings such as the museum, art gallery, Parliament, Adelaide Airport, 200 schools and Australia's biggest rooftop array on the roof of Adelaide Showgrounds' convention hall which was registered as a power station.

===== Wind power =====
South Australia went from zero wind power in 2002 to wind power making up 26% of its electricity generation by October 2011. In the five years preceding 2011 there was a 15% drop in emissions, despite strong economic growth.

===== Waste recycling =====
For Adelaide the South Australian government also embraced a Zero Waste recycling strategy, achieving a recycling rate of nearly 80% by 2011 with 4.3 million tonnes of materials diverted from landfill to recycling. On a per capita basis, this was the best result in Australia, the equivalent of preventing more than a million tonnes of CO_{2} entering the atmosphere. In the 1970s container-deposit legislation was introduced. Consumers are paid a 10 cent rebate on each bottle, can, or container they return to recycling. In 2009 non-reusable plastic bags used in supermarket checkouts were banned by the Rann Government, preventing 400 million plastic bags per year entering the litter stream. In 2010 Zero Waste SA was commended by a UN Habitat Report entitled 'Solid Waste Management in the World Cities'.

==== Melbourne ====
- City of Merri-bek. The City of Merri-bek in Melbourne's north, has programs for becoming carbon neutral, one of which is Zero Carbon Merri-bek, amongst other existing sustainable implementations and proposals.
- City of Melbourne. Over the past 10 years, various methods of improving public transport have been implemented, car free zones and entire streets have also been implemented.

==== Sydney ====
Sydney was ranked the most sustainable city in Australia by the 2018 Arcadis Sustainable Cities Index. While most cities in Australia ranked low in the green sustainability categories, a lot of them have made a remarkable shift to improve social sustainability by being more inclusive, supporting culture and general happiness among its people.

==== City of Greater Taree, New South Wales ====
The City of Greater Taree north of Sydney has developed a masterplan for Australia's first low-to-no carbon urban development.

=== Austria ===
Vienna is aiming for only 20% of trips to be made by automobile.

=== Brazil ===
Belo Horizonte, Brazil was created in 1897 and is the third-largest metropolis in Brazil, with 2.4 million inhabitants. The Strategic Plan for Belo Horizonte (2010–2030) is being prepared by external consultants based on similar cities' infrastructure, incorporating the role of local government, state government, city leaders and encouraging citizen participation. The need for environmentally sustainable development is led by the initiative of new government following planning processes from the state government. Overall, the development of the metropolis is dependent on the land regularization and infrastructure improvement that will better support the cultural technology and economic landscape. Despite being a developing or newly industrialized nation, it is home to two sustainable cities. The southern cities of Porto Alegre and Curitiba are often cited as examples of urban sustainability.

Curitiba, the capital city of Paraná, adopted an integrated urban development model combining public transport, land-use planning, environmental protection and waste management which has contributed to fuel consumption approximately 3% lower than in other major Brazilian cities, and 70% of residents actively participating in recycling.

=== Cameroon ===
- Bafut, is a town and traditional kingdom which is working towards becoming an eco-city by 2020, through the Bafut Council Eco-city Project.

=== Canada ===
Since 2016 the Green Score City Index has been studying the urban footprints of Canadian cities. It uses recognized governmental and institutional data to calculate the urban footprints of 50 cities.

- Vancouver had 2018's highest green score for large cities.
- Burlington had 2018's highest green score for medium cities.
- Victoria had 2018's highest green score for small cities.

Most cities in Canada have sustainability action plans which are easily searched and downloaded from city websites.

In 2010, Calgary ranked as the top eco-city in the planet for its, "excellent level of service on waste removal, sewage systems, and water drinkability and availability, coupled with relatively low air pollution." The survey was performed in conjunction with the reputable Mercer Quality of Living Survey.

=== China ===
The Chinese government has launched three sustainable city programs to promote pilot projects and foster innovation. Beginning in the early 2000s, China acknowledged the importance of sustainable development in addressing the challenges brought about by rapid urbanization and industrialization. As a result, hundreds of eco-city projects have been initiated throughout the country, making China home to the world's largest eco-city program.

- Tianjin: Sino-Singapore Tianjin Eco-city is a large and one of the first ecocity collaboration project created with the cooperation between China and Singapore, in November 2007, covering an area of 31.23 km^{2}. Locating at Binhai, Tianjin, it has been rated as the Eco-city with the most living experience in 2018.
- Dongtan Eco-city, Shanghai: The project, located in the east of Chongming Island developed by Arup and Parthers, was scheduled to accommodate 50,000 residents by 2010, but its developer has currently put construction on hold. An additional project was made in 2007 in this area: an Eco-Village based on the concept made by an Italian professor from the School of Architecture of Tianjin University.
- Huangbaiyu, Benxi, Liaoning is a small village of 42 homes that has come under great criticism: most of the homes are unoccupied by villagers.
- Nanjing: As of April 2008, an ecocity collaboration project is being proposed here.
- Rizhao, Shandong mandates solar water heaters for households, and has been designated the Environmental Model City by China's SEPA.
- Chengdu Tianfu District Great City is a planned city located just outside Chengdu that is planned to be sustainable and has the goal of being a self-sustaining city that discourages the use of cars.
- Dalian, Liaoning: The 100 MW Dalian Flow Battery Energy Storage Peak-shaving Power Station, with the largest power and capacity in the world so far, was connected to the grid in Dalian, China, on September 29, and it was put into operation in mid-October.

==== Hong Kong ====
The government portrays the proposed Hung Shui Kiu New Town as an eco-city. The same happened with the urban development plan on the site of the former Kai Tak Airport.

=== Denmark ===
Two comprehensive studies were carried out for the whole of Denmark in 2010 (The IDA Climate Plan 2050) and 2011 (The Danish Commission on Climate Change Policy). The studies analysed the benefits and obstacles of running Denmark on 100% renewable energy from the year 2050. There is also a larger, ambitious plan in action: the Copenhagen 2025 Climate Plan.

On a more local level, the industrial park in Kalundborg is often cited as a model for industrial ecology. However, projects have been carried out in several Danish cities promoting 100% renewable energy. Examples include Aalborg, Ballerup and Frederikshavn. Aalborg University has launched a master education program on sustainable cities (Sustainable Cities @ Aalborg University Copenhagen). See also the Danish Wikipedia.

- Copenhagen: Cycling in Copenhagen: One of the most bicycle-friendly city's in the world where over 50% of the population get around on bikes. The city has infrastructure that caters to cycling with hundreds of kilometres of curb segregated bike lanes to separate cyclists and car traffic. A notable feature is The Cycle Super Highways which feature elevated bike lanes which ensure fast, unhindered travel between destinations. The city is aiming for just 25% of trips to be made by automobile.

=== Ecuador ===
Loja, Ecuador won three international prizes for the sustainability efforts begun by its mayor Dr. Jose Bolivar Castillo.

=== Finland ===
The Finnish city of Turku has adopted a "Carbon Neutral Turku by 2040" strategy to achieve carbon neutrality via combining the goal with circular economy.

VTT Technical Research Centre of Finland has formulated an EcoCity concept tailored to address the unique requirements of developing countries and emerging economies. Prominent reference examples include EcoCity Miaofeng in China, EcoNBC in Egypt, EcoGrad in St. Petersburg, Russia, UN Gigiri in Kenya, and MUF2013 in Tanzania.

=== France ===
In Paris, bike lanes are being doubled, while electric car incentives are being created. The French capital is banning the most polluting automobiles from key districts.

=== Germany ===
- Freiburg im Breisgau often refers to itself as a green city. It is one of the few cities with a Green mayor and is known for its strong solar energy industry. Vauban, Freiburg is a sustainable model district. All houses are built to a low energy consumption standard and the whole district is designed to be car-free.
- Another green district in Freiburg is Rieselfeld, where houses generate more energy than they consume. There are several other green sustainable city projects such as Kronsberg in Hannover and current developments around Munich, Hamburg, and Frankfurt.
- Berlin: The Tiergarten (park) is a large park that takes up 520 acres and is an example of social sustainability where it is a green space but also used for transportation. The Tiergarten has inter paths where people can safely bike and walk without the disturbance of cars. Paths connect to notable areas within the city, such as government buildings, shopping areas and monuments. Berlin is mimicking London's "superhighways" for cyclists.

=== Iran ===
Isfahan dedicated smart city office began buildings architectures sustainability programs in May 2022.

=== Ireland ===
South Dublin County Council announced plans in late 2007 to develop Clonburris, a new suburb of Dublin to include up to 15,000 new homes, to be designed to achieve the highest of international standards. The plans for Clonburris include countless green innovations such as high levels of energy efficiency, mandatory renewable energy for heating and electricity, the use of recycled and sustainable building materials, a district heating system for distributing heat, the provision of allotments for growing food, and even the banning of tumble driers, with natural drying areas being provided instead.

In 2012 an energy plan was carried out by the Danish Aalborg University for the municipalities of Limerick and County Clare. The project was a short-term 2020 renewable energy strategy giving a 20% reduction in CO_{2} emissions, while ensuring that short-term actions are beneficial to the long-term goal of 100% renewable energy.

=== India ===
India is working on Gujarat International Finance Tec-City or GIFT which is an under-construction world-class city in the Indian state of Gujarat. It will come up on 500 acres (2.0 km^{2}) land. It will also be first of its kind fully Sustainable City. Auroville was founded in 1968 with the intention of realizing human unity, and is now home to approximately 2,000 individuals from over 45 nations around the world. Its focus is its vibrant community culture and its expertise in renewable energy systems, habitat restoration, ecology skills, mindfulness practices, and holistic education. The new capital of Andhra Pradesh is also planned to be a sustainable city in the future. As a part of the UN Global Sustainable Development Goals (SDG) cities initiative, Noida in Uttar Pradesh was selected in 2018 to become one of 25 cities in the world to become models of SDGs by 2025.

=== Indonesia ===
The cities of Bandung, Cimahi, and Soreang in Indonesia become world leaders in zero waste cities program after significantly reducing the amount of waste and improving its management.

=== Korea ===
Songdo IBD is a planned city in Incheon which has incorporated a number of eco-friendly features. These include a central park irrigated with seawater, a subway line, bicycle lanes, rainwater catchment systems, and pneumatic waste collection system. 75% of the waste generated by the construction of the city will be recycled.

Gwanggyo City Centre is another planned sustainable city.

=== Malaysia ===
As of 2014 a Low Carbon Cities programme is being piloted in Malaysia by KeTTHA, the Malaysian Ministry of Energy, Green Technology and Water, Malaysian Green Technology Corporation (GreenTech Malaysia) and the Carbon Trust.

Malacca has a stated ambition to become a carbon-free city, taking steps towards creating a smart electricity grid. This is being done as part of an initiative to create a Green Special Economic Zone, where it is intended that as many as 20 research and development centers will be built focusing on renewable energy and clean technology, creating up to 300,000 new green jobs.

The Federal Department of Town and Country Planning (FDTCP) in peninsular Malaysia is a focal point for the implementation of the Malaysian Urban Rural National Indicators Network for Sustainable Development (MURNInets), which includes 36 sets of compulsory indicators grouped under 21 themes under six dimensions. Most of the targets and standards for the selected indicators were adjusted according to hierarchy of local authorities. In MURNInets at least three main new features are introduced. These include the Happiness Index, an indicator under the quality of life theme to meet the current development trend that emphasizes on the well-being of the community. Another feature introduced is the customer or people satisfaction level towards local authorities' services. Through the introduction of these indicators the bottom-up approach in measuring sustainability is adopted.

=== Morocco ===
Planned for 2023, Zenata is the first African city to be awarded the Eco-City Label. It will include a total of 470 hectares of green spaces. It will also have water retention basins and promotes groundwater recharge and afforestation of the site. The naturally irrigated parks leading to the sea are designed as ecological corridors.

=== New Zealand ===
Waitakere City, a local body that formerly existed in West Auckland, was New Zealand's first eco-city, working from the Greenprint, a guiding document that the City Council developed in the early 1990s.

=== Norway ===
Oslo city was ranked first in the 2019 SDG Index and Dashboards Report for European Cities with a high score of 74.8. In order to achieve its ambitious targets for reducing carbon emissions in the European Green City index, Oslo plans to convert cities to biofuels and has considerably reduced traffic by 4–7% by introducing a congestion charge. Its aim is to cut-down emissions by 50 per cent since 1990 and it has taken a number of transportation, waste recycling, energy consumption and green space measures among others to meet its target.

=== Philippines ===
Clark Freeport Zone is a former United States Air Force base in the Philippines. It is located on the northwest side of Angeles City and on the west side of Mabalacat City in the province of Pampanga, about 40 miles (60 km) northwest of Metro Manila. A multi-billion project will convert the 36,000 ha (89,000 acres) former Clark Air Force Base into a mix of industrial, commercial and institutional areas of green environment. The heart of the project is a 9,450-hectare metropolis dubbed as the "Clark Green City". Builders will use the green building system for environmentally-friendly structures. Its facilities will tap renewable energy such as solar and hydro power.

=== Portugal ===
The organization Living PlanIT is currently constructing a city from scratch near Porto, Portugal. Buildings will be electronically connected to vehicles giving the user a sense of personal eco-friendliness.

=== Pakistan ===
Islamabad, the capital of Pakistan, is full of green spaces and is an eco-friendly city. However, a 2024 study analyzing urban sustainability indicators in Islamabad found that increasing urban sprawl and land degradation are placing its environmental sustainability at risk. The authors emphasize that revised planning and stronger urban governance will be necessary to maintain the city's ecological balance.

=== Saudi Arabia ===
Saudi Arabia recently unveiled a proposed one of the most ambitious eco-city projects; Neom. Development is planned in the northwest region of the country along the Red Sea and would cover over 26,500 km^{2} (10,230 sq-miles). Some of the most notable aspects of this development are The Line and Oxagon. The Line is advertised as a smart city that will stretch for 170 km with easily accessible amenities throughout. Oxagon is a planned floating city off the coast. If built, it will be the largest city.

=== Spain ===
- Bilbao: The city faced economic turmoil following the decline of the steel and port industries but through communication between stakeholders and authorities to create inner-city transformation, the local government benefited from the increase in land value in old port areas. The Strategic Plan for the Revitalisation of Metropolitan Bilbao was launched in 1992 and have flourished regenerating old steel and port industries. The conversion from depleted steel and port industries to one of Europe's most flourishing markets is a prime example of a sustainable project in action.
- Barcelona: The city is planning an urban redesign of civic super blocks, they plan to convert nine-block areas into unified mega block neighbourhoods. The aim is to decrease car-related traffic, noise and pollution by over 20% and to free up to 60% of road areas for reuse as citizen spaces. This is being done because they realized that people in Barcelona die prematurely due to poor air quality and everyday noise levels are deemed harmful. By converting roads to spaces for festivals, farmer markets, bikes, and walkability it promotes a healthier lifestyle and potentially a happier one. In 2020, the European Investment Bank approved a €95 million loan to assist Barcelona in the completion of approximately 40 projects, with an emphasis on climate change and social inequity. The city plans to redevelop streets to create more space for pedestrians and bicyclists, enhance building energy efficiency, and expand social, cultural, and recreational opportunities.
- Madrid: In 2018, Madrid banned all non-resident vehicles from its downtown areas.

=== Singapore ===
Singapore ranked 18th out of 100 cities in the 2024 Arcadis Sustainable Cities Index. Its approach to urban sustainability includes integrating green infrastructure, water management, green buildings and public transportation. Under its City in Nature initiative, 96% of households are within a 10-minute walk of a park as of March 2026. Singapore also reclaims used water as NEWater, one of its Four National Taps alongside local catchment water, imported water and desalination. Approximately 66% of buildings by gross floor area has been greened under its Green Building Masterplan as of December 2025. Singapore has also cultivated a strong public transport usage, with it accounting for 66% of peak-period motorized journeys in 2024.

Despite these initiatives, Singapore is not a fully sustainable city yet. A small country with scarce natural resources, approximately 95% of its electricity is generated using imported natural gas. Extensive land reclamation has also contributed to coastal habitat loss, with a 2015 study finding that intertidal coral reef flats declined from 17.0 km² to 9.5 km² between 1993 and 2011. Domestically, its recycling rate remains low at 11% as of 2025.

=== Sweden ===
- Norra Älvstranden (Swedish), in Gothenburg by the river Göta älv, is an example of a sustainable city in Sweden. It has low environmental impact, and contains passive houses, recycling system for waste, etc.
- Hammarby Sjöstad
- Västra Hamnen or Bo01, Malmö
- Stockholm Royal Seaport

=== Taiwan ===
Taiwan has shown dedication to become a regional leader in sustainable urban development, implementing a range of initiatives across its cities to address environmental challenges and promote green living by integrating environmental, social, and technological strategies to create livable and resilient cities.

- Taipei City has undertaken significant efforts to mitigate the urban heat island effect through its "Taipei Street Trees 15-Year Vision Plan," which focuses on planting new trees and shrubs to connect green spaces and enhance biodiversity. Additionally, the city transformed the former Fudekeng landfill into the Fudekeng Environmental Restoration Park, which now houses Taipei's first large-scale solar power plant.
- New Taipei City has prioritised sustainable transportation by promoting public transit and active travel to reduce greenhouse gas emissions. The Wenzizun Redevelopment Zone is also envisioned by the city government to become a centre of high quality of life in the Greater Taipei Area by 2030, aligning with Sustainable Development Goal 11.
- Kaohsiung has implemented green building regulations, resulting in numerous structures with green rooftops and water retention systems. The city is also home to the world's largest solar-powered sports stadium, underscoring its commitment to renewable energy.
- Tainan was selected as Taiwan's first demonstration city for the Healthy Cities project, focusing on interdisciplinary approaches to public health and urban planning. The city has also repurposed former industrial sites into community spaces, contributing to its sustainable urban development.
- Keelung has advanced sustainable tourism through initiatives like the revitalization of Heping Island Park, promoting environmental education and conservation efforts.
- Taichung transformed a former airport into Phase Shift Park, an ecological urban space featuring diverse plant species and solar-powered technology, serving as a "green lung" for the city.

=== United Arab Emirates ===
- Masdar City, Abu Dhabi is a planned city that relies entirely on solar energy and other renewable energy sources, with a sustainable, zero-carbon, zero-waste ecology.
- Dubai The Sustainable City, Dubai

=== United Kingdom ===
- London has committed to reaching net-zero carbon emissions by 2050. To do so, it aims to drastically reduce the proportion of trips made by cars and also ban all new petrol and diesel cars by 2035. Similarly, according to the UK Green Building Council, 40 per cent of UK's total carbon footprint comes from the built environment. Steel, which is used to make skyscrapers, is responsible for 7 per cent of the global CO_{2} emissions. Timber, especially CLT is a being considered as a great alternative to reduce construction-based emissions.
- The built environment is responsible for around 40% of the UK's total carbon footprint, according to the UK Green Building Council
- London Borough of Sutton is the first One Planet Region in the United Kingdom, with significant targets for reducing the ecological footprint of residents and creating the UK's greenest borough.
- Middlesbrough is another One Planet Region in the United Kingdom.
- Milton Keynes' original design concept aimed for a "forest city" and the foresters of the designers planted millions of trees from its own nursery in Newlands in the following years. Parks, lakes and green spaces cover about 25% of Milton Keynes; as of 2018, there are 22 million trees and shrubs in public open spaces.
- St Davids, the smallest city in the United Kingdom, aims to be the first carbon-neutral city in the world.
- Leicester is the United Kingdom's first environment city.

=== United States ===
- Arcosanti, Arizona
- Coyote Springs Nevada largest planned city in the United States.
- Babcock Ranch Florida a proposed solar-powered city.
- Douglass Ranch in Buckeye Arizona
- Mesa del Sol in Albuquerque, New Mexico
- San Francisco, California is ranked the most sustainable city in the United States according to the 2019 US Cities Sustainable Development Report. Treasure Island, San Francisco: is a project that aims to create a small eco city.
- Sonoma Mountain Village in Rohnert Park, California*

== See also ==
- 2000-watt society
- BedZED
- Blue roof
- Carfree city
- Circles of Sustainability
- Covenant of Mayors
- Cyclability
- Eco hotel
- Eco-cities
- Ecodistrict
- Ecological engineering
- Environmental economics
- Floating ecopolis
- Freeway removal
- Global Ecovillage Network
- Green infrastructure
- Green retrofit
- Green urbanism
- Greening
- Land recycling
- List of most-polluted cities by particulate matter concentration
- Most livable cities
- Pedestrian village
- Roof garden
- Street reclamation
- Sustainable design
- Sustainable Development Goal 11 – 11th of 17 Sustainable Development Goals for sustainable cities
- Sustainable urbanism
- Transition town
- Tree Cities of the World
- Urban design
- Urban forest inequity
- Urban forestry
- Urban green space
- Urban park
- Urban prairie
- Urban reforestation
- Urban vitality
- Walkability
- Walking audit
- Zero-carbon city
