= Eco Park metro station =

Eco Park metro station may refer to:

- Eco Park metro station (Kolkata) on Orange Line (Kolkata Metro)
- Eco Park metro station (Nagpur) on Orange Line (Nagpur Metro)

== See also ==
- Eco Park (disambiguation)
