= Kalundborg Eco-industrial Park =

Industrial symbiosis network in Kalundborg, Denmark

Coordinates: 55°39′38.61″N 11°04′52.22″E

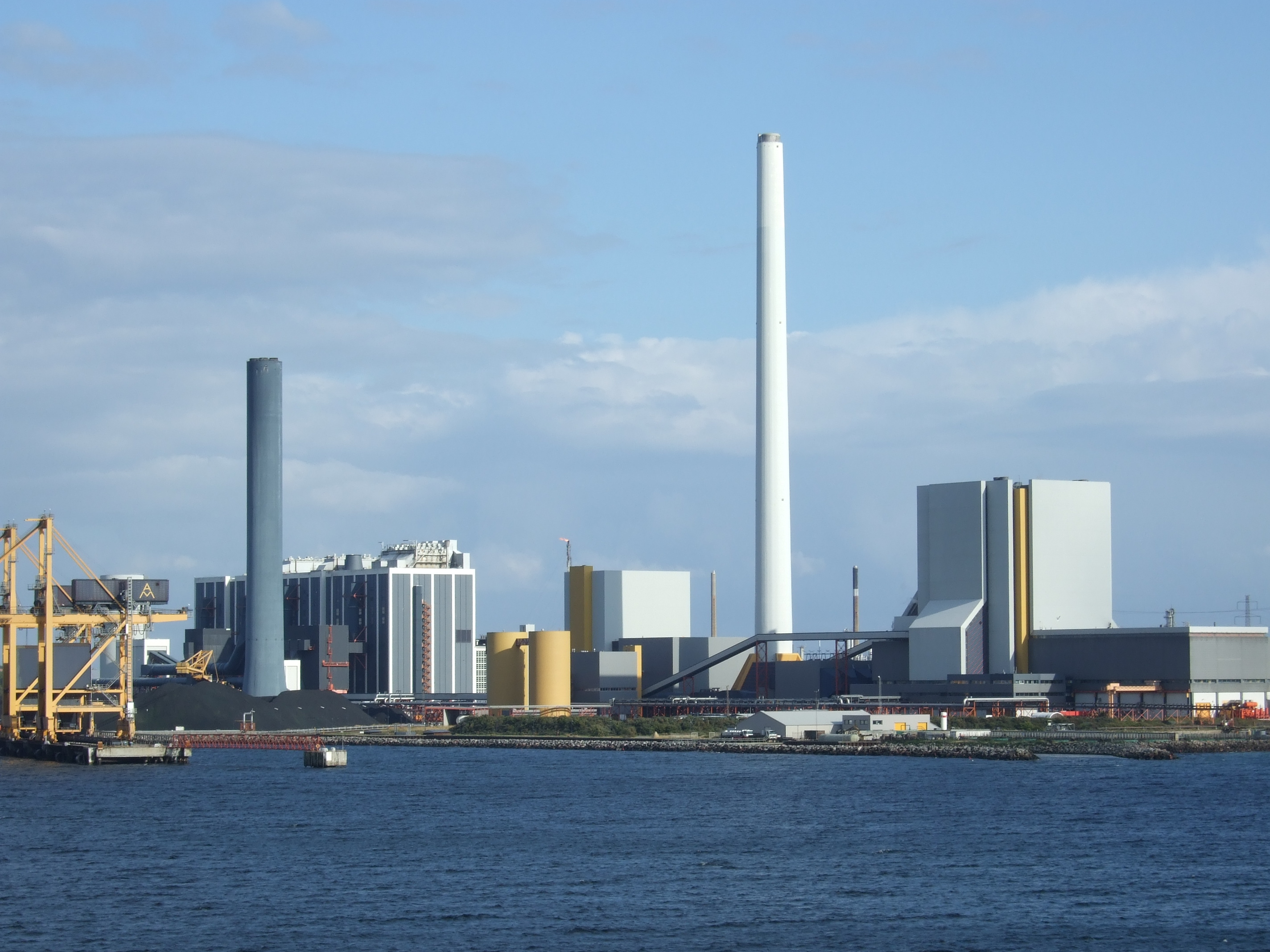
View from around the Asnæs power station.

Kalundborg Eco-Industrial Park is an industrial symbiosis network located in Kalundborg, Denmark, in which companies in the region collaborate to use each other's by-products and otherwise share resources.

The Kalundborg Eco-Industrial Park is the first full realization of industrial symbiosis. The collaboration and its environmental implications arose unintentionally through private initiatives, as opposed to government planning, making it a model for private planning of eco-industrial parks. At the center of the exchange network is the Asnæs Power Station, a 1500 MW coal-fired power plant, which has material and energy links with the community and several other companies. Surplus heat from this power plant is used to heat 3500 local homes in addition to a nearby fish farm, whose sludge is then sold as a fertilizer. Steam from the power plant is sold to Novo Nordisk, a pharmaceutical and enzyme manufacturer, in addition to Statoil oil refinery. This reuse of heat reduces the amount thermal pollution discharged to a nearby fjord. Additionally, a by-product from the power plant's sulfur dioxide scrubber contains gypsum, which is sold to a wallboard manufacturer. Almost all of the manufacturer's gypsum needs are met this way, which reduces the amount of open-pit mining needed. Furthermore, fly ash and clinker from the power plant is used for road building and cement production. These exchanges of waste, water and materials have greatly increased environmental and economic efficiency, as well as created other less tangible benefits for these actors, including sharing of personnel, equipment, and information.

== History ==
The Kalundborg Industrial Park was not originally planned for industrial symbiosis. Its current state of waste heat and materials sharing developed over a period of 20 years. Early sharing at Kalundborg tended to involve the sale of waste products without significant pretreatment. Each further link in the system was negotiated as an independent business deal, and was established only if it was expected to be economically beneficial.

The park began in 1959 with the start up of the Asnæs Power Station. The first episode of sharing between two entities was in 1972 when Gyproc, a plaster-board manufacturing plant, established a pipeline to supply gas from Tidewater Oil Company. In 1981 the Kalundborg municipality completed a district heating distribution network within the city of Kalundborg, which utilized waste heat from the power plant.

Since then, the facilities in Kalundborg have been expanding, and have been sharing a variety of materials and waste products, some for the purpose of industrial symbiosis and some out of necessity, for example, freshwater scarcity in the area has led to water reuse schemes. In particular, 700,000 cubic meters per year of cooling water is piped from Statoil to Asnaes.

A timeline of the creation of the industrial park:

- 1959 The Asnæs Power Station was started up
- 1961 Tidewater Oil Company constructed a pipeline from Lake Tissø to provide water for its operation
- 1963 Tidewater Oil Company's oil refinery is taken over by Esso
- 1972 Gyproc establishes plaster-board manufacturing plant. A pipeline from the refinery to the Gyproc facility is constructed to supply excess refinery gas
- 1973 The Asnæs Power Station is expanded. A connection is built to the Lake Tissø-Statoil pipeline
- 1976 Novo Nordisk starts delivering biological sludge to neighboring farms
- 1979 Asnæs Power Station starts supplying fly ash to cement manufacturers in northern Denmark
- 1981 the Kalundborg municipality completes a district heating distribution network within the city that utilizes waste heat from the power plant
- 1982 Novo Nordisk and the Statoil refinery complete construction of steam supply pipelines from the power plant. By purchasing process steam from the power plant, the companies are able to shut down inefficient steam boilers
- 1987 The Statoil refinery completes a pipeline to supply its effluent cooling water to the power plant for use as raw boiler feed water.
- 1989 The power plant starts using waste heat from its salt cooling water to produce trout and turbot at its local fish farm
- 1989 Novo Nordisk enters into agreement with Kalundborg municipality, the power plant, and the refinery to connect to the water supply grid from Lake Tissø
- 1990 The Statoil refinery completes construction of a sulphur recovery plant. The recovered sulphur is sold as raw material to a sulfuric acid manufacturer in Fredericia
- 1991 The Statoil refinery commissions the building of a pipeline to supply biologically treated refinery effluent water to the power plant for cleaning purposes, and for fly ash stabilization
- 1992 The Statoil refinery commissions the building of a pipeline to supply flare gas to the power plant as a supplementary fuel
- 1993 The power plant completes a stack flue gas desulfurization project. The resulting calcium sulphate is sold to Gyproc, where it replaces imported natural gypsum

== The Symbiosis ==
The relationships among the firms comprising the Kalundborg Eco-Industrial Park form an industrial symbiosis. Generally speaking, the actors involved in the symbiosis at Kalundborg exchange material wastes, energy, water, and information. The Kalundborg network involves a number of actors, including a power station, two big energy firms, a plaster board company, and a soil remediation company. Other actors include farmers, recycling facilities, and fish factories that use some of the material flows. Kalundborg Municipality plays an active role. Additionally, other actors, such as Novoren, a recycling and urban land field firm, are formally part of the network but do not contribute tangibly in the exchange. A researcher studying the evolution of the Kalundborg Symbiosis concluded that a high level of trust between the actors involved represented an essential element to collaborative success.

=== Partners ===
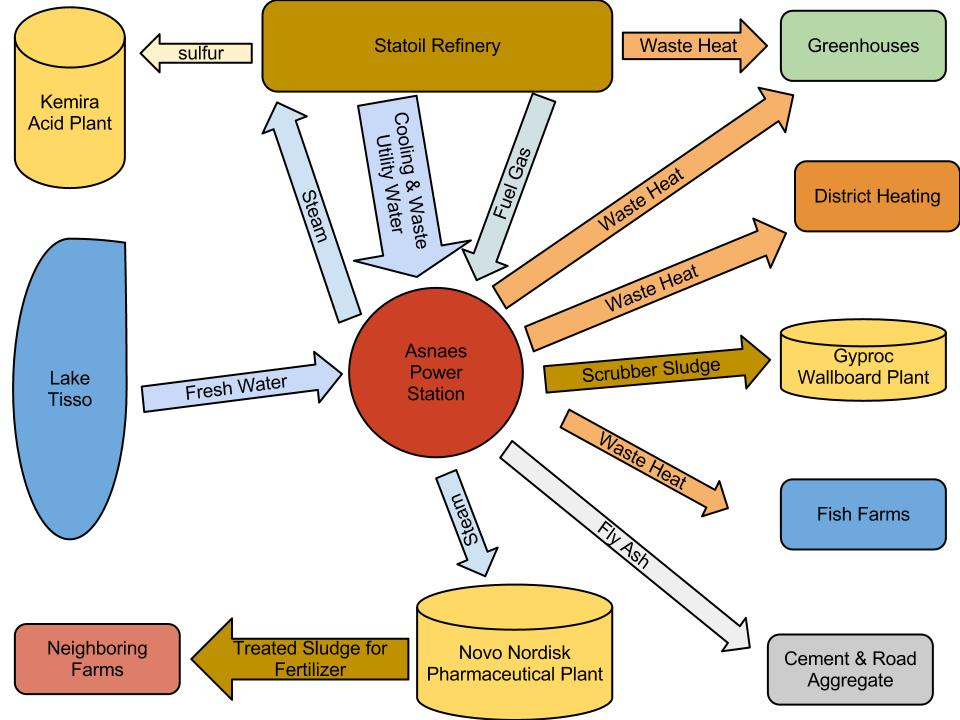
A flowchart to show the material sharing between entities in the Kalundborg Eco-Industrial Park

The Kalundborg Eco-Industrial Park today includes nine private and public enterprises, some of which are some of the largest enterprises in Denmark. The enterprises are:

- Novo Nordisk - Danish company and largest producer of insulin in the world
- Novozymes (2024-:Novonesis)- Danish company and largest enzyme producer in the world
- Gyproc - French producer of gypsum board
- Kalundborg Municipality
- Ørsted A/S - owner of Asnaes Power Station, the largest power plant in Denmark
- RGS 90 - Danish soil remediation and recovery company
- Statoil - Norwegian company which owns Denmark's largest oil refinery
- Kara/Novoren - Danish waste treatment company
- Kalundborg Forsyning A/S - water and heat supplier, as well as waste disposer, for Kalundborg citizens

=== Material Exchanges ===
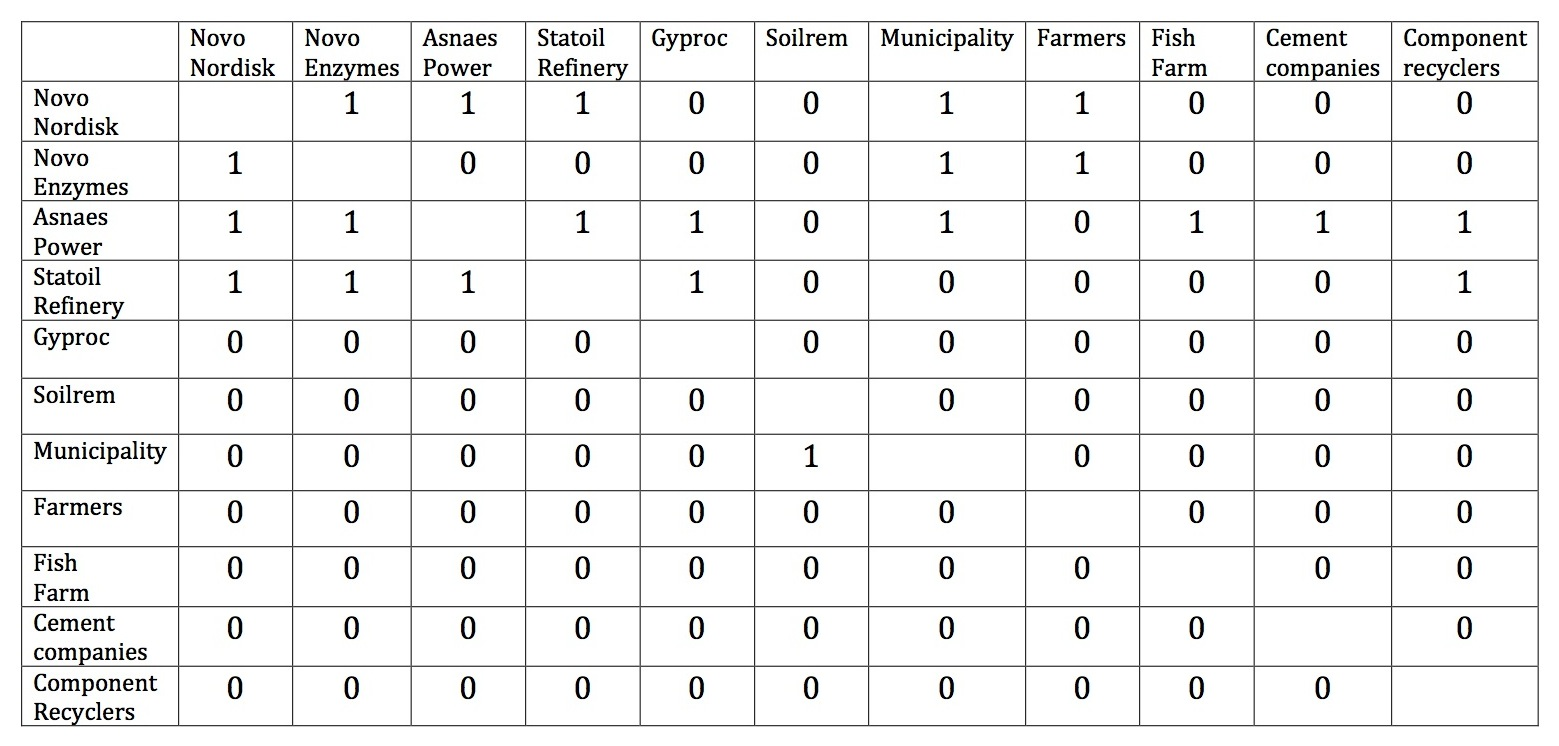
This matrix shows which actors in the Kalundborg Eco-Industrial Park interact with each other.

There are currently over thirty exchanges of materials among the actors of Kalundborg. The Asnaes Power Station is at the heart of the network. The power company gives its steam residuals to the Statoil Refinery, meeting 40% of its steam requirements, in exchange for waste gas from the refinery. The power plant creates electricity and steam from this gas. These products are sent to a fish farm and Novo Nordisk, who receive all of their required steam from Asnaes, and a heating system that supplies 3500 homes. These homeowners pay for the underground piping that supplies their heat, but receive the heat reliably and at a low price. Fly ash from Asnaes is sent to a cement company, and gypsum from its desulfurization process is sent to Gyproc for use in gypsum board. Two-thirds of Gyproc's gypsum needs are met by Asnaes. Statoil Refinery removes sulfur from its natural gas and sells it to a sulfuric acid manufacturer, Kemira. The fish farm sells sludge from its ponds as fertilizer to nearby farms, and Novo Nordisk gives away its own sludge, of which it produces 3,000 cubic meters per day. The sludge is to be refined for biogas for the power plant.

Water reuse schemes have also been developed within Kalundborg. Statoil pipes 700,000 cubic meters of cooling water per year to Asnaes, which purifies it and uses it as "boiler feed-water." Asnaes also uses approximately 200,000 cubic meters of Statoil's treated wastewater per year for cleaning. The 90 °C residual heat from the refinery is not used for district heating due to taxes. Instead, heat pumps are used with the 24 °C waste water as a heat reservoir.

== Savings and environmental impacts ==
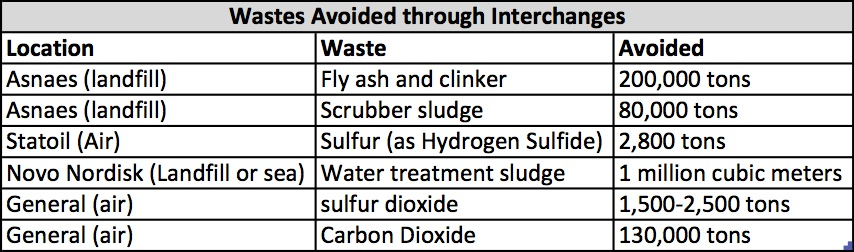
Annual wastes avoided in Kalundborg as of 1997

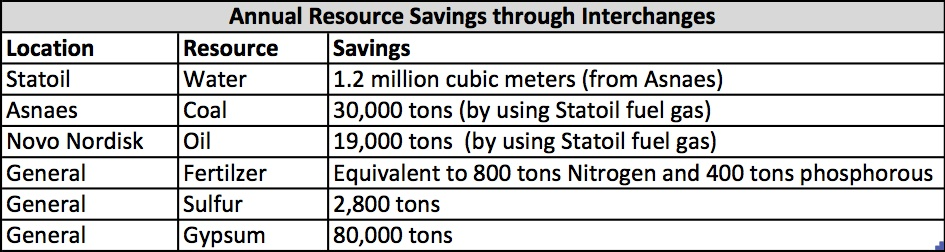
Annual resource savings in Kalundborg as of 1997

Since its start over 25 years ago, Kalundborg has been operating successfully as an eco-industrial park. One of the main goals of industrial symbiosis is to make goods and services that use the least-cost combination of inputs. These relationships were formed on an economic and environmental basis. As mentioned above, there are over thirty exchanges occurring in Kalundborg. While Kalundborg does operate using trades between various firms in the vicinity, it itself is not self-sufficient or contained to the industrial park. There are many trades that occur with companies outside of this park region.

All of these exchanges have contributed to water savings, and savings in fuel and input chemicals. Wastes were also avoided through these interchanges. For example, in 1997, Asnaes (the power station) saved 30,000 tons of coal (~2% of throughput) by using Statoil (large oil refinery) fuel gas. And 200,000 tons of fly ash and clinker were avoided from Asnaes landfill. These resources savings and waste avoidances, documented before 1997, are illustrated in the tables to the right.

A study in 2002 showed that these exchanges also contributed to more than 95% of the total water supply to the power plant. This is up from 70% in 1990. So, the system is becoming more comprehensive in its ability to save groundwater, however, there is still room for improvement. Out of the 1.2 million m^{3} of wastewater discharged from Statoil (the refinery), only 9000 m^{3} were reused at the power plant.

More recent numbers show a vast improvement, when comparing to the numbers from 1997, in resource savings. Data from around 2004 show annual savings of 2.9 million cubic meters of ground water, and 1 million cubic meters of surface water. Gypsum savings are estimated around 170,000 tons, and sulfur dioxide waste avoidance is estimated around 53 Tn. These numbers are mostly estimations. Aspects of the eco-industrial park have changed, and there are many levels to consider when doing these calculations. All together though, these interchanges have shown annual savings of up to $15 million (US), with investments around $78.5 million (US). The total accumulated savings is estimated around $310 million (US).

== As a Model ==
Kalundborg was the first example of separate industries grouping together to gain competitive advantage by material exchange, energy exchange, information exchange, and/or product exchange. The very term industrial symbiosis (IS) was first defined by a station manager in Kalundborg as "a cooperation between different industries by which the presence of each…increases the viability of the others, and by which the demands of society for resource savings and environmental protection are considered".

Kalundborg's success helped generate interest in industrial symbiosis. Developed nations such as the United States began to formulate incentives for corporations to implement materials exchange with other corporations. Industrial and political circles began to look into the implementation of eco-industrial parks (EIPs). Specifically, the United States worked to put into service several planned EIPs. The U.S. President's Council on Sustainable Development in 1996 proposed fifteen eco-industrial parks to pursue the idea of industrial symbiosis. These parks were created by grouping diverse stakeholders with common material flows together, with added governmental incentives to encourage materials exchange. The goal of these planned EIPs was to test if the industrial symbiosis that worked so well in Kalundborg could be replicated. The Council on Sustainable Development also defined 5 major characteristics of a successful EIP to help guide EIP development. These characteristics include: (1) some form of material exchange between multiple separate entities, (2) industries in close proximity to each other, (3) cooperation between plant management of the different corporations, (4) an existing infrastructure for material sharing that does not require much retooling, and (5) "anchor" tenants (large corporation with resources to support early implementation). Devens Regional Enterprise Zone is a good example of a successful EIP in the United States.

Kalundborg became an attractive topic in academia as well because of the obvious sustainability advantages of industrial symbiosis. Research conducted on planning and implementation of eco-industrial parks revealed interesting results. Experts argued over the idea of "planned parks" versus "self organized parks". Research showed systematic failure of forced or planned EIPs. Most successful EIPs originate from industrial symbiosis that occurs naturally during industry life, much like the Kalundborg case. This conclusion served to deflate the momentum that the success of Kalundborg generated. Organizations began to recognize the difficulties associated with forcing eco-industrial parks to coalesce and abandoned the idea.

== See also ==
- Eco-industrial park
- EcoPark - EIP in Hong-Kong
- Industrial ecology
- Industrial symbiosis
