= Echo Park (disambiguation) =

Echo Park is a neighborhood of Central Los Angeles, California.

Echo Park may also refer to:

- Echo Park Lake, Los Angeles
- Echo Park (Colorado), at the confluence of the Green and Yampa Rivers in Dinosaur National Monument
  - Echo Park Dam, a proposed dam at this site that was never built
- Echo Park (1986 film), a 1986 film by Robert Dornhelm
- Echo Park (2014 film), a 2015 film by Amanda Marsalis
- "Echo Park", the second episode of the television series Law & Order: Los Angeles
- Echo Park (novel), a 2006 novel by Michael Connelly
- Echo Park (album), a 2001 album by the British band Feeder
- Echo Park, an album by Keith Barbour, or the title track
- EchoPark, an American chain of used car dealerships

== See also ==
- Eco Park (disambiguation)
