= Asnæs Power Station =

Power station in Denmark

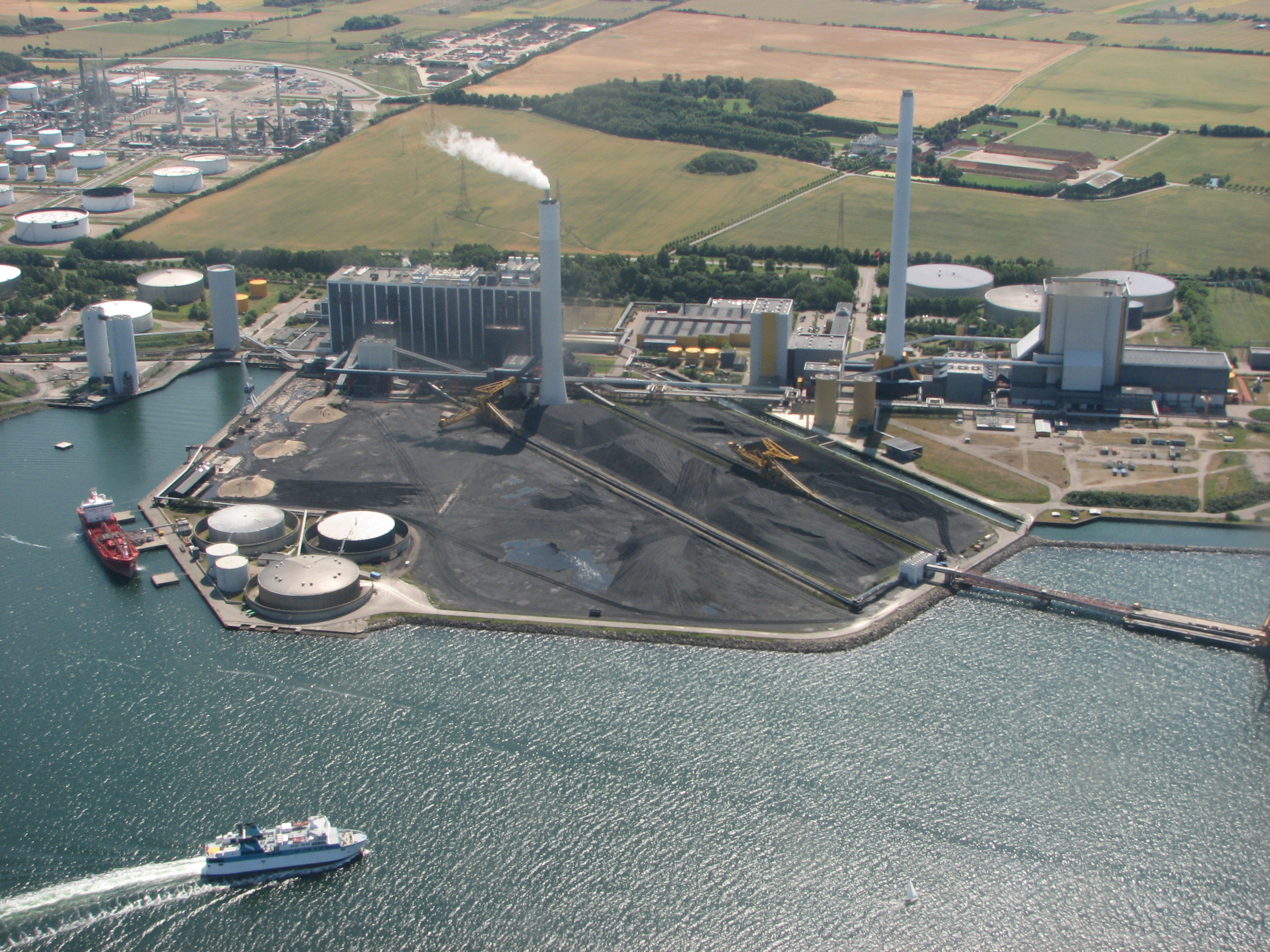
- The Asnæs Power Station
- Country: Denmark
- Location: Kalundborg
- Coordinates: 55°39′40.7″N 11°04′44.2″E
- Status: Operational
- Commission date: 1959
- Owner: Ørsted A/S
- Operator: Ørsted

Thermal power station
- Primary fuel: Woodchips
- Cogeneration?: Yes

Power generation
- Nameplate capacity: 1,057 MW

External links
- Commons: Related media on Commons

The Asnæs Power Station (Danish: Asnæsværket) totay consists of a single train (unit 6) which is a woodchip fueled power plant operated by Ørsted A/S in Kalundborg, Denmark. Historically it has comprised 5 trains of consisted of coal fired heat and power units which deliver 147 MW (Unit 2), 270 MW (Unit 4) and 640 MW (Unit 5). Unit 3 went in service in 1959 and uses a 152.1-metre-tall (499 ft) flue gas stack, while Unit 5, which went into service in 1981, uses a 220.1-metre-tall (722 ft) flue gas stack, the third tallest in Denmark. The woodchip fired unit (unit 6) went into service in 2020, and the remaining coal fired units were shut down at about the same time.

Its two 60m high coal cranes were dismantled in 2016.

== See also ==
- List of power stations in Denmark
- Industrial ecology
