= Industrial symbiosis =

Ability of manufacturers to share resources and reuse each other's waste

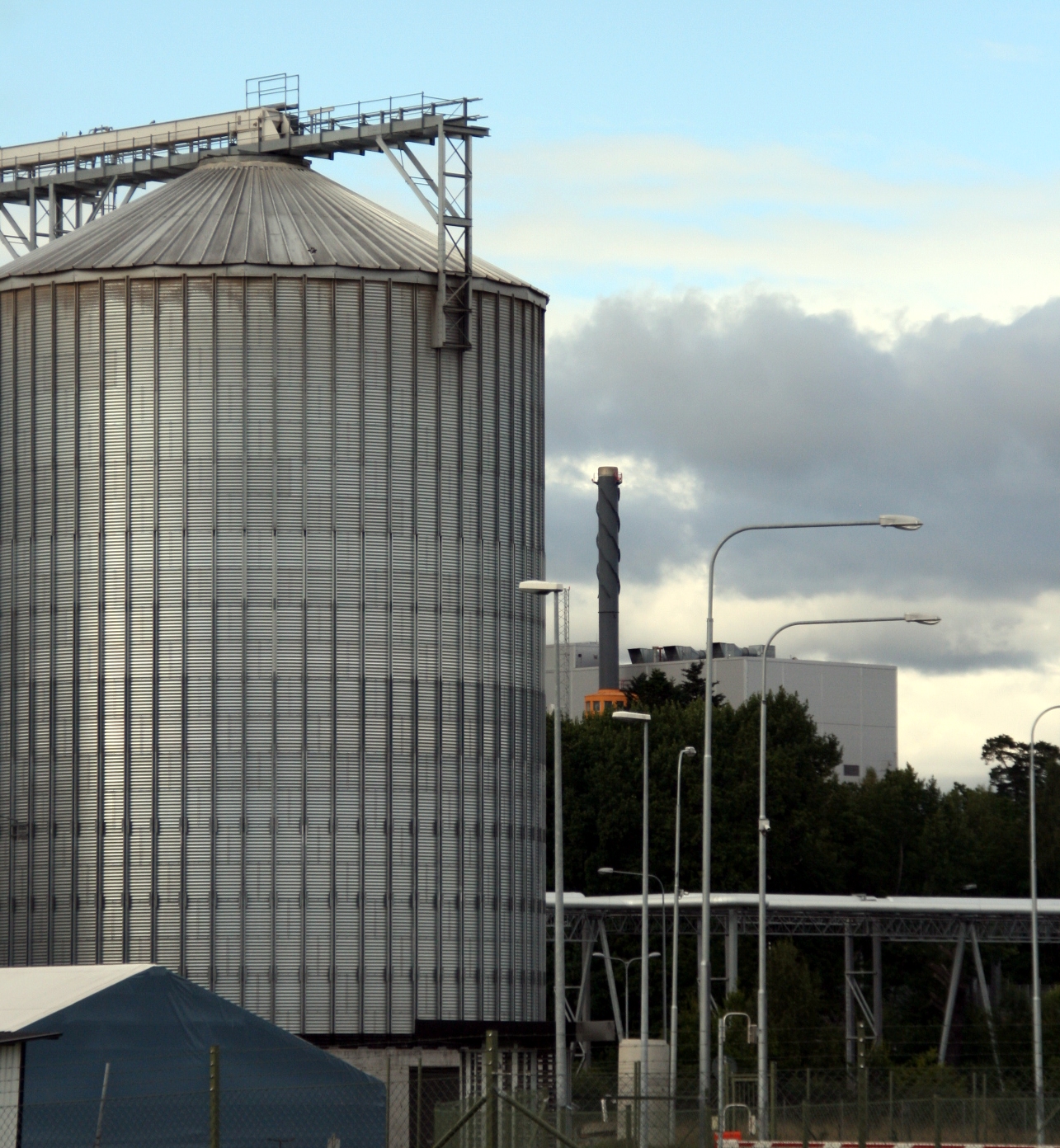
Example of Industrial symbiosis: waste steam from a waste incinerator (right) is piped to an ethanol plant (left) where it is used as an input to their production process

Industrial symbiosis is a subset of industrial ecology. It describes how a network of diverse organizations can foster eco-innovation and long-term culture change, create and share mutually profitable transactions—and improve business and technical processes.

Although geographic proximity is often associated with industrial symbiosis, it is neither necessary nor sufficient—nor is a singular focus on physical resource exchange. Strategic planning is required to optimize the synergies of co-location. In practice, using industrial symbiosis as an approach to commercial operations—using, recovering and redirecting resources for reuse—results in resources remaining in productive use in the economy for longer. This in turn creates business opportunities, reduces demands on the earth's resources, and provides a stepping-stone towards creating a circular economy.

Industrial symbiosis is a subset of industrial ecology, with a particular focus on material and energy exchange. Industrial ecology is a relatively new field that is based on a natural paradigm, claiming that an industrial ecosystem may behave in a similar way to the natural ecosystem wherein everything gets recycled, albeit the simplicity and applicability of this paradigm has been questioned.

== Introduction ==
Eco-industrial development is one of the ways in which industrial ecology contributes to the integration of economic growth and environmental protection. Some of the examples of eco-industrial development are:

- Circular economy (single material and/or energy exchange)
- Greenfield eco-industrial development (geographically confined space)
- Brownfield eco-industrial development (geographically confined space)
- Eco-industrial network (no strict requirement of geographical proximity)
- Virtual eco-industrial network (networks spread in large areas e.g. regional network)
- Networked Eco-industrial System (macro level developments with links across regions)

Industrial symbiosis engages traditionally separate industries in a collective approach to competitive advantage involving physical exchange of materials, energy, water, and/or by-products. The keys to industrial symbiosis are collaboration and the synergistic possibilities offered by geographic proximity". Notably, this definition and the stated key aspects of industrial symbiosis, i.e., the role of collaboration and geographic proximity, in its variety of forms, has been explored and empirically tested in the UK through the research and published activities of the National Industrial Symbiosis Programme.

Industrial symbiosis systems collectively optimize material and energy use at efficiencies beyond those achievable by any individual process alone. IS systems such as the web of materials and energy exchanges among companies in Kalundborg, Denmark have spontaneously evolved from a series of micro innovations over a long time scale; however, the engineered design and implementation of such systems from a macro planner's perspective, on a relatively short time scale, proves challenging.

Often, access to information on available by-products is difficult to obtain. These by-products are considered waste and typically not traded or listed on any type of exchange. Only a small group of specialized waste marketplaces addresses this particular kind of waste trading.

== Example ==
Recent work reviewed government policies necessary to construct a multi-gigaWatt photovoltaic factory and complementary policies to protect existing solar companies are outlined and the technical requirements for a symbiotic industrial system are explored to increase the manufacturing efficiency while improving the environmental impact of solar photovoltaic cells. The results of the analysis show that an eight-factory industrial symbiotic system can be viewed as a medium-term investment by any government, which will not only obtain direct financial return, but also an improved global environment. This is because synergies have been identified for co-locating glass manufacturing and photovoltaic manufacturing.

The waste heat from glass manufacturing can be used in industrial-sized greenhouses for food production. Even within the PV plant itself a secondary chemical recycling plant can reduce environmental impact while improving economic performance for the group of manufacturing facilities.

In DCM Shriram consolidated limited (Kota unit) produces caustic soda, calcium carbide, cement and PVC resins. Chlorine and hydrogen are obtained as by-products from caustic soda production, while calcium carbide produced is partly sold and partly is treated with water to form slurry(aqueous solution of calcium hydroxide) and ethylene. The chlorine and ethylene produced are utilised to form PVC compounds, while the slurry is consumed for cement production by wet process. Hydrochloric acid is prepared by direct synthesis where the pure chlorine gas can be combined with hydrogen to produce hydrogen chloride in the presence of UV light.

== See also ==
- Eco-industrial park
- Industrial ecology
- Industrial metabolism
- Waste valorization
