= Eco Park (stadium) =

Proposed stadium in Gloucestershire, England

- Interactive map of Eco Park
- Address: Eastington, Stroud, Gloucestershire; England
- Coordinates: 51.7594°N 2.3193156°W
- Capacity: 5,000

Construction
- Architect: Zaha Hadid Architects

Tenant
- Forest Green Rovers

Website
- www.ecopark.com

Eco Park is a proposed stadium in Gloucestershire, England. If constructed, the stadium will be the home ground of Forest Green Rovers.

Architects, Zaha Hadid Architects were chosen in November 2016 following a design competition.

The stadium was granted planning permission by Stroud District Council in December 2019 following amendments having initially been rejected in June 2019. It was approved in December 2019 and the green energy company Ecotricity revealed the revised plans in January 2022.

The Eco Park stadium is estimated to cost £100m and does not yet have a target for completion.

== Sustainability characteristics ==
The stadium will have the lowest carbon footprint of any football stadium in the world. It will only use renewable energy from the wind and the sun generated by Ecotricity and generate over 80% of its energy on site.
