= EcoPark (Hong Kong) =

Coordinates: 22°22′00.2″N 113°55′38.01″E

EcoPark (Chinese: 環保園) located in Tuen Mun Area 38, on west side of Hong Kong, is similar to an industrial park exclusively for waste recycling and environmental engineering. This is the first of its kind in Hong Kong.

== Introduction ==
In December 2003, the Hong Kong Government mapped out a strategy on waste management emphasized waste reduction and recovery. Hong Kong currently recycles 48% of its municipal solid waste (MSW), but over 99% of recovered recyclable materials are exported to Mainland China for further re-processing while less than 1% are treated locally and re-manufactured into useful products. With the measures to promote waste recovery, recycling and reuse in place, a local waste management area like EcoPark is a viable option for furthering Hong Kong's recycling program.

EcoPark aims to promote the local recycling industry and jump-start a circular economy to provide a sustainable solution to the city's waste problems. By encouraging and promoting the reuse, recovery and recycling of waste resources and returning them to the consumption loop, the EcoPark will help realize the full potential of the local recycling industry and alleviate the heavy reliance on the export of recyclable materials recovered from Hong Kong.

== Design and construction ==
The EcoPark occupies 200,000 square metres of land in Tuen Mun Area 38 and will be developed in two phases. As pledged in the Policy Framework, the aim is to commission Phase I of EcoPark (80,000 square metres) towards the end of 2006 and Phase II (120,000 square metres) in 2009. Hong Kong Government funding will be used to build the basic infrastructure of EcoPark.

The EcoPark will be divided into lots of different sizes. Lots in EcoPark will be tendered for specific recovered materials and processes that help achieve Hong Kong's government waste management objectives, in particular, in recycling local wastes. Admission criteria will be developed with priority given to processes involving value-added technologies, and target materials of the proposed Producer Responsibility Schemes.

== Progress ==
All six lots in EcoPark Phase I has been allocated for recycling of waste cooking oil, waste computer equipment, waste metals, waste wood, waste plastics and waste car batteries. Some of them are already in operation, while the rest of tenants will start their operation shortly.

Construction works of the EcoPark Phase II have already completed. Two lots have been allocated to non-government organisations for recycling of plastics and waste electrical appliances. The remaining lots in EcoPark Phase II will be available for tendering in late 2010.

== Phase I tenants ==
Champway Technology Limited - Recycling of waste cooking oil into biodiesel
Li Tong Group - Recycling of waste computer equipment
Shiu Wing Steel Limited - Recycling of waste metals
Hong Kong Hung Wai Wooden Board Company - Recycling of waste wood
Hong Kong Telford Envirotech Company Limited - Recycling of waste plastics
Cosmos Star Company Limited - Recycling of car batteries

== Phase II lots ==
Tendering of Phase II lots (with a total area of 100,000 square metres) will start in late 2010. Further information on the tendering can be obtained from EcoPark management office.

== Visitor Centre ==
The 1,000-square metre EcoPark Visitor Centre is the first education centre in Hong Kong with a main theme of solid waste management. Admission is free and docent service will be provided. Online and telephone booking can be arranged through the EcoPark Management Office.

== Public consultation ==
Hong Kong Government has consulted the Tuen Mun District Council and members support the development of EcoPark and agree that EcoPark will help promote development of local recycling industry and create job opportunities in Tuen Mun. The Council hopes that EcoPark will become a landmark for Tuen Mun.

Local trade associations and recyclers were also consulted and they support the development of EcoPark, agreeing that by providing long-term land at affordable cost, together with supporting infrastructure, EcoPark will help enhance recycling technology development and improve waste recovery rates in Hong Kong.

== Environmental considerations ==
An Environmental Impact Assessment (EIA) was carried out in respect of air and water quality, waste management, land contamination, landfill gas hazard and hazard to life, in which a wide range of recycling processes for different material types were examined. The assessment recommends a list of materials and processes to be allowed and also recommends a number of mitigation measures. With these measures in place, the EIA concludes that there will be no significant environmental impacts to the surrounding areas.
