= Environmentally extended input–output analysis =

Environmentally extended input–output analysis (EEIOA) is used in environmental accounting as a tool which reflects production and consumption structures within one or several economies. As such, it is becoming an important addition to material flow accounting.

== Introduction ==
In recognition of the increasing importance of global resource use mediated by international trade for environmental accounting and policy, new perspectives have been and are currently being developed within environmental accounting. The most prominent among these are consumption-based accounts compiled using environmentally extended input-output analysis. Consumption-based indicators of material use are commonly referred to as “material footprints” (comparable to carbon footprints and water footprints) or as raw material equivalents (RME) for imported and exported goods. Raw material equivalents or material footprints of traded goods comprise the material inputs required along the entire supply chain associated with their production. This includes both direct and indirect flows: For example, the ore mined to extract the metal contained in a mobile phone as well as the coal needed to generate the electricity needed to produce the metal concentrates would be included. In order to allocate domestic extraction to exported goods, information on the production and trade structure of an economy is required. In monetary terms, information on the production structure is contained in commonly available economy-wide input-output tables (IOT) which recently have been combined with trade statistics to form multi-regional IO (MRIO) tables.

== Input-output analysis ==
In the following, a short introduction to input-output analysis and its environmental extension for the calculation of material footprints or RME indicators is provided. The inter-industry flows within an economy form an n×n matrix Z and the total output of each industry forms an n×1 vector x. By dividing each flow into an industry (i.e., each element of Z) by the total output of that same industry, we obtain an n×n matrix of so-called technical coefficients A. In matrix algebra, this reads as follows:

$A = Z \times \hat{x}^{-1}$

where:

$\hat{x}$ represents the vector x diagonalized into a matrix ($\hat{x} = I\vec{x}$)

Matrix A contains the multipliers for the inter-industry inputs required to supply one unit of industry output. A certain total economic output x is required to satisfy a given level of final demand y. This final demand may be domestic (for private households as well as the public sector) or foreign (exports) and can be written as an n×1 vector. When this vector of final demand y is multiplied by the Leontief inverse (I−A)^{−1}, we obtain total output x (Note: The existence and positivity (none of its elements is negative) of this inverse matrix are not trivial. The matrix $A$ must be positive and satisfy the Hawkins-Simon condition.). I is the identity matrix so that the following matrix equation is the result of equivalence operations in our previous equation:

$\vec x = \left ( I - A \right )^{-1} \times \vec y$

1

The Leontief inverse contains the multipliers for the direct and indirect inter-industry inputs required to provide 1 unit of output to final demand. Next to the inter-industry flows recorded in Z, each industry requires additional inputs (e.g. energy, materials, capital, labour) and outputs (e.g. emissions) which can be introduced into the calculation with the help of an environmental extension. This commonly takes the shape of an m×n matrix M of total factor inputs or outputs: Factors are denoted in a total of m rows and the industries by which they are required are included along n columns. Allocation of factors to the different industries in the compilation of the extension matrix requires a careful review of industry statistics and national emissions inventories. In case of lacking data, expert opinions or additional modelling may be required to estimate the extension. Once completed, M can be transformed into a direct factor requirements matrix per unit of useful output F, and the calculation is analogous to determination of the monetary direct multipliers matrix A (see first equation):

$F = M \times \hat x ^{-1}$

Consumption-based accounting of resource use and emissions can be performed by post-multiplying the monetary input-output relation by the industry-specific factor requirements:

$E = F(I-A)^{-1} \times \vec y$

2

This formula is the core of environmentally extended input-output analysis: The final demand vector y can be split up into a domestic and a foreign (exports) component, which makes it possible to calculate the material inputs associated with each.

The matrix F integrates material (factor) flow data into input-output analysis. It allows us to allocate economy-wide material (factor) requirements to specific industries. In the language of life-cycle assessment, the matrix F is called the intervention matrix. With the help of the coefficients contained in the Leontief inverse (I−A)^{−1}, the material requirements can be allocated to domestic or foreign (exports) final demand. In order to consider variations in production structures across different economies or regions, national input-output tables are combined to form so-called multi-regional input-output (MRIO) models. In these models, the sum total of resources allocated to final consumption equals the sum total of resources extracted, as recorded in the material flow accounts for each of the regions.

== Critical issues ==
Environmentally extended input–output analysis comes with a number of assumptions which have to be kept in mind when interpreting the results of such studies:

Homogeneity of products: Calculations based on the standard IO model make it necessary to assume that each economic activity produces only one physically homogeneous product. In reality, however, the high level of aggregation of activities (e.g., in most European IO tables, all mining is included in the same activity irrespective of the specific material) leads to inhomogeneous outputs. In addition, many industries generate by-products (e.g., a paper mill may also produce saw dust); and this additionally violates the assumption of homogeneity of outputs. Along the same lines, when this method is used to ascribe environmental impacts, not all the products in a given sector have the same emissions. An average is used. But for instance in terms of power generation, the emissions from coal based power generation are very different from those of solar power generation. An assumption is made here that the global mixture is being used, when actually power generation may be available only from one source.

Homogeneity of prices: In using the standard IO model, it is also necessary to assume that each industry sells its characteristic output to all other economic activities and to final consumers at the same price. In reality, however, this is not always true as illustrated by the example of electricity which costs less in the primary than in the tertiary sectors and/or final consumption. In addition, the aforementioned heterogeneity of industry output will cause this assumption to be violated: For example, a sector buying mostly aluminum from the non-ferrous metal industries is likely to pay a different price than a sector that mostly buys rare earth metals. In other words, the issue of price heterogeneity among users can be coped with by increasing the sector resolution of the input-output table. Under an ideal condition when the same price of a product applies to all its users, the monetary input-output table can be regarded as equavalent to a physical input-output table, that is, a table measured in physical units.

Constant Returns to Scale: IO models assume that when production is scaled, all the inputs and outputs scale by the same factor. However, it is imperative to acknowledge that deviating from this simplifying assumption greatly increases the complexity of IO models, thereby diminishing their primary analytical efficacy: A closed solution as equation (1) will no longer be available. Furthermore, acquiring dependable data pertaining to input-output relationships at the macroeconomic level, encompassing a large number of sectors, poses formidable challenges and substantial financial burdens. This foundational assumption also underpins life-cycle assessment (LCA).

Allocation of investments: In creating a consumption-based account of material flows, it is necessary to decide how investments are allocated within the production and consumption structure. In national accounting, investments are reported as part of final demand. From a consumption-based perspective, they can also be thought of as an input into the production process (e.g., machinery and production infrastructure are necessary inputs to production). The manner in which capital investments are included and how (or if) they are depreciated, significantly impacts the results obtained for the raw material equivalents of exports. If infrastructure investments (whether in monetary terms or as domestic extraction of construction materials) are not depreciated over time, importing one and the same product from an emerging economy currently building up its infrastructure will be associated with much more embodied material than importing it from a mature economy which has significantly invested into its infrastructure in the past. For recent developments regarding the treatment of issues related to capital stock and investment flows, please refer to (Section 4.4).

Understanding the impact and eventually resolving these methodological issues will become important items on the environmental accounting research agenda. At the same time, interest is already growing in the interpretability of the results of such consumption-based approaches. It has yet to be determined how responsibility for material investments into the production of exports should be shared in general: While it is true that the importing economy receives the benefit of the ready-made product, it is also true that the exporting economy receives the benefit of income.

== Further extensions ==
=== Avoiding double counting in footprint analysis ===
Let's define $y_j$ as a vector of the same size as $y$, where all elements are zero except for the $j$-th one. From (2), the environmental footprint of product $j$ can be given by

$F(I-A)^{-1}y_j$

Applying this calculation to materials such as metals and basic chemicals requires caution because only a small portion of them will be consumed by final demand. Conversely, using the model based on gross output, $x_j$, as

$F(I-A)^{-1}x_j$

would result in the double-counting of emissions at each processing stage, leading to incorrect total environmental impacts (here, $x_j$ represents a column vector of the size as $y$ with all elements equal to zero except for the $j$-th one). To address this problem, Dente et al. developed an innovative method based on the concept of "target sectors", which was further elaborated by Cabernard et al.

=== Distributing environmental responsibility ===
Footprint calculation based on (2) completely allocates the environmental impacts to the final consumers. This is called Consumer-based responsibility. An alternative way of allocation is one based on direct impacts, $Fx_j$, where the impacts are allocated to the producers. This is called Production-based responsibility. These are examples of the full responsibility approach, where the impacts/pressures are allocated completely to a particular group or agents. Recently, several hybrid allocation schems have been proposed, including Income-based ones and Sharedness.

=== Waste and waste management ===
When the intervention matrix $F$ refers to waste, (2) could be used to assess the waste-footprint of products. However, it overlooks the crucial point that waste typically undergoes treatment before recycling or final disposal, leading to a form less harmful to the environment. Additionally, the treatment of emissions results in residues that require proper handling for recycling or final disposal (for instance, the pollution abatement process of sulfur dioxide involves its conversion into gypsum or sulfuric acid). To address these complexities, Nakamura and Kondo extended the standard EEIO model by incorporating physical waste flows generated and treated alongside monetary flows of products and services. They developed the Waste Input-Output (WIO) model, which accounts for the transformation of waste during treatment into secondary waste and residues, as well as recycling and final disposal processes.

== See also ==
- Anthropogenic metabolism
- Environmental accounting
- Environmental Accounts
- Embedded emissions
- Greenhouse gas emissions accounting
- Industrial metabolism
- Input-output model
- Material flow accounting
- Material flow analysis
- Social metabolism
- Urban metabolism
- Wassily Leontief
- Waste input-output model
