= Shinichiro Nakamura (disambiguation) =

Shinichiro Nakamura may refer to:

- Shin'ichirō Nakamura, Japanese author
- Shinichiro Nakamura (economist), Japanese economist and industrial ecologist
