= Avoided burden =

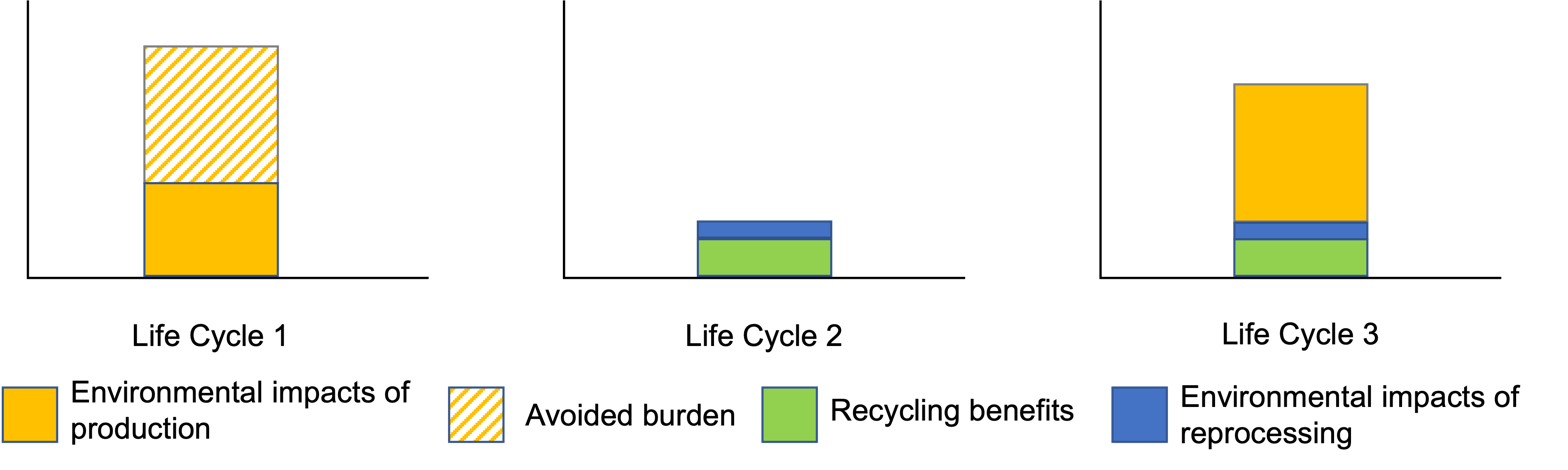
An illustration of the allocation of avoided burden and recycling benefits across life cycles.

Avoided burden (also known as the 0:100 method or end-of-life method) is an allocation approach used in life-cycle assessment (LCA) to assess the environmental impacts of recycled and reused materials, components, products, or buildings. While the approach has been adapted to fit a variety of LCA goals, it generally considers products with recycling or reuse potential and allocates the environmental impacts of their initial production to their final life cycle. The avoided burden method is never explicitly required for LCA under the International Organization for Standardization (ISO) or European Standards (EN). In fact, these organizations only require that an allocation approach be used to properly address reuse and recycling. In this case, LCA practitioners can choose to utilize the avoided burden method based on the goal and scope of their study.

== Purpose ==
The avoided burden approach, along with other allocation methods, exists to address the gap between product life cycles as well as to prevent the "double-counting" of certain benefits or harms that result from reusing or recycling a product. Such procedure is required under ISO 14044 as it requires the use of an allocation method to account for the reuse and recycling of previously adopted materials. A LCA practitioner's selection of an allocation approach depends on the goal of the LCA study, as each approach is distinct and yields unique results.

== Origin ==
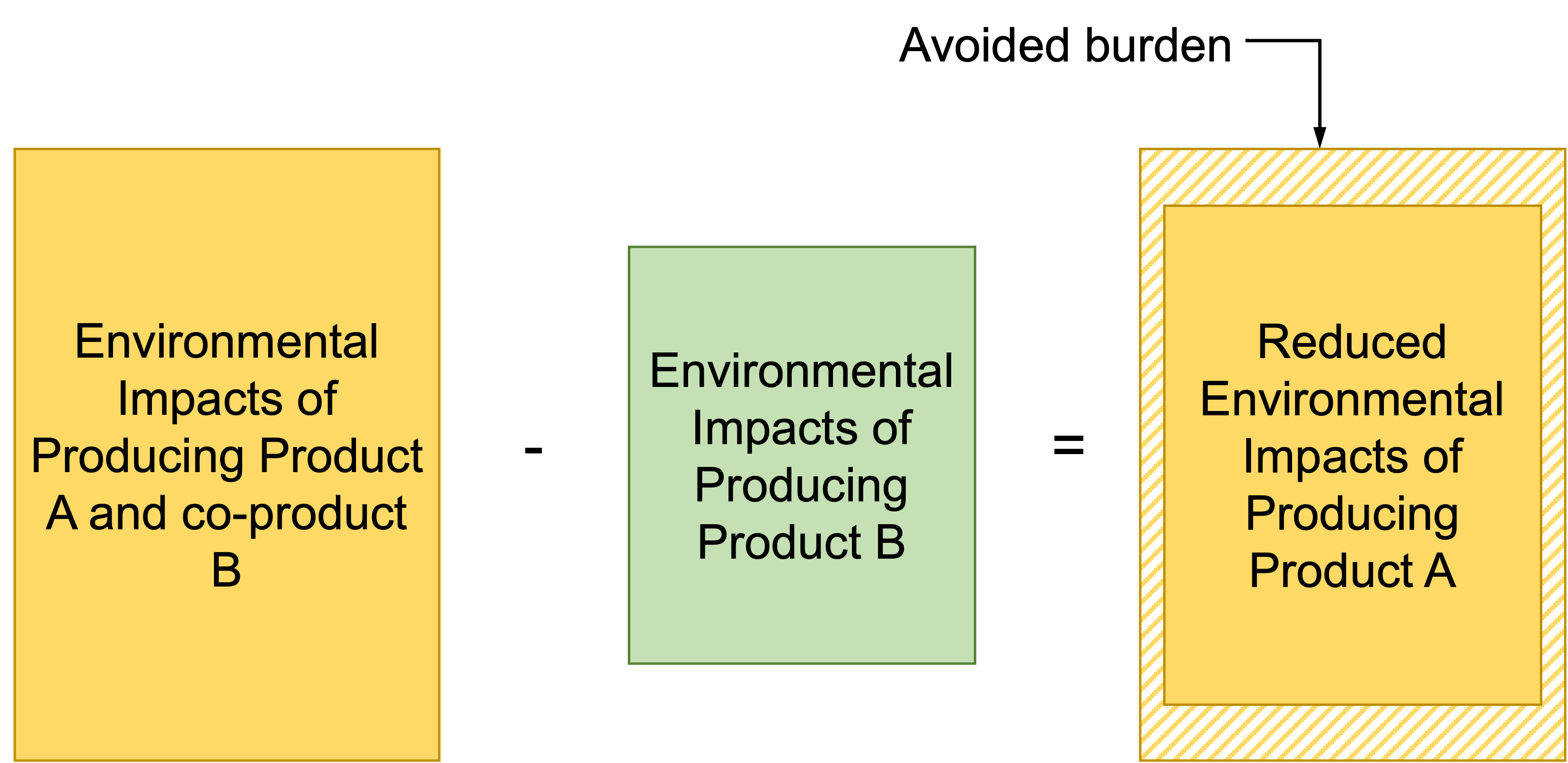
An illustration of avoided burden in a multi-functional production process. This can be used to compare the environmental impacts of a similar product with no co-products.

The avoided burden method was derived from the system expansion procedure outlined in ISO 14044 for LCA. System expansion acknowledges that most production processes result in the generation of co-products. For instance, a corn mill not only produces corn, but corn oil as well. Under the system expansion procedure, these co-products remain in a product's expanded system boundary, and must therefore also be analyzed. Such method enables LCA practitioners to compare the impacts of multi-function production processes with the impacts of multiple single-function processes that generate the same output. As a result, the functional unit assessed in an LCA study is broadened. The avoided burden method narrows down this functional unit while also accounting for the benefits of co-production. This is accomplished by subtracting the environmental impacts of producing only the co-product from the environmental impacts of producing the main product (and its co-products). This type of avoided burden simplifies the comparison of different production processes. It is a common approach in the assessment of agricultural processes.

== Application ==
=== End of Life Recycling ===
Avoided burden can also be used, and is most often used, in the context of recycling. In this setting, it is also known as the end of life recycling approach. Here, the environmental consequences between product systems are weighed and the benefits of recycling are credited to a product's first life cycle. These benefits are equivalent to the environmental impacts that would have otherwise resulted from processing additional virgin materials. For instance, PET bottles may be given environmental credit for the PET they contain since the material will eventually be recycled back into further PET products. A product's subsequent life cycles include the environmental impacts generated from collecting, preparing, and reprocessing the product for each future use. In this case, the avoided burden method takes the environmental impacts generated from manufacturing a recyclable product with virgin materials and transfers them to the product's final life cycle. As a result, the first life cycle of a product can have negative environmental impacts. The avoided burden approach is most prominent in the metal industry. In fact, the metal industry endorsed this procedure in 2006 as its primary environmental modeling method. This is because the manufacturing of metals, such as aluminum and steel, have relatively high environmental impacts that can be offset by implementing the avoided burden approach in a cradle-to-grave LCA. This reduction is possible due to both the feasibility of recycling metals and the consistency of material properties between virgin and recycled metals. For this reason, the aluminum can industry, for example, relies on the avoided burden method to illustrate the benefits of production. Aluminum production, which generates substantial emissions, is an energy intensive process since it consumes a vast amount of resources. Recycling aluminum avoids the environmental costs of primary production. Under the avoided burden method, these avoided costs are subtracted from the cycle in which the can is first produced. These impacts can be considerable, as aluminum cans are about 70% recycled in the US, on average, and are "infinitely recyclable." The same applies for scrap metal produced in metal manufacturing. If more scrap is generated during a product's use than is needed for manufacturing, the product earns a credit equivalent to the difference between the impacts of production and the impacts of reprocessing the secondary material. Avoided burden therefore communicates whether a product with high recycling potential is environmentally advantageous. In terms of ISO 14044, this method is often preferred to other allocation approaches due to its roots in system expansion and its closed-loop nature.

=== Limitations ===
Avoided burden is implemented in LCA where appropriate, as its results could significantly impact the outcome of a study. Users of the avoided burden approach have praised this method for showing the value of existing materials. However, it is most useful when evaluating products with high recycling or reuse potential and high environmental impacts. In the case of products with low environmental impacts, ineffective recycling, and infrequent recycling, such as wood and plastics, the approach is less critical as it yields less indicative information.

The avoided burden procedure operates under certain assumptions. For instance, the method assumes that the product or material assessed will be used at least twice, and that the product or material will still be in demand in the future, which could range anywhere between days to years depending on the product at hand. While this may encourage designers to plan for future reuse, it also introduces a risk element to the LCA. In the case the product is not recycled or reused as expected, it may fail to repay the "environmental loan" it borrowed at the time of its first LCA. In this situation, the actual recycling and reuse benefits would differ from the expected benefits, and could diverge from the intended results of the initial design and production decisions. The method also assumes recycling rates. Recycling rates are variable measures that depend on consumption and capture, imports and exports, recycling yields, etc. As a result, they may be difficult to accurately predict. Metal associations often publish their recycling rates in their LCAs or in similar documentation. Other products, on the other hand, are less thorough, which results in challenges for LCA practitioners.

=== Calculation ===
The calculation of avoided burden varies by type, LCA scope and goal, and LCA practitioner. Although its calculation is not without some degree of subjectivity, the avoided burden in the end of life recycling approach is usually calculated as follows:

Avoided Burden = (Material Recycling Rate) × (Functional Unit) × [(Impact of Virgin Production) − (Impact of Recycling)]

== Building Refurbishment ==
=== Application ===
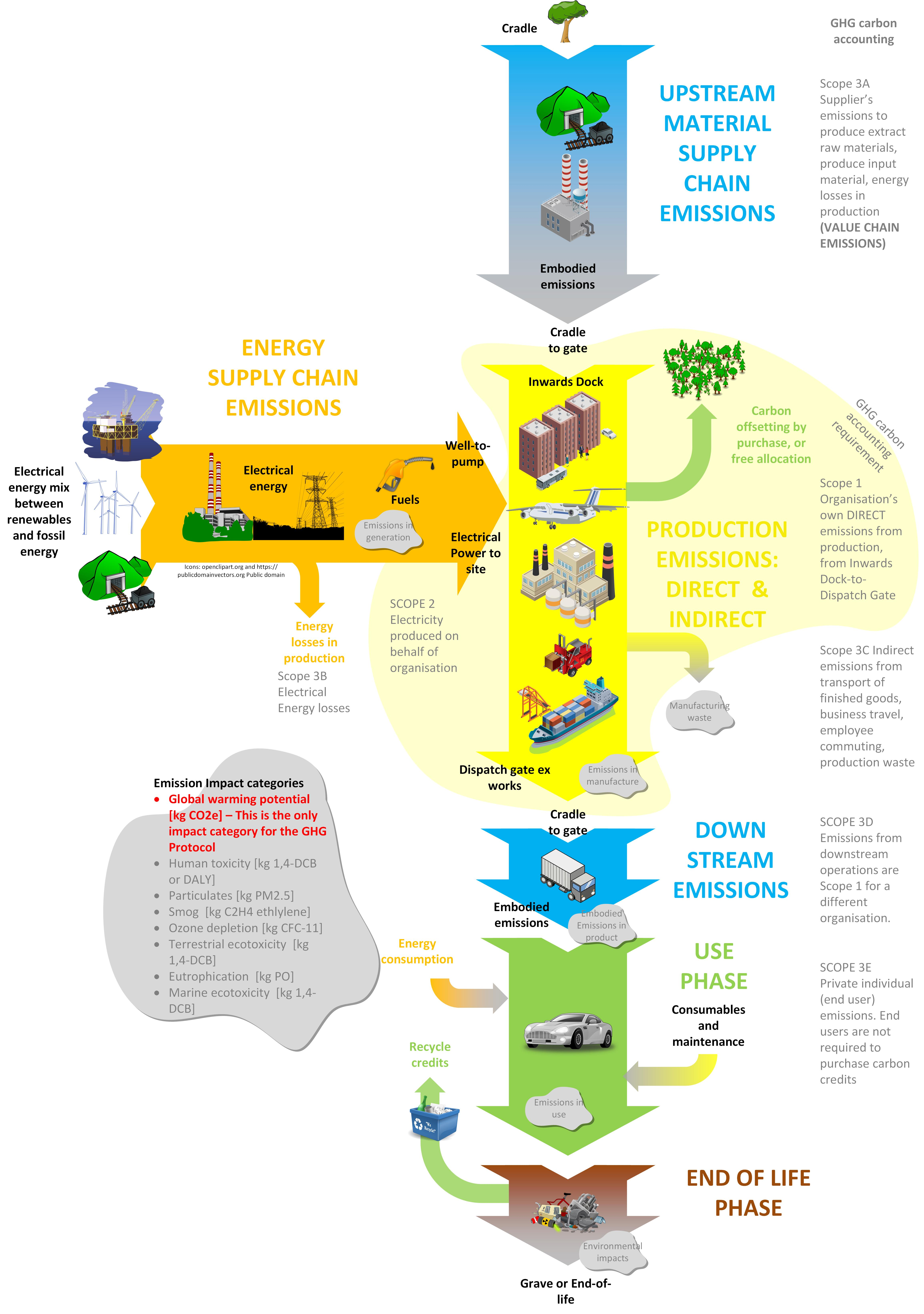
An illustration of life cycle stages. In many cases, building refurbishment is categorized as new life cycle rather than an extension of the use stage (green).

Avoided burden is implemented differently in building refurbishment than in products. In LCA, building refurbishment is often treated as the beginning of a new life cycle as opposed to a continuation of the "use stage" due to the significant environmental impacts incurred by the production of most building products and its exclusion from previous assessments, per EN 15978. Building refurbishment may include repair, such as that of a steel frame, or upgrades, such as that of the facade. In this case, ISO 14044 still applies, resulting in a need for an allocation approach to consider the flow between "previous and new life cycles". Similar to the end of life recycling approach, virtually all of the environmental impacts from the production phase are assigned to the building's second use. However, unlike the end of life recycling approach, the benefits of using the recycled materials are not considered, only their creation. This curates a more accurate depiction of the value of existing materials in refurbishment projects.

=== Research and Limitations ===
The avoided burden method in building reuse assumes that certain building materials and components will be used beyond their first life cycle. Much like with products, this encourages engineers and architects to plan for future use. However, this future use can be challenging to predict due to the longer lifetime of buildings. Avoided burden also requires more work from the LCA practitioner to develop an accurate representation of the existing building in order to yield reliable results. Rarely do refurbishment projects require a detailed mapping of the existing structure. However, an expansive bill of materials is required for an accurate LCA, which could result in increased consultancy costs.

Similar to product LCA, there several methods an LCA practitioner can use to assess the environmental benefits and burdens of refurbishment and reuse. Most include drawbacks such as a neglect of remaining materials in a building or an inability to accommodate for past benefits. For this reason, researchers are developing methods that remedy these issues.

== Implementation in Other Allocation Approaches ==
Other allocation approaches have built off the avoided burden framework to evaluate the benefits and burdens of recycling and reuse across multiple product life cycles. These approaches include, but are not limited to, the 50:50 approach and the Product Environmental Footprint (PEF) approach.

=== 50:50 Approach ===
The 50:50 approach, or 50:50 rule, was first proposed in 1994. It is considered a compromise between the avoided burden approach and the cut-off approach, an approach that attributes the environmental impacts of each life cycle stage to the life cycle in which it occurs. The 50:50 approach evenly distributes the benefits and burdens of using recycled materials to a product's first and second life cycles. More specifically, 50% of the environmental impacts of production are allocated to the first life cycle while the second life cycle is allocated the remaining 50% as well as the impacts from reprocessing. Despite the benefits that stem from combining the cut-off and avoided burden approaches, the 50:50 approach is not often used in practice.

=== PEF Approach ===
The PEF approach builds off the 50:50 approach as it also distributes benefits and burdens across multiple life cycles. However, it also considers the down-cycling of materials and the market demand for recycled products. In this case, the first life cycle is assigned half of the environmental impacts of production, while the second life cycle is allocated the remaining half in addition to the reprocessing impacts multiplied by a quality factor. In doing so, the PEF approach accounts for a presumably circular economy. This is the greatest strength of the PEF approach, and for this reason, it is expected to prevail in the future. Currently, however, LCA practitioners face difficulties using this method due to a lack of data to approximate quality factors. This information is important to LCA practitioners, as it can often tip the balance between two compared alternative products or materials.
