= Hawkins–Simon condition =

Result in mathematical economics

The Hawkins–Simon condition refers to a result in mathematical economics, attributed to David Hawkins and Herbert A. Simon, that guarantees the existence of a non-negative output vector that solves the equilibrium relation in the input–output model where demand equals supply. More precisely, it states a condition for $[\mathbf{I} - \mathbf{A}]$ under which the input–output system

$$[\mathbf{I} - \mathbf{A}] \cdot \mathbf{x} = \mathbf{d}$$

has a solution $\mathbf{\hat{x}} \geq 0$ for any $\mathbf{d} \geq 0$. Here $\mathbf{I}$ is the identity matrix and $\mathbf{A}$ is called the input–output matrix or Leontief matrix after Wassily Leontief, who empirically estimated it in the 1940s. Together, they describe a system in which

$$\sum_{j=1}^{n} a_{ij} x_{j} + d_{i} = x_{i} \quad i = 1, 2, \ldots, n$$

where $a_{ij}$ is the amount of the ith good used to produce one unit of the jth good, $x_{j}$ is the amount of the jth good produced, and $d_{i}$ is the amount of final demand for good i. Rearranged and written in vector notation, this gives the first equation.

Define $[\mathbf{I} - \mathbf{A}] = \mathbf{B}$, where $\mathbf{B} = \left[ b_{ij} \right]$ is an $n \times n$ matrix with $b_{ij} \leq 0, i \neq j$. Then the Hawkins–Simon theorem states that the following two conditions are equivalent

(i) There exists an $\mathbf{x} \geq 0$ such that $\mathbf{B} \cdot \mathbf{x} > 0$.
(ii) All the successive leading principal minors of $\mathbf{B}$ are positive, that is

$$b_{11} > 0, \begin{vmatrix} b_{11} & b_{12} \\ b_{21} & b_{22} \end{vmatrix} > 0, \ldots, \begin{vmatrix} b_{11} & b_{12} & \dots & b_{1n} \\ b_{21} & b_{22} & \dots & b_{2n} \\ \vdots & \vdots & \ddots & \vdots \\ b_{n1} & b_{n2} & \dots & b_{nn} \end{vmatrix} > 0$$

For a proof, see Morishima (1964), Nikaido (1968), or Murata (1977). Condition (ii) is known as Hawkins–Simon condition. This theorem was independently discovered by David Kotelyanskiĭ, as it is referred to by Felix Gantmacher as Kotelyanskiĭ lemma.

== See also ==
- Diagonally dominant matrix
- Perron–Frobenius theorem
- Sylvester's criterion
