= Shinichiro Nakamura (economist) =

Japanese economist and industrial ecologist

- 中村 愼一郎
- Born: 1952 (age 73–74)
- Known for: Waste Input-Output analysis
- Awards: Society Prize, International Society for Industrial Ecology

Academic background
- Education: Keio University; University of Bonn

Academic work
- Discipline: Economics, Industrial ecology
- Institutions: Waseda University

Shinichiro Nakamura (Japanese: 中村 愼一郎, Hepburn: Nakamura Shin'ichirō; born 1952) is a Japanese economist and industrial ecologist, and Professor Emeritus at Waseda University. He is known for his contributions to industrial ecology, particularly for developing the Waste input-output analysis (WIO) , an extension of Input–output analysis that incorporates physical flows of waste and recycling.

== Education and career ==
Nakamura graduated from the Faculty of Economics at Keio University in 1974 and completed his master's degree there in 1978. He subsequently moved to Germany as a scholar of the German Academic Exchange Service (DAAD) and continued his education at the University of Bonn, where he earned a doctorate in economics (Dr. rer. pol.) in 1983. His doctoral research focused on multi-sectoral econometric modeling.

After serving as a research associate at the Special Research Unit (SFB) 21/301 established by the German Research Foundation at the University of Bonn, he returned to Japan in 1985 to join the Faculty of Political Science and Economics at Waseda University. He became a full professor in 1992 and remained at Waseda University until his retirement in 2022. He also held visiting academic appointments as Associate Professor at the University of Toronto (1988–1990), as Guest Professor at Nagoya University (2005–2012), and as Visiting Fellow at the LMU Munich Center for Advanced Studies (2012).

From 2010 to 2018, Nakamura served as Chair of the Ministry of the Environment's Study Committee on the Compilation of Environmentally Extended Input–Output Tables., where he was involved in the development of input–output statistics in the environmental field. He was also one of the founding editors of the academic journal Structural Change and Economic Dynamics (published by Elsevier). In addition, from 2011 to 2017, he participated in the joint management of the Erasmus Mundus master's programme Industrial Ecology (MIND).

== Research ==
Nakamura's research is grounded in the theory and applications of input–output analysis and focuses on the development of methods for analyzing environmental burdens, resource circulation, and waste management.

The Waste Input–Output (WIO) analysis, developed beginning in the late 1990s, incorporates flows of waste generation, treatment, and recycling into conventional input–output tables. The approach has been applied as a framework for quantitative policy evaluation in the context of a circular economy.

These contributions have influenced research in life cycle assessment (LCA) and material flow analysis (MFA) and were recognized with the Society Prize of the International Society for Industrial Ecology.

== Awards and honors ==
- 1983 – GEFFRUB Prize for Best Doctoral Thesis, University of Bonn
- 2006 – Honda Award for Recycling Technology, Japan Environmental Management Association for Industry
- 2012 – JLCA Award, Life Cycle Assessment Society of Japan
- 2012 – Asada Prize, Iron and Steel Institute of Japan
- 2021 – Society Prize, International Society for Industrial Ecology

== Selected works ==
=== Books ===
- Nakamura, Shinichiro (2023). A Practical Guide to Industrial Ecology by Input–Output Analysis. Springer. doi:10.1007/978-3-031-43684-0.

=== Peer-reviewed articles ===
- Nakamura, S.; Kondo, Y. (2002). "Input–output analysis of waste management". Journal of Industrial Ecology, 6(1), 39–63. doi:10.1162/108819802320971632
- Nakamura, S.; Kondo, Y. (2006). "A waste input–output life-cycle cost analysis of the recycling of end-of-life electrical home appliances". Ecological Economics, 57(3), 494–506. doi:10.1016/j.ecolecon.2005.05.002
- Nakamura, S.; Nakajima, K.; Kondo, Y.; Nagasaka, T. (2007). "The Waste Input–Output Approach to Material Flow Analysis". Journal of Industrial Ecology, 11(4), 50–63. doi:10.1162/jiec.2007.1290
- Nakamura, S. et al. (2014). "MaTrace: Tracing the Fate of Materials over Time and Across Products in Open-Loop Recycling". Environmental Science & Technology, 48(13), 7207–7214. doi:10.1021/es500820h
- Nakamura, S. et al. (2017). "Quantifying Recycling and Losses of Cr and Ni in Steel Throughout Multiple Life Cycles Using MaTrace-Alloy". Environmental Science & Technology, 51(17), 9469–9476. doi:10.1021/acs.est.7b01683
