= Input–output model =

Quantitative economic model

In economics, an input–output model is a quantitative economic model that represents the interdependencies between different sectors of a national economy or different regional economies. They are based on are formalized as industry-by-industry or product-by-product Matrices, where rows typically represent outputs from one sector to another, and columns represent inputs. These models are often used by national statistics offices for their system of national accounts, including the quantification of Gross domestic product. Furthermore, they have been used increasingly in recent years to quantify Environmental footprints, enabling a consumption-based accounting of environmental impacts. Because they are linear in nature, computing input-output models is computationally cheap. However, they require large amounts of data and are therefore often subject to delays and sometimes uncertainties. Wassily Leontief (1906–1999) is credited with developing this type of analysis and was awarded the Nobel Prize in Economics for his development of this model.

== Origins ==
Francois Quesnay had developed a cruder version of this technique called Tableau économique, and Léon Walras's work Elements of Pure Economics on general equilibrium theory also was a forerunner and made a generalization of Leontief's seminal concept.

Alexander Bogdanov has been credited with originating the concept in a report delivered to the All Russia Conference on the Scientific Organisation of Labour and Production Processes, in January 1921. This approach was also developed by Lev Kritzman. Thomas Remington, has argued that their work provided a link between Quesnay's tableau économique and the subsequent contributions by Vladimir Groman and Vladimir Bazarov to Gosplan's method of material balance planning.

Wassily Leontief's work in the input–output model was influenced by the works of the classical economists Karl Marx and Jean Charles Léonard de Sismondi. Marx's economics provided an early outline involving a set of tables where the economy consisted of two interlinked departments.

Leontief was the first to use a matrix representation of a national (or regional) economy.

== Basic derivation ==
The model depicts inter-industry relationships within an economy, showing how output from one industrial sector may become an input to another industrial sector. In the inter-industry matrix, column entries typically represent inputs to an industrial sector, while row entries represent outputs from a given sector. This format, therefore, shows how dependent each sector is on every other sector, both as a customer of outputs from other sectors and as a supplier of inputs. Sectors may also depend internally on a portion of their own production as delineated by the entries of the matrix diagonal. Each column of the input–output matrix shows the value of inputs to each sector and each row represents the value of each sector's outputs, typically in monetary values.

Say that we have an economy with $n$ sectors. Each sector produces $x_i$ units of a single homogeneous good. Assume that the $j$th sector, in order to produce 1 unit, must use $a_{ij}$ units from sector $i$. Furthermore, assume that each sector sells some of its output to other sectors (intermediate output) and some of its output to consumers (final output, or final demand). Call final demand in the $i$th sector $y_i$. Then we might write

$$x_i = a_{i1}x_1 + a_{i2}x_2 + \cdots + a_{in}x_n + y_i,$$

or total output equals intermediate output plus final output. If we let $A$ be the matrix of coefficients $a_{ij}$, $\mathbf x$ be the vector of total output, and $\mathbf y$ be the vector of final demand, then our expression for the economy becomes

$$\mathbf{x} = A\mathbf{x} + \mathbf{y}$$	1

which after re-writing becomes $\left(I - A\right)\mathbf{x} = \mathbf{y}$. If the matrix $I - A$ is invertible then this is a linear system of equations with a unique solution, and so given some final demand vector the required output can be found. Furthermore, if the principal minors of the matrix $I - A$ are all positive (known as the Hawkins–Simon condition), the required output vector $\mathbf x$ is non-negative.

=== Example ===
Consider an economy with two sectors, coal and steel, each of which uses both its own output and the other's as inputs to production. The technical coefficient $a_{ij}$ is the amount of good i needed to produce one unit of good j, so each column lists the inputs a sector consumes per unit of its own output:

$$A = \begin{bmatrix} 0.5 & 0.2 \\ 0.4 & 0.1 \end{bmatrix}, \qquad \mathbf{y} = \begin{bmatrix} 7 \\ 4 \end{bmatrix}.$$

Reading the columns, producing one unit of coal requires 0.5 units of coal and 0.4 units of steel, while producing one unit of steel requires 0.2 units of coal and 0.1 units of steel. The final demand $\mathbf{y}$ is the output left for consumers after all inter-industry use. Total output $\mathbf{x}$ must cover both intermediate use $A\mathbf{x}$ and final demand:

$$\mathbf{x} = A\mathbf{x} + \mathbf{y} \quad\Longrightarrow\quad (I - A)\cdot\mathbf{x} = \mathbf{y} \quad\Longrightarrow\quad \mathbf{x} = (I - A)^{-1}\mathbf{y}.$$

Forming $I - A$ gives

$$I - A = \begin{bmatrix} 0.5 & -0.2 \\ -0.4 & 0.9 \end{bmatrix},$$

with determinant

$$\det(I - A) = (0.5)(0.9) - (-0.2)(-0.4) = 0.37.$$

Inverting it yields

$$(I - A)^{-1} = \frac{1}{0.37} \begin{bmatrix} 0.9 & 0.2 \\ 0.4 & 0.5 \end{bmatrix} \approx \begin{bmatrix} 2.432 & 0.541 \\ 1.081 & 1.351 \end{bmatrix}.$$

This is the Leontief inverse. Multiplying by the final demand yields the required gross output:

$$\mathbf{x} = (I - A)^{-1}\mathbf{y} = \frac{1}{0.37} \begin{bmatrix} 0.9(7) + 0.2(4) \\ 0.4(7) + 0.5(4) \end{bmatrix} = \frac{1}{0.37} \begin{bmatrix} 7.1 \\ 4.8 \end{bmatrix} \approx \begin{bmatrix} 19.19 \\ 12.97 \end{bmatrix}.$$

The result can be checked by subtracting inter-industry consumption from gross output. The intermediate use is

$$A\mathbf{x} \approx \begin{bmatrix} 0.5(19.19) + 0.2(12.97) \\ 0.4(19.19) + 0.1(12.97) \end{bmatrix} \approx \begin{bmatrix} 12.19 \\ 8.97 \end{bmatrix},$$

so $\mathbf{x} - A\mathbf{x} \approx \mathbf{y}$, as required.

The economy must produce 19.19 units of coal to deliver only 7 to consumers. The difference is the indirect requirement: coal is needed to make steel, and to make the additional coal, and so on through successive rounds of production. The Leontief inverse sums this entire series,

$$(I - A)^{-1} = I + A + A^2 + A^3 + \cdots,$$

which converges because the economy is productive (the largest eigenvalue of $A$ is less than 1).

=== Further research ===
There is extensive literature on these models. The model has been extended to work with non-linear relationships between sectors. There is the Hawkins–Simon condition on producibility. There has been research on disaggregation to clustered inter-industry flows, and on the study of constellations of industries. A great deal of empirical work has been done to identify coefficients, and data has been published for national economies as well as for regions, some of which have global coverage. The Leontief system can be extended to a model of general equilibrium; it offers a method of decomposing work done at a macro level.

=== Regional multipliers ===
While national input–output tables are commonly created by countries' statistics agencies, officially published regional input–output tables are rare. Therefore, economists often use location quotients to create regional multipliers starting from national data. This technique has been criticized because there are several location quotient regionalization techniques, and none are universally superior across all use-cases.

=== Introducing transportation ===
Transportation is implicit in the notion of inter-industry flows. It is explicitly recognized when transportation is identified as an industry – how much is purchased from transportation in order to produce. But this is not very satisfactory because transportation requirements differ, depending on industry locations and capacity constraints on regional production. Also, the receiver of goods generally pays freight cost, and often transportation data are lost because transportation costs are treated as part of the cost of the goods.

Walter Isard and his student, Leon Moses, were quick to see the spatial economy and transportation implications of input–output, and began work in this area in the 1950s developing a concept of interregional input–output. Take a one region versus the world case. We wish to know something about inter-regional commodity flows, so introduce a column into the table headed "exports" and we introduce an "import" row.

Table: Adding Export And Import Transactions
Economic Activities	1	2	...	...	Z	Exports	Domestic Final Demand	Total Outputs
1
2
...
...
Z
Imports

A more satisfactory way to proceed would be to tie regions together at the industry level. That is, we could identify both intra-region inter-industry transactions and inter-region inter-industry transactions. The problem here is that the table grows quickly.

Input–output is conceptually simple. Its extension to a model of equilibrium in the national economy has been done successfully using high-quality data. One who wishes to work with input–output systems must deal with industry classification, data estimation, and inverting very large, often ill-conditioned matrices. The quality of the data and matrices of the input-output model can be improved by modelling activities with digital twins and solving the problem of optimizing management decisions. Moreover, changes in relative prices are not readily handled by this modelling approach alone. Input–output accounts are part and parcel to a more flexible form of modelling, computable general equilibrium models (Note: However, CGE models rely on economic production functions, such as CES functions, and are not suited to representing actual technologies in detail, whereas in IO there is no limit in resolution. Furthermore, the use of CES functions results in using a number of separability assumptions which can have strong implications on the assumed technology.).

Two additional difficulties are of interest in transportation work. There is the question of substituting one input for another, and there is the question about the stability of coefficients as production increases or decreases. These are intertwined questions. They have to do with the nature of regional production functions.

=== Technology Assumptions ===
To construct input-output tables from supply and use tables, four principal assumptions can be applied. The choice depends on whether product-by-product or industry-by-industry input-output tables are to be established.

== Usefulness and applications ==
Because the input–output model is fundamentally linear in nature, it lends itself to rapid computation as well as flexibility in computing the effects of changes in demand.

=== Environmental analyses ===
Input–output models for different regions can also be linked together to investigate the effects of inter-regional trade, and additional columns can be added to the table to perform environmentally extended input–output analysis (EEIOA). For example, information on fossil fuel inputs to each sector can be used to investigate flows of embodied carbon within and between different economies. Since most input-output models are quantified in monetary units, environmental intensities are typically expressed in damage per dollar, meaning that every dollar spent in an industry is assumed to have the same impact. This can lead to bias in the estimations, since price does not always reflect environmental damage (e.g., in Co2 or water use) well. This is the case for wine for example - while prices might differ greatly between different bottles of wine, it is unlikely that a wine that costs 200$ per bottle will have a twenty-fold effect of a bottle that only costs 10$. To circumvent this problem, physical input-output tables can be constructed. These are based on physical quantities rather than prices and are thus better suited for environmental accounting.

=== National accounts ===
The structure of the input–output model has been incorporated into national accounting in many developed countries, and as such can be used to calculate important measures such as national GDP. Input–output economics has been used to study regional economies within a nation, and as a tool for national and regional economic planning. A main use of input–output analysis is to measure the economic impacts of events as well as public investments or programs as shown by IMPLAN and Regional Input–Output Modeling System. It is also used to identify economically related industry clusters and also so-called "key" or "target" industries (industries that are most likely to enhance the internal coherence of a specified economy). By linking industrial output to satellite accounts articulating energy use, effluent production, space needs, and so on, input–output analysts have extended the approaches application to a wide variety of uses.

=== Input–output and socialist planning ===
The input–output model is one of the major conceptual models for a socialist planned economy. This model involves the direct determination of physical quantities to be produced in each industry, which are used to formulate a consistent economic plan of resource allocation. This method of planning is contrasted with price-directed Lange-model socialism and Soviet-style material balance planning.

In the economy of the Soviet Union, planning was conducted using the method of material balances up until the country's dissolution. The method of material balances was first developed in the 1930s during the Soviet Union's rapid industrialization drive. Input–output planning was never adopted because the material balance system had become entrenched in the Soviet economy, and input–output planning was shunned for ideological reasons. As a result, the benefits of consistent and detailed planning through input–output analysis were never realized in the Soviet-type economies.

== Criticism of Input-Output Models ==
The Australia Institute critiques input-output (IO) models for their biases and limitations in assessing the economic impacts of projects and policies. There are limitations and biases inherent in IO models, citing concerns that they are "biased" and "abused" by organizations like the Australian Bureau of Statistics and the Productivity Commission. For instance, the institute's research points out that IO models often assume fixed prices and don't account for resource constraints, which can lead to unrealistic and inflated economic impact estimates. IO models can be misinterpreted and used to justify projects or policies that are not economically sound. The Australia Institute suggests that more robust and comprehensive economic analysis methods should be used to assess economic impacts, rather than relying solely on IO models.

== Measuring input–output tables ==
The mathematics of input–output economics is straightforward, but the data requirements are enormous because the expenditures and revenues of each branch of economic activity have to be represented. As a result, not all countries collect the required data and data quality varies, even though a set of standards for the data's collection has been set out by the United Nations through its System of National Accounts (SNA): the most recent standard is the 2008 SNA. Because the data collection and preparation process for the input–output accounts is necessarily labor and computer intensive, input–output tables are often published long after the year in which the data were collected—typically as much as 5–7 years after. Moreover, the economic "snapshot" that the benchmark version of the tables provides of the economy's cross-section is typically taken only once every few years, at best.

However, many developed countries estimate input–output accounts annually and with much greater recency. This is because while most uses of the input–output analysis focus on the matrix set of inter-industry exchanges, the actual focus of the analysis from the perspective of most national statistical agencies is the benchmarking of gross domestic product. Input–output tables therefore are an instrumental part of national accounts. As suggested above, the core input–output table reports only intermediate goods and services that are exchanged among industries. But an array of row vectors, typically aligned at the bottom of this matrix, record non-industrial inputs by industry like payments for labor; indirect business taxes; dividends, interest, and rents; capital consumption allowances (depreciation); other property-type income (like profits); and purchases from foreign suppliers (imports). At a national level, although excluding the imports, when summed this is called "gross product originating" or "gross domestic product by industry." Another array of column vectors is called "final demand" or "gross product consumed." This displays columns of spending by households, governments, changes in industry stocks, and industries on investment, as well as net exports. (See also Gross domestic product.) In any case, by employing the results of an economic census which asks for the sales, payrolls, and material/equipment/service input of each establishment, statistical agencies back into estimates of industry-level profits and investments using the input–output matrix as a sort of double-accounting framework.

== Further developments ==
=== Physical input-output models ===
Traditionally, input-output models are quantified in monetary units (e.g., Dollars, Euro or Yen). This enables the measurement of GDP as well as the tracing of monetary transactions between sectors and countries. However, these models face major limitations when used to estimate environmental impact. Since the models are linear and static, typically representing a snapshot of one year, it is necessary to assume homogeneity of prices (i.e. the price for a good produced by a sector is the same for the entire year) as well as constant returns to scale (i.e. if production increases by one unit, the impact also increases by one unit), see also Environmentally extended input–output analysis. These issues can be addressed by constructing input-output tables in physical instead of monetary units. This offers several advantages. Firstly, they circumvent the homogenous-price and constant-returns-to-scale assumption. Secondly, physical IO-models are able to capture all flows for which data exists, regardless of whether they have a monetary value or not. This includes flows that are highly relevant for the environment but less relevant for the economy, such as waste or secondary materials. Physical input-output tables using a single physical unit (e.g., Tonnes) were developed from the 1990s onwards, either for single countries/regions, globally integrated tables with subnational detail for single countries, global mixed-unit tables, and global IO-models for biomass flows. While physical IO models offer many benefits, their construction is time-intensive and requires enormous amounts of data. These data typically need to be reconciled from a multitude of sources which are often subject to great uncertainties. This means that models are typically published with a time lag of several years and do not always represent smaller flows in countries with high data scarcity well. To counter this issue, several estimation approaches have been developed, including hybrid-IO techniques which can be applied for regions where detailed monetary tables are available, as well as "PIOlab" approaches, designed to build extensively upon secondary data from accounting frameworks and models.

=== The Leontief IO model with capital formation endogenized ===
The IO model discussed above is static because it does not describe the evolution of the economy over time: it does not include different time periods. Dynamic Leontief models are obtained by endogenizing the formation of capital stock over time. Denote by $y^I$the vector of capital formation, with $y^I_i$ its $i$th element, and by $I_{ij}(t)$ the amount of capital good $i$ (for example, a blade) used in sector $j$ ( for example, wind power generation), for investment at time $t$. We then have

$y^I_i(t) = \sum_j I_{ij}(t)$

We assume that it takes one year for investment in plant and equipment to become productive capacity. Denoting by $K_{ij}(t)$ the stock of $i$ at the beginning of time $t$, and by $\delta \in (0,1]$ the rate of depreciation, we then have:

$K_{ij}(t+1) = I_{ij}(t) + (1-\delta_{ij})K_{ij}(t)$

2

Here, $\delta_{ij}K_{ij}(t)$ refers to the amount of capital stock that is used up in year $t$. Denote by $\bar{x}_j(t)$ the productive capacity in $t$, and assume the following proportionalty between $K_{ij}(t)$ and $\bar{x}_j(t)$:

$K_{ij}(t) = b_{ij}\bar{x}_j(t)$

3

The matrix $B=[b_{ij}]$ is called the capital coefficient matrix. From (2) and (3), we obtain the following expression for $y^I$:

$y^I(t) = B\bar{x}(t+1) + (\delta - I)\bar{x}(t)$

Assuming that the productive capacity is always fully utilized, we obtain the following expression for (1) with endogenized capital formation:

$x(t) = Ax(t)+Bx(t+1)+ (\delta-I)Bx(t) + y^o(t),$

where $y^o$ stands for the items of final demand other than $y^I$.

Rearranged, we have

$$\begin{align}
Bx(t+1) &= (I-A + (I-\delta)B)x(t) - y^o(t)\\
&= (I - \bar{A} + B)x(t) - y^o(t)
\end{align}$$

wehere $\bar{A}=A + \delta B$.

If $B$ is non-singular, this model could be solved for $x(t+1)$ for given $x(t)$ and $y^o(t)$:

$x(t+1) = [I + B^{-1}(I- \bar{A})]x(t) - B^{-1}y^o(t)$

This is the Leontief dynamic forward-looking model

A caveat to this model is that $B$ will, in general, be singular, and the above formulation cannot be obtained. This is because some products, such as energy items, are not used as capital goods, and the corresponding rows of the matrix $B$ will be zeros. This fact has prompted some researchers to consolidate the sectors until the non-singularity of $B$ is achieved, at the cost of sector resolution. Apart from this feature, many studies have found that the outcomes obtained for this forward-looking model invariably lead to unrealistic and widely fluctuating results that lack economic interpretation. This has resulted in a gradual decline in interest in the model after the 1970s, although there is a recent increase in interest within the context of disaster analysis.

== See also ==
- Anthropogenic metabolism
- Computable general equilibrium
- Economic base analysis
- Economic planning
- EIOLCA
- Environmentally extended input–output analysis
- Material flow analysis
- Social metabolism
- Urban metabolism
- Industrial metabolism
- Trade in value added
- System of Environmental-Economic Accounting
- Global value chain
- Fiscal multiplier
- Gross output
- Linear programming
- Industrial organization
- IPO model
- Material balance planning
- Net output
- Shift-share analysis
- Socialist economics

== Bibliography ==
- Dietzenbacher, Erik; Lahr, Michael L., eds. (2004). Wassily Leontief and Input-Output Economics. Cambridge University Press. ISBN 978-1-139-45046-1.
- Isard, Walter et al. Methods of Regional Analysis: An Introduction to Regional Science. MIT Press 1960.
- Isard, Walter and Thomas W. Langford. Regional Input–Output Study: Recollections, Reflections, and Diverse Notes on the Philadelphia Experience. The MIT Press. 1971.
- Lahr, Michael L. and Erik Dietzenbacher, eds. Input–Output Analysis: Frontiers and Extensions. Palgrave, 2001.
- Leontief, Wassily W. Input–Output Economics. 2nd ed., New York: Oxford University Press, 1986.
- Miller, Ronald E. and Peter D. Blair. Input–Output Analysis: Foundations and Extensions. Prentice Hall, 1985.
- Miller, Ronald E. and Peter D. Blair. Input–Output Analysis: Foundations and Extensions, 2nd edition. Cambridge University Press, 2009.
- Miller, Ronald E., Karen R. Polenske, and Adam Z. Rose, eds. Frontiers of Input–Output Analysis. N.Y.: Oxford UP, 1989.[HB142 F76 1989/ Suzz]
- Miernyk, William H. The Elements of Input–Output Analysis, 1965.Web Book-William H. Miernyk.
- Polenske, Karen. Advances in Input–Output Analysis. 1976.
- Econodynamics. New Economic Windows. 2012. doi:10.1007/978-94-007-2096-1. ISBN 978-94-007-2095-4.
- Ten Raa, Thijs (2006). The Economics of Input-Output Analysis. doi:10.1017/CBO9780511610783. ISBN 978-0-521-60267-9.
- US Department of Commerce, Bureau of Economic Analysis . Regional multipliers: A user handbook for regional input–output modeling system (RIMS II). Third edition. Washington, D.C.: U.S. Government Printing Office. 1997.
- Eurostat Eurostat manual of supply, use and input-output tables. Office for Official Publications of the European Communities, 2008.
