= Productive matrix =

Type of matrix in linear algebra

In linear algebra, a square nonnegative matrix $A$ of order $n$ is said to be productive, or to be a Leontief matrix, if there exists a $n \times 1$ nonnegative column matrix $P$ such as $P-AP$ is a positive matrix.

== History ==
The concept of productive matrix was developed by the economist Wassily Leontief (Nobel Prize in Economics in 1973) in order to model and analyze the relations between the different sectors of an economy. The interdependency linkages between the latter can be examined by the input-output model with empirical data.

== Explicit definition ==
The matrix $A\in\mathrm{M}_{n,n}(\R)$ is productive if and only if $A \geqslant 0$ and $\exists P \in\mathrm{M}_{n,1}(\R), P>0$ such as $P-AP>0$.

Here $\mathrm{M}_{r,c}(\R)$ denotes the set of r×c matrices of real numbers, whereas $>0$ and $\geqslant 0$ indicates a positive and a nonnegative matrix, respectively.

== Properties ==
The following properties are proven e.g. in the textbook (Michel 1984).

=== Characterization ===
Theorem A nonnegative matrix $A\in\mathrm{M}_{n,n}(\R)$ is productive if and only if $I_n - A$ is invertible with a nonnegative inverse, where $I_n$ denotes the $n \times n$ identity matrix.

Proof

"If" :

Let $I_n-A$ be invertible with a nonnegative inverse,
Let $U \in\mathrm{M}_{n,1}(\R)$ be an arbitrary column matrix with $U>0$.
Then the matrix $P = (I_n - A)^{-1}U$ is nonnegative since it is the product of two nonnegative matrices.
Moreover, $P - AP = (I_n - A) P = (I_n - A) (I_n - A)^{-1} U = U > 0$.
Therefore $A$ is productive.

"Only if" :

Let $A$ be productive, let $P > 0$ such that $V = P - AP > 0$.
The proof proceeds by reductio ad absurdum.
First, assume for contradiction $I_n - A$ is singular.

The endomorphism canonically associated with $I_n - A$ can not be injective by singularity of the matrix.
Thus some non-zero column matrix $Z\in\mathrm{M}_{n,1}(\R)$ exists such that $(I_n - A) Z = 0$.
The matrix $-Z$ has the same properties as $Z$, therefore we can choose $Z$ as an element of the kernel with at least one positive entry.
Hence $c = \sup_{i \in [|1,n|]}\frac{z_i}{p_i}$ is nonnegative and reached with at least one value $k \in [|1,n|]$.
By definition of $V$ and of $Z$, we can infer that:

$$cv_k = c (p_k - \sum_{i=1}^n a_{ki}p_i) = cp_k -  \sum_{i=1}^n a_{ki}cp_i$$
$cp_k = z_k = \sum_{i=1}^n a_{ki}z_i$, using that $Z = AZ$ by construction.

Thus $cv_k = \sum_{i=1}^n a_{ki} (z_i - cp_i) \leq\ 0$, using that $z_i \leq cp_i$ by definition of $c$.
This contradicts $c > 0$ and $v_k > 0$, hence $I_n - A$ is necessarily invertible.

Second, assume for contradiction $I_n - A$ is invertible but with at least one negative entry in its inverse.

Hence $\exists X \in\mathrm{M}_{n,1}(\R), X \geqslant 0$ such that there is at least one negative entry in $Y = (I_n - A)^{-1} X$.
Then $c = \sup_{i \in [|1,n|]}-\frac{y_i}{p_i}$ is positive and reached with at least one value $k \in [|1,n|]$.
By definition of $V$ and of $X$, we can infer that:

$$cv_k = c (p_k - \sum_{i=1}^n a_{ki}p_i) = -y_k  -\sum_{i=1}^n a_{ki}cp_i$$
$x_k = y_k - \sum_{i=1}^n a_{ki}y_i$, using that $X = (I_n-A)Y$ by construction
$cv_k + x_k = - \sum_{i=1}^n a_{ki} (cp_i + y_i) \geqslant 0$ using that $-y_i \leqslant cp_i$ by definition of $c$.

Thus $x_k \leq - cv_k < 0$, contradicting $X \geqslant 0$.
Therefore $(I_n - A)^{-1}$ is necessarily nonnegative.

=== Transposition ===
Proposition The transpose of a productive matrix is productive.

Proof

Let $A\in\mathrm{M}_{n,n}(\R)$ a productive matrix.
Then $(I_n - A)^{-1}$ exists and is nonnegative.
Yet $(I_n - A^T)^{-1} = ((I_n - A)^T)^{-1} = ((I_n - A)^{-1})^T$
Hence $(I_n - A^T)$ is invertible with a nonnegative inverse.
Therefore $A^T$ is productive.

== Application ==
With a matrix approach of the input-output model, the consumption matrix is productive if it is economically viable and if the latter and the demand vector are nonnegative.
