= Material flow accounting =

Study of material flows on a national or regional scale

Material flow accounting (MFA) is the study of material flows on a national or regional scale. It is therefore sometimes also referred to as regional, national or economy-wide material flow analysis.

== Introduction ==
Material flow accounting provides economy-wide data on material use. Through international standardization, this data has become reliable and comparable across countries. Increasingly, the data are also being made available in medium- to long-term time series allowing for the analysis of past trends as well as potential future developments. Material flow accounts provide information on the material inputs into, the changes in material stock within, and the material outputs in the form of exports to other economies or discharges to the environment of an economy. Material flow accounting can be used in national planning, especially for scarce resources, and also allows for forecasting. The method can be used to assess environmental burdens associated with the economic activities of a nation and to determine how material intensive an economy is.

The principle concept underlying MFA is a simple model of this interrelation between the economy and the environment, in which the economy is an embedded subsystem of the environment. Similar to living beings, this subsystem is dependent on a constant throughput of materials and energy. Raw materials, water and air are extracted from the natural system as inputs, transformed into products and finally re-transferred to the natural system as outputs (waste and emissions). In order to highlight the similarity to natural metabolic processes, the terms "industrial" or "societal" metabolism have been introduced.

In MFA studies for a region or on a national level the flows of materials between the natural environment and the economy are analyzed and quantified on a physical level. The focus may be on individual substances (e.g. Cadmium flows), specific materials, or bulk material flows (e.g. steel and steel scrap flows within an economy). Researchers in this field are organized in the Socio-Economic Metabolism (SEM) section of the International Society for Industrial Ecology (ISIE).

Statistics related to material flow accounting are usually compiled by national statistical offices, using economic, agricultural and trade statistics measuring the exchange of material between different products available in an economy.

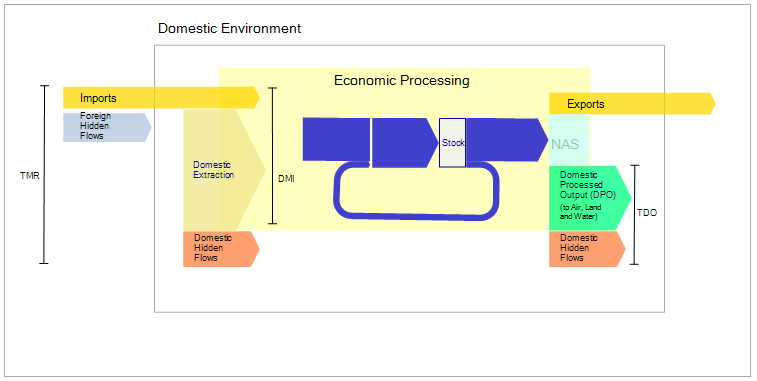
Material flow accounting scheme

== Scope and indicators ==
Aside from calculating the net additions to stock (NAS) as a balancing item, flows within the economy are not considered (advances are currently being made in the field of dynamic stock modelling). MFA covers all solid, gaseous, and liquid materials, mobilized by humans or by their livestock, with the exception of bulk water and air. The unit of measurement is most commonly (metric) tonnes per year (t/a). Flows are distinguished by whether they are extracted domestically (domestic extraction, DE) or are trade flows (imports or exports). Materials are most commonly grouped according to four main material categories: biomass, fossil energy carriers, metals, and non-metallic minerals. The former category may be further differentiated by type of use into industrial and construction minerals. MFA seeks to provide a complete picture of an economy's material use so that materials are included in these accounts irrespective of whether or not they have direct market value. The most prominent non-market flows covered by MFA are grazed biomass and used crop residues as well as waste rock extracted during mining activities. In 2010, these material flows accounted for 21% of global extraction.

The data collected in MFA is used to calculate several different standardized indicators:

- Direct material input (DMI) is a measure of the total material inputs into an economy and is calculated as the sum of domestic extraction (DE) and imports.
- The physical trade balance (PTB) is a measure of net-imports and is calculated as the difference between imports and exports. Reflecting that material and money flow in opposite directions during trade, this is a contrast to the monetary trade balance which calculates net-exports.
- Domestic material consumption (DMC) is a measure of apparent consumption and calculated from domestic extraction plus imports minus exports (or DE plus PTB).

Economy-wide MFA is a satellite system to the system of national accounts and provides a rich empirical database for analytical studies. More information on how the statistics are collected, under what legal framework and how they are defined is available in Economy-wide material flow accounts.

In addition, the following indicators are may be used in material flow accounting:

- Total material requirement (TMR) includes the domestic extraction of resources (minerals, fossil fuels, biomass), the indirect flows caused by and associated with the domestic extraction (called "hidden flows") and the imports.
- Hidden flows are materials that are extracted or moved, but do not enter the economy. According to OECD, the "displacement of environmental assets without absorption into the economic sphere", such as overburden from mining operations.
- Domestic processed output (DPO) is defined by the OECD as "the total mass of materials which have been used in the national economy, before flowing into the environment. These flows occur at the processing, manufacturing, use, and final disposal stages of the economic production-consumption chain."
- Total domestic output (TDO) includes the domestic processed output (DPO) plus the hidden flows associated with the domestic production.
- Raw material consumption (RMC) includes the raw materials that are embodied in traded products (e.g. metal ores from which metals have been extracted). RMC does not include hidden flows. RMC is most commonly calculated via environmentally extended input–output analysis.

== See also ==
- Anthropogenic metabolism
- Dynamic stock modelling
- Economy-wide material flow accounts
- Environmentally extended input–output analysis
- Industrial ecology
- Industrial metabolism
- Input–output model
- Material criticality
- Material flow analysis
- Material flow management
- Social metabolism
- Sustainability
- Urban metabolism
