= Industrial ecology =

Study of matter and energy flow in industrial systems

Industrial ecology (IE) is the study of material and energy flows through industrial systems. The global industrial economy can be modelled as a network of industrial processes that extract resources from the Earth and transform those resources into by-products, products and services which can be bought and sold to meet the needs of humanity. Industrial ecology seeks to quantify the material flows and document the industrial processes that make modern society function. Industrial ecologists are often concerned with the impacts that industrial activities have on the environment, with the use of the planet's supply of natural resources, and with problems of waste disposal. Industrial ecology is a young but growing multidisciplinary field of research which combines aspects of engineering, economics, sociology, toxicology and the natural sciences.

Industrial ecology has been defined as a "systems-based, multidisciplinary discourse that seeks to understand emergent behavior of complex integrated human/natural systems". The field approaches issues of sustainability by examining problems from multiple perspectives, usually involving aspects of sociology, the environment, economy and technology. The name comes from the idea that the analogy of natural systems should be used as an aid in understanding how to design sustainable industrial systems.

== Overview ==
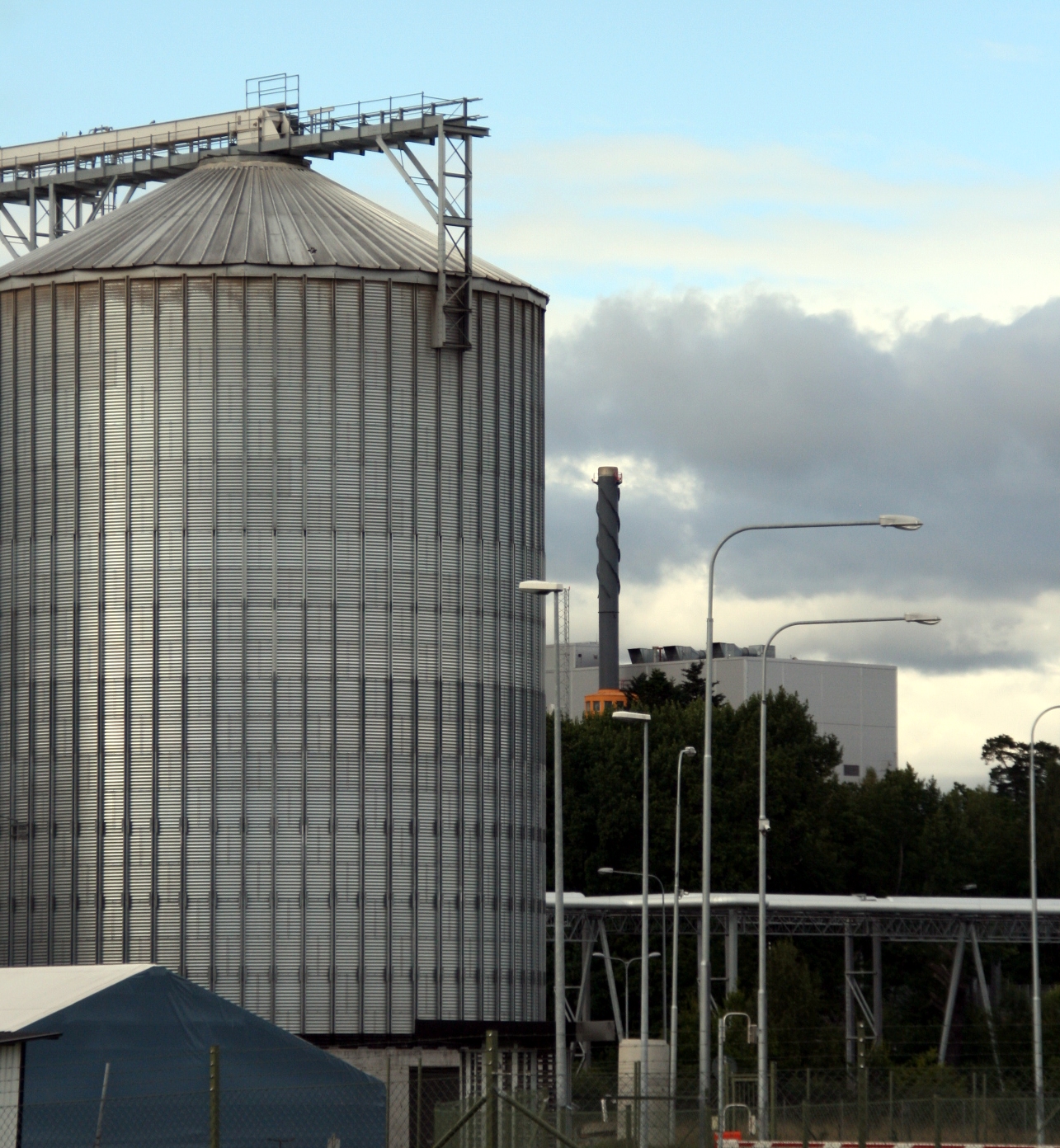
Example of industrial symbiosis. Waste steam from a waste incinerator (right) is piped to an ethanol plant (left) where it is used as an input to their production process.

Industrial ecology is concerned with shifting industrial processes from linear (open-loop) systems, in which resource and capital investments move through the system to become waste, to a closed-loop system where wastes can become inputs for new processes.

Much of the research focuses on the following areas:

- material and energy flow studies ("industrial metabolism")
- dematerialization and decarbonization
- technological change and the environment
- life-cycle planning, design and assessment
- design for the environment ("eco-design")
- extended producer responsibility ("product stewardship")
- eco-industrial parks ("industrial symbiosis")
- product-oriented environmental policy
- eco-efficiency

Industrial ecology seeks to understand how industrial systems (for example a factory, an ecoregion, or a national or global economy) interact with the biosphere. Natural ecosystems provide a metaphor for understanding how different parts of industrial systems interact, within an "ecosystem" based on resources and infrastructural capital rather than on natural capital. It seeks to exploit the idea that natural systems do not have waste in them to inspire sustainable design.

Along with more general energy conservation and material conservation goals, and redefining related international trade markets and product stewardship relations strictly as a service economy, industrial ecology is one of the four objectives of Natural Capitalism. This strategy discourages forms of amoral purchasing arising from ignorance of what goes on at a distance and implies a political economy that values natural capital highly and relies on more instructional capital to design and maintain each unique industrial ecology.

== History ==
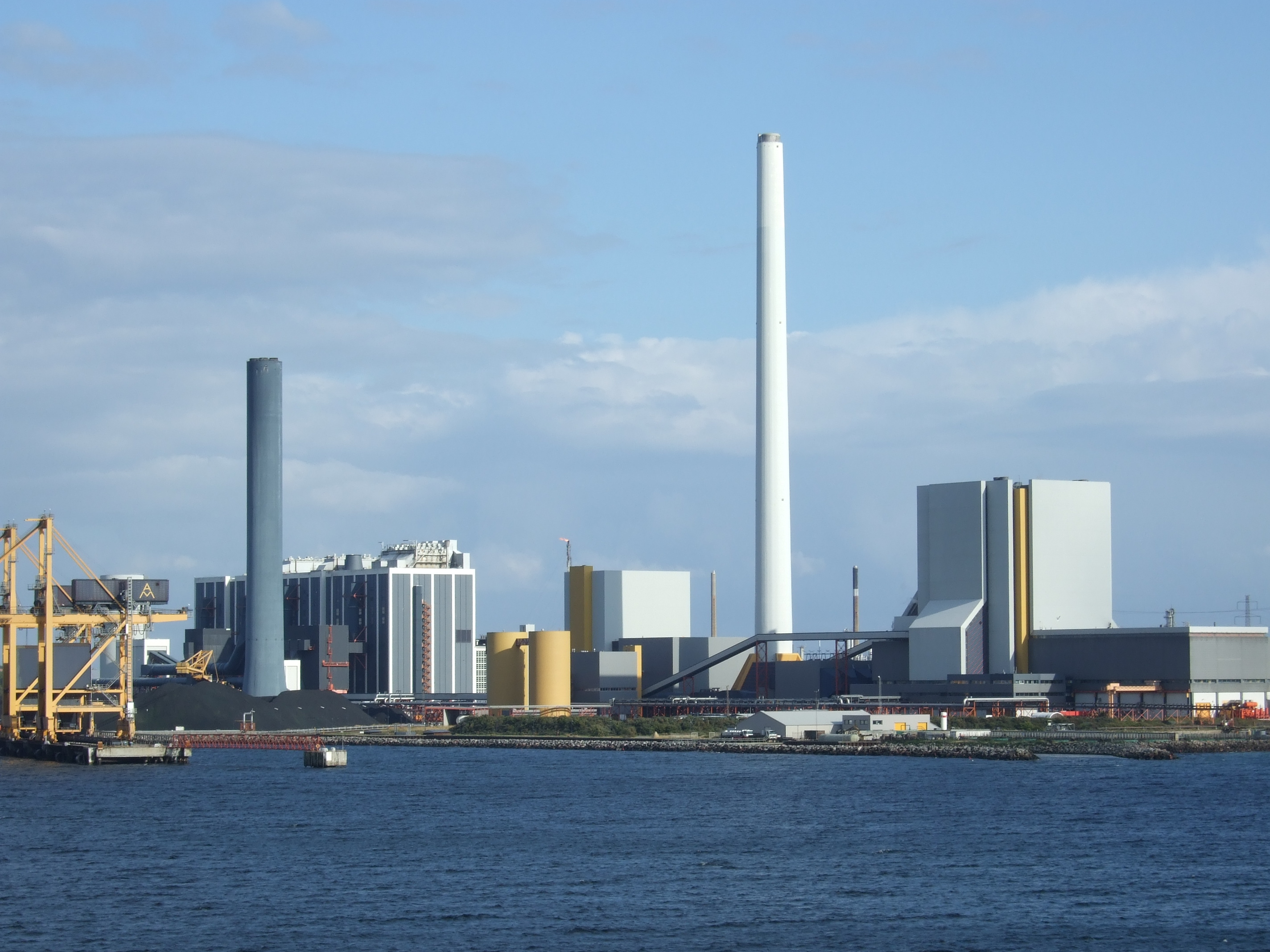
View of Kalundborg Eco-industrial Park

Industrial ecology was popularized in 1989 in a Scientific American article by Robert Frosch and Nicholas E. Gallopoulos. Frosch and Gallopoulos' vision was "why would not our industrial system behave like an ecosystem, where the wastes of a species may be resource to another species? Why would not the outputs of an industry be the inputs of another, thus reducing use of raw materials, pollution, and saving on waste treatment?" A notable example resides in a Danish industrial park in the city of Kalundborg. Here several linkages of byproducts and waste heat can be found between numerous entities such as a large power plant, an oil refinery, a pharmaceutical plant, a plasterboard factory, an enzyme manufacturer, a waste company and the city itself. Another example is the Rantasalmi EIP in Rantasalmi, Finland. While this country has had previous organically formed EIP's, the park at Rantasalmi is Finland's first planned EIP.

The scientific field of industrial ecology has grown quickly. The Journal of Industrial Ecology (since 1997), the International Society for Industrial Ecology (since 2001), and the journal Progress in Industrial Ecology (since 2004) give Industrial Ecology a strong and dynamic position in the international scientific community. Industrial ecology principles are also emerging in various policy realms such as the circular economy. Although the definition of the circular economy has yet to be formalized, generally the focus is on strategies such as creating a circular flow of materials and cascading energy flows. An example of this would be using waste heat from one process to run another process that requires a lower temperature. The hope is that strategies such as this will create a more efficient economy with fewer pollutants and other unwanted by-products.

== Examples ==
The Kalundborg industrial park is located in Denmark. This industrial park is special because companies reuse each other's waste (which then becomes by-products). For example, the Energy E2 Asnæs Power Station produces gypsum as a by-product of electricity generation; this gypsum becomes a resource for BPB Gyproc A/S which produces plasterboards. This is one example of a system inspired by the biosphere-technosphere metaphor: in ecosystems, the waste from one organism is used as inputs to other organisms; in industrial systems, waste from a company is used as a resource by others.

Apart from the direct benefit of incorporating waste into the loop, the use of an eco-industrial park can be a means of making renewable energy-generating plants, such as Solar PV, more economical and environmentally friendly. In essence, this assists the growth of the renewable energy industry and the environmental benefits that come with replacing fossil fuels.

Additional examples of industrial ecology include:

- Substituting the fly ash byproduct of coal burning practices for cement in concrete production
- Using second-generation biofuels. An example of this is converting grease or cooking oil to biodiesels to fuel vehicles.
- South Africa's National Cleaner Production Center (NCPC) was created in order to make the region's industries more efficient in terms of materials. Results of the use of sustainable methods will include reduced energy costs and improved waste management. The program assesses existing companies to implement change.
- Onsite non-potable water reuse
- Biodegradable plastic created from polymerized chicken feathers, which are 90% keratin and account for over 6 million tons of waste in the EU and US annually. As agricultural waste, the chicken feathers are recycled into disposable plastic products which are then easily biodegraded into soil.
- Toyota Motor Company channels a portion of the greenhouse gases emitted back into their system as recovered thermal energy.
- Anheuser-Busch signed a memorandum of understanding with biochemical company Blue Marble to use brewing wastes as the basis for its "green" products.
- Enhanced oil recovery at Petra Nova.
- Reusing cork from wine bottles for use in shoe soles, flooring tiles, building insulation, automotive gaskets, craft materials, and soil conditioner.
- Darling Quarter Commonwealth Bank Place North building in Sydney, Australia recycles and reuses its wastewater.
- Plant-based plastic packaging that is 100% recyclable and environmentally friendly.
- Food waste can be used for compost, which can be used as a natural fertilizer for future food production. Additionally, food waste that has not been contaminated can be used to feed those experiencing food insecurity.
- Hellisheiði geothermal power station uses groundwater to produce electricity and hot water for the city of Reykjavik. Their carbon byproducts are then injected back into the Earth and calcified, leaving the station with net-zero carbon emissions.

== Future directions ==
The ecosystem metaphor popularized by Frosch and Gallopoulos has been a valuable creative tool for helping researchers look for novel solutions to difficult problems. Recently, it has been pointed out that this metaphor is based largely on a model of classical ecology, and that advancements in understanding ecology based on complexity science have been made by researchers such as C. S. Holling, James J. Kay, and further advanced in terms of contemporary ecology by others. For industrial ecology, this may mean a shift from a more mechanistic view of systems, to one where sustainability is viewed as an emergent property of a complex system. To explore this further, several researchers are working with agent based modeling techniques.

Exergy analysis is performed in industrial ecology to use energy more efficiently. The term exergy was coined by Zoran Rant in 1956, but the concept was developed by J. Willard Gibbs. In recent decades, utilization of exergy has spread outside physics and engineering to the fields of industrial ecology, ecological economics, systems ecology, and energetics.

== See also ==
- Anthropogenic metabolism – Material and energy turnover of human society
- Biomimicry – Imitation of biological systems for the solving of human problems
- Cleaner production – Preventive, company-specific environmental protection initiative
- Conservation (ethic) – Movement to protect the biosphere
- Ecodesign – Design approach sensitive to environmental impacts
- Ecological modernization – Environmental theory linking economic growth with sustainable technological solutions
- Energy accounting – Analysis of power consumption
- Energy development – Methods bringing energy into production
- Environmental economics – Sub-field of economics
- Environmental design – Design process
- Environmental racism – Environmental injustice that occurs within a racialized context
- Environmental sustainable innovation – Business development concept
- Evolutionary economics – Subject inspired by evolutionary biology
- Helix of sustainability
- Green economy – Economy based on ecological economics
- Industrial symbiosis – Ability of manufacturers to share resources and reuse each other's waste
- Low-carbon economy – Climate-friendly economy
- Life cycle assessment – Methodology for assessing environmental impacts
- Material flow accounting – Study of material flows on a national or regional scale
- Material flow analysis – Analysis of the movement of substances within various systems
- Modular construction systems – Construction technique
- Organigraph
- Product stewardship – Managing the environmental impact of different products and materials
- Reconciliation ecology – Study of maintaining biodiversity in human-dominated ecosystems
- Social metabolism – Study of materials and energy flows between nature and society
- Urban metabolism – Model of the flows of materials and energy in cities
- Waste input-output model
