= Material criticality =

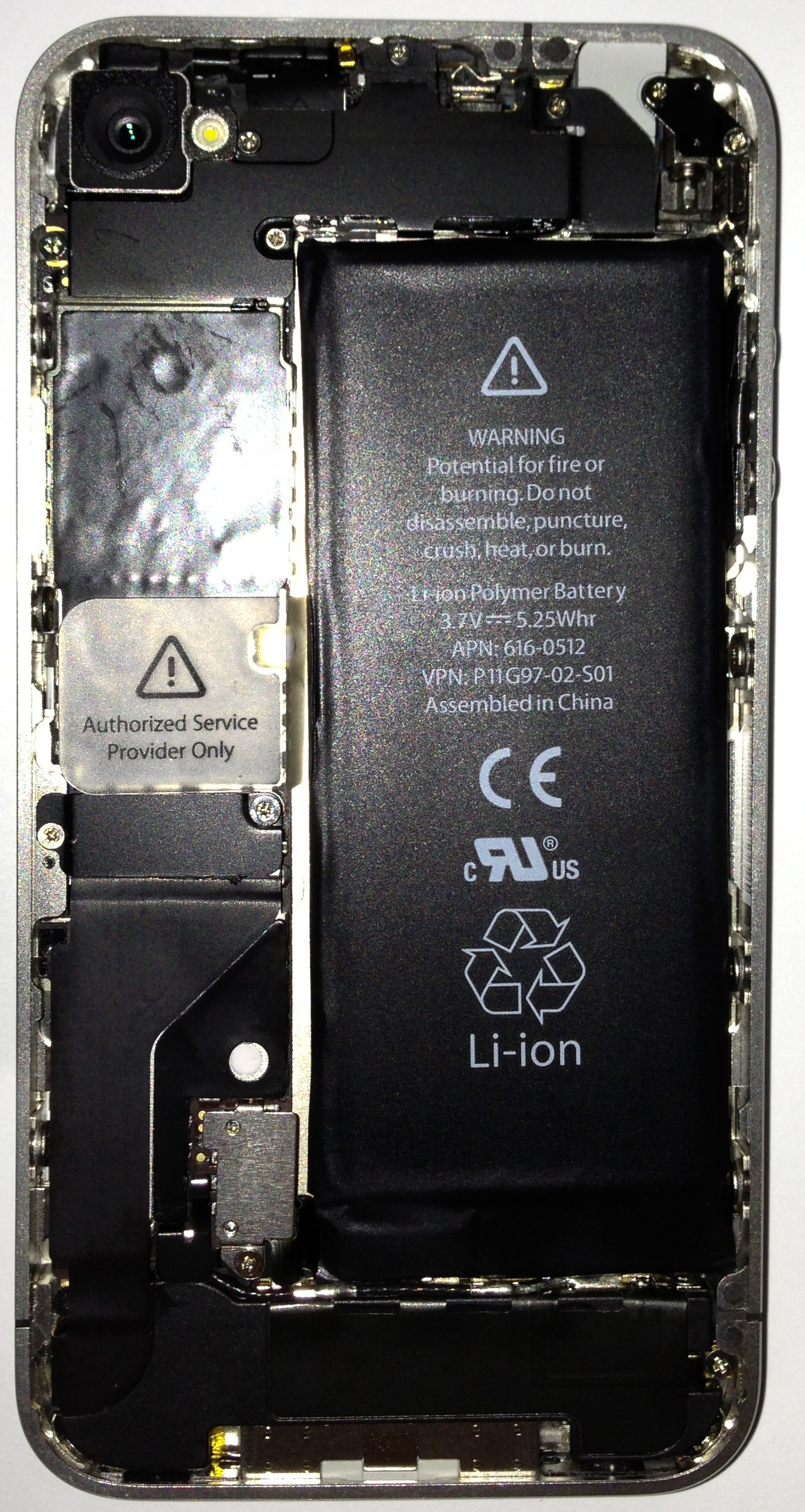
Inside an iPhone

Material criticality is the determination of which materials that flow through an industry or economy are most important to the production process. It is a sub-category within the field of material flow analysis (MFA), which is a method to quantitatively analyze the flows of materials used for industrial production in an industry or economy. MFA is a useful tool to assess what impacts materials used in the industrial process have and how efficiently a given process uses them.

Material criticality evaluation criteria consist of three dimensions: supply risk, vulnerability to supply restriction, and environmental implications. Supply risk comprises several components, and changes based on short or long-term temporal outlooks. Vulnerability to supply restriction is dependent on the organizational level (global, national, and corporate). This methodology was developed from a United States National Research Council model, and is intended to help stakeholders make strategic decisions about the materials used in their production process. In the globalized economy, scarcity of essential materials in the industrial supply chain is a growing concern. As a result, nations and other large institutions are increasingly analyzing a material's criticality and seek to minimize any risk, restriction, or environmental impact associated with the material.

== Supply risk ==
Supply risk is one of three dimensions that determine a material's criticality. Supply risk can be evaluated for the medium term (5–10 years, typically most appropriate for corporations and governments) and the long term (multiple decades, usually considered by long-range planners, futurists, and sustainability scholars). Supply risk consists of three components: Geological, Technological, and Economic; Social and Regulatory; Geopolitical. The first component focuses on the availability of the material's supply and the last two focus on how access to that supply could be restricted. The components are assessed on a 0-100 scale for both medium and long-term risk with higher values indicating higher risk. The aggregated scores yield a material's supply risk.

=== Geological, Technological, and Economic ===
The geological, technological and economic components of supply risk relate to the most basic questions relating to a materials availability; geologically, how much (material) is there; technologically, is it feasible to obtain; and economically, is it practical to do so. This component comprises two indicators of equal weight. The first looks at the relative abundance of material resulting in "depletion time" or relatively how much of the material has not been consumed. The second is a percentage of a given material extracted as a companion or trace material extracted as a by-product. This is used to understand depletion rates of materials consumed as a by-product to extraction.

Quoting Graedel et al., "One should not regard the result as how long it will be until we run out, but rather as a useful relative indicator of the contemporary balance between supply and demand for the metal in question."

In practice, geological, technological, economic, political and other aspects of criticality are interconnected. For example, new exploration technologies can alter geological availability, shortages can lead to higher prices which can in turn promote technological innovation.

=== Social and Regulatory ===
The social and regulatory components of a materials supply risk can impede or expedite the development of mineral resources. Regulations can hinder the reliability of mineral resource supply. Social perceptions towards the negative environmental and socioeconomic effects on communities typically fuel these regulations.

Material criticality employs the policy potential index (PPI) and human development index (HDI) indicators to quantify the social and regulatory components of supply risk evaluation.

=== Geopolitical ===
The geopolitical component of a material's supply risk takes into account how governmental decisions and stability can significantly impact a material's accessibility. For example, politically unstable and war-torn nations pose a greater risk to supply restriction than developed peaceful nations. Material concentration, geographic location, security, socio-economic distress, and political stability are all analyzed to address what amount the geopolitical component should factor into a material's supply risk.

=== Metal scarcity ===
Metals are among the most important materials to the industrialized world, everything from infrastructure to personal electronic devices heavily relies on metals for production. As a result, global supply is being increasingly monitored and examined. For example, a recent study analyzed the varying levels of risk to the copper metals around the world. Another study found that increasing metal scarcity could alter typical industrial behavior. It also noted that metals heavily concentrated in certain geographic areas, such as strontium in China or the platinum group in South Africa and Russia; pose greater risk for supply disruptions.

Since the late 1990s China has had a near monopoly on a variety of rare-earth metals commonly used in every day products. Much to the surprise of the international trade community China began restricting exports of these metals in 2009. The U.S. and World Trade Organization immediately protested however China has not changed its stance. This is a great example of a geopolitical based supply risk. To combat this supply disruption other countries, such as Japan, are attempting new and innovative methods of mining these rare-earth metals.

== Vulnerability to Supply Restriction ==
Vulnerability to Supply Restriction (VSR) is an index that tells us how likely a particular element is to be restricted due to usage and availability. What evaluates the importance of a particular element at a social, economic and political level can be evaluated at three organizational levels; corporate, national and global levels. In total, it comprises eight indicator categories for the Corporate and National level, and 4 for the Global. VSR is important in evaluating each significant end-use applications of a material separately. The current approach realizes that indicators may be common or be specific for one to two. The three organizational levels use an adjusted 0-100 scale, including 4 bins, each with a range of 25 points. Quantifying the VSR is based on materials importance and substitutability, and an ability to innovate can be included at some organizational levels.

=== Global ===
VSR at the Global level is focused on the intrinsic value of a material to the society of a country or countries and to what level a substitution is possible. It is not a short term evaluation and none of its indicators are evaluated as such. The global levels matrix does not include as many categories as the Corporate and National level VSR evaluations are. They are only evaluated by the Importance and Substitutability.

1) Importance This consists of an indicator labeled percentage of population utilizing.

2) Substitutability This comprises substitute performance, substitute availability, and the environmental impact ratio.

=== National ===
Introduce national vulnerability to supply restriction: Looks at importance of an element, but does it through domestic industries and the country's population. It is evaluated on either a short or long term, and can be regarded as more intermediate in time.

1) Importance Composed of two indicators: national economic importance and percentage of population utilizing element.

2) Substitutability Indicators are the same as at the corporate level except for that Price ratio is now labeled Net Importance price ratio.

3) Susceptibility This category is no longer labeled “Ability to Innovate” as it was at the corporate level. It has been renamed “Susceptibility” and its indicator has been updated from Corporate Innovation to a focus on: (1) Net Importance Reliance and (2) Global Innovation Index.

=== Corporate ===
At the corporate level VSR is used to find the importance of an element in regards to (1) corporations current product lines (2) corporations Future product lines; with economic considerations each. (3) Ability to innovate. The corporate level is used to reinforce the belief that these innovative corporations are adapting more quickly to supply restriction. Emphasis on economic considerations. There is a development of sets of varied scenarios so that an estimate for how they might evolve is available.

1) Importance Two indicators: national economic importance and percentage of population utilizing.

2) Substitutability Substitutability evaluates (1) Substitute Performance (2) Substitute Availability (3) Environmental Impact Ration (4) Price Ratio. This evaluates the possible implications of an alternative material or metal in case the one at hand has a larger environmental impact or is in short supply.

3) Ability to Innovate A corporation that uses natural resources is dependent upon that resource and a disruption in its supply can impact revenues and market share. A competitor's ability to find a substitute or more efficient means of extraction could overtake a corporation.

=== Toyota vs Ford and Lithium ===
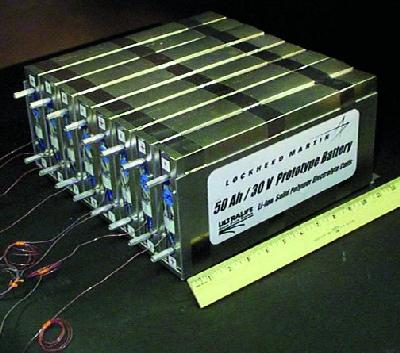
Lithium Ion Battery

Lithium is used in Toyota and Ford cars' electric car batteries. Lithium is an energy critical element (ECE) and a non-renewable resource. About 100 times more lithium is necessary in an electric car battery as in a standard laptop battery. As society tries to lessen fossil fuel usage through the use of electric vehicles, lithium will be subjected to increased demand.

At the corporate level, lithium must be evaluated in terms of its importance to the company and see to what extent it can be replaced in the company's products. Both Ford and Toyota's current and most used batteries in electric cars are lithium-ion batteries. Ford Motor company's senior manager of energy storage research stated, “There are foreseen limits of lithium ion technology,” this was stated in coordination with a graph estimating a diminishing number by 2017. . According to Toyota's environmental technology corporate strategy, “As Toyota anticipates the widespread use of electric vehicles in the future, we have begun research in developing next-generation secondary batteries with performance that greatly exceeds that of lithium-ion batteries.”

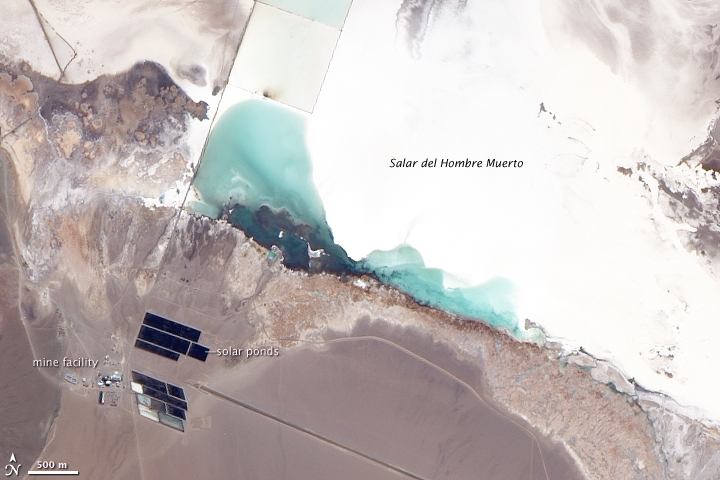
Lithium mine, Salar del Hombre Muerto, Argentina

At the national level, lithium-producing countries must consider their national lithium policies. The major lithium-producing countries include Bolivia, Chile, Argentina, Afghanistan, and Tibet. The high demand for lithium could bring large revenues into these resource-rich nations: a ton of lithium can sell for anywhere between $4500 and $5200, and the purer lithium that is used in batteries sells at the upper end of that interval. Bolivia's current reserve is estimated to be around 100 million tons. By comparison, the current market value of a ton of zinc is roughly $2670.

Finally, at the global level, highly developed countries are the ones extracting resources and bringing industry into poorer countries. In terms of the population utilizing lithium, there is a relatively large number of people using lithium, with technology encompassing a large percent of our interactions and activities in the world. With some villages in Africa operating more cell phones than bathrooms, it is reasonable to estimate a large percent of the world uses lithium, and to predict that the material usage will increase as industrialization and technological dependency grows. In terms of Toyota and Ford's lithium usage, as of 2005, global zinc air production could produce enough zinc-air batteries to power 1 billion electric vehicles, and lithium reserves could only power ten million lithium-ion powered vehicles .

== Environmental implication ==
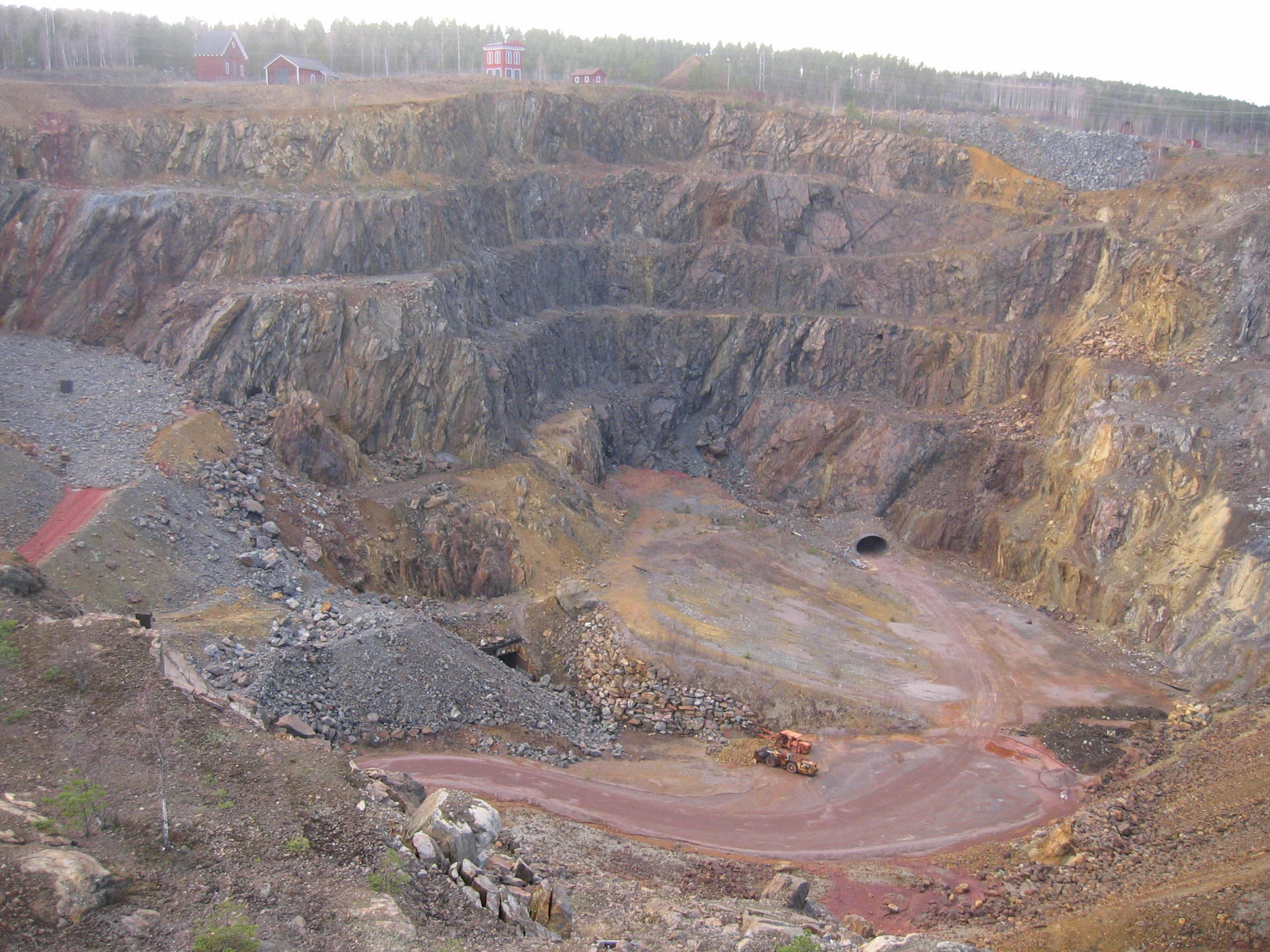
Copper Mine

The burden that various materials impose on the environment is considered in material criticality. There are numerous negative effects that materials can have on the environment due to either their toxicity, the amounts of energy and water used in processing, and their emissions into the air, water and the land. The purpose of including an evaluation of environmental implications is to transfer information on potential impacts of using a specific material to product designers, government officials, and nongovernmental agencies.

The environmental implication evaluation can use data from a source like the Ecoinvent Database. The ecoinvent database provides a single score for the negative impact to human health and ecosystems on a scale from 0–100. The scope of the score is Cradle to Gate.

Environmental implications can also be reflected in social attitudes that may pose as a barrier to the development of resources in the form of objections to extraction. These objections may arise from a fear of how the new extraction site could potentially negatively impact the surrounding communities and ecosystems. This barrier can affect the reliability and security of resources.

Improved technology and infrastructure in the recycling re-use, and more efficient use of materials could mitigate some of the negative environmental impacts associated with them. This could also improve the reliability and security of resources.

An example of environmental implications is the ban on lead (Pb) in many products. Once government officials and product designers became aware of the dangers of lead government and company policies started prohibiting its use.

== Criticality focus ==
Material criticality is a relatively new field of research. As global industrial activity continues to increase a wide array of stakeholders are paying more attention to material criticality in order to assess how production processes may be impacted and made more efficient. British Petroleum, the United States Department of Energy, and the European Union have all established review procedures to determine material criticality and how it affects their behavior. Additionally, there has been a growing body of academic study in this field, led by Thomas Graedel of Yale. Material criticality is going to be an essential factor in the industrial production process for the foreseeable future.

== See also ==
- Agroecosystem analysis
- Anthropogenic metabolism
- Industrial metabolism
- Life-cycle assessment
- Limiting factor
- Material Flow Analysis
- Social metabolism
- Supply chain risk management
- Supply chain sustainability
- Urban metabolism
