= Material flow analysis =

Analysis of the movement of substances within various systems

Material flow analysis (MFA), also referred to as substance flow analysis (SFA), is an analytical method to quantify flows and stocks of materials or substances in a well-defined system. MFA is an important tool to study the bio-physical aspects of human activity on different spatial and temporal scales. It is considered a core method of industrial ecology or anthropogenic, urban, social and industrial metabolism. MFA is used to study material, substance, or product flows across different industrial sectors or within ecosystems. MFA can also be applied to a single industrial installation, for example, for tracking nutrient flows through a waste water treatment plant. When combined with an assessment of the costs associated with material flows this business-oriented application of MFA is called material flow cost accounting. MFA is an important tool to study the circular economy and to devise material flow management. Since the 1990s, the number of publications related to material flow analysis has grown steadily. Peer-reviewed journals that publish MFA-related work include the Journal of Industrial Ecology, Ecological Economics, Environmental Science and Technology, and Resources, Conservation, and Recycling.

== Methodology ==
=== Motivation ===
Human needs such as shelter, food, transport, or communication require materials like wood, starch, sugar, iron and steel, copper, or semiconductors. As society develops and economic activity expands, material production, use, and disposal increase to a level where unwanted impacts on environment and society cannot be neglected anymore, neither locally nor globally. Material flows are at the core of local environmental problems such as leaching from landfills or oil spills. Rising concern about global warming puts a previously unimportant waste flow, carbon dioxide, on top of the political and scientific agenda. The gradual shift from primary material production to urban mining in developed countries requires a detailed assessment of in-use and obsolete stocks of materials within human society. Scientists, industries, government bodies, and NGOs therefore need a tool that complements economic accounting and modelling. They need a systematic method to keep track of and display stocks and flows of the materials entering, staying within, and leaving the different processes in the anthroposphere. Material flow analysis is such a method.

=== Basic principles ===
MFA is based on two fundamental and well-established scientific principles, the systems approach and mass balance. The system definition is the starting point of every MFA study.

==== System definition ====
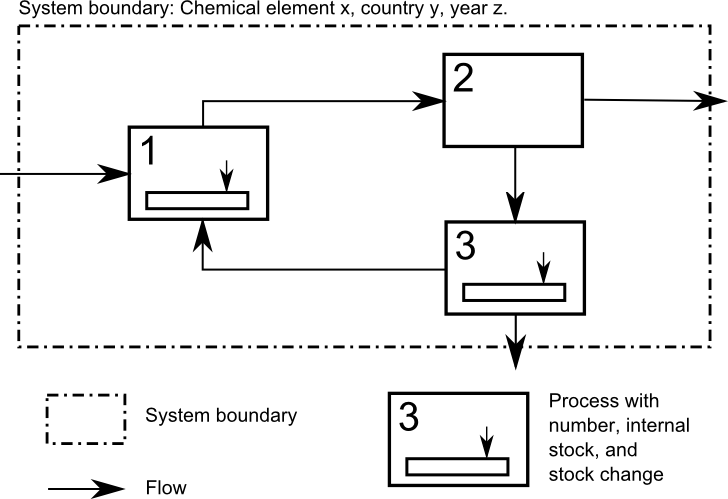
Basic MFA system without quantification.

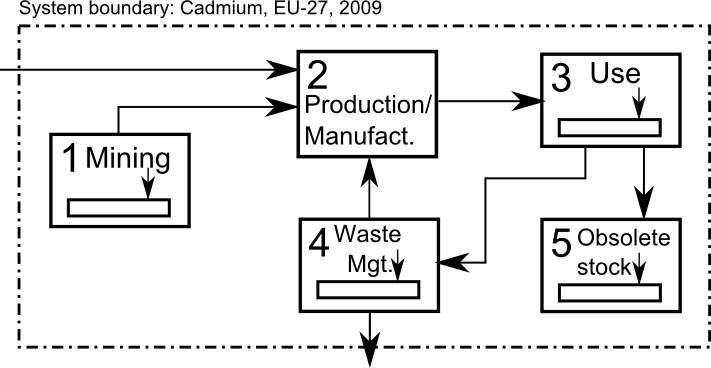
A more general MFA system without quantification.

An MFA system is a model of an industrial plant, an industrial sector or a region of concern. The level of detail of the system model is chosen to fit the purpose of the study. An MFA system always consists of the system boundary, one or more processes, material flows between processes, and stocks of materials within processes. Physical exchange between the system and its environment happens via flows that cross the system boundary. Contrary to the preconceived notion that a system represents a specific industrial installation, systems and processes in MFA can represent much larger and more abstract entities as long as they are well-defined. The explicit system definition helps the practitioner to locate the available quantitative information in the system, either as stocks within certain processes or as flows between processes. An MFA system description can be refined by disaggregating processes or simplified by aggregating processes.

Next to specifying the arrangement of processes, stocks, and flows in the system definition, the practitioner also needs to indicate the scale and the indicator element or material of the system studied. The spatial scale describes the geographic entity that is covered by the system. A system representing a certain industrial sector can be applied to the USA, China, certain world regions, or the world as a whole. The temporal scale describes the point in time or the time span for which the system is quantified. The indicator element or material of the system is the physical entity that is measured and for which the mass balance holds. As the name says, an indicator element is a certain chemical element such as cadmium or a substance such as CO_{2}. In general, a material or a product can also be used as indicator as long as a process balance can be established for it. Examples of more general indicators are goods such as passenger cars, materials like steel, or other physical quantities such as energy.

MFA requires practitioners to make precise use of the terms 'material', 'substance', or 'good', as laid out, for example, in chapter 2.1 of Brunner and Rechberger, one of the main references for the MFA method.

- A chemical element is "a pure chemical substance consisting of one type of atom distinguished by its atomic number".
- A substance is "any (chemical) element or compound composed of uniform units. All substances are characterised by a unique and identical constitution and are thus homogeneous." From chapter 2.1.1 in Brunner&Rechberger.
- A good is defined as "economic entity of matter with a positive or negative economic value. Goods are made up of one or several substances". From chapter 2.1.2 in Brunner and Rechberger.
- The term material in MFA "serves as an umbrella term for both substances and goods". From chapter 2.1.3 in Brunner&Rechberger.

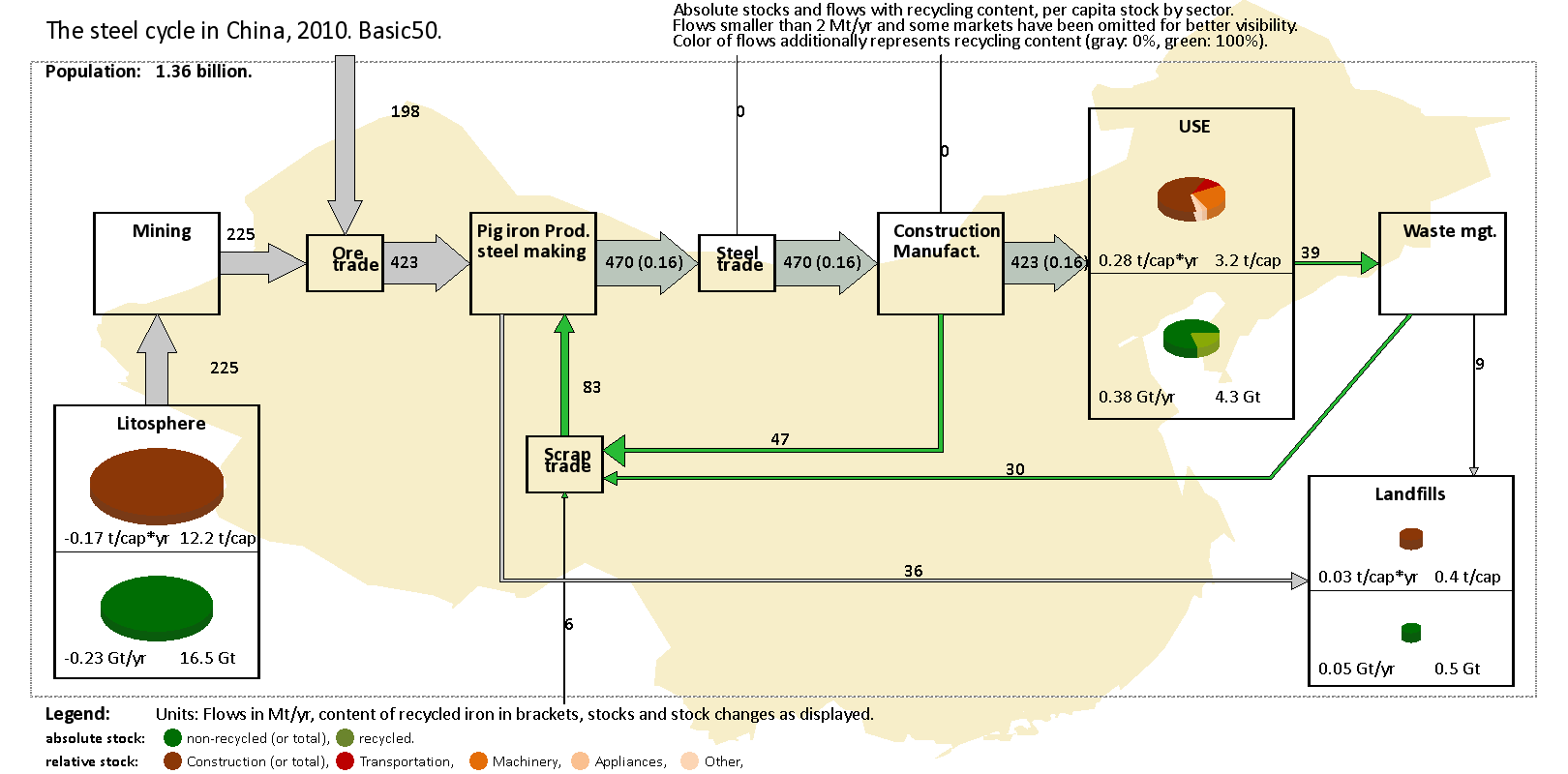
A typical MFA system with quantification.

==== Process balance ====
One of the main purposes of MFA is to quantify the metabolism of the elements of the system. Unlike economic accounting, MFA also covers non-economic waste flows, emissions to the environment, and non-market natural resources.

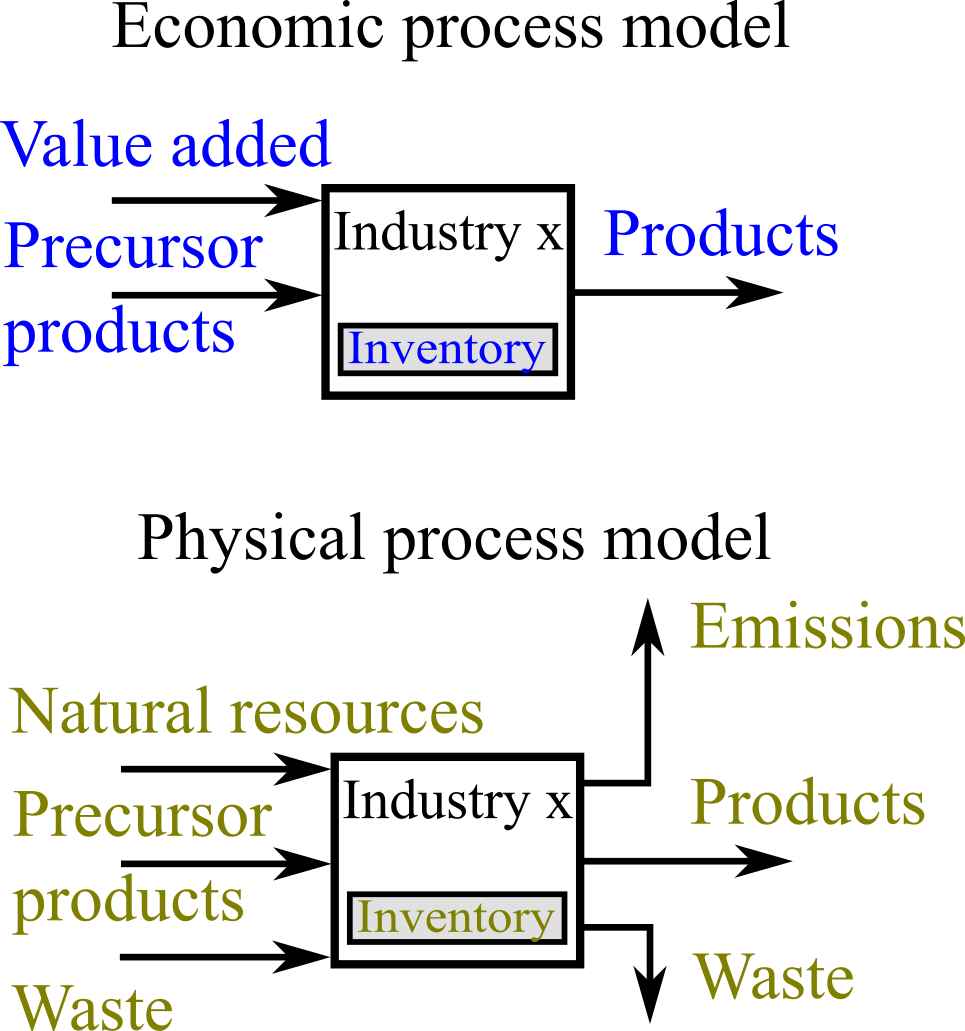
Model of an industrial process in economic accounting (top) and in physical accounting (bottom).

The process balance is a first order physical principle that turns MFA into a powerful accounting and analysis tool. The nature of the processes in the system determine which balances apply. For a process 'oil refinery', for example, one can establish a mass balance for each chemical element, while this is not possible for a nuclear power station. A car manufacturing plant respects the balance for steel, but a steel mill does not.

When quantifying MFA systems either by measurements or from statistical data, mass and other process balances have to be checked to ensure the correctness of the quantification and to reveal possible data inconsistencies or even misconceptions in the system such as the omission of a flow or a process. Conflicting information can be reconciled using data validation and reconciliation, and the STAN-software offers basic reconciliation functionality that is suitable for many MFA application.

== Examples of applications on different spatial and temporal scales ==
MFA studies are conducted on various spatial and temporal scales and for a variety of elements, substances, and goods. They cover a wide range of process chains and material cycles. Several examples:

- MFA on a national or regional scale (also referred to as material flow accounting): In this type of study, the material exchanges between an economy and the natural environment are analyzed. Several indicators are calculated in order to assess the level of resource intensity of the system.
- Corporate material flow analysis, or MFA along an industrial supply chain involves a number of companies: The goal of material flow analysis within a company is to quantify and then optimize the production processes so that materials and energy are used more efficiently manner, e.g., by recycling and waste reduction. Companies can use the results obtained by Material Flow Cost Accounting to reduce their operational costs and improve environmental performance.
- In the life cycle of a product: The life cycle inventory, whose compilation is at the core of life cycle assessment, follows the MFA methodology as it is based on an explicit system definition and process balances.

== Historical development ==
- Mass balance or the conservation of matter has been postulated already in ancient Greece, and it was introduced into modern chemistry by Antoine Lavoisier (cf. chapter 2.1.3 in Brunner&Rechberger,), from where it found its way to chemical engineering and finally to environmental science.
- Other seminal contributions were made by Sanctorius and Theodor Weyl.
- Dennis Meadows made a wide audience aware of the physical foundation of the economy when he co-authored the bestseller Limits to Growth in 1971. Meadows et al. based their predictions on an analysis of resource stocks; see in the glossary of environmental science.
- The methodology of MFA was developed during the 1980s and 1990s. Development happened simultaneously in different research groups. Central publications on the MFA methodology include Baccini and Bader (1996), Brunner and Rechberger (2004), Baccini and Brunner (2012), and van der Voet et al. (2002).
- Friedrich Schmidt-Bleek, who worked at the Wuppertal Institute, developed the MFA-related concept of Material Input Per Service unit (MIPS).
- Stefan Bringezu specified this concept in economy-wide material flow analysis, as screening tool for product life-cycle assessment within a cross-scale framework. He defined indicators such as Total Material Requirement (formerly Total Material Input) and Raw Material Input, which are used to quantify the Material Footprint of products, infrastructures and countries.
- The UNEP Resource Panel was set up in 2007 by the United Nations Environment Program. In analogy to the Intergovernmental Panel on Climate Change (IPCC) it brings together experts from many disciplines and institutions to review the current state of research on societal metabolism and to communicate the latest findings to policymakers and stakeholders.

=== Recent development ===
- MFA concepts have been or are being incorporated in national accounts in several countries and regions such as the EU and Japan. MFA is also used in the System of Integrated Environmental and Economic Accounting.
- Several international conferences or other meetings provide a platform for researchers and policymakers to meet and exchange results and ideas, including the World Resources Forum, a bi-annual international conference on material flow analysis and sustainable development.
- Waste Input-Output (WIO)-MFA is an approach designed to establish a comprehensive MFA system for the entire economy. This is achieved by utilizing monetary Input-Output (IO) tables and incorporating physical information related to material inputs. The method seamlessly integrates MFA with Input-Output models, offering a straightforward means to transform monetary flows within an Input-Output table into distinct physical flows categorized by materials. WIO-MFA serves as an illustrative example of MFA based on economic Input-Output analysis.
- The Sustainable Europe Research Institute (SERI) in Vienna, Austria, has developed a database called material flows.net.
- Dynamic MFA aims for long-term quantification of MFA systems and uses historic development patterns of physical stocks and flows to create robust scenarios for the years and decades to come.
- The MaTrace model, a variant of dynamic Material Flow Analysis (MFA), is designed to track the trajectory of materials through time and across different products within open-loop recycling systems. This model explicitly accounts for losses and the quality of scrap materials. MaTrace focuses on monitoring the journey of materials initially present in a final product, such as a passenger car. This tracking spans various life stages, including End-of-Life (EoL) processing, which involves collection, disassembling/demolition, and sorting/separation into scraps. Following this, there are metallurgical processes like remelting and/or smelting, where scraps are transformed into secondary materials. The materials then undergo fabrication into products, extending beyond passenger cars. Finally, the model considers the accumulation of these materials as stocks, with losses occurring at each transformation and use phase.
- Japan has developed into a hotspot for MFA research. The country has scarce mineral resources and therefore depends on imports of energy carriers, ores, and other raw materials. The Japanese government fosters research on material cycles and also inaugurated the 3-R concept.

== Conducting a state-of-the-art MFA ==
A state-of-the-art MFA consists of the following steps:

- Establish an explicit system definition: Specify the system boundary with geographical and temporal scope, processes (can contain stocks), and flows. Specify the material for which the system is to be quantified (product, substance, or indicator element). Make sure that each stock is associated with a process and that each flow connects one process to another. Flows can also begin or end outside the system boundary.
- Define and name the system variables. The system variables include: All stocks within the processes, all flows between processes, and all flows coming from outside or going to outside the system boundaries. Sometimes, stocks are not considered and only the net stock changes are of interest. For each variable, it must be clear whether it is a stock or a flow, and this distinction needs to be reflected in the names and in the mathematical symbols chosen.
- Quantify the system variables by linking them to literature, measurement, or modelled data.
- Perform a mass balance check for all processes and the system as a whole.
- Optional: Visualise your system by using the box-and-arrow scheme shown above or by using Sankey diagrams.
- Document the MFA by reporting the explicit system definition along with the list of quantified system variables and the mass balance checks.

=== The difference between material and substance flow analysis ===
While the term 'substance' in 'substance flow analysis (SFA) always refers to chemical substances, the term 'material' in 'material flow analysis (MFA)' has a much wider scope. According to Brunner and Rechberger the term 'material' comprises substances AND goods, and the reason for this wide scope is the wish to apply MFA not only to chemical elements or substances but also to materials like steel, timber, or products like cars or buildings. It is thus possible to conduct an MFA for the passenger vehicle fleet by recording the vehicles entering and leaving the use phase.

== Relation to other methods ==
MFA is complementary to the other core industrial ecology methods life cycle assessment (LCA) and input-output (IO) models. Some overlaps between the different methods exist as they all share the system approach and to some extent the mass balance principle. The methods mainly differ in purpose, scope, and data requirements.

MFA studies often cover the entire cycle (mining, production, manufacturing, use, waste handling) of a certain substance within a given geographical boundary and time frame. Material stocks are explicit in MFA, which makes this method suitable for studies involving resource scarcity and recycling from old scrap. The common use of time series (dynamic modelling) and lifetime models makes MFA a suitable tool for assessing long-term trends in material use.

- Compared to IO analyses, the number of processes considered in MFA systems is usually much lower. On the other hand, mass balance ensures that flows of by-products or waste are not overlooked in MFA studies, whereas in IO tables these flows are often not included due to their lack of economic value. Physical IO models are much less common than economic tables. However, WIO-MFA makes it possible to transform monetary flows within an IO table into distinct physical flows categorized by materials, including the flow of byproducts and waste (refer to the section above for details on WIO-MFA). Material stocks are not covered by IO analysis, only the addition to stock can be included in form of capital accumulation.
- Life cycle inventories record the demand for many different materials associated with individual products, whereas MFA studies typically focus on a single material used in many different products.

== See also ==
- Anthropogenic metabolism
- Energy accounting
- Industrial ecology
- Industrial metabolism
- Material criticality
- Material flow accounting
- Organigraph
- Social metabolism
- Sankey diagram
- Sustainability
- Urban metabolism
