= Paul H. Brunner =

American professor

- Occupation: Professor emeritus
- Known for: Material flow analysis

Paul H. Brunner (born 1946) is a material flow analysis methodology and urban metabolism specialist. He is a professor emeritus of the Institute for Water Quality, Resource and Waste Management, Vienna University of Technology in Austria.

== Biography ==
Dr. Brunner held the Chair for Waste Management at the Vienna University of Technology from 1991 to 2015, and specialized in waste and resource management. His research focused on the "metabolism of the anthroposphere", in particular on methods to analyze, evaluate and control material flows through urban regions.

On April 21, 2016 Prof. Paul H. Brunner was awarded the "Grand Decoration of Honour in Silver for Services to the Republic of Austria" by Minister Dr. Reinhold Mitterlehner.

== Literature ==
=== Books ===
- 2016. Handbook of Material Flow Analysis: For Environmental, Resource and Waste Engineers, 2nd ed., CRC Press, with Helmut Rechberger
- 2012. Metabolism of the Anthroposphere: Analysis, Evaluation, Design, with Peter Baccini, 2nd ed., MIT Press, Cambridge, Mass. ISBN 978-0262016650
- 2005. Integrated Resource and Waste Management (Advanced Methods in Resource & Waste Management), CRC Press, with Helmut Rechberger.
- 2004. Practical Handbook of Material Flow Analysis, with Helmut Rechberger, CRC Press LLC, Boca Raton, Florida. ISBN 1-5667-0604-1
- 1991. Metabolism of the Anthroposphere, with Peter Baccini, Springer Verlag, Berlin, Heidelberg, New York, London. ISBN 3-540-53778-3
