= Transfer of energy =

Transfer of energy may refer to:

- Energy transformation, also known as energy conversion, is the process of changing energy from one form to another.
- Heat transfer, the exchange of thermal energy via conduction, convection and radiation
- Collision, an event in which two or more bodies exert forces on each other over a relatively short time
- Wireless power transfer, the transmission of electrical energy from a power source to an electrical load, without the use of man-made conductors
- Transfer of energy from one place to another:
  - Electric power transmission, the bulk movement of electrical energy from a power plant to an electrical substation
  - District heating, a system for distributing heat generated in a centralized location for residential and commercial space heating and water heating
