= Domestic material consumption =

Domestic material consumption is a measurement of the total amount of material directly used in an economy, excluding hidden flows. DMC equals DMI minus exports (in economy wide material flow accounting).
