= Dynamic stock modelling =

Dynamic stock modelling (DSM) is a new development in material flow accounting and explicitly considers the role of in-use stocks in past, present, and future material use.

== For resource use ==
In-use stocks of buildings, infrastructure, and (durable) products play several important roles in social metabolism:

- They supply physical services such as transportation or shelter to people.
- They are 'capital containers' and 'resource repositories' representing large accumulations of fixed capital and materials; for example, steel and concrete in buildings.
- They are 'dynamics determiners'; their lifetime determines replacement flows and when new technologies can penetrate the market.
- They are 'wealth watchers' and can serve as an indicator of the amount of services utilized within a given socio-economic system.
- They are 'consumption couplers' because their technical properties determine the energy and material throughput required to operate them.
- They are 'city shapers' as the location and density of buildings determines transport patterns and other parameters of the urban fabric.

Dynamic stock modelling (DSM) explicitly considers these different roles of in-use stocks. DSM has a long tradition in modelling population and fixed capital; over the last twenty years, applications for product and material stocks have been developed. Age-cohort-based models, state-of-the-art in DSM, are of a descriptive nature: Each age-cohort is assigned an expected lifetime and the cohort's use phase ends when its lifetime elapses. At any given point in time, in-use stocks are composed of different age-cohorts, each with its specific material content and energy efficiency. In DSM, the assumed total stock size is determined by exogenously specified parameters such as population and per capita service level and the age-cohort lifetime model can be used to adjust the inflows into and the outflows from stocks.

== Further applications ==
DSM is the basis for many other types of modelling; examples include integrated assessment models, system dynamics models, population balance models, and dynamic material flow accounting (MFA) models. The latter are an important manner in which the material and technological detail of MFA is enhanced. DSM of materials additionally allows for the modelling of the end-of-life product flow which is the sum of all discarded products leaving the use phase according to the lifetime distribution chosen. This enables forecasting of waste volume and recycling potential and provides essential information for resource and energy use reduction strategies. The connection between dynamic DSM and waste input-output (IO) models, a special IO model type designed for handling waste, is currently under development and will allow for simultaneous assessment of environmental impacts of material production and recycling.
