= ISO 14051 =

ISO 14051 is part of the ISO 14000 family of standards relating to environmental management codified by the International Organization for Standardization. The purpose of ISO 14051:2011 is to provide principles and generic guidelines on material flow cost accounting. The norm seeks to provide a universally recognized paradigm for practitioners and companies employing material flow cost accounting. It is not intended for third parties certification.

== Introduction ==
ISO 14051 was published as a standard in 2011. It covers the implementation of material flow cost accounting (MFCA). In MFCA energy can be accounted as part of the cost of flow of materials or separated. Many organizations are unaware of the real cost of loss of materials due to incomplete recording in traditional cost accounting. This norm aims to fulfill a gap providing a tool to use an integrate accounting perspective that helps to reduce environmental impact and financial costs.

== Scope ==
ISO 14051:2011 provides general framework for the implementation of material flow cost accounting in small, medium and big organizations. In MFCA flow and inventories of materials are measured in physical amounts (i.e. mass, volume, liters, etc.) and the costs related with these flows are also taken into account and assessed. ISO 14051 is a tool of environmental management accounting and it provides information for internal use.

MFCA can be extended to other organizations in the supply chain, both upstream and downstream, thus helping to develop an integrated approach to improving material and energy efficiency in the supply chain. This extension can be beneficial because waste generation in an organization is often driven by the nature or quality of materials provided by a supplier, or the specification of the product requested by a customer.

== Cost estimation under ISO 14051:2011 ==
MFCA are estimated three kind of costs: (1) Material cost (2) System cost (3) Waste management cost.

Energy costs can be added to material costs or be quantified separately. Material, energy and system costs are assigned to cost centers outputs differentiating clearly which percentage belongs to final product and which percentage belongs to waste. The normative highlights the importance of a proper assignation criteria. Some criteria mentioned are number of hours of machine work, production, number of employees, number of hours of employees work, number of tasks completed, etc. in the estimation is needed to consider produce that is an output for a cost center but an input for another as well as internally recycled material.

== Difference between MFCA and traditional cost accounting ==
Before the implementation of this particular ISO it is helpful to understand the difference with the traditional cost accounting. MFCA makes a record of material flow in physical and monetary terms and puts emphasis in the loss of materials (or in other words, the waste produced). Although traditional cost accounting recognizes loss of materials, waste management costs are not separated but integrated in the total cost of production. This practice makes difficult to identify easily and clearly which part of production is due to losses or waste generation.

MFCA highlights waste management costs and inefficiency of processes therefore making easier to identify room for improvements. Many losses produce environmental impact (air pollution, water pollution, health problems, etc.) therefore identifying losses, the framework aims to make easier to also reduce some environmental impacts. It is worth saying that this framework does not identify environmental impact that is not linked with any material cost.

== Sources ==
- Jasch, C. (2003). The use of Environmental Management Accounting (EMA) for identifying environmental costs. Journal of Cleaner Production, 11(6), 667–676. doi:10.1016/S0959-6526(02)00107-5
- Schaltegger, S., & Burritt, R. (2000). Contemporary Environmental Accounting: Issues, Concepts and Practice. Sheffield, UK: Greenleaf Publishing Limited.
