= Industrial metabolism =

Concept describing the material and energy turnover of industrial systems

Industrial metabolism is a concept to describe the material and energy turnover of industrial systems. It was proposed by Robert Ayres in analogy to the biological metabolism as "the whole integrated collection of physical processes that convert raw materials and energy, plus labour, into finished products and wastes..." In analogy to the biological concept of metabolism, which is used to describe the whole of chemical reactions in, for example, a cell to maintain its functions and reproduce itself, the concept of industrial metabolism describes the chemical reactions, transport processes, and manufacturing activities in industry.

Industrial metabolism presupposes a connection between different industrial activities by seeing them as part of a larger system, such as a material cycle or the supply chain of a commodity. System scientists, for example in industrial ecology, use the concept as paradigm to study the flow of materials or energy through the industrial system in order to better understand supply chains, the sources and causes of emissions, and the linkages between the industrial and the wider socio-technological system.

Industrial metabolism is a subsystem of the anthropogenic or socioeconomic metabolism, which also comprises non-industrial human activities in households or the public sector.

== See also ==
- Anthropogenic metabolism
- Autopoiesis
- Dematerialization (economics)
- Energy accounting
- Industrial ecology
- Material flow accounting
- Material flow analysis
- Information metabolism
- Social metabolism
- Urban metabolism
