= Dematerialization (economics) =

Dematerialization is a term in economics and the social sciences that describes the process of making more goods with less material. The term itself possesses multi-accentuality, which allows it to be diversely explained by different fields of social science, such as Mainstream economics, which puts focus on the aspects of technological evolution and market demand shifts, and Ecological economics, which emphasizes the effect of dematerialization on the natural environment.

In economics, dematerialization refers to the absolute or relative reduction in the quantity of materials required to serve economic functions in society. In common terms, dematerialization means doing more with less. This concept is similar to ephemeralization as proposed by Buckminster Fuller.

== Origin ==
Dematerialization is a phenomenon occurs simultaneously with technological advancement, especially in the Third Industrial revolution products. Miniaturization and optimization of products are enabled by the improvement of wafer fabrication and battery production. Internet supported the digitalization of products (Online newspaper, Media Streaming, eBook). Servitization of products is due to the Industrial transformation in developed economies, from retailing to rental services.

In 1972, the Club of Rome in its report The Limits to Growth predicted a steadily increasing demand for material as both economies and populations grew. The report predicted that continually increasing resource demand would eventually lead to an abrupt economic collapse. Studies on material use and economic growth show instead that society is gaining the same economic growth with much less physical material required. Between 1977 and 2001, the amount of material required to meet all needs of Americans fell from 1.18 trillion pounds to 1.08 trillion pounds, even though the country's population increased by 55 million people. Al Gore similarly noted in 1999 that since 1949, while the economy tripled, the weight of goods produced did not change.

By most measures, quality of life improved from 1977 to 2001. While consumer demand is constantly increasing, consumers demand services such as communication, heating and housing, and not the raw materials needed to provide these. As a result, there is incentives to provide these with less materials. Copper wire has been replaced with fiber-optics, vinyl records with MP3 players while cars, refrigerators and numerous other items have gotten lighter.

The three essential ways to dematerialize a product
	Meaning	Examples
Optimize	Reducing the product mass	Reduction of mobile phone weight
Digitize	Change into digital products	Paper → Laptop, eBook
Servitize	Sell the product as a service	Mass production → Customization Bicycle selling → Rental bicycle

== Explanations ==
=== Mainstream economics ===
Digital economist Andrew McAfee noted that the two fundamental forces that cause Dematerialization are: thriving Capitalism and technological progression. The technologically advanced products enable the improvement of living standards while consuming fewer natural resources. In the late 18th century, the Industrial Revolution can be seen as the peak of human raw material consumption due to capitalism's expansion. Since then, the progression of technology started to prompt the disuse of obsolete products. As the demand for advanced products increased, the outdated products supply decreased. The economy grows simultaneously with the reduction of material quantity requirements, causing a cycle of "More from less." The three consequences of dematerialization according to Andrew McAfee:

1. Enhancement of human living standards as well as the natural environment. Poverty is decreasing, as is the rate of child mortality. Knowledge, education, food, and sanitation are spreading rapidly.
2. When more production is produced by fewer factories, capital concentrates over time. Capitalism and technological progress are combining to allow us to achieve more with less, but this also implies that more profits are going to fewer people.
3. The decline in the quantity of interpersonal interactions and bonds over time. There are numerous reasons for the reduction of social capital. One of them has to do with concentration: as farms and factories close, the work connections that they created wither.

=== Ecological studies ===
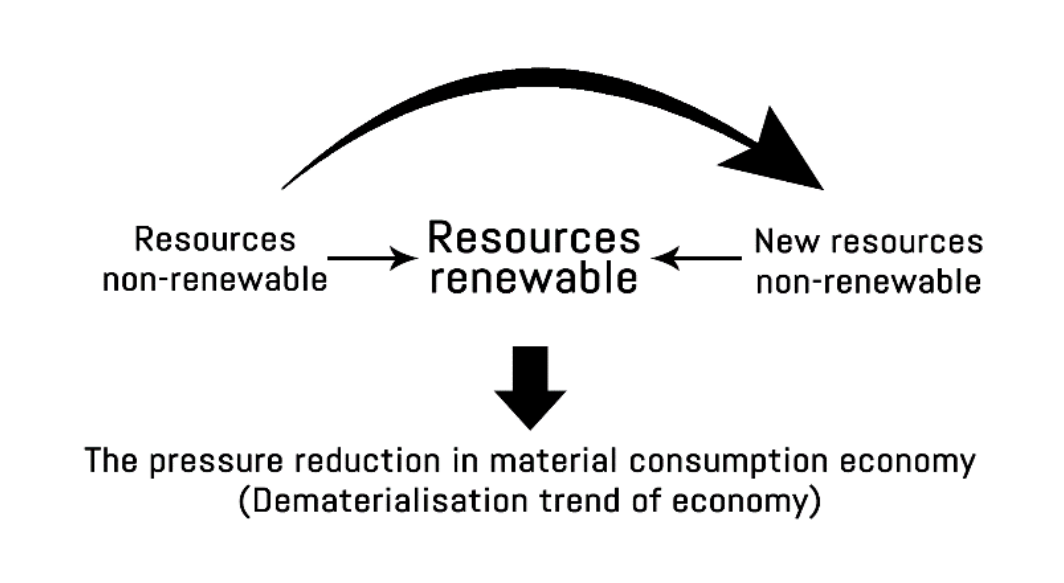
The Dematerialization route

In terms of ecological research, dematerialization is the improvement of social metabolism. Unlike traditional environmental protection measures, it facilitates a market and industrial transition from non-renewable to renewable resources, which might fundamentally alleviate environmental challenges. Word processing software, for example, can take the place of paper notes, reducing the demand and supply of non-renewable paper pulp, and slow down the process of deforestation. Dematerialization, on the other hand, is frequently hampered by the issue of reproduction rate. Renewable items will lose their price competitiveness in the market if their reproduction rate cannot exceed that of non-renewable products. Thus, Ecologists mostly suggest for government incentives for renewable energy development.

== Dematerialized Industries ==
=== Agriculture ===
Since the 1970s, crop tonnage has quadrupled in the United States, and the agricultural region has fallen from 472 million to 390 million hectares by the 2010s. The environmental footprint of livestock production in the United States has been lowered as a result of productivity advances in animal agriculture. In Europe, Latin America, and East Asia, similar losses in acreage have been observed, accompanied by huge gains in productivity.

=== Logging ===
The majority of industrialized economies are now in the midst of a "forest transition," in which governments are reclaiming forest land. Forestry has improved in efficiency, and wood consumption has decreased. Electronic wording applications have replaced paper, and ships and structures are no longer made of wood. Since the 1960s, the global use of wood for fuel and building has decreased dramatically, and the imprint of human activity on the planet has shrunk.

=== Mineral Industry ===
Steel had virtually no competition in 1900 for many of the exacting, durable, or heavy-duty applications for which it had been developed. With large-scale production of aluminium and its alloys, as well as reliance on other metals for some critical applications, this has changed a century later. Titanium has been used in alloys with aluminium because it is 45 percent less dense than steel but has a 20 percent lower ultimate tensile strength.

Mineral usage is likewise dropping in the United States. Steel usage has decreased by 15%, aluminum consumption by 30%, and copper consumption has decreased by 40% in the United States since the late twentieth century, according to the US Geological Survey. Cars now weigh 30% less than they did in the early 1960s, while aluminum soda cans are six times lighter than they were then. By using reinforced concrete, steel framing, and stronger and lighter glass, the consumption of cement, stone, sand, and gravel in construction has been minimized. For more than a decade, the US has maintained a steady level of energy consumption. Similar trends may be seen in the UK, which began lowering its raw material usage in 2001 and 2003.

== Criticisms ==
There is not much evidence that industries around the world are under dematerialization. The international extraction of six minerals (bauxite, the platinum group, magnesium, cobalt, molybdenum and nickel) and the production of cement grew faster than GDP from 1960 to 2019. Although GDP growth and technological advancement maintains a decent rate, the market demand of non-renewable materials didn't fall. A reason why we are not seeing a global dematerialization but a regional one is because advanced economies outsourced the production of material-intensive goods to the developing countries.

Despite society's best efforts at recycling and dematerialization, primary metal production is expected to rise in the future due to rising global demand for consumer goods. Like other industrial sectors, the mining, mineral processing, and metal production sector is under increasing pressure to reduce the amount of energy it consumes and the amount of greenhouse gases it emits. Because of the growing population and huge unmet demand for steel in low- and middle-income countries in Asia, Latin America, and Africa, there is no immediate prospect of global dematerialization: there may be temporary declines, but global steel consumption will continue to grow in the long run. At the same time, relative dematerialization will continue, allowing societies to derive more value and enjoy higher living standards with decreasing steel inputs.

While we may be using fewer materials, we are still consuming raw materials. In the United States, for example, except for aluminium, the use of metals has decreased significantly over the last century, whereas the use of paper and plastics has increased. According to the same study, the US is replacing less dense materials like timber and steel with aluminium and plastics. The vast majority of research appears to suggest that any potential for the world to become greener and cleaner through dematerialization is conditional on our ability to make this practise universal. To put it another way, when we stop using a material, it appears that we are simply replacing old, less dense materials with new, less dense materials.

== See also ==
- Anthropogenic metabolism
- Balance of nature
- Circular economy
- Ecological economics
- Ecological footprint
- Energy crisis
- Energy economics
- Energy returned on energy invested
- Global hectare
- Industrial metabolism
- Land (economics)
- Material flow analysis
- Metabolic rift
- Natural resource economics
- Social metabolism
- Urban metabolism
- Water use
