= Energy accounting =

Analysis of power consumption

Energy accounting is a system used to measure, analyze and report the energy consumption of different activities on a regular basis. This is done to improve energy efficiency, and to monitor the environment impact of energy consumption.

== Energy management ==
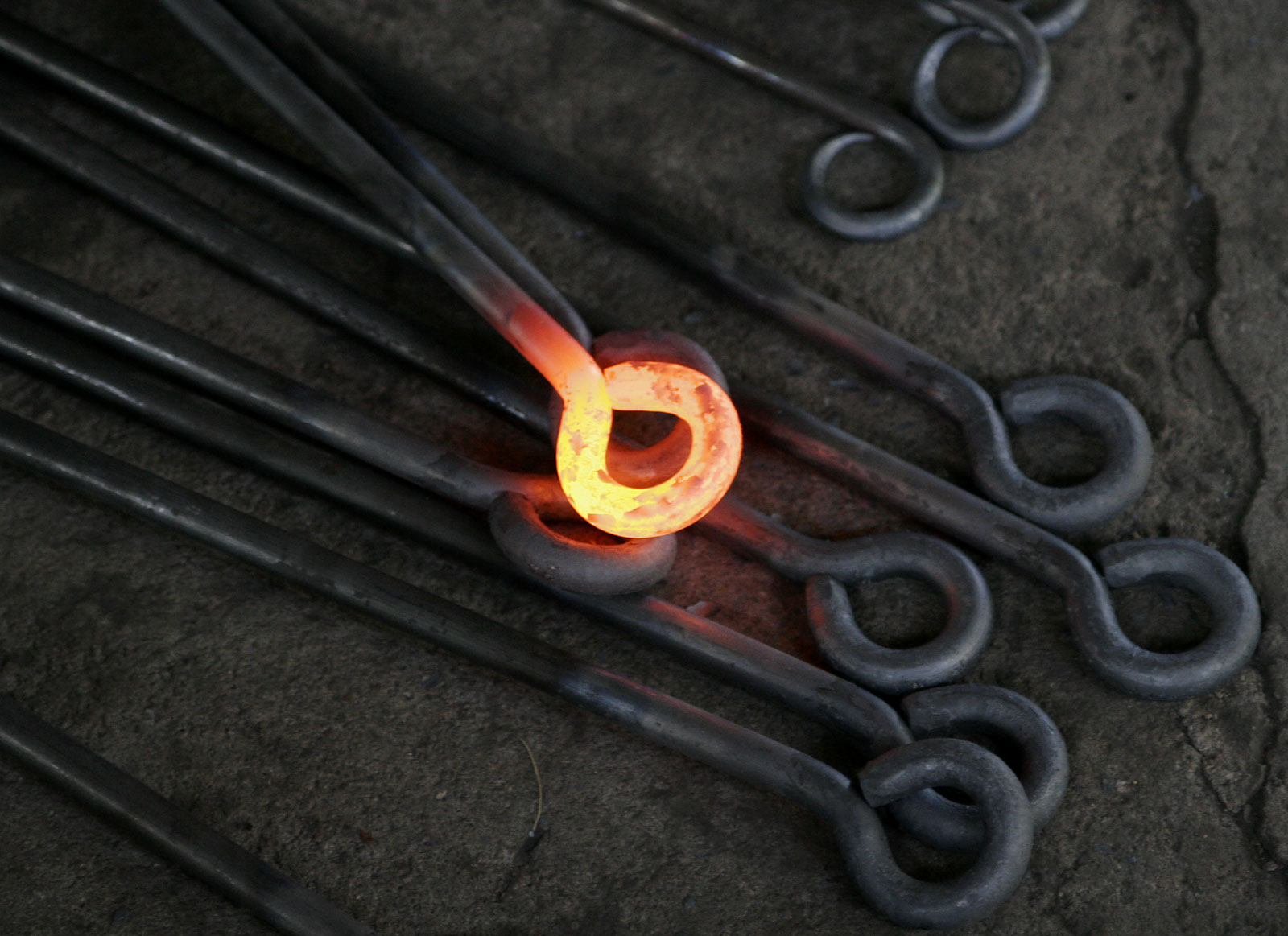
Thermal energy is the amount of random molecular kinetic energy.

Energy accounting is a system used in energy management systems to measure and analyze energy consumption to improve energy efficiency within an organization. Organisations such as Intel corporation use these systems to track energy usage.

Various energy transformations are possible. An energy balance can be used to track energy through a system. This becomes a useful tool for determining resource use and environmental impacts. How much energy is needed at each point in a system is measured, as well as the form of that energy. An accounting system keeps track of energy in, energy out, and non-useful energy versus work done, and transformations within a system. Sometimes, non-useful work is what is often responsible for environmental problems.

== Energy balance ==
Energy returned on energy invested (EROEI) is the ratio of energy delivered by an energy technology to the energy invested to set up the technology.

== See also ==
- Anthropogenic metabolism
- Frederick Soddy
- Energy and Environment
- Energy management
- Energy management software
- Energy management system
- Energy quality
- Energy transformation
- EROEI
- Industrial metabolism
- Social metabolism
- Technical Alliance
- Technocracy movement
- Urban metabolism
