= Material flow cost accounting =

Material flow cost accounting (MFCA) is a management tool that assists organizations in better understanding the potential environmental and financial consequences of their material and energy practices and seeks to improve them via changes in those practices. It does so by assessing the physical material flows in a company or a supply chain and assign adequate associated costs to these flows.

== History ==
The method was developed in Germany in the 1980s and is related to approaches such as eco balances, flow cost accounting and "Reststoffkostenrechnung".

The method became a huge success in Japan in the 2000s. By the year 2010 up to 300 companies had applied the MFCA approach, which was highly supported by the Japanese government.

In 2011 the International Organization for Standardization (ISO) published a norm on MFCA (i.e. EN ISO 14051:2011). In 2020 an analysis of 73 case studies was made about the experiences companies have made when applying MFCA including success factors and obstacles.

== Objective and principles ==
The aim of MFCA is to enhance both environmental and economic performance through improved material and energy use. Since 2011 a general framework for MFCA has been provided by the ISO 14051 norm. In order to improve material and energy efficiency MFCA aims to:

- Increasing transparency regarding material and energy flows and the respective costs
- Supporting organizational decisions in areas such as process engineering, production planning, quality control, product design and supply chain management
- Improving coordination and communication on material and energy use within organizations.

== See also ==
- Business process reengineering
- Sustainable design
