= Organigraph =

An organigraph is a graphical representation of a company's structure or processes. It is used as an alternative to a traditional organizational chart as it does not imply the same degree of linear hierarchy that an organizational chart does.

Organigraphs are used to expose critical associations and competitive opportunities as opposed to viewing all parties, departments, and business units as separate entities. They also can reveal relationships between departments, products, supply chains, and more within an organization that might not otherwise be apparent. Business strategists, consultants, and academics use organigraphs.

Around the year 2000, Henry Mintzberg and Ludo Van der Heyden conceived the organigraph.

Organigraphs can be created as diagrams or as images which represent the nature of the firm. For example, a computer company's organigraph could be in the form of a computer. The hard drive could represent employees, the power supply could relate to its financing, and the web browser could indicate the firm's strategy.

== See also ==
- Ecosystem
- Industrial ecology
