= Material flow =

Material flow (or "materials flow") is the description of the transportation of raw materials, pre-fabricates, parts, components, integrated objects and final products as a flow of entities. The term applies mainly to advanced modeling of supply chain management and its use has been largely subsumed under this heading.

As industrial material flow can easily become very complex, several different specialized simulation tools have been developed for complex systems. Typical tools include:

- AnyLogic
- AutoMod for logistics systems
- Plant Simulation for production system.
