= Urban metabolism =

Model of the flows of materials and energy in cities

Urban metabolism (UM) is a model to facilitate the description and analysis of the flows of the materials and energy within cities, such as undertaken in a material flow analysis of a city. It provides researchers with a metaphorical framework to study the interactions of natural and human systems in specific regions. From the beginning, researchers have adjusted the parameters of urban metabolism models.

C. Kennedy and fellow researchers have produced a clear definition in the 2007 paper The Changing Metabolism of Cities claiming that urban metabolism is "the sum total of the technical and socio-economic process that occur in cities, resulting in growth, production of energy and elimination of waste." With the growing concern of climate change and atmospheric degradation, the use of the urban metabolism model has become a key element in determining and maintaining sustainability and health in cities around the world. Urban metabolism provides a unified or holistic viewpoint to encompass all of the activities of a city in a single model.

== History ==
Sociologists have noted that the works of Karl Marx and collaborator Friedrich Engels include early discussions pertaining to the concept of urban metabolism, though before the term was adopted. Marx and Engels often focused on the social organization of the harvesting of the Earth's materials by "analysing the dynamic internal relationships between humans and nature." Marx even used the metaphor of metabolism to refer to the actual metabolic interactions that take place through humans' exertion of physical labour to cultivate the Earth for sustenance and shelter. They also used metabolism to describe the material and energy exchange between nature and society in as a critique of industrialization which they argued created an interdependent set of societal needs brought into play through the concrete organization of human labour.

Later, in reaction against industrialization and coal use, Sir Patrick Geddes, a Scottish biologist, undertook an ecological critique of urbanization in 1885, making him the first scientist to attempt an empirical description of societal metabolism on a macroeconomic scale. Through his experimental study of urbanization he established a physical budget for urban energy and material throughput by way of an input output table.

"Geddes' table consisted of the sources of energy and materials transformed into products in three stages: (1) extraction of fuels and raw materials; (2) the manufacture and transport; and (3) exchange. The table also included intermediary products used for manufacture or transport of the final products; calculation of energy losses between each of the three stages; and the resultant final product; which was often surprisingly small, in material terms, compared with its overall material inputs."

It wasn't until 1965 when Abel Wolman fully developed and used the term urban metabolism in his work, "The Metabolism of Cities," which he developed in response to deteriorating air and water qualities in American cities. In this study Wolman developed a model which allowed him to determine the inflow and outflow rates of a hypothetical American City with a population of 1 million people. The model allows the monitoring and documentation of natural resources used (mainly water) and the consequential creation and out-put of waste. Wolman's study highlighted the fact that there are physical limitations to the natural resources we use on a day-to-day basis and with frequent use, the compilation of waste can and will create problems. It also helped focus researchers and professionals of their time to focus their attention on the system wide impacts of consumption of goods and sequential production of waste within the urban environment.

Working off of Wolman's pioneering work in the 60s, environmentalist Herbert Girardet (1996) began to see and document his findings in the connection between urban metabolism and sustainable cities. Girardet laid the foundation for the industrial ecology approach to urban metabolism in which it is seen as the "conversion of nature into society." Aside from being a great advocate and populariser for urban metabolism, Girardet significantly coined and drew the difference between a 'circular' and 'linear' metabolism. In a circular cycle, there is nearly no waste and almost everything is re-used. Girardet characterizes this as a natural world process. On the other hand, a 'linear' metabolism which is characterized as an urban world process has a clear resource in-put and waste out-put. Girardet emphasizes that the accelerated use of linear metabolisms in urban environments is creating an impending global crisis as cities grow.

More recently, the metabolism frame of reference has been used in the reporting of environmental information in Australia, where researchers such as Newman have begun to link urban metabolic measures to, and it has been suggested that it can be used to define the sustainability of a city within the ecosystems capacity that can support it. This research has stayed mainly at a descriptive level and did not reach into the political or social forces of urban form and stages of flow. From this research there has been a strong theme in present literature on urban sustainability is that of the need to view the urban system as a whole if we are to best understand and solve the complex problems.

== Two main schools of approach ==
=== The energy method ===
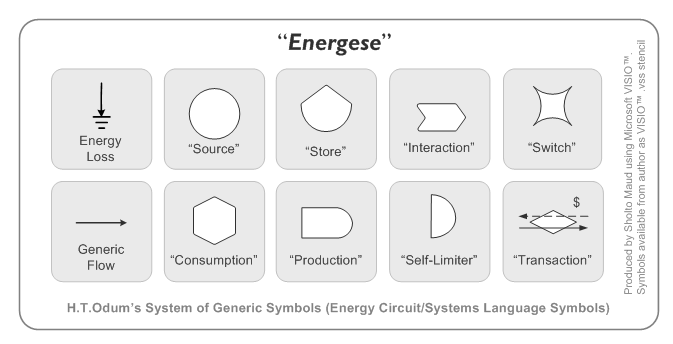

Developed in 1970s Howard T. Odum, a systems ecologist, wanted to emphasize the dependence on the source of almost all energy on the planet: the sun. Odum believed that previous research and development on urban metabolism was missing and did not account for qualitative differences of mass or energy flows. Odum's study took this into count and he coined the term "emergy" to track and account for the metabolic flows by measuring the solar energy used directly or indirectly to make a product or deliver a service. This method also emphasizes the use of a standard unit of measurement to calculate energy, nutrient and waste movement in the biophysical system; the unit chosen was "solar equivalent joules" (sej). At first glance, the notion to use standard units seems like a beneficial idea for calculating and comparing figures; in reality the ability to convert all urban processes into solar energy joules has proven to be a difficult feat, and difficult to understand.

=== Material flow analysis ===
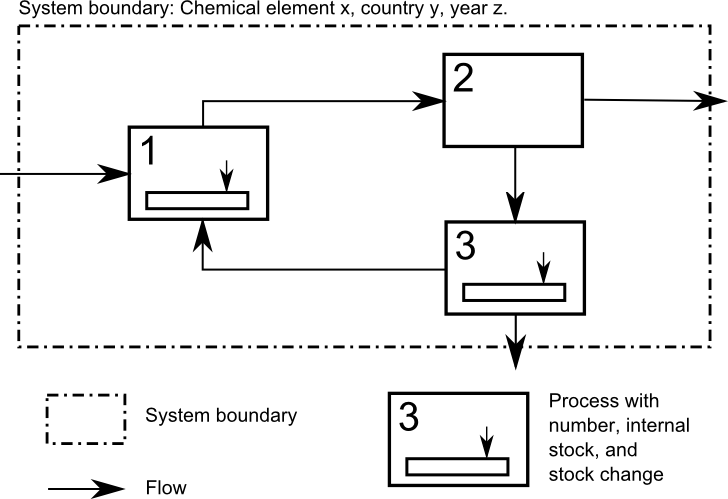
Simple example of material flow analysis diagram

The UM approach has been applied several times to assess and describe urban flows and impacts related to them, using different tools such as Material Flow Analysis (MFA).

MFA, researched by Baccini and Brunner in the 1990s, "measures the materials flowing into a system, the stocks and flows within it, and the resulting outputs from the system to other systems in the form of pollution, waste, or exports." Much like Wolmans case model for a hypothetical American City, this method is based on the concept that the mass of the resources used will equal the mass "plus" stock changes out. The MFA technique has become the mainstream school of urban metabolism because it uses more practical units that the public, workers, government officials and researchers can understand.

== Applications ==
There are four main uses of urban metabolism that are used by urban planners and designers: sustainability reporting, urban greenhouse gas accounting, mathematical modelling for policy analysis and urban design.

=== Sustainability indicators ===

One of the uses of Urban Metabolism is to track and record levels of sustainability in cities and regions. Urban metabolism collects information about energy efficiency, material cycling, waste management and infrastructure in urban environments. The urban metabolism model records and analyzes environmental conditions and trends which can be understood by policy makers and consequently comparable over time making it easier to find unhealthy patterns and develop a plan of action to improve sustainability.

=== Greenhouse gas accounting ===

Staying in line with the notion of sustainability, urban metabolism is also a helpful for tracking greenhouse gas emissions (GHG) on a city or regional level. As mentioned above, with the proliferation of linear metabolisms such as cars, the production of greenhouse gases has increased exponentially since the birth and mass production of the automobile, causing a problem for the atmosphere. Urban metabolism measures levels of greenhouse gas because it is an output or waste product that is produced through human consumption. The model provides quantifiable parameters which allow officials to mark unhealthy levels of GHG emissions and develop a plan of action to lower them.

=== Mathematical models ===
Aside from accounting applications, scholars have begun to develop mathematical models to quantify and predict levels of particles and nutrients within the urban metabolism model. Such models are mostly used in MFA analysis and are helpful in determining present and future sub-processes and material stocks and flows within the urban environment With the ability to predict future levels, the models allow progress to be made and possible pollution prevention programs to be instated rather than end-of-the-pipe solutions which have been favoured in the past.

=== Design tools ===
Through use of the three applications above, scholars and professionals are able to use urban metabolism as a design tool to create greener and more sustainable infrastructure from the beginning. By tracing flows of energy, materials and waste through urban systems as a whole, changes and alterations can be made to close the loops to create circular metabolisms where resources are recycled and almost no waste is produced. Such initiatives are being made around the world with technology and inventions which make building green easier and accessible.

Uses of the model are, however, not restricted to strictly functional analysis, as the model has been adapted to examine the relational aspects of urban relationships between infrastructure and citizens.

== See also ==
- Anthropogenic metabolism
- Dematerialization (economics)
- Industrial ecology
- Industrial metabolism
- Social metabolism
- MuSIASEM
- Urban ecology
