= Anthropogenic metabolism =

Material and energy turnover of human society

Industrial ecology as steward of tools of analysis for resource consumption.

Anthropogenic metabolism, also referred to as metabolism of the anthroposphere, is a term used in industrial ecology, material flow analysis, and waste management to describe the material and energy turnover of human society. It emerges from the application of systems thinking to the industrial and other man-made activities and it is a central concept of sustainable development. In modern societies, the bulk of anthropogenic (man-made) material flows are related to one of the following activities: sanitation, transportation, habitation, and communication, which were "of little metabolic significance in prehistoric times". Global man-made stocks of steel in buildings, infrastructure, and vehicles, for example, amount to about 25 Gigatonnes (more than three tonnes per person), a figure that is surpassed only by construction materials such as concrete. Sustainable development is closely linked to the design of a sustainable anthropogenic metabolism, which will entail substantial changes in the energy and material turnover of the different human activities. Anthropogenic metabolism can be seen as synonymous to social or socioeconomic metabolism. It comprises both industrial metabolism and urban metabolism.

== Negative effects ==
In layman's terms, anthropogenic metabolism indicates the human impact on the world by the modern industrialized world. Much of these impacts include waste management, ecological footprints, water footprints, and flow analysis (i.e., the rate at which each human depleted the energy around them). Most anthropogenic metabolism happens in developed countries. According to Rosales, "Economic growth is at present the main cause of increased climate change, and climate change is a main mechanism of biodiversity loss; because of this, economic growth is a major catalyst of biodiversity loss."

A water footprint is the amount of water that each person uses in their daily lives. Most of the world's water is salt water which cannot be used in human food or water supplies. Therefore, the freshwater sources that were once plentiful are now being diminished due to anthropogenic metabolism of the growing population. The water footprint encompasses how much fresh water is needed for each consumer's needs. According to J. Allan, "there is a huge impact of water use on stores of surface and groundwater and on flows to which water is returned after use. These impacts are shown to be particularly high for manufacturing industries. For example, that there are less than 10 economies worldwide that have a significant water surplus, but that these economies have successfully met, or have the potential to meet, the water deficits of the other 190 economies. Consumers enjoy the delusion of food and water security provided by virtual water trade.

In addition, the ecological footprint is a more economical and land-focused way of looking at human impact. Developed countries tend to have higher ecological footprints, which do not strictly correspond to a country's total population. According to research by Dias de Oliveira, Vaughan and Rykiel, "The Ecological Footprint...is an accounting tool based on two fundamental concepts, sustainability and carrying capacity. It makes it possible to estimate the resource consumption and waste assimilation requirements of a defined human population or economy sector in terms of corresponding productive land area."

One of the major cycles that humans can contribute to that cause a major impact on climate change is the nitrogen cycle. This comes from nitrogen fertilizers that humans use. Gruber and Galloway have researched, "The massive acceleration of the nitrogen cycle caused by the production and industrial use of artificial nitrogen fertilizers worldwide has led to a range of environmental problems. Most important is how the availability of nitrogen will affect the capacity of Earth's biosphere to continue absorbing carbon from the atmosphere and to thereby continue helping to mitigate climate change."

The carbon cycle is another major contributor to climate change primarily from anthropogenic metabolism. A couple examples of how humans contribute to the carbon in the atmosphere is by burning fossil fuels and deforestation. By taking a close look at the carbon cycle Peng, Thomas and Tian have discovered that, "It is recognized that human activities, such as fossil fuel burning, land-use change, and forest harvesting at a large scale, have resulted in the increase of greenhouse gases in the atmosphere since the onset of the Industrial Revolution. The increasing amounts of greenhouse gases, particularly CO_{2} in the atmosphere, is believed to have induced climate change and global warming."

Impact of climate change extend beyond humans. There is a forecast for extinctions of species because of their habitats being affected. An example of this is marine animals. There are major impacts on the marine systems as a result of anthropogenic metabolism, according to Blaustein, the dramatic findings indicate that "every square kilometer [is] affected by some anthropogenic driver of ecological change".

The negative effects of anthropogenic metabolism are seen through the water footprint, ecological footprint, carbon cycle, and the nitrogen cycle. Studies on the marine ecosystem that show major impacts by humans and developed countries which include more industries, thus more anthropogenic metabolism.

== See also ==
- Dematerialization (economics)
- Industrial metabolism – Concept describing the material and energy turnover of industrial systems
- Social metabolism – Study of materials and energy flows between nature and society
- Urban metabolism – Model of the flows of materials and energy in cities
- Information metabolism – Psychological theory of interaction between biological organisms and their environment
- Earth's energy budget – Concept for energy flows to and from Earth
- World energy supply and consumption – Global production and usage of energy
- Noosphere – Philosophical concept of biosphere successor via humankind's rational activities
- Technosphere – Part of the environment that is affected by humans
- Collective consciousness – Shared beliefs and ideas in society
- Syndemic – Concept in epidemiology
