= Met =

Met, MET, The Met or The MET may refer to:

== Buildings ==
=== Arts venues ===
- Metropolitan Museum of Art, or the Met, in New York City
- Manhattan Ensemble Theatre, or MET, in New York City
- Metropolitan Opera, or the Met, in New York City
- Metropolitan Opera House (disambiguation), various buildings
- The Met (arts centre) in Bury, Greater Manchester
- Manila Metropolitan Theater in Manila, Philippines
- The Met Theater, Los Angeles, now Eastwood Performing Arts Center

=== Sports venues ===
- Met Center in Bloomington, Minnesota
- Met Park in Norfolk, Virginia
- MetLife Stadium in East Rutherford, New Jersey
- Metropolitan Stadium in Bloomington, Minnesota

=== Other buildings ===
- Metropolitan Bible Church ("The MET"), Ottawa, Canada
- Metropolitan Building (Minneapolis), until 1961
- Metropolitan Miami (development), Florida, US
- Metropolitan Theatre (Winnipeg), Canada
- The Met (skyscraper), Bangkok, Thailand

== Arts, entertainment, and media ==
- Met, a fictitious character in Mega Man (v-game) series
- Met 107, a radio station in Bangkok
- Mind's Eye Theatre, a live-action role-playing game
- The Met: Policing London, BBC documentary series

== Business ==
- MetLife, insurance provider
- Metropolitan Stores, former Canadian chain
- Met Foods, American grocery store group
- MET Group, a Hungarian-Swiss energy company
- Eurofins MET Labs, a Nationally Recognized Testing Laboratory.

== Education ==
- Budapest Metropolitan University, formerly Budapest College of Communication and Business
- Manchester Metropolitan University, England, UK
- Michigan English Test, U.S./British language exam
- Muslim Educational Trust

== Meteorological agencies ==
- Met Éireann, Ireland
- Met Office, UK

== Policing ==
- Metropolitan Police Service of London, UK

== Science, technology, and mathematics ==
=== Biology and medicine ===
- Mesenchymal–epithelial transition
- MET (gene), encoding hepatocyte growth factor receptor
- Met, hypermethioninemia
- Microbial electrochemical technologies

==== Chemical species ====
- Methionine, amino acid abbreviated as Met, or M
- Methylethyltryptamine, hallucinogen

==== Patient-focused terms ====
- Metabolic equivalent of task, the physical intensity of an activity
- Motivational enhancement therapy
- Muscle energy technique, clinical neuromuscular protocol

=== Space missions ===
- Mission Elapsed Time, a method of timekeeping during space missions
- Modular Equipment Transporter (Apollo program), lunar handcart

=== Other science and technology, and mathematics ===
- Met, the category of metric spaces having metric maps
- Met, a unit of human metabolic rate used in thermal comfort and building engineering, equal to the heat production of a seated person at rest.
- MET Matrix, materials, energy, and toxic emissions
- Missing transverse energy in particle physics
- Microwave electrothermal thruster, a form of electric spacecraft propulsion
- The Metallurgical Laboratory, a precursor to Argonne National Laboratory during the Manhattan Project

== Transportation ==
- Nash Metropolitan automobile
- London Underground:
  - Metropolitan line
  - Metropolitan Railway, originating company
- Metropolitan Electric Tramways, tram company in London
- Metropolitan Transit Authority of Black Hawk County in Waterloo, Iowa, United States
- Modesto and Empire Traction Company, a shortline railroad
- Metropolitan Transit Authority (Victoria), colloquially known as The Met, the former metropolitan public transport marketing agency for Melbourne, Australia
- Metropolitan West Side Elevated Railroad, one of the predecessors of the Chicago "L" system
- Metropark station, Iselin, New Jersey, US; Amtrak code MET
- Montreal Metropolitan Airport (YHU) abbreviated "MET", St-Hubert, Longueuil, Quebec, Canada; serving Montreal

== Other uses ==
- Mediterranean Editors and Translators association
- Middle European Time or Central European Time
- A member of the New York Mets professional baseball team
- An abbreviation of metronome

== See also ==
- Mets (disambiguation)
