= Primetime Emmy Award for Outstanding Technical Direction and Camerawork for a Special =

Television award category

Primetime Emmy Award for Technical Direction and Camerawork for a Special
- Awarded for: Outstanding Technical Direction and Camerawork for a Special
- Country: United States
- Presented by: Academy of Television Arts & Sciences
- Currently held by: The Apple Music Super Bowl LX Halftime Show Starring Bad Bunny (2026)
- Website: emmys.com

The Primetime Emmy Award for Outstanding Technical Direction and Camerawork for a Special is awarded to one television special each year.

In the following list, the first titles listed in gold are the winners; those not in gold are nominees, which are listed in alphabetical order. The years given are those in which the ceremonies took place.

== Winners and nominees ==
=== 1970s ===
Year	Program	Nominee(s)	Network
1978	Outstanding Achievement in Coverage of Special Events - Individuals (Note: As a juried award, nominees had to garner 50% approval to win the award. The nominee did not meet the benchmark and no award was given.)		
1978	The 29th Annual Emmy Awards	William W. Landers	NBC
1978	Outstanding Achievement in Any Area of Technical Crafts (Note: As a juried award, nominees had to garner 50% approval to win the award. The nominee did not meet the benchmark and no award was given.)		
1978	Live from Lincoln Center	Mark Schubin	PBS

=== 1980s ===
Year	Program	Nominee(s)	Network
1980	Outstanding Individual Achievement - Special Class (Note: As a juried award, nominees had to garner 50% approval to win the award. The nominees did not meet the benchmark and no award was given.)		
1980	Skinflint: A Country Christmas Carol	Reed Howard, William Landers, O. Tamburri, Victoria Walker	NBC
1983
1983	Special Bulletin	Hank Geving	NBC
1983	The Member of the Wedding (An NBC Live Theater Presentation)	Les Atkinson, George Falardeau, Tom Geren, Roy Holm, Karl Messerschmidt, Mike Stramisky	NBC
1983	Motown 25: Yesterday, Today, Forever	Greg Cook, Gene Crowe, Tom Geren, Larry Heider, Robert Keys, Dave Levisohn, Wayne Orr, Ken Patterson, Ron Sheldon	NBC
1983	Rocky Mountain Holiday with John Denver and The Muppets	John B. Field, John King, Dave Levisohn	ABC
1983	Sheena Easton... Act One	Gene Crowe, Joe Epperson, Larry Heider, Roy Holm, Roy Ratliff, Gene Schwartz, Ron Sheldon	NBC
1984
1984	The Magic of David Copperfield VI: Floating Over the Grand Canyon	Les Atkinson, Bruce Bottone, George Falardeau, Lou Fusari, Dean Hall, Dave Hilmer, Roy Holm, David Nowell, Jerry Smith	CBS
1984	The American Music Awards	Ralph Alcocer, John Allen, Evan Baker, Dave Banks, Bruce Bonnett, Ron Brooks, Ernie Buttelman, D.J. Diomedes, Bob Greenseth, Dale Walsh, Carol Wetovich, Blair White	ABC
1984	Bob Hope's USO Christmas in Beirut	Bill Church, Steve Deaver, George Falardeau, Dave Levisohn, Bill Philbin, Hector Ramirez, Mark Sanford	NBC
1984	Lynda Carter, Body and Soul	Bruce Bottone, George Falardeau, Tom Geren, Larry Heider, Jim Herring, Karl Messerschmidt, Jerry Smith, Mike Stramisky	CBS
1984	Mister Roberts (NBC Live Theater)	Les Atkinson, George Falardeau, Jim Herring, Mike Higuera, Karl Messerschmidt, Jerry Smith	NBC
1985
1985	The Magic of David Copperfield VII: Familiares	Les Atkinson, Louis Fusari, Jim Herring, Mike Higuera, Roy Holm, Dave Levisohn, Dana Martin, Jerry Smith, Mike Stramisky	CBS
1985	The Kennedy Center Honors: A Celebration of the Performing Arts	Gene Crowe, Tom Geren, Kevin Hayes, Larry Heider, Bob Keys, Jay Millard, Wayne Orr, Bill Philbin, Jim Scurti, Ron Sheldon, Keith Winikoff	CBS
1985	Motown Returns to the Apollo	Juan Berrera, Gene Crowe, Brett Francis, Tom Geren, Larry Heider, Bob Keys, Marvin McLinn, Luis Rojas, Ron Sheldon, Keith Winikoff	NBC
1985	Solid Gold Salutes the Songs of Summer	Richard Browning, Jack Chisholm, Ray Connors, Greg Cook, Rocky Danielson, Frank Geraty, John Gillis, Bruce Oldham, Dick Watson, George Wood	Syndicated
1986
1986	Neil Diamond... Hello Again	Toby Brown, Edward Chaney, Gene Crowe, Mike Denney, Larry Heider, Pat Kenney, Bob Keys, Dave Levisohn, Wayne Orr, John Palacio, Hector Ramirez, Ron Sheldon, Harry Tatarian	CBS
1986	The 58th Annual Academy Awards	Ralph Alcocer, John Allen, Evan Baker, Dave Banks, Ron Brooks, Ernie Buttleman, Warren Cress, Hugo Di Lonardo, D.J. Diomedes, Sal Folino, Bob Greenseth, Bud Holland, Art LaCombe, Don Langford, Averill Perry, Bill Pope, Jim Ralston, Larry Stenman, Joe Talosi, Blair White	ABC
1986	The American Music Awards 1986	Ralph Alcocer, John Allen, Evan Baker, Dave Banks, Ron Brooks, Warren Cress, Hugo Di Lonardo, D.J. Diomedes, Sal Folino, Gary Larkins, Jim Ralston, Dale Walsh, Blair White	ABC
1986	The Magic of David Copperfield... In China	David Hennings, Dave Levisohn, Hector Ramirez, Keith Winikoff	CBS
1987
1987	Barbara Mandrell's Christmas: A Family Reunion	Les Atkinson, Roy Holm, Dana Martin, Karl Messerschmidt, J. O'Neill, Jerry Smith	CBS
1987	American Music Awards '87	Ralph Alcocer, Evan Baker, Ron Brooks, Warren Cress, Hugo Di Lonardo, D.J. Diomedes, Sal Folino, Don Langford, Jim Ralston, Dale Walsh, Blair White	ABC
1987	Happy Birthday, Hollywood	Ralph Alcocer, Evan Baker, Ron Brooks, Warren Cress, Hugo Di Lonardo, D.J. Diomedes, Sal Folino, Don Langford, Jim Ralston, Dale Walsh, Blair White	ABC
1987	Liberty Weekend: Closing Ceremonies	Ralph Alcocer, Dave Banks, Ron Brooks, Warren Cress, D.J. Diomedes, Sal Folino, Tom Geren, Larry Heider, Dave Hilmer, Bob Keys, Don Langford, Dave Levisohn, John Monteleon, Wayne Orr, Jim Ralston, Jim Scurti, Ron Sheldon, Larry Stenman	ABC
1988
1988	Julie Andrews... The Sound of Christmas	David "Rocket" Barber, Gunter Degn, Bob Keys, Ron Sheldon, Mike Spencer	ABC
1988	An Evening of Comedy with Jimmie Walker and Friends	Dave Banks, Paul Basta, Dean Hall, Robert G. Holmes, Larry Huchingson, Dave Owens, Irv Waitsman	Showtime
1988	The Kennedy Center Honors: A Celebration of the Performing Arts	Gene Crowe, John B. Field, Tom Geren, Kevin Hayes, Larry Heider, Bob Keys, Dave Levisohn, Jay Millard, Wayne Orr, Bill Philbin, Ron Sheldon, Keith Winikoff	CBS
1988	The Magic of David Copperfield X: The Bermuda Triangle	Dave Levisohn, Bill Philbin, Hector Ramirez, Keith Winikoff	CBS
1988	We the People 200: The Constitutional Gala	John Burdick, Ed Crosby, Gene Crowe, Larry Heider, Bob Keys, Wayne Orr, Hector Ramirez, Fred Roth, Ron Sheldon, Keith Winikoff	CBS
1989
1989	The Meeting (American Playhouse)	Ron Graft, Greg Harms, Kenneth Patterson, Richard Price, Mark Sanford	PBS
1989	Gregory Hines: Tap Dance in America (Dance in America: Great Performances)	Larry Heider, Charlie Huntley, Mike Lieberman, Jake Ostroff, Dave Satin, Ron Washburn	PBS
1989	A Raisin in the Sun (American Playhouse)	Greg Cook, Ron Graft, Gregory Harms, Kenneth Patterson, Mark Sanford	PBS
1989	Il Trovatore (The Metropolitan Opera Presents)	William Akerlund, Juan Barrera, Manny Gutierrez, Jay Millard, Frank O'Connell, Jake Ostroff, Paul Ranieri, David A. Smith, Ron Washburn	PBS

=== 1990s ===
Year	Program	Nominee(s)	Network
1990
1990	The Magic of David Copperfield XII: The Niagara Falls Challenge	Dave Banks, Gary Childs, Sam Drummy, Hank Geving, Dean Hall, Dave Levisohn, Bill Philben, Hector Ramirez, Keith Winikoff	CBS
1990	Our Town (Great Performances)	Juan Barrera, John Feher, Susan Noll, John O'Connell, Alain Onesto, Ron Washburn	PBS
1990	Sammy Davis Jr.'s 60th Anniversary Celebration	Dave Banks, Diane Biederbeck, John B. Field, Dean Hall, Larry Heider, Dave Hilmer, Dave Levisohn, Bill Philben, Hector Ramirez, Keith Winikoff	ABC
1990	Time Warner Presents "The Earth Day Special"	Ted Ashton, Gene Crowe, Tom Geren, Larry Heider, Ron Sheldon, Keith Winikoff	ABC
1990	Wolf Trap Presents Victor Borge: An 80th Birthday Celebration	Win Bernfeld, John Feher, Bill Greenback, Helene Haviland, Susan Noll, Donna Quante, Charles Reilly, David Smith, James Yockey	PBS
1991
1991	The Magic of David Copperfield XIII: Mystery on the Orient Express	Sam Drummy, Dave Levisohn, Bill Philbin, Hector Ramirez, Keith Winikoff	CBS
1991	The 63rd Annual Academy Awards	Ralph Alcocer, Ron Brooks, Warren Cress, D.J. Diomedes, Sal Folino, Bud Holland, Barry Kirstein, Don Langford, John Monteleon, Ed Payne, Averill Perry, Chuck Pharis, Bill Pope, Ed Rajme, Jim Ralston, Larry Stenman, Dale Walsh, Blair White	ABC
1991	Carnegie Hall: Live at 100	William Akerlund, Miguel Armstrong, Jill Bowers, Jim Covello, John Feher, Manny Gutierrez, Michael Jarocki, Michael Lieberman, Jay Millard, Frank O'Connell, David A. Smith, Ron Smith, Larry Solomon, Billy Steinberg	PBS
1991	Sinbad: Brain Damaged	John Burdick, Gene Crowe, Larry Heider, Charlie Huntley, Ken Patterson, Donna Quante, Ron Smith, Keith Winikoff	HBO
1991	Welcome Home Heroes with Whitney Houston	Sam Drummy, Ed Fussell, Tom Geren, Pat Gleason, Jim Goldsmith, Larry Heider, Charlie Huntley, Dave Levisohn, Rick McVicar, Ken Patterson, Bill Philbin, David Plakos, Joe Puthoff, Hector Ramirez, Mark Sanford, Ron Sheldon, Roz Storey	HBO
1992
1992	Paul Simon's Concert in Central Park	Sam Drummy, John Feher, John B. Field, Tom Geren, Jim Goldsmith, Manny Gutierrez, Charlie Huntley, Dave Levisohn, Mike Lieberman, Bob Mikkelson, Jake Ostroff, Hector Ramirez, Manny Rodriguez, Mark Sanford, George Schaafsma, Ron Sheldon, Bill Sullivan, Ron Washburn, Keith Winikoff	HBO
1992	Comic Relief V	Ted Ashton, John B. Field, Tom Geren, Larry Heider, Dave Levisohn, Bill Philbin, Hector Ramirez, Keith Winikoff	HBO
1992	Sinbad and Friends — All the Way Live... Almost!	Steve Berry, Gene Crowe, Larry Heider, Dave Hilmer, Ken Patterson, Bill Philbin, Donna Quante, Mark Sanford, Vince Singletary	ABC
1993
1993	The Magic of David Copperfield XV: Fires of Passion	David Eastwood, Skip Eppley, Neal Gallagher, Hank Geving, Scott McClain, Ken Patterson, Hector Ramirez, Gordie Saiger, Mark Sanford, Tom Vannozzi, Keith Winikoff	CBS
1993	An American Reunion: The People's Inaugural Celebration	Terry Donohue, Pat Gleason, Manny Gutierrez, Tom Hildreth, Ray Hoover, Charlie Huntley, Paul Klekotta, Mike Lieberman, Jake Ostroff, Roy Otake, Ken Patterson, Donna Quante, George C. Reilly, Manny Rodriguez	HBO
1993	John Williams: Live at the Hollywood Bowl	Jake Jacobs, Bud Keyes, John Lee, Tim Lewis, Gary Meeker, David Navarrette, John Pellechia, George Prince, John Tweden, Jim Velarde, Easter Xua	A&E
1993	Liza Minnelli: Live from Radio City Music Hall	John Burdick, Ken Dahlquist, Ed Fussell, Larry Heider, Ernie Jew, Dave Levisohn, Jay Millard, David Niles, Alain Onesto, Allan Wells	NPT
1993	Michael Jackson Talks... to Oprah — 90 Primetime Minutes with the King of Pop	Steve Bennett, Mike Culp, Bobby Dunn, Tom Geren, Steve Laxton, Allen Merriweather, Bob Minges, Rick Rice, Mark Sanford, Jeff Zachary	ABC
1994
1994	The 66th Annual Academy Awards	Ralph Alcocer, Ted Ashton, Dale Carlson, Tom Geren, Larry Heider, Bud Holland, David Irete, Dave Levisohn, Jean Mason, Jeff Mydock, Averill Perry, Chuck Pharis, Bill Philbin, David Plakos, Bill Pope, Jim Ralston, Hector Ramirez, Kenneth Shapiro, Larry Stenman, Blair White	ABC
1994	Billboards (Great Performances)	Juan Barrera, Alain Onesto, James "Mac" Privette, Ron Smith, Billy Steinberg, Ron Washburn	PBS
1994	Salute to the Newport Jazz Festival (In Performance at the White House)	William Barber, Barbara Byrne, Julius Fauntleroy, Jerry Gallagher, Nancy Gerstman, Todd Holme, Charlie Huntley, Charles Ide, Barry Alan Kessler, Ed Lee, Michael Peters	PBS
1995
1995	The Magic of David Copperfield XVI: Unexplained Forces	David Eastwood, Neal Gallagher, Bill Philbin, Hector Ramirez, Jim Scurti, Keith Winikoff	CBS
1995	Barbra Streisand: The Concert	Ted Ashton, Steve Berry, John Burdick, Gene Crowe, Ken Dahlquist, Sam Drummy, Larry Heider, Mark Hunter, Dave Levisohn, Hector Ramirez, Mark Sanford, Ron Sheldon, Vince Singletary	HBO
1995	Eagles: Hell Freezes Over	Sam Drummy, Dave Eastwood, John B. Field, Scoop Geren, Charlie Huntley, Bruce Oldham, Bill Philbin, David Plakos, Hector Ramirez, Mark Sanford, Ron Sheldon	MTV
1995	The Kennedy Center Honors	John Burdick, John B. Field, Charlie Huntley, Jay Millard, Bill Philbin, David Plakos, Hector Ramirez, Ron Sheldon, Chris Tafuri, Tim Walbert, Keith Winikoff	CBS
1995	Tibor Rudas Presents The Three Tenors in Concert 1994	Edgar De La Espriella, John B. Field, Tom Geren, Hank Geving, Dean Hall, Greg Harms, Larry Heider, Bob Keys, Dave Levisohn, Bruce Oldham, Wayne Orr, Bill Philbin, Hector Ramirez, Ron Sheldon, Thomas G. Tcimpidis, Kris Wilson, Keith Winikoff	PBS
1996
1996	Sinatra: 80 Years My Way	Ted Ashton, David Eastwood, John B. Field, Tom Geren, Larry Heider, Dave Levisohn, Bill Philbin, David Plakos, Hector Ramirez, Ron Sheldon, Thomas G. Tcimpidis, Kris Wilson, Keith Winikoff	ABC
1996	The 68th Annual Academy Awards	Ralph Alcocer, Ted Ashton, Steve Berry, Dale Carlson, David Eastwood, Tom Geren, Larry Heider, Dave Hilmer, David Irete, Dave Levisohn, Jean Mason, Jeff Mydock, Averill Perry, Bill Philbin, David Plakos, Bill Pope, Jim Ralston, Hector Ramirez, Mark Sanford, Blair White	ABC
1996	The 38th Annual Grammy Awards	Ted Ashton, David Eastwood, John B. Field, Tom Geren, Hank Geving, Dave Hilmer, Charlie Huntley, Mark LaCamera, Dave Levisohn, Bill Philbin, Hector Ramirez, Brian Reason, Andrew Sabol, Ron Sheldon, Keith Winikoff	CBS
1996	The Kennedy Center Honors	John Burdick, John B. Field, Charlie Huntley, Jay Millard, Lyn Noland, Bill Philbin, David Plakos, Hector Ramirez, Ron Sheldon, Chris Tafuri, Keith Winikoff	CBS
1997
1997	Disney's Beauty and the Beast: A Concert on Ice	Ted Ashton, Wayne Orr, John Palacio, Rick Robinson, Donna Stock	CBS
1997	Disney's The Hunchback of Notre Dame Festival of Fun Musical Spectacular	John Burdick, David Eastwood, John B. Field, Tom Geren, Larry Heider, Charlie Huntley, Dave Levisohn, John Palacio, Kenneth Patterson, David Plakos, Hector Ramirez, Manny Rodriguez, Mark Sanford, Ron Sheldon, Ron Smith	Disney Channel
1997	The Kennedy Center Honors	John Burdick, David Eastwood, John B. Field, Helene Haviland, Charlie Huntley, Jay Millard, Lyn Noland, Susan Noll, John Palacio, Bill Philbin, Hector Ramirez, Ron Sheldon, Chris Tafuri	CBS
1997	The Price Is Right 25th Anniversary Primetime Special	Cesar Cabreira, Wayne Getchell, David Hallmark, Allen Latter, Edward Nelson, Martin K. Wagner	CBS
1997	Puccini's "La Boheme" with the New York City Opera	Juan Barrera, Jim Covello, John Feher, Charlie Huntley, Emmett Loughran, Susan Noll, Manny Rodriguez, David A. Smith, Larry Solomon, Ron Washburn, Paul C. York	PBS
1998
1998	The Metropolitan Opera Presents Carmen	Miguel Armstrong, Juan Barrera, Jim Covello, John Feher, Manny Gutierrez, Emmett Loughran, Jake Ostroff, Paul Ranieri, David A. Smith, Billy Steinberg, Ron Washburn	PBS
1998	Garth: Live from Central Park	Rob Balton, Juan Barrera, Gary Childs, Rocky Danielson, Bobby Delrusso, Sam Drummy, Larry Heider, Robert L. Highton, Dave Hilmer, Mark Hryma, Marc Hunter, Charlie Huntley, Scott Johnson, Jay Kulick, Jeff Muhlstock, Lyn Noland, Wayne Orr, Ken Patterson, Bill Philbin, Hector Ramirez, Paul Ranieri, Manny Rodriguez, Mark Sanford, Ron Sheldon, Keith Winikoff	HBO
1998	The Kennedy Center Honors	John Burdick, John B. Field, Helene Haviland, Charlie Huntley, Jay Millard, Lyn Noland, Susan Noll, Bill Philbin, Hector Ramirez, Paul Ranieri, Manny Rodriguez, Ron Sheldon, Chris Tafuri	CBS
1999
1999	Janet: The Velvet Rope	Matthew Allwork, Ted Ashton, Rocky Danielson, Barrie Dodd, Sam Drummy, David Eastwood, Tom "Scoop" Geren, Ian Hembury, Jay Kulick, Kenneth Patterson, Bill Philbin, Phil Piotrowsky, David Plakos, James Ramsay, Matty Randazzo, Chuck Reilly, Ron Tufnell, Keith Winikoff	HBO
1999	The 71st Annual Academy Awards	Ted Ashton, Rob Balton, John Burdick, Rocky Danielson, Bob DelRusso, Sam Drummy, David Eastwood, Rick Edwards, John B. Field, Tom "Scoop" Geren, Hank Geving, Marc Hunter, Charlie Huntley, Dave Levisohn, Jean Mason, Lyn Noland, Wayne Orr, Rob Palmer, Kenneth Patterson, Bill Philbin, David Plakos, Hector Ramirez, Chuck Reilly, Manny Rodriguez, Mark Sanford, Ron Sheldon, Ron Smith, Chris Tafuri, Allan Wells, Mark Whitman, Keith Winikoff	ABC
1999	Christmas in Rockefeller Center	Michael Bennett, Steven Cimino, Joe DeBonis, Kurt Decker, Carl Eckett, Rick Fox, Frank Grisanti, Adam Keith, John Kosmaczewski, Cory Lieble, Jason Morgese, Jim Nassetta, Brian Phraner, Harvey Szajt	NBC
1999	Jerry Seinfeld: I'm Telling You for The Last Time	Rob Balton, David Eastwood, Tom "Scoop" Geren, Robert L. Highton, Charlie Huntley, Ernie Jew, Jay Kulick, Lyn Noland, Kenneth Patterson, Manny Rodriguez, Mark Sanford, Ron Washburn, Keith Winikoff	HBO
1999	1998 MTV Video Music Awards	David Eastwood, Tom "Scoop" Geren, Hank Geving, Charlie Huntley, Dave Levisohn, Jean Mason, John Meiklejohn, Bill Philbin, David Plakos, Hector Ramirez, Manny Rodriguez, Mark Sanford, Mark Whitman, Keith Winikoff	MTV

=== 2000s ===
Year	Program	Nominee(s)	Network
2000
2000	Fail Safe	Ted Ashton, Dave Chameides, Gene Crowe, Rocky Danielson, Sam Drummy, David Eastwood, Tom Geren, Hank Geving, Larry Heider, David Irete, Bob Keys, Dave Levisohn, John O'Brien, Wayne Orr, Bill Philbin, Hector Ramirez, Chuck Reilly, Dennis Turner, Easter Xua	CBS
2000	The 72nd Annual Academy Awards	Ted Ashton, Rob Balton, John Burdick, Rocky Danielson, Bob DelRusso, Sam Drummy, David Eastwood, Rick Edwards, John B. Field, Tom "Scoop" Geren, Hank Geving, Randy Gomez, Marc Hunter, Charlie Huntley, Dave Levisohn, Jean Mason, Jay Millard, Lyn Nolan, Wayne Orr, Rob Palmer, Ken Patterson, Bill Philbin, David Plakos, Hector Ramirez, Brian Reason, Chuck Reilly, Manny Rodriguez, Mark Sanford, Kenneth Shapiro, Allan Wells, Mark Whitman, Keith Winikoff	ABC
2000	Cher: Live in Concert — From the MGM Grand in Las Vegas	Ted Ashton, Alan Beal, Bill Chaikowsky, Rocky Danielson, Barrie Dodd, David Eastwood, Joe Epperson, Tom "Scoop" Geren, Charlie Huntley, Ken Patterson, David Plakos, Hector Ramirez, Chuck Reilly, Tad Scripter, Roz Storey, Ron Tufnell, Andy Watt, Keith Winikoff	HBO
2000	Chris Rock: Bigger and Blacker	Rayford Clark, Tom Geren, Randy Gomez, Manny Gutierrez, Helene Haviland, Edwin Horton, Alain Onesto, Doug Ramsey, Mark Renaudin, Mark Sanford	HBO
2000	Saturday Night Live: The 25th Anniversary Special	Michael Bennett, Steven Cimino, Carl Eckett, Eric A. Eisenstein, Frank Grisanti, Jan Kasoff, James Mott, Stephen Murello, Susan Noll, John Pinto	NBC
2001
2001	Barbra Streisand: Timeless	Ted Ashton, Bill Chaikowsky, Ken Dahlquist, Sam Drummy, David Eastwood, Tom Geren, Greg Harms, Larry Heider, John Palacio Sr., John Pritchett, Ron Sheldon, Tom Tcimpidis, Brad Zerbst	Fox
2001	The 73rd Annual Academy Awards	Ted Ashton, Rob Balton, John Burdick, Rocky Danielson, Sam Drummy, Dave Eastwood, Rick Edwards, John B. Field, Freddy Frederick, Tom Geren, Ray Hoover, Marc Hunter, Charlie Huntley, Dave Levisohn, Jean Mason, Lyn Noland, Rob Palmer, Ken Patterson, Bill Philbin, David Plakos, Hector Ramirez, Brian Reason, Chuck Reilly, Mark Sanford, Kenneth Shapiro, Ron Sheldon, Allan Wells, Mark Whitman, Kris Wilson, Keith Winikoff	ABC
2001	Bruce Springsteen & The E Street Band	Mark Chamberlain, Jeff Cribes, David Driscoll, Nat Heard, Dave Hulings, Charlie Huntley, Scott Lutton, James Miller, Marc Nathan, Michael O'Rourke, Alain Onesto, Barry Otto, Mark Renaudin, Mitchell Simchowitz, Pete Stendel, Phil Summers	HBO
2001	Super Bowl XXXV Halftime Show	Sol Bress, Kerri Brooks, Steve Cimino, Dave Eastwood, Beth Efroymson, George Graffeo, Charlie Huntley, John Kosmaczewski, Jay Kulick, Robert Lawton, Allen Merriweather, Janis Murray, John Pavlovich, Bill Philbin, Hector Ramirez, Deena Sheldon, Pete Stendel, Ron Tadano, Mark Whitman, Robert Wishnie, Jeffrey Zachary	CBS
2001	Survivor: The Reunion	Kevin Bailey, Joseph R. Bohman, John Curtin, David Dorsett, Jim Dray, Sam Drummy, Freddy Frederick, Wayne Getchell, David Hallmark, Larry Heider, Scha Jani, Bob Keys, Allen Latter, Les Nourse, Gordon T. Sweeney	CBS
2002
2002	Britney Spears Live from Las Vegas	Ted Ashton, Steven C. Berry, Bill Chaikowsky, Rocky Danielson, David Eastwood, Tom Geren, Bobby Highton, David Hilmer, Marc Hunter, Ernie Jew, Guy Jones, Jay Kulick, Dave Levisohn, Jay Millard, Jeff Muhlstock, Lyn Noland, Kenneth Patterson, Bill Philbin, David Plakos, Brian Reason, Chuck Reilly, Chris Rhodes, Jofre Rosero, Gordie Saiger, Mark Sanford, Steven Theodore, Mark Whitman, Keith Winikoff	HBO
2002	A&E in Concert: Sting in Tuscany ...All This Time	Riccardo Castellini, Luigi Dell'Elba, Fabrizio Frascadore, Luca Nonni, Matteo Passigato, Mark Sanford, Kenneth Shapiro, Filiberto Titone, Giovanni Tori	A&E
2002	The 74th Annual Academy Awards	Ted Ashton, Rob Balton, John Burdick, Rocky Danielson, Dave Eastwood, Rick Edwards, John B. Field, Freddy Frederick, Hank Geving, Tom Green, Ray Hoover, Marc Hunter, Charlie Huntley, Dave Levisohn, Jean Mason, Jay Millard, Lyn Noland, Rob Palmer, Ken Patterson, Bill Philbin, David Plakos, Hector Ramirez, Paul Ranieri, Brian Reason, Mark Sanford, Ron Sheldon, Alan Wells, Mark Whitman, Keith Winikoff	ABC
2002	America: A Tribute to Heroes	Rob Balton, Diane Biederbeck, Steven Cimino, Warren Forman, John Gillis, Randy Gomez, Chris Gray, Larry Heider, Charlie Huntley, Jay Kulick, Jeff Muhlstock, Steve Murello, Johnny Pinto, Matty Randazzo, John Repczynski, David Rudd, Kenneth Shapiro, Irvin Waitsman, Mark Whitman, Kris Wilson, Easter Xua	(Note: America: A Tribute to Heroes was simulcast live on 35 network and cable outlets. The Emmys listed no individual network with this nomination.)
2002	The Carol Burnett Show: "Show Stoppers"	Terry Clark, Hank Geving, David Hallmark, Ed Horton, Mark La Camera, Allen Latter, Thomas Luth	CBS
2003
2003	Cher — The Farewell Tour	Ted Ashton, Alan Beal, Rocky Danielson, Barrie Dodd, Dave Eastwood, Tom "Scoop" Geren, Pat Gleason, Guy Jones, Jay Kulick, Lyn Noland, Rob Palmer, Ken Patterson, Derek Pennell, David Plakos, Hector Ramirez, James Ramsay, Chuck Reilly, Jofre Rosero, Andy Watt, Danny Webb, Keith Winikoff	NBC
2003	The 75th Annual Academy Awards	Ted Ashton, Rob Balton, Ben Britten, John Burdick, Rocky Danielson, Tim Drnec, Dave Eastwood, Rick Edwards, John B. Field, Freddy Frederick, Tom Geren, Hank Geving, Marc Hunter, Charlie Huntley, Jean Mason, Jay Millard, Lyn Noland, John O'Brien, Scott Paider, Rob Palmer, Ken Patterson, Bill Philbin, David Plakos, Hector Ramirez, Brian Reason, Mark Sanford, Todd Semmes, Ron Sheldon, Holly Sorenson, Allan Wells, Mark Whitman, Keith Winikoff	ABC
2003	The 45th Annual Grammy Awards	Bruce Balton, Rob Balton, Mike Breece, John Burdick, Bob DelRusso, Dave Eastwood, Rick Edwards, John B. Field, Marc Hunter, Charlie Huntley, Ernie Jew, Jay Kulick, Dave Levisohn, Jay Millard, Lyn Noland, Hector Ramirez, Jim Scurti, Mike Shore, Ron Washburn, Allan Wells, Mark Whitman, Keith Winikoff	CBS
2003	Robin Williams: Live on Broadway	Ted Ashton, Rob Balton, Tom "Scoop" Geren, Bob Highton, Lyn Noland, Mark O'Herlihy, David Plakos, Paul Ranieri, Jofre Rosero, Mark Sanford, Jim Scurti, Mark Whitman, Keith Winikoff	HBO
2003	Rolling Stones — Licks World Tour, Live from Madison Square Garden	Ted Ashton, Rob Balton, Justin Bomberg, Adrian Brister, Simon Cadiz, Jim Covello, David Eastwood, Joe Favor, Tom "Scoop" Geren, Manny Gutierrez, Marc Hunter, Marty Kell, Dave Levisohn, Gabriel Lopez, Jay Millard, Jeff Muhlstock, Lyn Noland, Ken Patterson, Matty Randazzo, Brian Reason, Chuck Reilly, Jofre Rosero, Mark Sanford, Jim Scurti, David A. Smith, Aaron Stephenson, Ron Washburn, Mark Whitman, Keith Winikoff	HBO
2004
2004	A&E in Concert: Sting — Sacred Love	Bruce Green, Marc Greenfield, Mark Johnson, David Plakos, Greg Poschman, Hector Ramirez, Mark Sanford, Kenneth Shapiro, Dan Webb	A&E
2004	A&E in Concert: Paul McCartney in Red Square	Dusty Cardaropoli, Redo Jackson, Jim Johnston, Dane Mustola, Mike Sienkiewicz, Kevin Smith, Josh Worley	A&E
2004	The 76th Annual Academy Awards	Ted Ashton, Rob Balton, Mike Breece, John Burdick, Rocky Danielson, David Eastwood, Rick Edwards, John B. Field, Tom "Scoop" Geren, Hank Geving, Marc Hunter, Charlie Huntley, Dave Levisohn, Jean Mason, Jay Millard, Lyn Noland, Rob Palmer, Bill Philbin, David Plakos, Hector Ramirez, Brian Reason, Mark Sanford, Allan Wells, Mark Whitman, Keith Winikoff	ABC
2004	Late Night with Conan O'Brien 10th Anniversary Special	Gregory Aull, Rob Balton, Richard S. Carter, Kenneth Decker, Kurt Decker, Bob DelRusso, Carl M. Henry III, Eugene Huelsman, Chris Matott, John Meiklejohn, James Palczewski, John Pinto, Keith Winikoff	NBC
2004	VH1 Presents: 2004 Rock and Roll Hall of Fame Ceremony	Taylor Dees, Matt Dimakos, David Eastwood, Kent Green, Christian Hoagland, Charlie Huntley, Jay Kulick, John Meiklejohn, Lyn Noland, Bill Philbin, Chuck Reilly, Bob Richman, Mike Stodden, Mark Whitman	VH1
2005
2005	The Games of the XXVIII Olympiad — Opening Ceremony	Dave Adkins, Cody Alexander, Andrew Allman, Dean Andersen, Bob Basile, Dan Beard, Joe Carzoli, Steve Cozakos, Joe DeBonis, Rick Fox Jr., Mike Harvath, Terry Hester, Jerrold Hochman, Andy Italiano, Robert Jaeger, Steve Laxton, Richie Leible Jr., James Mansfield, David Manton, Brian Phraner, John Pinto, Rick Rice, Patrick John Rondou, Marc Tippy, Nick Utley, James Wachter, Harry Weisman, David Whitlock, Mike Wimberley, Ken Woo	NBC
2005	The 77th Annual Academy Awards	Ted Ashton, Rob Balton, John Burdick, Rocky Danielson, Dave Eastwood, Rick Edwards, John B. Field, Hank Geving, Tom Green, Marc Hunter, Charlie Huntley, Ervin D. Hurd, Dave Levisohn, Jean Mason, Jay Millard, Lyn Noland, Rob Palmer, Bill Philbin, David Plakos, Hector Ramirez, Brian Reason, Mark Sanford, Allan Wells, Mark Whitman, Kris Wilson, Keith Winikoff	ABC
2005	Eric Clapton Crossroads Guitar Festival (Great Performances)	Miguel Armstrong, Timm Bland, Barbara Drago, Freddy Frederick, Ed Fussell, Pat Gleason, Manny Gutierrez, Ray Hoover, Lyn Noland, Matty Randazzo, Chad Smith, Ron Smith, Billy Steinberg, Keith Winikoff	PBS
2005	Tsunami Aid: A Concert of Hope	Ted Ashton, Joe Bohman, Bob DelRusso, Marc Hunter, Charlie Huntley, Garrett Hurt, Dave Levisohn, Lyn Noland, Ken Patterson, Chuck Reilly, John Repczynski, Mark Sanford, Damien Tuffereau, Mark Whitman, Keith Winikoff	NBC
2005	2004 Video Music Awards	John Atkinson, Rob Balton, Eric Becker, Marc Bloomgarden, Danny Bonilla, John Burdick, Dave Eastwood, Warren Forman, Freddy Frederick, Tom Hildreth, Charlie Huntley, Jay Kulick, John Meiklejohn, Jeff Mydock, Lyn Noland, Rob Palmer, Brian Reason, Jofre Rosero, Billy Steinberg, Damien Tuffereau, Ron Washburn, Mark Whitman, Kris Wilson	MTV
2006
2006	The XX Olympic Winter Games — Opening Ceremony	Cody Alexander, Dan Beard, Joe DeBonis, Kenneth Decker, Eric A. Eisenstein, Rick Fox Jr., Sal Guarna, Mike Harvath, Terry Hester, Jerrold Hochman, Igor Klobas, Robert LaMacchia, Richie Leible Jr., Tore Livia, Jonathan Mantak, Chris Matott, Robert Mikkelson, John Murphy, Brian Phraner, John Pinto, Marc Tippy, Nick Utley, James Wachter, Harry Weisman, Mike Wimberley, Ken Woo	NBC
2006	The 78th Annual Academy Awards	Ted Ashton, Robert Balton, John Burdick, Brett Crutcher, David Eastwood, John B. Field, Aaron Fitzgerald, Dean Hall, Marc Hunter, Charlie Huntley, Dave Levisohn, Jay Millard, Lyn Noland, Rob Palmer, Bill Philbin, David Plakos, Hector Ramirez, Brian Reason, Chuck Reilly, Mark Sanford, Kenneth Shapiro, Allan Wells, Mark Whitman, Kris Wilson, Keith Winikoff, Easter Xua	ABC
2006	Andrea Bocelli: Amore Under the Desert Sky (Great Performances)	Randy Baer, Bill Chaikowsky, Ken Dahlquist, Hank Geving, Manny Gutierrez, Larry Heider, Pat Kerby, Ken Patterson, Steve Rice, Gordie Saiger, Billy Steinberg, Rob Vuona, Daniel Webb, Allan Wells, Easter Xua	PBS
2006	Elton John: The Red Piano	Ted Ashton, Barrie Dodd, David Eastwood, Harry Skip Eppley, Paul Freeman, Tom Geren, Guy Jones, Chris Methven, Rob Palmer, Ken Patterson, Derek Pennell, David Plakos, Hector Ramirez, James Ramsay, Chuck Reilly, John Repczynski, Gordie Saiger, Andy Watt, Daniel Webb	NBC
2006	NFL Opening Kickoff 2006	Eric Becker, Bob DelRusso, Freddy Frederick, Pat Gleason, Charlie Huntley, Guy Jones, John Kosmaczewski, Jay Kulick, John Meiklejohn, Lyn Noland, Chuck Reilly, Mark Whitman, Easter Xua	NBC
2007
2007	American Idol: Idol Gives Back	John Pritchett, Damien Tuffereau, Suzanne Ebner, John Repczynski, George Prince, Easter Xua, Alex Hernandez, Dave Eastwood, Bobby Highton, Ray Gonzales, Vince Singletary, Bert Atkinson, Brian Reason, Ed Horton, Rick Edwards, Richard Strock, Rob Vuona, Mike Tribble, Hector Ramirez, Brad Zerbst, Garrett Hurt, Danny Bonilla, Dave Hilmer, Marc Hunter, Allen Merriweather, Mark Sanford	Fox
2007	The 79th Annual Academy Awards	John B. Field, Kenneth Shapiro, Mark Sanford, Keith Winikoff, Ted Ashton, Robert Balton, Danny Bonilla, John Burdick, David Eastwood, Marc Hunter, Charlie Huntley, Dave Levisohn, Lyn Noland, Rob Palmer, Bill Philbin, David Plakos, Hector Ramirez, Brian Reason, Mark Whitman, Kris Wilson, Brett Crutcher, Aaron Fitzgerald, Dean Hall, Easter Xua, Chuck Reilly, Allan Wells	ABC
2007	Comic Relief 2006	Keith Winikoff, Ted Ashton, Bill Chaikowsky, Dave Eastwood, Larry Heider, Dave Hilmer, Dave Levisohn, Ken Patterson, Bill Philbin, Hector Ramirez, Gordie Saiger, Mark Sanford	HBO
2007	Dane Cook: Vicious Circle	Keith Winikoff, Rob Balton, John Burdick, Bob DelRusso, Manny Gutierrez, Charlie Huntley, John Meiklejohn, Jay Millard, Lyn Noland, Mark Renaudin, Carlos Rios, Jofre Rosero, Jim Scurti, David A. Smith, Ron Washburn, Mark Whitman, Matty Randazzo, Bob Amour	HBO
2007	The 49th Annual Grammy Awards	John B. Field, Ted Ashton, Mike Breece, Dave Eastwood, Freddy Frederick, Hank Geving, Dean Hall, Larry Heider, Dave Hilmer, Ed Horton, Marc Hunter, Charlie Huntley, Dave Levisohn, Steve Martyniuk, Rob Palmer, Bill Philbin, Hector Ramirez, Brian Reason, Guy Jones, Keith Winikoff	CBS
2007	Prince Super Bowl XLI Halftime Show	Eric Becker, David Bernstein, Robert Balton, Danny Webb, Ray Hoover, John Burdick, Jofre Rosero, Mark Sanford, Rob Levy	CBS
2007	Tony Bennett: An American Classic	Terry Donohue, Sion Michel, Darin Moran, John Grillo, Thomas G. Tcimpidis, Nick Theodorakis	NBC
2008
2008	The 50th Annual Grammy Awards	John B. Field, Eric Becker, Mike Breece, David Eastwood, Freddy Frederick, Hank Geving, Dean Hall, Larry Heider, Dave Hilmer, Ed Horton, Marc Hunter, Charlie Huntley, Dave Levisohn, Steve Martyniuk, Rob Palmer, Bill Philbin, Hector Ramirez, Brian Reason, Ted Ashton, Keith Winikoff, Guy Jones	CBS
2008	The 80th Annual Academy Awards	John B. Field, Kenneth Shapiro, Allan Wells, Ted Ashton, Robert Balton, Danny Bonilla, John Burdick, David Eastwood, Marc Hunter, Charlie Huntley, Dave Levisohn, Lyn Noland, Rob Palmer, Bill Philbin, David Plakos, Hector Ramirez, Brian Reason, Mark Whitman, Kris Wilson, Easter Xua, Keith Dicker, Dean Hall, Steve Martyniuk, Mark Sanford, Keith Winikoff, Chuck Reilly	ABC
2008	American Idol: Idol Gives Back	Shiran Stotland, Eric Becker, David Eastwood, Marc Hunter, Bobby Highton, Brian Reason, Easter Xua, Danny Bonilla, George Prince, Ed Horton, John Repczynski, Suzanne Ebner, Diane Beiderbeck, William Chaikowsky, Alex Hernandez, Mark Sanford	Fox
2008	Hansel and Gretel (Great Performances at the Met)	Jon Pretnar, Miguel Armstrong, Bill Finley, Manny Gutierrez, Charlie Huntley, John Kosmaczewski, Alain Onesto, Tim Quigley, Mark Renaudin, David A. Smith, Larry Solomon, Jim Tufaro, Ron Washburn, Mark Whitman, Jeff Muhlstock, Claus Stuhlweissenburg, Billy Steinberg, Matty Randazzo, Paul Ranieri	PBS
2008	Justin Timberlake: FutureSex/Loveshow	Keith Winikoff, Ted Ashton, Rob Balton, John Burdick, Robert Del Russo, Manny Gutierrez, Ray Hoover, Gene Kelly, Tore Livia, Steve Martyniuk, John Meiklejohn, Jay Millard, Lyn Noland, Kenneth Patterson, Tim Quigley, Brian Reason, Mark Renaudin, Carlos Rios, Jim Scurti, Eli Clarke, Freddy Frederick, Jimmy Goldsmith, Helene Haviland, Jim Yockey, Rich York, John Kosmaczewski, Matty Randazzo, Paul Ranieri, Roy Otake	HBO
2009
2009	Beijing 2008 Olympic Games Opening Ceremony	Robert LaMacchia, Kris Castro, John Murphy, Ed Austin, David Adkins, Ken Cavali, Frank Grisanti, Cody Alexander, Jim Wachter, John Pinto, Tim O'Neill, Mike Harvath, James Mansfield, Nick Utley, Brian Phraner, Dan Beard, Rick Fox, Eric A. Eisenstein, Kevin Kellogg, Gary D'Amaro, Andy Italiano, Richard Leible Jr., Rick Rice, Kenny Woo, Mike Wimberley, Tore Livia, Joe DeBonis, Marc Tippy, Dave Manton, Jerry Hochman	NBC
2009	The 81st Annual Academy Awards	Rick Edwards, John Pritchett, Ted Ashton, Danny Bonilla, John Burdick, David Eastwood, Dean Hall, Marc Hunter, Charlie Huntley, Dave Levisohn, Lyn Noland, Rob Palmer, David Plakos, Hector Ramirez, Brian Reason, Mark Whitman, Kris Wilson, Easter Xua, Keith Dicker, Ernie Jew, Steve Martyniuk, Tore Livia, Bruce Oldham, Manny Bonilla, Mark Sanford, Keith Winikoff, Guy Jones	ABC
2009	The 51st Annual Grammy Awards	John B. Field, Eric Becker, Kenneth Shapiro, Ted Ashton, Mike Breece, Dave Eastwood, Freddy Frederick, Hank Geving, Dean Hall, Larry Heider, Dave Hilmer, Marc Hunter, Charlie Huntley, Dave Levisohn, Steve Martyniuk, Rob Palmer, Bill Philbin, Hector Ramirez, Keith Winikoff, Guy Jones	CBS
2009	Bruce Springsteen and the E Street Band Super Bowl Halftime Show	Eric Becker, David Bernstein, Rob Balton, Ray Hoover, Danny Webb, John Burdick, Jofre Rosero, Mike Colucci, Dave Driscoll, Mark Sanford, Rob Levy	NBC
2009	The 62nd Annual Tony Awards	Bruce Balton, Eric Becker, Rob Balton, Charlie Huntley, Jay Kulick, John Meiklejohn, Lyn Noland, Bob DelRusso, Jimmy Scurty, Mark Whitman, Tore Livia, Paul Ranieri	CBS

=== 2010s ===
Year	Program	Nominee(s)	Network
2010
2010	The 25th Anniversary Rock and Roll Hall of Fame Concert	Allan Wells, Mike Colucci, Dave Driscoll, Dave Eastwood, Jay Kulick, Brian Lataille, Dave Levisohn, Lyn Noland, Rob Palmer, David Plakos, George Prince, Tim Quigley, Hector Ramirez, John Repczynski, Mike Stodden, Ron Washburn, Mark Whitman, Danny Webb, Easter Xua, Jofre Rosero, Billy Steinberg	HBO
2010	The 82nd Annual Academy Awards	John B. Field, Rod Wardell, Rick Edwards, John Pritchett, Ted Ashton, Rob Balton, Danny Bonilla, Manny Bonilla, John Burdick, Dave Eastwood, Larry Heider, Marc Hunter, Jay Kulick, Dave Levisohn, Lyn Noland, Rob Palmer, David Plakos, Hector Ramirez, Brian Reason, Mark Whitman, Easter Xua, John Repczynski, Jofre Rosero, Bob DelRusso, Damien Tuffereau, Steve Martyniuk, Danny Webb, Kris Wilson, Mark Sanford, Kevin Faust, Guy Jones	ABC
2010	The 52nd Annual Grammy Awards	John B. Field, Eric Becker, Kenneth Shapiro, Ted Ashton, Danny Bonilla, Dave Eastwood, Larry Heider, Marc Hunter, Dave Levisohn, Steve Martyniuk, Rob Palmer, Bill Philbin, David Plakos, Hector Ramirez, Brian Reason, John Repczynski, Easter Xua, Randy Gomez, Kris Wilson, Keith Winikoff, Guy Jones	CBS
2010	The Kennedy Center Honors	John B. Field, John Burdick, Helene Haviland, Marc Hunter, Charlie Huntley, Jay Millard, Lyn Noland, Darryl Player, Bill Philbin, Hector Ramirez, Chris Tafuri, Mark Whitman, Paul Ranieri, Sue Noll	CBS
2010	Robin Williams: Weapons of Self Destruction	Keith Winikoff, Rob Balton, Maurice Brown, Robert Del Russo, Helene Haviland, Rolf Johansson, Lyn Noland, Ron Washburn, Carol Wetovich, Mark Whitman, Matty Randazzo	HBO
2011	Don Pasquale (Great Performances at the Met)	Emmett Loughran, Miguel Armstrong, Joe DeBonis, Manny Gutierrez, Shaun Harkins, John Kosmaczewski, Bob Long, Jay Millard, Alain Onesto, David A. Smith, Larry Solomon, Ron Washburn, Mark Whitman, Anthony DeFonzo, Matty Randazzo, Paul Ranieri	PBS
2011	The 83rd Annual Academy Awards	John B. Field, Rick Edwards, John Pritchett, David Plakos, Dave Levisohn, Lyn Noland, Charlie Huntley, Marc Hunter, Larry Heider, Hector Ramirez, Dave Eastwood, Bob DelRusso, Easter Xua, Rob Palmer, Mark Whitman, Kris Wilson, Danny Bonilla, Jofre Rosero, Danny Webb, Steve Martyniuk, John Repczynski, Ted Ashton, Rob Balton, Mark Sanford, Guy Jones, Terrance Ho	ABC
2011	The 53rd Annual Grammy Awards	John B. Field, Eric Becker, Kenneth Shapiro, Ted Ashton, Manny Bonilla, Dave Eastwood, Randy Gomez, Danny Bonilla, Dean Hall, Larry Heider, Marc Hunter, Dave Levisohn, Steve Martyniuk, Hector Ramirez, David Plakos, Brian Reason, John Repczynski, Rob Palmer, Kris Wilson, Easter Xua, Keith Winikoff, Guy Jones	CBS
2011	The Kennedy Center Honors	John B. Field, John Burdick, Helene Haviland, Charlie Huntley, Marc Hunter, Jay Millard, Lyn Noland, Bill Philbin, Hector Ramirez, Chris Tafuri, Darryl Player, Mark Whitman, Paul Ranieri, Sue Noll	CBS
2011	Lady Gaga Presents the Monster Ball Tour: At Madison Square Garden	Keith Winikoff, Robert Del Russo, Suzanne Ebner, Freddy Frederick, Pat Gleason, Helene Haviland, Garrett Hurt, Ernie Jew, Jay Kulick, Tore Livia, John Meiklejohn, Pat Minietta, Dante Pagano, Ken Patterson, Mark Renaudin, Chad Smith, Tom Ucciferri, Rich York, John Kelleran, Kevin Chung, Matty Randazzo, J.M. Hurley	HBO
2012	Memphis (Great Performances)	Steven Cimino, Barry Frischer, Paul Cangialosi, John Pinto, Chuck Goslin, Jeff Latonero, Len Wechsler, Susan Noll, J.M. Hurley	PBS
2012	The 84th Annual Academy Awards	John B. Field, John Pritchett, Rick Edwards, Dave Levisohn, Lyn Noland, John Repczynski, Marc Hunter, Larry Heider, Dave Eastwood, Hector Ramirez, Ted Ashton, Charlie Huntley, John Burdick, Easter Xua, Rob Palmer, Mark Whitman, Kris Wilson, Danny Bonilla, Jofre Rosero, Rob Balton, David Plakos, Steve Martyniuk, Shaun Harkins, Danny Webb, Mark Sanford, Terrance Ho, Guy Jones	ABC
2012	The 54th Annual Grammy Awards	John B. Field, Eric Becker, Kenneth Shapiro, Ted Ashton, Danny Bonilla, Manny Bonilla, Dave Eastwood, Randy Gomez, Dean Hall, Larry Heider, Marc Hunter, Dave Levisohn, Steve Martyniuk, Rob Palmer, David Plakos, Hector Ramirez, Brian Reason, John Repczynski, Kris Wilson, Easter Xua, Keith Winikoff, Guy Jones	CBS
2012	The Kennedy Center Honors	John B. Field, John Burdick, Helene Haviland, Marc Hunter, Charlie Huntley, Lyn Noland, Darryl Player, Danny Bonilla, Bill Philbin, Hector Ramirez, Chris Tafuri, Pat Gleason, Mark Whitman, Paul Ranieri, Susan Noll	CBS
2013	The 66th Annual Tony Awards	Eric Becker, Rob Balton, Gerard Cancel, Bob DelRusso, Charlie Huntley, Ernie Jew, Salvatore “Tore” Liva, John Meiklejohn, Lyn Noland, Mark Renaudin, Shaun Harkins, Jay Kulick, Paul Ranieri, Ka-Lai Wong	CBS
2013	The Kennedy Center Honors	John B. Field, Danny Bonilla, Michael Breece, Pat Gleason, Helene Havilland, Charlie Huntley, Lyn Noland, Darryl Player, Hector Ramirez, Chris Tafuri, Mark Whitman, Easter Xua, Susan Noll, J.M. Hurley	CBS
2013	The Oscars	John B. Field, Rick Edwards, John Pritchett, Dave Levisohn, Lyn Noland, Charlie Huntley, Marc Hunter, Larry Heider, Hector Ramirez, Dave Eastwood, Ted Ashton, Rob Balton, John Burdick, Easter Xua, Rob Palmer, Mark Whitman, Kris Wilson, Danny Bonilla, Jofre Rosero, Dean Hall, Danny Webb, John Repcynski, Steve Martyniuk, Brian Reason, Dave Plakos, Guy Jones, Terrance Ho, Keith Winikoff	ABC
2013	Super Bowl XLVII Halftime Show Starring Beyoncé	Eric Becker, Rod Wardell, Steve Orloff, John Burdick, Sol Bress, Bobby DelRusso, Jay Kulick, John Bruno, Rob Balton, Mike Miller, Kevin French, Salvatore “Tore” Liva Jr., Michael Stahl, Jeff Babush, Jofre Rosero, Luke Bowdon, Jon Mantak, Frank Lombardo, Marc Sotiropolous, Don Cornelli, Duane Rodriguez, Bob Basile, Guy Jones, Senior Rob Levy	CBS
2013	2013 Rock and Roll Hall of Fame Induction Ceremony	Allan Wells, Ted Ashton, Danny Bonilla, Dave Eastwood, Jeff Johnson, Dave Levisohn, Tore Livia, Adam Margolis, Lyn Noland, Robert Palmer, Dave Plakos, George Prince, Brian Reason, Jofre Rosero, Danny Webb, Mark Whitman, Easter Xua, Chuck Reilly	HBO
2014	The Sound of Music Live!	Emmett Loughran, Robert Muller, Rob Balton, Jerry Cancel, Leslie Hankey, Ray Hoover, Charlie Huntley, Andrew Jansen, Jay Kulick, Jeff Latonero, Pat Minietta, Brian Phraner, Claus Stuhl Weissenburg, Mark Whitman, Susan Noll, Yoneet Solange	NBC
2014	Sochi 2014 Olympic Winter Games Opening Ceremony	Mark Causey, Michael Aagaard, Cody Alexander, Michael Borowski, Sam Brattini, John Chupein, Richard B. Fox, Keith Greenwood, Michael Harvath, Kevin Kellogg, Ed Krivis, Richard Leible, Tore Livia, James Mansfield, Brian Phraner, John Pinto, Rick Rice, Thomas Stone, Nick Utley, James Wachter, Ken Woo, Harvey Szajt, Senior Video Control	NBC
2014	The Oscars	Eric Becker, Rick Edwards, John Pritchett, Rod Wardell, Rob Balton, Danny Bonilla, Robert Del Russo, David Eastwood, Suzanne Ebner, Pat Gleason, Marc Hunter, Jay Kulick, Brian Lataille, Dave Levisohn, Tore Livia, Steve Martyniuk, Lyn Noland, Rob Palmer, David Plakos, Jofre Rosero, Danny Webb, Mark Whitman, Easter Xua, Terrance Ho, Guy Jones, Keith Winikoff	ABC
2014	The 67th Annual Tony Awards	Eric Becker, Mike Anderson, Rob Balton, Robert Del Russo, Charlie Huntley, Ernie Jew, John Kosmaczewski, Jay Kulick, Tore Livia, John Meiklejohn, Lyn Noland, Jim Tufaro, Mark Whitman, Paul Ranieri, Ka-Lai Wong	CBS
2015
2015	The Oscars	Eric Becker, Rick Edwards, John Pritchett, Rod Wardell, Rob Balton, Danny Bonilla, Robert Del Russo, David Eastwood, Suzanne Ebner, Pat Gleason, Ed Horton, Marc Hunter, Jay Kulick, Brian Lataille, Tore Livia, Steve Martyniuk, Lyn Noland, Rob Palmer, David Plakos, Jofre Rosero, Danny Webb, Mark Whitman, Easter Xua, Terrance Ho, Guy Jones, Keith Winikoff	ABC
2015	The Kennedy Center Honors	John Field, JM Hurley, Senior Danny Bonilla, Michael Breece, Pat Gleason, Helene Haviland, Charlie Huntley, Mike Knarre, Lyn Noland, Jimmy O'Donnell, Hector Ramirez, Chris Tafuri, Mark Whitman, Easter Xua, Susan Noll	CBS
2015	Peter Pan Live!	Eric Becker, Bob Muller, JC Castro, Senior Paul Ranieri, Senior Rob Balton, Robert Del Russo, Fred Frederick, Shaun Harkins, Charlie Huntley, Jay Kulick, Tore Livia, John Meiklejohn, Jimmy O'Donnell, Tim Quigley, Claus Stuhlweissenburg, Mark Whitman	NBC
2015	Saturday Night Live 40th Anniversary Special	Steven Cimino, Paul Cangialosi, Carl Eckett, Eric A. Eisenstein, Rich Friedman, Chuck Goslin, John Pinto, Len Wechsler, Frank Grisanti, Susan Noll	NBC
2015	The 68th Annual Tony Awards	Mike Anderson, Eric Becker, Paul Ranieri, Senior Ka-Lai Wong, Senior Rob Balton, Robert Del Russo, Charlie Huntley, Ernie Jew, John Kosmaczwski, Jay Kulick, Tore Livia, John Meiklejohn, Lyn Noland, Mark Renaudin, Jim Tufaro, Mark Whitman	CBS
2016
2016	Grease: Live	Eric Becker, Bert Atkinson, Keith Dicker, Randy Gomez Sr., Nat Havholm, Ron Lehman, Dave Levisohn, Tore Livia, Mike Malone, Adam Margolis, Rob Palmer, Brian Reason, Damien Tuffereau, Easter Xua, Chris Hill, Matt Pascale	Fox
2016	Adele Live in New York City	Steve Cimino, Jerry Cancél, Joseph DeBonis, Eric Eisenstein, Rick Fox, Rich Freedman, Chuck Goslin, Ernie Jew, Jay Kulick, Jeff Latonero, Brian Phraner, John Pinto, Tim Quigley, Mark Renaudin, Carlos Rios, Claus Stuhlweissenburg, William Steinberg, Susan Noll, Tami Ruddy	NBC
2016	The Oscars	Kenneth Shapiro, Eric Becker, John Pritchett, Mark Whitman, Easter Xua, Rob Balton, Danny Bonilla, Robert Del Russo, David Eastwood, Jay Kulick, Brian Lataille, Tore Livia, Rob Palmer, Ralph Bolton Jr., David Carline, Dan Webb, Garrett Hurt, Helena Jackson, Greg Smith, David Plakos, Freddy Frederick, David Smith, George Prince, Keith Winikoff, Guy Jones, Terrance Ho	ABC
2016	The 69th Annual Tony Awards	Eric Becker, Mike Anderson, Ka-Lai Wong, Senior J.M. Hurley, Senior Robert DelRusso, Charlie Huntley, Ernie Jew, John Kosmaczewski, Jay Kulick, Tore Livia, John Meiklejohn, Lyn Noland, Jimmy O'Donnell, Mark Whitman, Rob Balton, David A. Smith	CBS
2016	The Wiz Live!	Bob Muller, Emmett Loughran, Miguel Armstrong, Rob Balton, Manny Gutierrez, Shaun Harkins, Jeff Latonero, Jay Millard, Jimmy O'Donnell, David A. Smith, Claus Stuhlweissenburg, Ron Washburn, Mark Whitman, William Steinberg, JC Castro	NBC
2017
2017	Hairspray Live!	Charles Ciup, Billy Steinberg, Chris Hill, Bert Atkinson, Randy Gomez, Nathanial Havholm, Ron Lehman, Bettina Levesque, Dave Levisohn, Tore Livia, Mike Malone, Adam Margolis, Rob Palmer, Brian Reason, Damien Tuffereau, Andrew Waruszewski	NBC
2017	Carpool Karaoke Primetime Special 2017	Oleg Sekulovski, Taylor Campanian, Jordan Harriman, Scott Acosta, Joel Binger, Scott Daniels, Joshua Gitersonke, Peter Hutchison, Scott Kaye, Mark McIntire, Ed Nelson, James Velarde	CBS
2017	The Oscars	Eric Becker, Kenneth Shapiro, John Pritchett, Guy Jones, Terrance Ho, Keith Winikoff, Robert Del Russo, David Eastwood, Ralph Bolton Jr., David Carline, Jay Kulick, Dan Webb, Shaun Harkins, Garrett Hurt, Toré Livia, Allen Merriweather, Lyn Noland, Fred Frederick Jr., George Prince, Mark Whitman, Rob Balton, Danny Bonilla, Rob Palmer, David Plakos, Easter Xua, Devin Atwood	ABC
2017	Super Bowl LI Halftime Show Starring Lady Gaga	Rod Wardell, Eric Becker, Guy P. Jones, Rob Levy, Stephen Dressman, Brian Neher, Steven Leotta, Jimmy Lucas, Lyn Noland, Jay Kulick, Robert Delrusso, Robert Balton, Kevin French, Jofre Rosero, Tore Livia, Mark Whitman, Vinnie Scaffidi, Ed Horton, Dave Levisohn, Phil Jaques, Buzz Schwing, Jeff Cuales, Mike Dranes, Dan Gibbons, Dave Elendt	Fox
2017	The 70th Annual Tony Awards	Eric Becker, Mike Anderson, J.M. Hurley, Ka Lai Wong, Rob Balton, Bob Del Russo, Charlie Huntley, Ernie Jew, Jay Kulick, Tore Livia, John Meiklejohn, Lyn Noland, Jimmy O'Donnell, Mark Whitman, Shaun Harkins, Jim Tufaro, Joe DeBonis	CBS
2018
2018	Jesus Christ Superstar Live in Concert	Eric Becker, Emelie Scaminaci, Ka-Lai Wong, Shaun Harkins, Raymond Hoover, Jay Kulick, Ron Lehman, Tore Livia, Adam Margolis, Lyn Noland, Jimmy O'Donnell, Mark S. Renaudin, Andrew Waruszewski	NBC
2018	Carpool Karaoke Primetime Special 2018	Shiran Stotland, Oleg Sekulovski, Taylor Campanian, Joel Binger, Peter Hutchison, Adam Margolis, Mark McIntire, James Velarde, Mike Jarocki, Josh Gitersnoke, Scott Acosta, Christian Mack, Stephen Coleman, Pete Thompson, Ian McGlockin, Doug Longwill, Ruben Avendano, Mike Hannan, Tony Jackson, Brian Andrews, Dominic Bendijo, Ruben Avendano, Mike Taylor, David Shawl	CBS
2018	The Oscars	Kenneth Shapiro, Eric Becker, John Pritchett, Terrence Ho, Keith Winikoff, Guy Jones, Robert Del Russo, David Eastwood, Ralph Bolton, David Carline, Jay Kulick, Dan Webb, Shaun Harkins, Garrett Hurt, Tore Livia, Allen Merriweather, Lyn Noland, Mark Whitman, Freddy Fredericks, George Prince, Rob Balton, Danny Bonilla, Rob Palmer, David Plakos, Easter Xua	ABC
2018	2018 Rock and Roll Hall of Fame Induction Ceremony	Lori Gallati, Jon Pretnar, Billy Steinberg, JC Castro, Marc Bloomgarden, Dave Driscoll, Vincent Foeillet, Shaun Harkins, Jay Kulick, Jeff Latonero, Lyn Noland, Rob Palmer, Tim Quigley, Mark Renaudin, Dave Rudd, Jim Scurti, Adam Vollick, Rich York	HBO
2018	Super Bowl LII Halftime Show Starring Justin Timberlake	Rod Wardell, Eric Becker, Guy Jones, Robert Levy, Harvey Szajt, Oliver Bosill, Dave Zulauf, Stephen Leotta, David Birdy, Lyn Noland, Tore Livia, Robert Balton, Kevin French, Jofre Rosero, Steven Heinz, Mark Lynch, Jeff Latonero, Allen Powers, Jay Kulick, Deena Sheldon, Robert Del Russo, Ed Martino, Michael Croke, Buzz Schwing, Larry Faircloth, David Fraser, Michael Snyder, Mike Brady, Michael Miller, Dean Kamienski	NBC
2019
2019	Carpool Karaoke Primetime Special 2019	Shiran Stotland, Oleg Sekulovski, Taylor Campanian, Joel Binger, Peter Hutchison, Adam Margolis, Mark McIntire, James Velarde, Mike Jarocki, Josh Gitersnoke, Scott Acosta, Christian Mack, Stephen Coleman, Pete Thompson, Ian McGlockin, Doug Longwill, Ruben Avendano, Mike Hannan, Tony Jackson, Brian Andrews, Dominic Bendijo, Ruben Avendano, Mike Taylor, David Shawl, William O'Donnell, Trace Dantzig, Joshua Greenrock	CBS
2019	The Kennedy Center Honors	Eric Becker, John Michael Hurley, Susan Noll, Rob Balton, David Eastwood, Patrick Gleason, Danny Bonilla, Charlie Huntley, Helene Haviland, Steven R. Martyniuk, Jay Kulick, Fred Frederick, Jimmy O'Donnell, Lyn Noland, Mark Whitman, Easter Xua	CBS
2019	The Oscars	Kenneth Shapiro, Eric Becker, John Pritchett, Terrence Ho, Guy Jones, Keith Winikoff, Ralph Bolton, David Carline, Robert Del Russo, David Eastwood, Suzanne Ebner, Freddy Fredericks, Shaun Harkins, Garrett Hurt, Jay Kulick, Tore Livia, Allen Merriweather, Lyn Noland, George Prince, Dan Webb, Rob Palmer, David Plakos, Easter Xua, Rob Balton, Danny Bonilla	ABC
2019	RENT	Eric Becker, Charles Ciup, Emilie Scaminaci, Chris Hill, Bert Atkinson, Nat Havholm, Ron Lehman, David Levisohn, Tore Livia, Adam Morgolis, Rob Palmer, Brian Reason, Dylan Sanford, Damien Turrerau, Andrew Waruszewski	Fox
2019	The 72nd Annual Tony Awards	Eric Becker, Mike Anderson, J.M. Hurley, Ka Lai Wong, Rob Balton, Bob Del Russo, Charlie Huntley, Jay Kulick, John Kosmaczewski, Tore Livia, James Scurti, Lyn Noland, Jimmy O'Donnell, Jim Tufaro, Mark Whitman, David Smith	CBS

=== 2020s ===
Year	Program	Nominee(s)	Network
2020
2020	Live in Front of a Studio Audience: "All in the Family" and "Good Times"	Eric Becker, Kevin Faust, Ron Hirshman, Ed Horton, Helena Jackson, Jon Purdy, Jimmy Velarde, Allen Merriweather, Greg Grouwinkel, Randy Gomez Sr., Andrew Ansnick	ABC
2020	2019 American Music Awards	Eric Becker, John Pritchett, Guy Jones, Wes Steinberg, Joe Bohman, Ralph Bolton, Danny Bonilla, Suzanne Ebner, Garrett Hurt, Brian Lataille, David Levisohn, Steve Martyniuk, Allen Merriweather, Rob Pittman, Dave Plakos, Rob Vuona, John Pry, Dan Webb, Steve Thiel, Easter Xua	ABC
2020	Dave Chappelle: Sticks & Stones	Jon Pretnar, Ruben Avendano, Daniel Balton, Mano Bonilla, Eli Clarke, Helene Haviland, Ed Horton, Lyn Noland, JR Reid, Ronald N. Travisano	Netflix
2020	The Little Mermaid Live!	Iqbal Hans, Rod Wardell, Emelie Scaminaci, Michael Maiatico, Damien Tuffereau, Nathanial Havholm, Freddy Frederick, Salvatore Livia, Jofre Rosero, Easter Xua, David Plakos, Patrick Gleason, Keyan Safyari, David Eastwood	ABC
2020	The Oscars	Eric Becker, John Pritchett, Kenneth Shapiro, Terrence Ho, Mark Sanford, Guy Jones, Robert Del Russo, David Eastwood, David Carline, Suzanne Ebner, Jay Kulick, Dan Webb, Shaun Harkins, Garrett Hurt, Tore Livia, Allen Merriweather, Lyn Noland, Freddy Fredericks, George Prince, Ralph Bolton, Rob Palmer, David Plakos, Easter Xua, Rob Balton, Danny Bonilla	ABC
2021
2021	Hamilton	Pat Capone, Jack Donnelly, Dave Knox, Bruce MacCallum, Bill Winters, Maceo Bishop, Abby Levine, Joe Belack	Disney+
2021	David Byrne's American Utopia	Ellen Kuras, Gregor Tavenner, Peter Agliata, Charles Libin, Declan Quinn, Sam Levy, David Waterston, Tim Ives, Kerwin DeVonish, Yousheng Tang	HBO
2021	The 63rd Annual Grammy Awards	Rod Wardell, Eric Becker, Iqbal Hans, David Eastwood, Sean Flannery, Marc Hunter, Tore Livia, Allen Merriweather, David Plakos, Jofre Rosero, Keyan Safyari, Dylan Sanford, Guy Jones, Terrance Ho	CBS
2021	The Oscars	Eric Becker, Iqbal Hans, John Pritchett, Kenneth Shapiro, Devin Atwood, Danny Bonilla, Mano Bonilla, David Carline, Keith Dicker, David Eastwood, Suzanne Ebner, Freddy Fredericks, Garrett Hurt, Tore Livia, Steve Martyniuk, Allen Merriweather, Rob Palmer, David Plakos, George Prince, Dan Webb, Easter Xua, Brad Zerbst, Guy Jones, Kevin Faust, Terrence Ho, John Palacio Jr.	ABC
2021	The Pepsi Super Bowl LV Halftime Show Starring The Weeknd	Rod Wardell, Eric Becker, Robert Del Russo, Kevin French, Shaun Harkins, Jay Kulick, Jeff Latonero, Tore Livia, Allen Merriweather, Jofre Rosero, Mike Harvath, David Geller, Don Miller, Keith Rees, Timmy Mueller, Jeff Gentile, Jon Mantak, Carmen Long, Frank Lombardo, Steve Webster, Stephen Wharton, Ed Martino, Rian Weigart, JD Curl, Christian Pantuosco, Andrew Lawing, Joe Ward, John "JM" Hurley, Ian Fleisher, Emelie Scaminaci	CBS
2022
2022	Adele: One Night Only	Michael Anderson, Dan Winterburn, Danny Webb, Rob Palmer, David Eastwood, Vincent Foilett, Allen Merriweather, Bruce Green, Robert Del Russo, Brian Lataille, Keith Dicker, Patrick Gleason, Danny Bonilla, Rob Vuona, Dave Rudd, Keyan Safyari, Freddy Frederick, Gabriel De La Perna, Jofre Rosero, David Carline, Kosta Krstic, Terrance Ho, Joey Lopez	CBS
2022	The 57th Academy of Country Music Awards	Eric Becker, Iqbal Hans, Danny Bonilla, Mano Bonilla, Davide Carline, Robert Del Russo, Suzanne Ebner, Darla Elledge, Freddy Frederick Jr., Pat Gleason, Ed Horton, Garrett Hurt, Kat Kallergis, Jay Kulick, Steve Martyniuk, Allen Merriweather, Lyn Nolad, Rob Palmer, John Perry, David Plakos, Easter Xua, Danny Webb, Matt Greene, Cody Alderman, Daniel Schade, Jeff Lee, Terrance Ho, Guy Jones, Kevin Faust	Prime Video
2022	The 64th Annual Grammy Awards	Eric Becker, Ken Shapiro, Danny Bonilla, Michael Carr, Suzanne Ebner, Sean Flannery, Jeremy Freeman, Helena Jackson, Tore Livia, Steve Martyniuk, Allen Merriweather, Rob Palmer, John Perry, David Plakos, Jofre Rosero, Keyan Safyari, Chad Smith, Easter Xua, Guy Jones, Kevin Faust	CBS
2022	2021 MTV Video Music Awards	Eric Becker, Mike Williams, Shaun Harkins, John Lee, Rich York, David Trenkle, Nat Havholm, Robert Del Russo, Mark Renaudin, Tore Livia, Rob Balton, Jimmy O'Donnell, Marc Bloomgarden, Ray Hoover, Daniel Paulet, Kurt Decker, Jay Kulick, Jeff Latonero, Jofre Rosaro, J.M. Hurley, Bob Benedetti	MTV
2022	One Last Time: An Evening with Tony Bennett and Lady Gaga	Lori Gallati, Rob Balton, Jerry Cancel, Eli Clarke, Robert Del Russo, Dave Driscoll, Jay Kulick, Jeff Latonero, Lyn Noland, Mark Renaudin, Carlos Rios, Jim Scurti, Tim Quigley, Dan Zadwarny, J.M. Hurley	CBS
2023
2023	Elton John Live: Farewell from Dodger Stadium	Emmett Loughran, Robert Del Russo, Mark Britt, David Driscoll, Tim Farmer, Peter Forrest, Andrew Georgopoulos, Pat Gleason, Bruce Green, Shaun Harkins, Jay Kulick, Kevin Murphy, Lyn Noland, Jimmy O'Donnell, Rob Palmer, Jesse Placky, David Plakos, George Prince, Mark Renaudin, David Rudd, Austin Rock, Keyan Safyari, Ed Staebler, Rob Vuona, Mark Whitman, Rich York, Jeff Lee, Michael Taylor, Brian Lataille, Loic Maheas, Chris Schuster	Disney+
2023	The Apple Music Super Bowl LVII Halftime Show Starring Rihanna	Eric Becker, David Alfano, Rob Balton, Danny Bonilla, Kary D'Alessandro, Keith Dicker, Sean Flannery, Kevin French, Darin Haggard, Shaun Harkins, Helena Jackson, Tayler Knight, Toré Livia, Allen Merriweather, Eann Potter, Jofre Rosero, Keyan Safyari, Casey Roche, Christopher Rybitski	Fox
2023	Encanto at the Hollywood Bowl	Christine Salomon, Shanele Alvarez, Dominic Bendijo, Bonnie Blake, Danny Bonilla, Kary D'Alessandro, Sean Flannery, Shaun Harkins, Charlie Henry, Cory Hunter, George Reasner, Jofre Rosero, David Rudd, Ryan Schultz, Aymae Sulick	Disney+
2023	2022 Rock and Roll Hall of Fame Induction Ceremony	Toby Santos, Danny Bonilla, Kary D'Alessandro, Keith Dicker, Dave Eastwood, Guido Frenzel, Andrew Georgopoulos, Jeff Johnson, Zac Jones, Brian Lataille, Dave Levisohn, Sean Mark Mckelvey, Steve Martyniuk, Rob Palmer, Dave Plakos, Dave Rudd, Dylan Sanford, Matt Trujillo, Roy Walker, Andrew Waruszewski, Easter Xua	HBO
2023	The Weeknd: Live at SoFi Stadium	Toby Santos, Brandon Smith, Scott Acosta, Dominic Bendijo, Manny Bonilla, Mano Bonilla, Justin Danzansky, Austin Ellsworth, Chris Ferguson, Jeremy Freeman, Andrew Georgopoulos, Randy Gomez, Jonny Harkins, Shaun Harkins, Travis Hays, Cory Hunter, Oliver Lanzenberg, Ron Lehman, Andrew McMillan, Dee Nichols, Connor O'Brien, Josh Perry, Rob Pittman, Keyan Safyari, Daniel Schade, Austin Straub, Josh Turner, Justin Umphenour, Joe Victoria, Vince Warburton, Drew Welker	HBO
2024
2024	Billy Joel: The 100th — Live at Madison Square Garden	Jon Pretnar, Rob Balton, Mark Britt, Bobby Del Russo, Daniel Erbeck, Nick Fayo, Pete Forrest, Jonny Harkins, Shaun Harkins, Ray Hoover, John Kosmaczewski, Jay Kulick, Kevin Murphy, Lyn Noland, Jimmy O'Donnell, Chris Piazza, Mark Renaudin, Ed Staebler, Mark Whitman, Rich York, Jeff Siegel, Brett Turnbull, J.M. Hurley, Michael Maiatico	CBS
2024	The Apple Music Super Bowl LVIII Halftime Show Starring Usher	Eric Becker, Rod Wardell, Rob Balton, Danny Bonilla, Kary D'Alessandro, Suzanne Ebner, Sean Flannery, Kevin French, Helena Jackson, Tore Livia, Adam Margolis, Allen Merriweather, Jofre Rosero, Keyan Safyari, J.M. Hurley, Matt Conrad, Terrance Ho	CBS
2024	The Daily Show Presents: Jordan Klepper Fingers the Pulse — Moscow Tools	Bernardo Garcia, Al Johnson, Andrew Maso, Patrick O'Donnel, Joel Sadler, Bart Sienkiewicz, Jim Wells	Comedy Central
2024	The 66th Grammy Awards	Eric Becker, Rod Wardell, Danny Bonilla, Mike Carr, Suzanne Ebner, Sean Flannery, Helena Jackson, Ron Lehman, Tore Livia, Adam Margolis, Allen Merriweather, Rob Palmer, David Plakos, Brian Reason, Jofre Rosero, Keyan Safyari, Easter Xua, Daniel Schade, Ryan Campbell, Scott Hazel, Peter Drinco, Greg Hoffman	CBS
2024	Hannah Waddingham: Home for Christmas	Chuck Crampton, Lincoln Abraham, Charlie Bryan, Mark Cruickshank, Paul Davis, Alex Dodd, Curtis Dunne, Guiseppe Ingrao, Lewis Mutongwizo, Andre Seraille, Jeremy Mackie, Joseph Hallgate, Jon Kassell, Simon Wood	Apple TV+
2025
2025	SNL50: The Anniversary Special	Bill DiGiovanni, John Pinto, Paul Cangialosi, Anthony Tarantino, Dave Driscoll, Brian Phraner, Daniel Erbeck, Michael Knarre, Anthony Lenzo, Ansel Nunez, Rick Fox	NBC
2025	Bono: Stories of Surrender	Erik Messerschmidt, Mark Goellnicht, Brian S. Osmond, Vince Vennitti, Charles Libin, Christine Kapo Ng, Richard Rutkowski, Luke McCoubrey	Apple TV+
2025	An Evening with Dua Lipa	Nick Kauffman, Lincoln Abraham, Gareth Beeson, John Clarke, Alex Dodd, Curtis Dunne, Dave Emery, Dave Evans, Ben Frewin, Lisha Gilbert, Matt Gladstone, Dom Jackson, Rob Mansfield, Ali Miller, James Neal, Sophie Penwill, Mark Sayers, Alan Wells, Shaun Willis	CBS
2025	An Evening with Elton John & Brandi Carlile	Dan Winterburn, Bill Ashworth, Curtis Dunne, Alex Dodd, Ben Frewin, Sam Keogh, Marcus Leon Soon, Lewis Mutongwizo, Mark Sayers, Andre Seraille, Carl Veckranges, Shaun Willis, Alan Wells	CBS
2025	The Lion King at the Hollywood Bowl	Brandon Smith, Tim Farmer, Jofre Rosero, David Rudd, George Prince, Karin Pelloni, Rob Palmer, Bobby Delrusso, Rob Vuona, Austin Rock, John Perry, Adam Margolis, Danny Bonilla, Danny Webb	Disney+
2025	2024 Rock & Roll Hall of Fame Induction Ceremony	Eric Becker, Danny Bonilla, Kary D'Alessandro, Dave Driscoll, Curtis Eastwood, David Eastwood, Nathanial Havholm, Jeff Johnson, Zachariah Jones, Jay Kulick, Dave Levisohn, Adam Margolis, Rob Palmer, Tim Quigley, Jofre Rosero, David Rudd, Chad Smith, Matt Trujillo, Easter Xua, Tom Zaleski, Jeremy Freeman	ABC
2026
2026	The Apple Music Super Bowl LX Halftime Show Starring Bad Bunny	Rod Wardell, Eric Becker, Dylan Sanford, Rob Balton, Danny Bonilla, Keith Dicker, Sean Flannery, Jeremy Freeman, Kevin French, Helena Jackson, Martin Kitchen, Bettina Levesque, David Plakos, Matt Roe, Jofre Rosero, Keyan Safyari, Monte Seaborn, Matt Trujillo, Brad Zerbst, Scott I. Acosta, Santiago Benet, Gilberto Cruz, Robert Smith, Cody Taylor, Kevin Denning, Andrew Moore, Rick Compeau, Su-Jeng Sang, Chris Hill, Matt Conrad, Adam Lighterman	NBC
2026	The Oscars	Danny Bonilla, Bob Del Russo, Sean Flannery, Shaun Harkins, Nathanial Havholm, Helena Jackson, Dave Kanehann, Jay Kulick, Adam Margolis, David Plakos, Jofre Rosero, Keyan Safyari, Dylan Sanford, Matthew Trujillo, Suzie Weis, Mark Whitman, Easter Xua, Scott Marshall, Eric Becker, John Pritchett, Tore Livia, Kenneth Shapiro, Rod Wardell	ABC
2026	Rock & Roll Hall of Fame Induction 2025	Eric Becker, Dylan Sanford, David Rudd, Jofre Rosero, Easter Xua, Nathanial Havholm, John Porter, Sean Flannery, Zachariah Jones, Dave Levisohn, Kary D'Alessandro, Jeff Johnson, Rob Palmer, David Eastwood, Danny Bonilla, Danny Webb, Keith Dicker, Chad Smith, David Plakos, Jeremy Freeman	ABC
2026	Taylor Swift | The Eras Tour | The Final Show	Eric Becker, Brett Turnbull, Danny Bonilla, Mike Dinsmore, Chris Ferguson, Josh Fisch, Sean Flannery, Freddie Frederick, Shane Geddes, Manny Gutierrez, Jonny Harkins, Shaun Harkins, Christopher Johnson, Jeff Johnson, Ian Kerr, Jay Kulick, Tore Livia, Gallant Ly, Adam Margolis, Steve Martyniuk, Rob Palmer, Karin Pelloni, David Plakos, Carly Plett, Tim Quigley, Brian Reason, Paul Sapsis, Kate Smith, Jim van Dijk, Victor Wong, Richard York	Disney+
2026	Wicked: One Wonderful Night	Brandon Smith, Brett Turnbull, Rob Palmer, Karin Pelloni, Bobby Del Russo, Cary Symmons, Dean Clish, Jorge Ferris, Suzanne Ebner, Andrew Georgopoulos, Danny Bonilla, Chad Smith, Jonny Harkins, Alex Hernandez, Rob Vuona, Scott Acosta, Randy Gomez Jr., Jeremy Freeman, Tim Farmer	NBC
