= Material flow management =

Material flow management (MFM) is an economic focused method of analysis and reformation of goods production and subsequent waste through the lens of material flows, incorporating themes of sustainability and the theory of a circular economy. It is used in social, medical, and urban contexts. However, MFM has grown in the field of industrial ecology, combining both technical and economic approaches to minimize waste that impacts economic prosperity and the environment. It has been heavily utilized by the country of Germany, but it has been applied to the industries of various other countries. The material flow management process utilizes the Sankey diagram, and echoes the circular economy model, while being represented in media environments as a business model which may help lower the costs of production and waste.

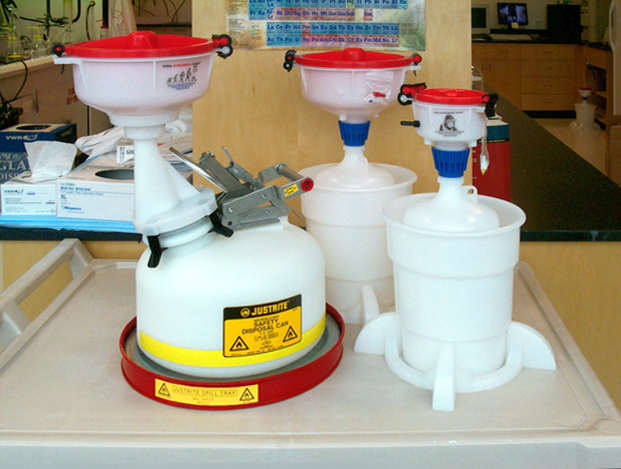
An OSHA and EPA-compliant system of waste management that utilizes the principles of material flow management to conserve and limit dangerous waste

== Context ==
Material flow management began as a largely academic discourse, eventually becoming an actual tool implemented by both countries and industries.

The first clear suggestion of material flow management was that of Robert A. Frosch and Nicholas E. Gallopoulos. Published in the Scientific American Journal in 1989, Frosch and Gallopoulos introduced and recommended the optimization of waste from industrial processes to then be reused for another. While lacking in detail, the analysis of material flow management continued to develop years later, with Robert Socolow and Valerie Thomas beginning to support findings with data, publishing their work in the Journal of Industrial Ecology in 1997.

Material flow management was established as a policy at the 1992 Rio De Janeiro United Nations Conference on Environment and Development (UNCED), or UN "Earth Summit" Conference. The event was later credited as an advancement towards three UN treaties: Framework Convention on Climate Change, the Convention on Biological Diversity, and the Convention to Combat Desertification.

Material flow management has been credited as a factor in environmental sustainability and environmental management, given its focus on responsible management of ecosystems and ecosystem services for current use, and that of future generations.

== Uses and applications ==
One of the terms used in academic and practical discussions of material flow management is "material flow analysis" (MFA), which is identified as part of the MFM process. MFA is the more target-oriented analysis of substance flow within a system of production, especially within a company.

Material flow analysis is the responsibility of both organized governments and industries. While policies produced by governmental bodies create a framework, the actual design and implementation are done by industries. There are several stakeholders involved in these processes.

Material flow management assessment began to take country- and government-focused approaches following a 1997 publication by the World Resources Institute for the Netherlands and Germany. It displayed the total flow, soon adjusted to divide overall flows into its major constituents. In 2002, the United States Environmental Protection Agency released the report, Beyond RCRA: Waste and Materials Management in the Year 2020, finding that it is time for society to shift from a waste management-focused environmental plan to a material management-focused plan.

Another assessment was conducted by Taylor Searcy in 2017, revitalizing Fiji’s sustainable sea transportation industry to improve socio-economic and environmental impacts.

A 2019 study of the material flow in Brazil's mortar and concrete supply chain concluded that in terms of material use efficiency, the ratio of product to material consumption results in a low score, with the most outstanding inefficient processes being quarry waste and building waste at extraction and construction sites.

== Government policies ==
The United States began seriously incorporating material flow management in its environmental policies with the Resource Conservation and Recovery Act of 1976. This gave the government the ability the control hazardous waste produced by all steps of production. Eventually, Congress helped strengthen the RCRA with the Hazardous and Solid Waste Amendments of 1984, incorporating more preventative policies.

In 2006, Israel released a Sustainable Solid Waste Management Plan, outlining green goals and priorities for the country's waste system, including economic tools of execution. Policies for household recycling and waste collection separation were then solidified with the 2010 Recycling Action Plan.

Korea has also introduced various policies that have executed MFM, specifically in regard to food waste. A 2005 ban on putting untreated food in landfills was followed by a 2012 ban on ocean dumping. In addition to these environmental initiatives, the country combined the economic and social aspects of MFM using food waste agreements with vital economic sectors, as well as public awareness campaigns.

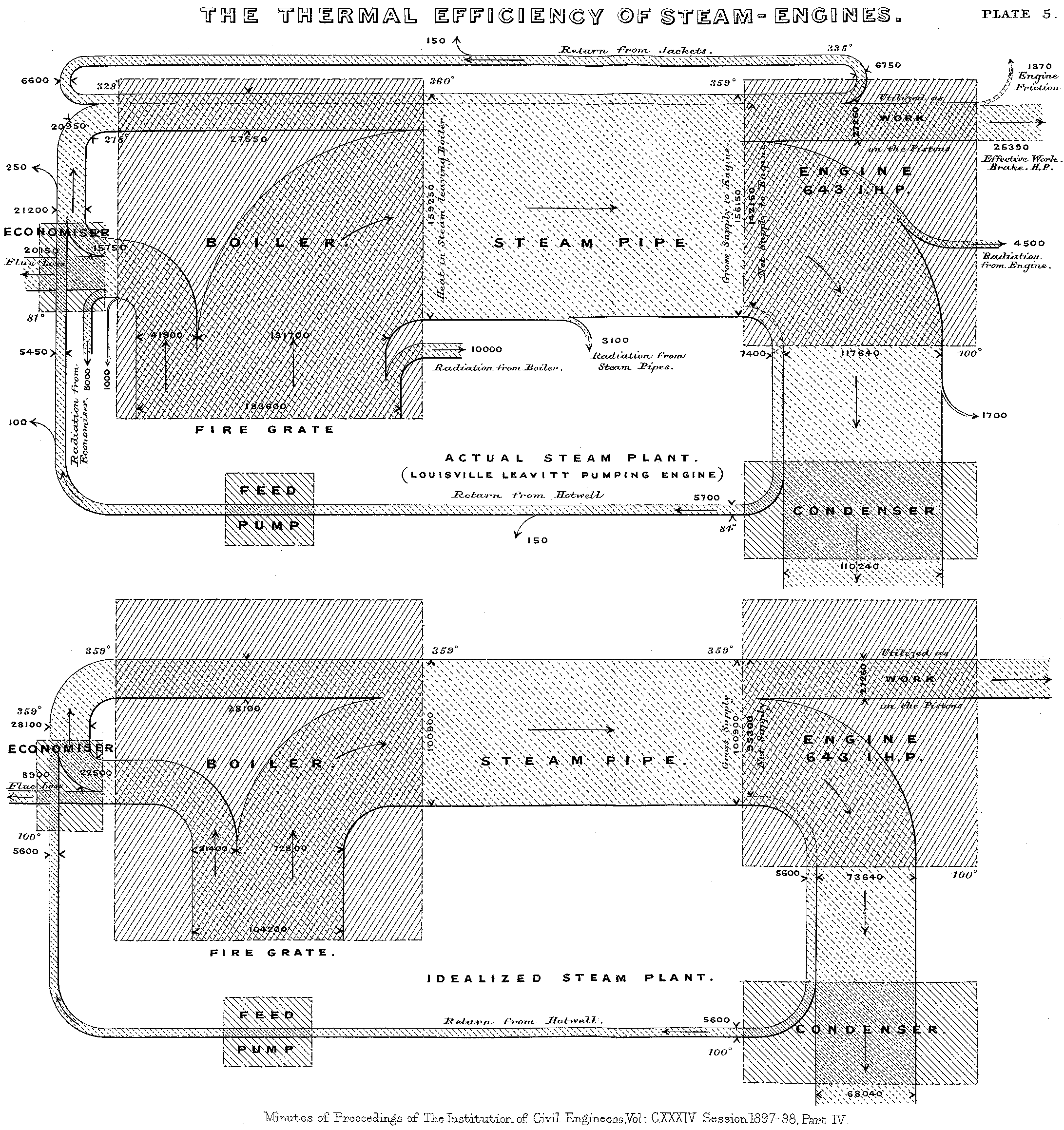
The Sankey Diagram created to display the thermal efficiency of Steam Engines in 1898.

== Sankey diagram ==
The material flow management process utilizes the Sankey diagram, and echoes the circular economy model, while being represented in media environments as a business model which may help lower the costs of production and waste. An important tool for MFM is the Sankey diagram. It was developed by Irish engineer Riall Sankey to analyze the efficiency of steam engines and has since become a tool in industrial engineering and science. Sankey diagrams are a visual representation of industrial ecology. While they were mostly used in historical contexts, they are useful for assessing ecological impacts.

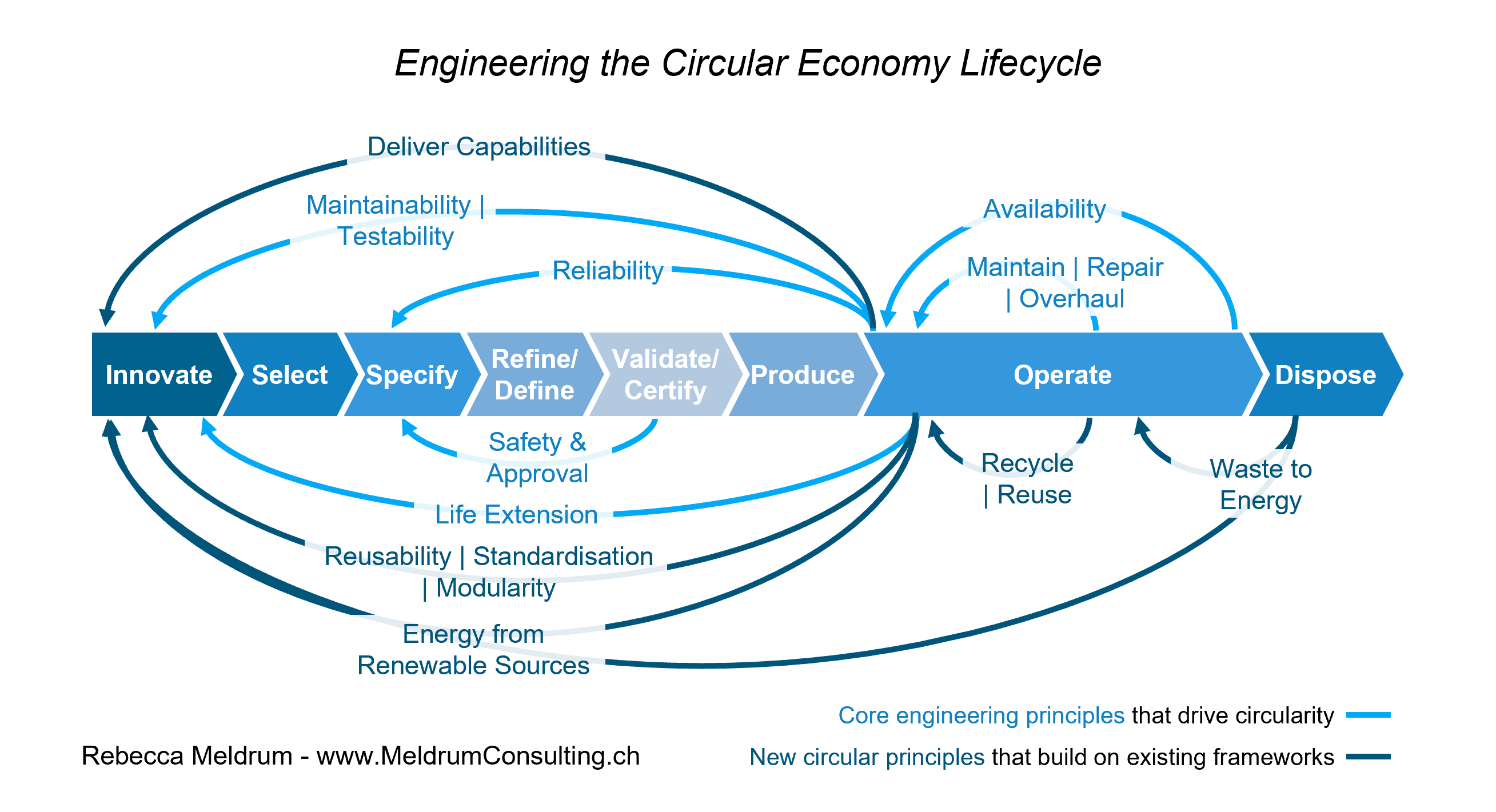
A diagram displaying the circular economy, where the second half has a focus on utilizing and limiting the amount of waste produced.

== Circular economy ==
A circular economy is a model of resource production and consumption in any economy that involves sharing, leasing, reusing, repairing, refurbishing, and recycling existing materials and products. The circular economy, an economic system still in the development process (not yet widely adopted), intends to model itself after the material flow management and energy models in biological systems. Focusing on society-wide benefits, it designs a system without waste or pollution and intends to keep products and materials in the system for as long as possible. Applications of the circular economy in the European Union have produced evidence of practicality, estimating that implementation in agricultural, chemical, and construction sectors could reduce up to 7.5 billion tonnes of CO_{2}e globally.

== Media representation ==
In today's studies on the effectiveness of MFM for improving productivity, an analysis of its implementation has been debated with its correlation to government roles in environmental management. With the large spike in environmental disaster concepts regarding the depletion of resources by human activity, MFM could be interpreted as a promoter of the circular economy and an analysis of the necessity of such.

In this light, MFM is being utilized as a business strategy that would be meant to optimize vertical integration of manufacturing. Companies focusing on the economics behind MFM, rather than the subject of the environmental crisis, may take note of how MFM lowers the cost of materials by creating an efficient approach to sustainability.

Material flow management as a business model may appear to some to promote sustainability in the long run. However, its critics still find these two terms – MFM and sustainability – to be at a crossroads despite the vertical integration model of manufacturing showing agreement in their processes.

== See also ==
- Environmental ethics, a part of environmental philosophy which argues for the protection of natural entities, informing waste management practices
- Environmentalism, a philosophy which centers on the protection of the Earth and can be achieved through material flow management
- Environmental protection, a practice involving the protection of natural environments and taking preventative measures that may include material flow management
- Material flow accounting, a method of studying the flow of materials and wastes on national or regional scales, with economic factors which lend themselves to material flow management

vte Industrial ecology
Tools	Agent-based model; Cost–benefit analysis; DPSIR; Ecolabel; Ecological footprint; Environmental full-cost accounting; Environmental impact assessment; Environmental management system; EIO-LCA; Input–output model; Integrated chain management; ISO 14000; Life-cycle assessment; Life-cycle cost analysis; Material flow analysis; MET Matrix; Stakeholder analysis
Concepts	Circular economy; Cradle-to-cradle design; Dematerialization; Eco-efficiency; Eco-industrial development; Eco-industrial park; Ecological modernization; Efficient energy use; Exergy; Extended producer responsibility; Industrial metabolism; Industrial symbiosis; Polluter pays principle; Precautionary principle; Rebound effect; Waste hierarchy; Waste minimisation; Waste valorization
Related fields	Cleaner production; Design for environment; Earth systems engineering and management; Ecological economics; Ecological modernization; Environmental economics; Green chemistry; Sustainable development; Urban ecology; Urban metabolism
