= Mátrai =

Mátrai is a surname. Notable people with the surname include:

- István Mátrai (born 1949), Hungarian sports shooter
- Károly Mátrai, Hungarian economist
- Márta Mátrai, Hungarian politician
- Sándor Mátrai (1932–2002), Hungarian football defender
