= Jean Dewasne =

French painter and sculptor (1921–1999)

- Born: 1921
- Died: 1999 (aged 77–78)
- Occupations: Painter, sculptor

Jean Dewasne (1921–1999) was a French abstract painter and sculptor. His artwork is in the collections of the Centre Pompidou, The Met, and the Museum of Modern Art.
