= Mets (disambiguation) =

The New York Mets are a major league baseball team in New York City.

METS is the Metadata Encoding and Transmission Standard.

Mets, METS or The Mets may also refer to:

== In sports ==
=== Baseball teams ===
==== Active teams ====
- Binghamton Mets, Binghamton, New York
- DSL Mets, which plays in the Dominican Summer League
- Florida Complex League Mets, Port St. Lucie, Florida
- London Mets, London, United Kingdom
- Moncton Mets, Moncton, New Brunswick, Canada
- St. Lucie Mets, Port St. Lucie, Florida
- Syracuse Mets, Syracuse, New York

==== Former teams ====
- New York Metropolitans, New York City
- Auburn Mets, Auburn, New York
- Columbia Mets, Columbia, South Carolina
- Greenville Mets, Greenville, South Carolina
- Jackson Mets, Jackson, Mississippi
- Kingsport Mets, Kingsport, Tennessee
- Little Falls Mets, Little Falls, New York
- Marion Mets, Marion, Virginia
- Meridian Mets, Meridian, Mississippi
- Pittsfield Mets, Little Falls, New York
- Wausau Mets, Wausau, Wisconsin
- Williamsport Mets, Williamsport, Pennsylvania
- Winter Haven Mets, Winter Haven, Florida

=== Other sports ===
- Mets de Guaynabo (basketball), a basketball team in Guaynabo, Puerto Rico
- Mets de Guaynabo (volleyball), a volleyball team in Guaynabo, Puerto Rico

== Acronym or abbreviation ==
- Math, engineering, technology, and science, an acronym replaced by science, technology, engineering, and mathematics (STEM)
- Metabolic equivalent (MET, often in plural as METS), a measure of exercise intensity
- Metabolic syndrome
- Metastasis, the spread of a disease from one organ or part to another non-adjacent organ or part
- Metropolitan Evansville Transit System

== Other uses ==
- Mets (surname), a surname of Estonian origin
- Mets, Greece, a neighbourhood of Athens

== See also ==
- Metz (disambiguation)
- Met (disambiguation)
