= Hillar =

Estonian male given name

- Gender: Male

Origin
- Region of origin: Estonia

Hillar is an Estonian masculine given name and may refer to:

- Hillar Aarelaid (born 1967), Estonian security officer
- Hillar Eller (1939–2010), Estonian politician
- Hillar Hein (born 1954), Estonian ski jumper, Nordic combined skier and coach
- Hillar Kalda (born 1932), Estonian physician and politician
- Hillar Kareva (1931–1992), Estonian composer
- Hillar Kärner (1935–2017), Estonian chess player
- Hillar Mets (born 1954), Estonian cartoonist, illustrator and animator
- Hillar Palamets (1927–2022), Estonian historian and radio presenter
- Hillar Rootare (1928–2008), Estonian-American physical chemist and materials scientist
- Hillar Teder (born 1962), Estonian businessman

== As a surname ==
- Helena Hillar Rosenqvist (born 1946), a Swedish politician.
- Marian Hillar (born 1938), an American philosopher, theologian, linguist, and scientist.
