= Live from the Metropolitan Opera =

American television series (1977–2003)

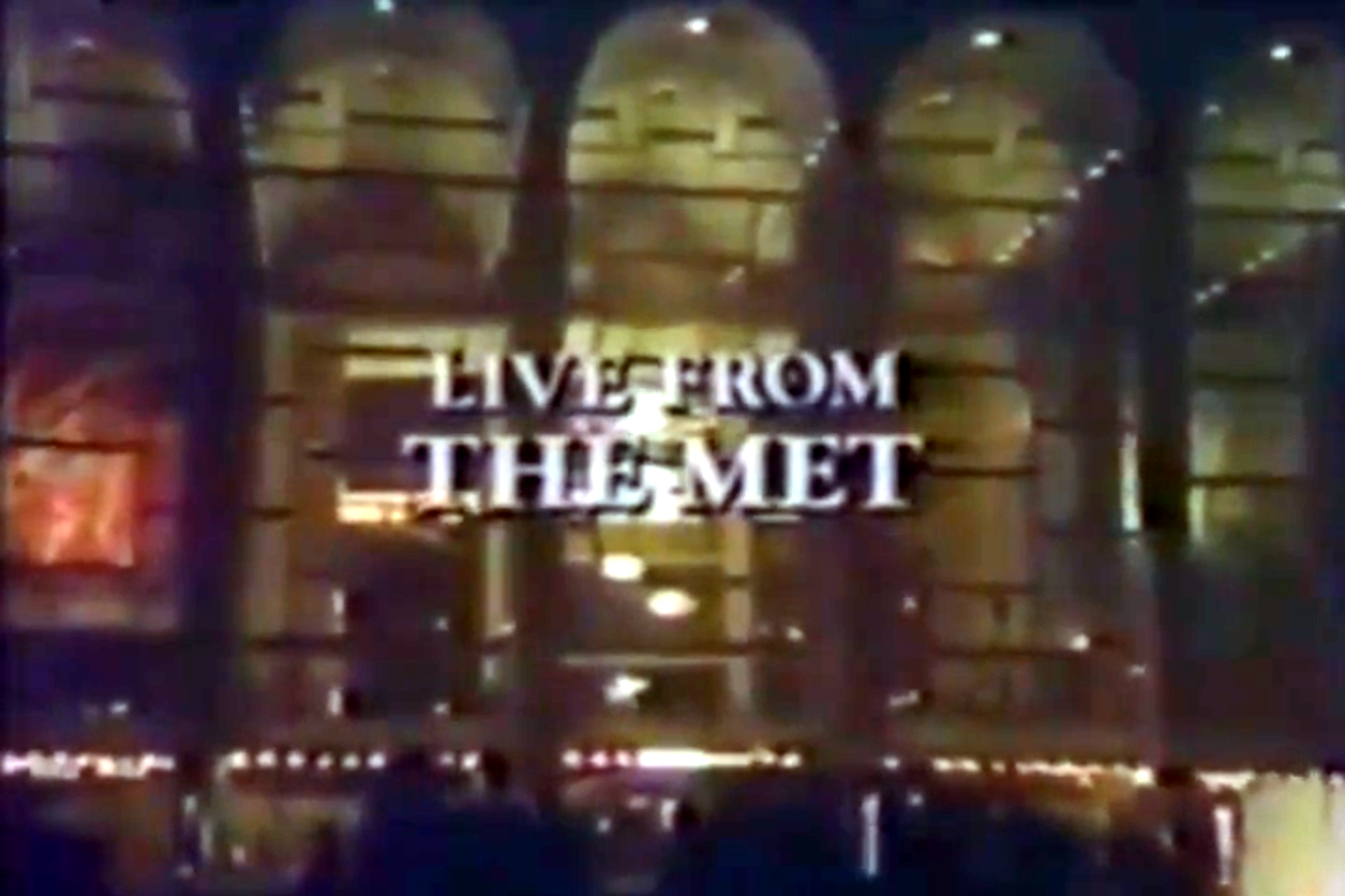
- Title screen of Live from the Met (January 5, 1985)
- Also known as: Live from the Met (1977–1987); The Metropolitan Opera Presents (1988–2003); Great Performances at the Met (2007–present)
- Presented by: Peter Allen (narrator); Tony Randall, Francis Robinson, Speight Jenkins, Alexander Scourby, Joanne Woodward, F. Murray Abraham, or Garrick Utley (various hosts)
- Country of origin: United States
- Original language: English
- No. of seasons: 27
- No. of episodes: 95

Production
- Production companies: Metropolitan Opera; WNET

Original release
- Network: PBS
- Release: March 15, 1977 – May 18, 2003

Related
- Great Performances

Live from the Metropolitan Opera (also known as Live from the Met and The Metropolitan Opera Presents) is an American television program that presents performances of complete operas from the Metropolitan Opera in New York City on the Public Broadcasting Service (PBS) network.

The twenty-seven-season program began on March 15, 1977, and was telecast live for its first few seasons. The first telecast, Giacomo Puccini's La Bohème, features Luciano Pavarotti as Rodolfo and Renata Scotto as Mimì, with James Levine conducting (all three were interviewed during intermission), and Tony Randall as the host.

Live from the Met functioned as a supplement to the company's regular Saturday Metropolitan Opera radio broadcasts. During its first fifteen years the program was frequently simulcast, enabling some audiences to hear the opera in stereo via radio as well. Hosts included noted comedian and actor Tony Randall, Francis Robinson (the long-time assistant manager and press director of the Metropolitan Opera widely known as "Mr. Metropolitan Opera,"), noted lecturer and Seattle Opera dignitary Speight Jenkins, Alexander Scourby, Academy Award winning actress Joanne Woodward, Academy Award winning actor F. Murray Abraham, and news broadcaster Garrick Utley. The announcer was Peter Allen.

During the first few years, when the various operatic performances were distributed on video cassette and even Laserdisc, Pioneer Corporation helped sponsor the program, alongside long-time sponsors: The National Endowment for the Arts, The Corporation for Public Broadcasting, and Texaco.

Giuseppe Verdi and his operas were the most frequently performed on the program, with his creations Aida, Don Carlo, Rigoletto, Simon Boccanegra, and Un Ballo in Maschera being performed in two performances a piece, while Otello and even Wolfgang Amadeus Mozart's Don Giovanni were performed thrice (albeit seasons apart). In contrast, Georges Bizet's Carmen, Giacomo Puccini's La Boheme, Il Tabbaro, and Tosca, Richard Strauss' Elektra, Mozart's Le Nozze di Figaro, and Gaetano Donizetti's L'Elisir d'Amore were performed seasons apart on two occasions a piece.

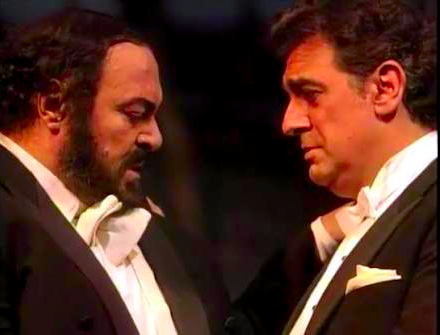
Two of the most featured tenors on Live from the Met were Luciano Pavarotti (left) and Placido Domingo (right) who performed several operas on the highly-acclaimed show, from 1977 to the late 1990s (shown here in 1996).

Celebrated singers featured on Live from the Met include Plácido Domingo (who performed in Manon Lescaut, Turandot, Tosca, Francesca da Rimini, and others), Luciano Pavarotti (in La Boheme, L'Elisir d'Amore, Ernani, Idomeneo, and others), Renata Scotto (in Manon Lescaut, Francesca da Rimini, and Il Trittico), Leontyne Price (in Aida and La Forza del Destino), Jose Carreras (in La Boheme and Bizet's Carmen), Kiri Te Kanawa (in Arabella and also Die Fledermaus), Samuel Ramey (in Carmen and others), Eva Marton (in Turandot and others), Leona Mitchell (in Ernani, Carmen, Turandot), Kathleen Battle (in Le Nozze di Figaro, L'Elisir d'Amore and others), Beverly Sills, Joan Sutherland, Marilyn Horne, Sherrill Milnes, and Renee Fleming.

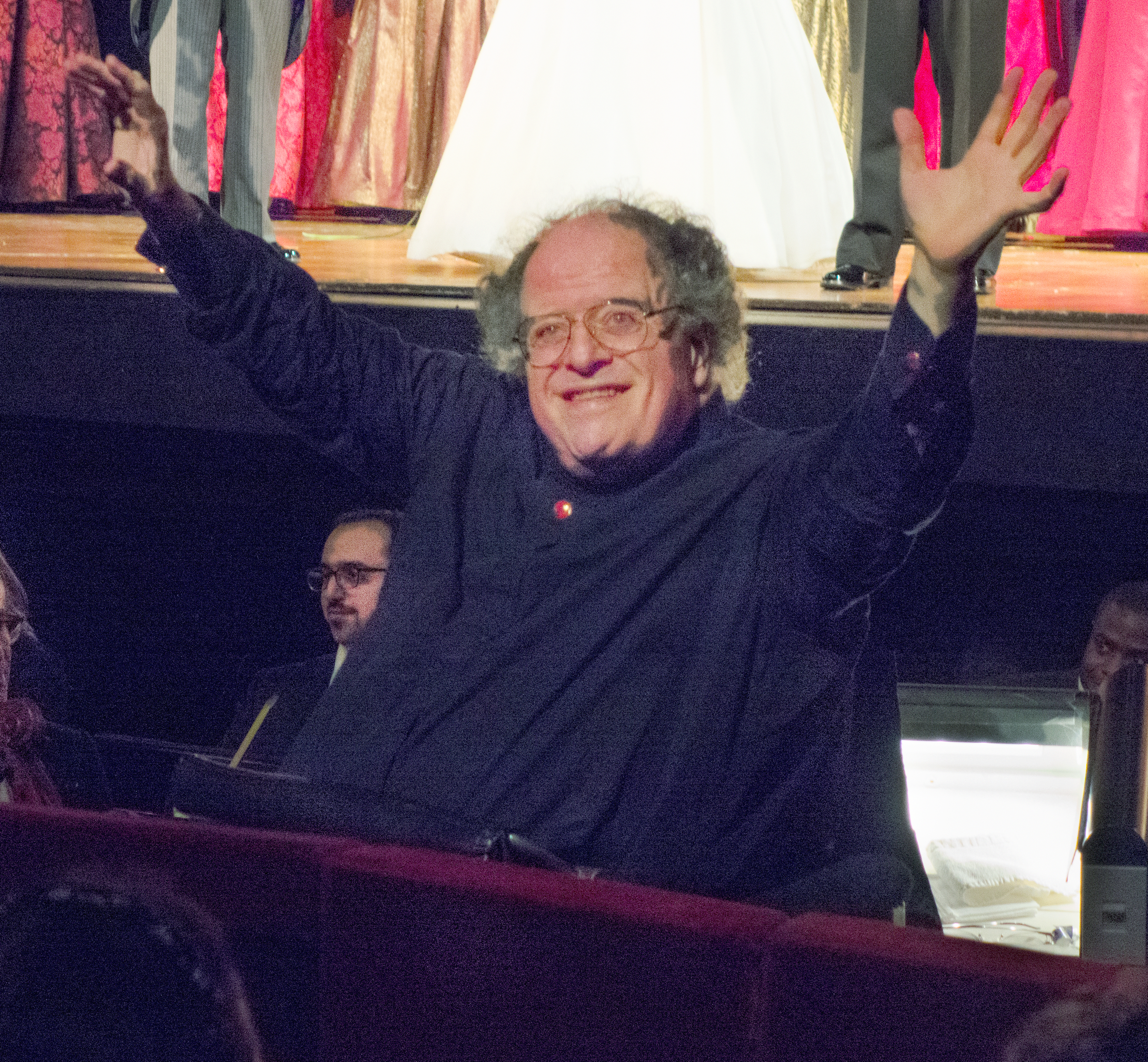
The most recognized conductor throughout Live from the Met was James Levine (shown here in 2013).

Conductors who were featured alongside Levine were: Jeffrey Tate, Giuseppe Patanè, Nicola Rescigno, Roberto Abbado, Ralf Weikert, Richard Bonynge, Daniele Gatti, Giuseppe Sinopoli, Christian Thielemann, James Conlon, Thomas Fulton, and Charles Dutoit. During the intermissions of its live broadcasts, the program offered interviews and other features on opera topics; these segments were often up to a half-hour.

From the early 1980s to the mid-1990s, there were specials focusing on the Metropolitan Opera House, recitals with Joan Sutherland and Pavarotti, and also other recitals with other notable performers, the 100th anniversary of the Metropolitan Opera, James Levine's 25th anniversary at The Met, and also Pavarotti's 30th Anniversary at The Met.

The 1982 production of La Boheme with Carreras and Scotto, along with the 1985 production of Tosca with Domingo, and the 1990 production of Aida, won the Emmy Award for Outstanding Variety Special.

In 1988, with the presentation of Turandot, the program title was changed to The Metropolitan Opera Presents to reflect the fact that the performances were now taped prior to broadcast.

The Metropolitan Opera Presents ended its 26-year run in 2003. The show was eventually replaced on PBS in 2007 by a spinoff of another long-running PBS show Great Performances, entitled Great Performances at the Met. Operas aired in this series are repeats of the performances presented live on video in movie theaters in the Met's "Live in HD" series. Not all PBS affiliate stations may carry the program.
