= Mets (surname) =

Family name

Mets is a surname of Estonian origin, meaning "Forest", and may refer to:

- Arvo Mets (1937–1997), Russian poet of Estonian descent
- Hillar Mets (born 1954), Estonian cartoonist, illustrator and animator
- Karol Mets (born 1993), Estonian footballer

== See also ==
- Gertjan De Mets (born 1987), Belgian football player
