= Károly Mátrai =

Hungarian economist

- Born: 11 May 1972 (age 54); Kalocsa, Hungary
- Education: College of Finance and Accounting
- Occupation: Economist
- Title: Chief Executive Officer, MVM Group

Károly Mátrai (11 May 1972, Kalocsa) is a Hungarian economist and energy expert with decades of professional experience in energy trading, business management, brokerage and finance. He has been the CEO of the MVM Group since 23 January 2023. With more than 19,000 employees and more than 10 million residential and corporate customers, the 100% state-owned MVM Group is Hungary's second and Central Europe's sixth largest group of companies and a key player in the Hungarian energy system.

== Studies ==
Károly Mátrai graduated from the College of Finance and Accounting with a degree in economics and also holds a stock exchange and commodity broker diploma from the Central European Brokerage Training Foundation.

== Professional experience ==
He started his career at the National Directorate General for Pensions. In 1995, he joined KELER Group as a risk analyst, where he was CFO of KELER from 2004 to 2019 and, in parallel, CEO and member of the Board of Directors of KELER KSZF, the leading capital and energy clearing house in Central and Eastern Europe, from 2008 to 2020. He was also a member of the supervisory board of the Association of Futures Markets (AFM). After leaving KELER KSZF, he joined the Swiss-based energy companyMET Group, where he worked for two years as CFO of MET Romania Energy and then as Head of Integration of Cogen Energia Espana, also part of MET Group. Károly Mátrai has been CEO of the MVM Group and member of the Board of Directors since January 2023.

== Achievements of the MVM Group ==
Under the leadership of Károly Mátrai, the MVM Group has adopted its strategy until 2035, the main objective of which is to become the leading energy player in the Central and Eastern European region. The company is taking significant steps towards international expansion and now has a dominant market position in several neighbouring countries in addition to Hungary.

The company has a presence in the Czech Republic, among other countries, where it has nearly 1.5 million customers in the retail business. MVM has achieved a 40 percent market share in the Czech gas market and aims to achieve a long-term, stable presence in all elements of the energy value chain through its investments. In Slovakia, the company currently has a 10 percent share of the institutional gas market.

The company also made a significant strategic investment in Azerbaijan, acquiring a 5 percent stake in the Shah Deniz gas field in 2024 and a 4 percent stake in a trading company established for the exclusive sale of natural gas. The company's future plans focus on strengthening its presence in the region, with a particular focus on Serbia, Romania and the Balkans.

Under the leadership of Károly Mátrai, the MVM Group achieved profits of HUF 222 billion. Also, in 2024, with a total profit of HUF 323.7 billion, the MVM Group approached its record profit of 2023. Group EBITDA of HUF 825 billion is the second highest in the company's history.

In March 2024, the MVM Group made its third successful international bond issue.

Under the leadership of Károly Mátrai, the MVM Group has introduced an integrated management system

== Affiliations ==
Károly Mátrai plays a leading role on a number of boards and advisory bodies. He is a member of the board of MVM Paks Nuclear Power Plant Zrt. He is a member of the Board of Directors of the Hungarian Hydrocarbon Stockholders Association.
