= Metropolitan Opera House (Saint Paul, Minnesota) =

Former opera house in Minnesota, United States

Coordinates: 44°56′52″N 93°5′32″W

The Metropolitan Opera House was a historic opera house in Saint Paul, Minnesota, located at 100 East Sixth Street. Plans to build the house began after the Grand Opera House burned down on January 21, 1889. Initial plans for the house were designed by Leroy Buffington, but his plans were abandoned due to insufficient funds. Business tycoon Robert Mannheimer eventually came to the rescue, providing half a million dollars towards the project. New plans by Charles A. Reed were used for the house which was built over a few months in 1890. The opera house opened for business that year and served as Saint Paul's opera venue until 1936.
