= Joe Epperson =

American camera operator (1945–2025)

- Born: Joseph Epperson; February 9, 1945; Camden, New Jersey, U.S.
- Died: June 28, 2025 (aged 80); Middleburg Heights, Ohio, U.S.
- Occupation(s): Camera operator, cinematographer
- Years active: 1975–2003, 2011–2014

Joseph Epperson (February 9, 1945 – June 28, 2025) was an American camera operator and cinematographer. He was nominated for three Primetime Emmy Awards in the category Outstanding Technical Direction and Camerawork.

Epperson died on June 28, 2025, of cardiac arrest at Southwest General Health Center in Middleburg Heights, Ohio, at the age of 80.
