= Metropolitan Opera House =

The Metropolitan Opera House may refer to:

== In the United States ==
=== New York City ===
- Metropolitan Opera House (Lincoln Center)
- Metropolitan Opera House (39th Street) ("the old Met")

=== Other US opera houses ===
- Metropolitan Opera House (Grand Forks, North Dakota)
- Metropolitan Opera House (Iowa Falls, Iowa)
- Metropolitan Opera House (Minneapolis)
- Metropolitan Opera House (Philadelphia)
- Metropolitan Opera House (Saint Paul, Minnesota)

== In other countries ==
- Metropolitan Opera House (Taichung, Taiwan), scheduled for full opening in 2016
