= Integrated chain management =

Environmental impact reduction approach

Integrated Chain Management (ICM), also known as Integral Chain Management, is an approach for the reduction of environmental impact of product chains. Such a product chain exists out of an extraction phase, a production phase, a use phase and a waste phase. The ultimate goal of ICM is a reduction of environmental load over the whole chain. Integrated Chain Management is one of the approaches that can be used to come to sustainable development. Other approaches in this line are the Ecological Footprint and the DTO approach.

Within the ICM approach all phases within the chain must be considered. Therefore, it can be seen as a "cradle to grave" approach. Several inputs and outputs can be taken into account when applying the ICM approach. Such as: Energy flows, mass flows, materials, waste flows and emissions. Within ICM material cycles should be closed where possible and the remainder flows of emissions and waste should be brought within acceptable boundaries. Also the use of resources should be kept to a minimum.

Integrated chain management should not be mixed up with Supply Chain Management or Integrated Supply Chain Management. These concepts do not have the reduction of environmental load as their main goal.

An important aspect of ICM is that shifting to other phases in the product chain is avoided. For instance, a producer of chairs can choose to leave off an environment unfriendly material in a new product. The producer can even see this as an extra selling point for the customer, but as a consequence the supplier of raw materials has to use much more energy to produce a material with the same qualities. The result of this is that there may no longer be a net environmental reduction across the whole chain. Within the integrated chain management approach this is avoided.

The chain can be managed by developing new policies and economical or political incentives. Therefore, one must have insight into the inputs and outputs of the production chain. Before these policies can be developed one must engage in several actions.

- Analyse the processes into a preferred level of detail
- Determine the boundaries of the chain. Should links outside the companies be involved as well?
- Determine whether there should be a focus on just one or on several environmental problems
- Determine on which material flows or energy flows there should be a focus.

Effective supply chain management can impact virtually all business and production processes

== Example ==
An example of applying the ICM approach would be to develop policies in a particular product area. The responsibility of problems caused by the waste stage can be assigned to the producers of these products. This leads to improved product design and new insight in how to put these products in the market. For instance the product can be sold with a disposal contribution. On the price tag of a radio nowadays can be printed: "this radio costs 25 $ not including the 3 $ disposal contribution" The effects can be seen within the whole chain. The producer will try to choose non-polluting materials, as they increase the costs of the waste-stage. The producer of raw materials will try to improve its production process in order to meet the increased demand for 'clean' primary products. And the consumer will be aware that some products give more pressure on the environment than others when its economical lifespan has run out.
