= MET Matrix =

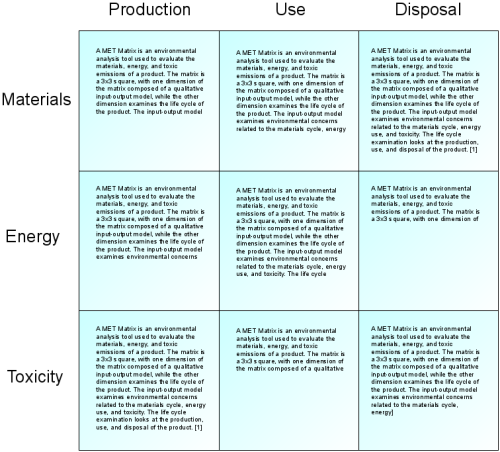
Illustration of MET Matrix with text

A MET (Materials, Energy, and Toxicity) Matrix is an analysis tool used to evaluate various environmental impacts of a product over its life cycle. The tool takes the form of a 3x3 matrix with descriptive text in each of its cells. One dimension of the matrix is composed of a qualitative input-output model that examines environmental concerns related to the product's materials use, energy use, and toxicity. The other dimension looks at the life cycle of the product through its production, use, and disposal phase. The text in each cell corresponds to the intersection of two particular aspects. For example, this means that by looking at certain cells, one can examine aspects such as energy use during the production phase, or levels of toxicity that may be a concern during the disposal phase.
