= MET Group =

Swiss-based European energy company

MET Holding AG
- Type: Joint-stock company
- Industry: Natural gas, power, renewable energy
- Founded: 2007, Hungary
- Founder: Benjamin Lakatos
- Headquarters: Baar, (Canton of Zug), Switzerland
- Area served: Europe
- Key people: Benjamin Lakatos (Executive Chairman of the Board); Huibert Vigeveno (Group CEO)
- Products: Natural gas trading and storage, electric power
- Revenue: €28.5 billion (2025)
- Owner: MET management (90%); Keppel Energy Switzerland (10%)
- Number of employees: 1,350 (2025)
- Website: met.com

MET Group is a Swiss-based European energy company. The company is organized as an unlisted joint-stock company and operates in the natural gas, electricity and liquefied natural gas (LNG) sectors. Its business areas include wholesale trading in various commodities, trading and distribution, as well as activities in the field of energy infrastructure and industrial plants. MET was founded in 2007, starting as a MOL subsidiary (Magyar Olaj- és Gázipari Nyilvánosan Működő Részvénytársaság, Hungarian Oil and Gas Public Limited Company). In 2025, MET Group's natural gas trading volume was 242 BCM.

== Corporate history ==
MET Group was founded by Benjamin Lakatos in 2007. MET Group has been present in Zug, Switzerland since 2011. In early 2016, the annual gas trading volume reached 16 BCM (3.8 mi^{3}). MET Capital Partners AG – a company owned by Benjamin Lakatos – acquired the MET stocks in a 2018 management buyout with financial capital obtained from the Dutch ING Bank. In January 2020, Keppel Energy Switzerland acquired a 20 percent stake in MET Group. Keppel Energy Switzerland and MET Group have since entered into a strategic partnership. In November 2020, MET Group bought the Frankfurt, Germany-based natural gas storage company Gas-Union GmbH. Gas Union's natural gas storage capacity equals 3.4 TWh (1.2×10^{13} BTU). In November 2022, Keppel sold half of its 20 percent stake in MET Group to MET Management. Since 2010, MET has been part of Handelszeitung's list of Switzerland's Top 500 companies by revenue. In 2022, MET placed 20th with a revenue of CHF 19.566 billion (EUR 18.1 billion). In November 2022, Lakatos was elected as Chairman of the Board of Directors.

In June 2023, MET Green Assets Holding was founded in Switzerland, which includes all MET renewable energy assets. In 2025, MET Group entered the Belgian and Dutch energy markets with the acquisition of a majority stake in energy retailer Mega, and acquired 100 percent of the shares in the German municipal gas storage company Epe (KGE). MET also entered the Portuguese, Albanian and Polish markets, bringing the total number of countries with local subsidiaries to 21.

In 2026, Huibert Vigeveno took over as Group Chief Executive Officer, while Lakatos became Executive Chairman of the MET Holding Board of Directors. Vigeveno had previously been the Executive Chairman of Shell in China and was responsible for the takeover of BG Group.

== Business activity ==
The company has two segments: Sales and Trading Segment, including Trading and Wholesale and European Sales Divisions, and Asset Segment, including Green Assets and Flexible Assets Divisions. The products are divided into the areas of natural gas, electricity, and LNG (liquefied natural gas).

=== Natural gas ===
MET Group's main business activity is the trade and wholesale of natural gas. Neue Zürcher Zeitung writes that 70 percent of the company's revenue come from natural gas sales. According to a news magazine, MET trades 12.2 percent of the total natural gas that is consumed in mainland Europe. In 2025, the company sold 242 BCM of natural gas. As of 2025, MET is present in 33 national energy markets and 44 international trading hubs. A business news site concludes that MET uses natural gas as a "transition fuel" in the transition from fossil fuel based electric power to electric power from renewable sources.

=== Electric power ===
Since 2014, MET has been operating the biggest natural gas power plant in Hungary, the Dunamenti Power Plant in Százhalombatta near Budapest. In 2018, MET Group completed the construction of a solar power plant next to the gas-fired plant. By 2025, MET Group had six operating solar power plants in Hungary. The magazine NRGreport reports that some solar power plants were financed with so-called "green bonds". The total volume of these bonds is 64.8 billion Ft (168.5 million. EUR). In early 2021, MET Group acquired the 42 MW Black Sea Wind Park in Bulgaria, followed in July by the 60 MW Suvorovo Wind Park. The latter is composed of 30 Gamesa G90 2 MW wind turbines that produce up to 120 GWh of renewable energy annually. In April 2022, MET Group announced that they signed purchase agreements to take over five early-stage greenfield photovoltaic projects in Italy, totaling an expected installed power of 213 MW_{p}. Construction began in mid-2024 and the plant went into operation in 2025. In addition to that, the company bought a 100 percent stake in a 50 MW solar project in Spain, that was commissioned in 2023.

In 2023, MET entered the German renewables market, with an acquisition of a solar development project in Mecklenburg-Vorpommern. Keppel MET Renewables, an equal joint venture between MET Group and Keppel, acquired a 100% stake in a photovoltaic project in Italy.

In June 2025, MET Group commissioned a battery storage facility in Hungary with an output of 40 megawatts and a capacity of 80 megawatt hours. As of 2025, the battery storage facility is considered the largest in the country. In October 2025, MET Group commenced commercial operations at its Ferrera Erbognone solar power plant in Italy.

=== Liquefied natural gas ===
On 1 March 2016, MET Group also began trading liquefied natural gas (LNG). The first LNG delivery arrived in port in July 2016. MET Group provides countries in South-East Europe and Mediterranean Europe with LNG.

In 2024, the company signed a long-term LNG supply contract with Shell covering U.S. exports and commissioned its first LNG vessel from Celsius Group, which is expected to be delivered in 2027.

In 2025, MET Group almost tripled its LNG cargo import volumes, delivering to 16 different markets.
