= Hillar Mets =

Estonian cartoonist

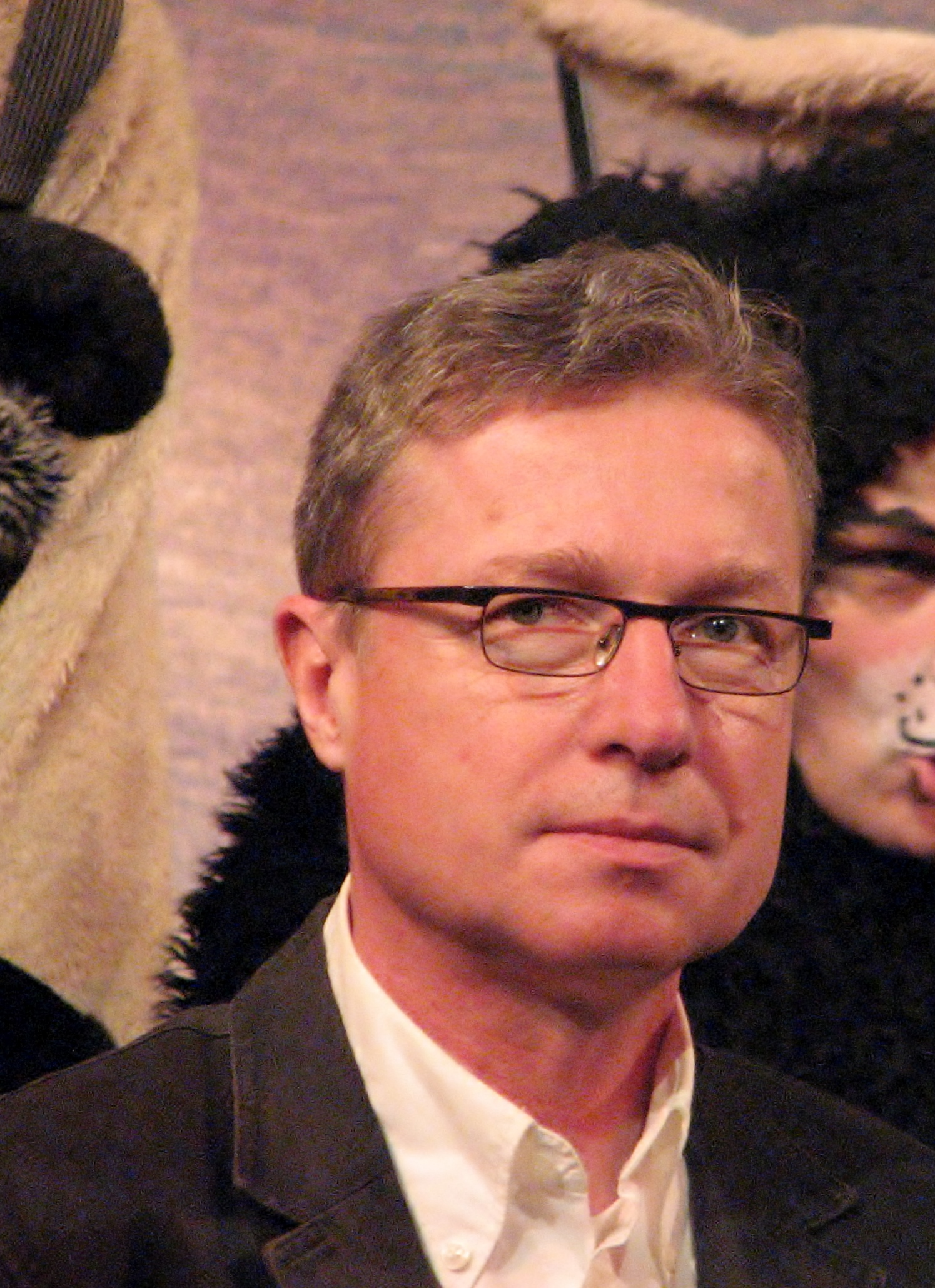
Hillar Mets in 2014

Hillar Mets (born 15 August 1954) is an Estonian cartoonist, illustrator and animator. His illustrations have been published in the publications Eesti Päevaleht, Noorus, Täheke, Põhjanael, Pikker, City Paper, Eesti Naine and Toiduproff.

His work includes more than 30 jacket illustrations for Estonian versions of the Discworld series by Terry Pratchett, published by Varrak.

== Prizes ==
- VIII Mostra Internazionale del Disegno Ancona (Italy) silver medal 1985
- Witty World cartoon contest Budapest II place 1990
- Knokke Heist (Belgium) Bronzen Hoed 1992
- SKOP-bank of Finland, first prize at a cartoon contest 1992
- Knokke Heist (Belgium) Bronzen Hoed 1993
- XII Mostra Internazionale del Disegno Ancona (Italy) silver medal 1993
- Yomiuri International Cartoon Contest (Tokyo) medal 1995
