= Environmental economics =

Sub-field of economics

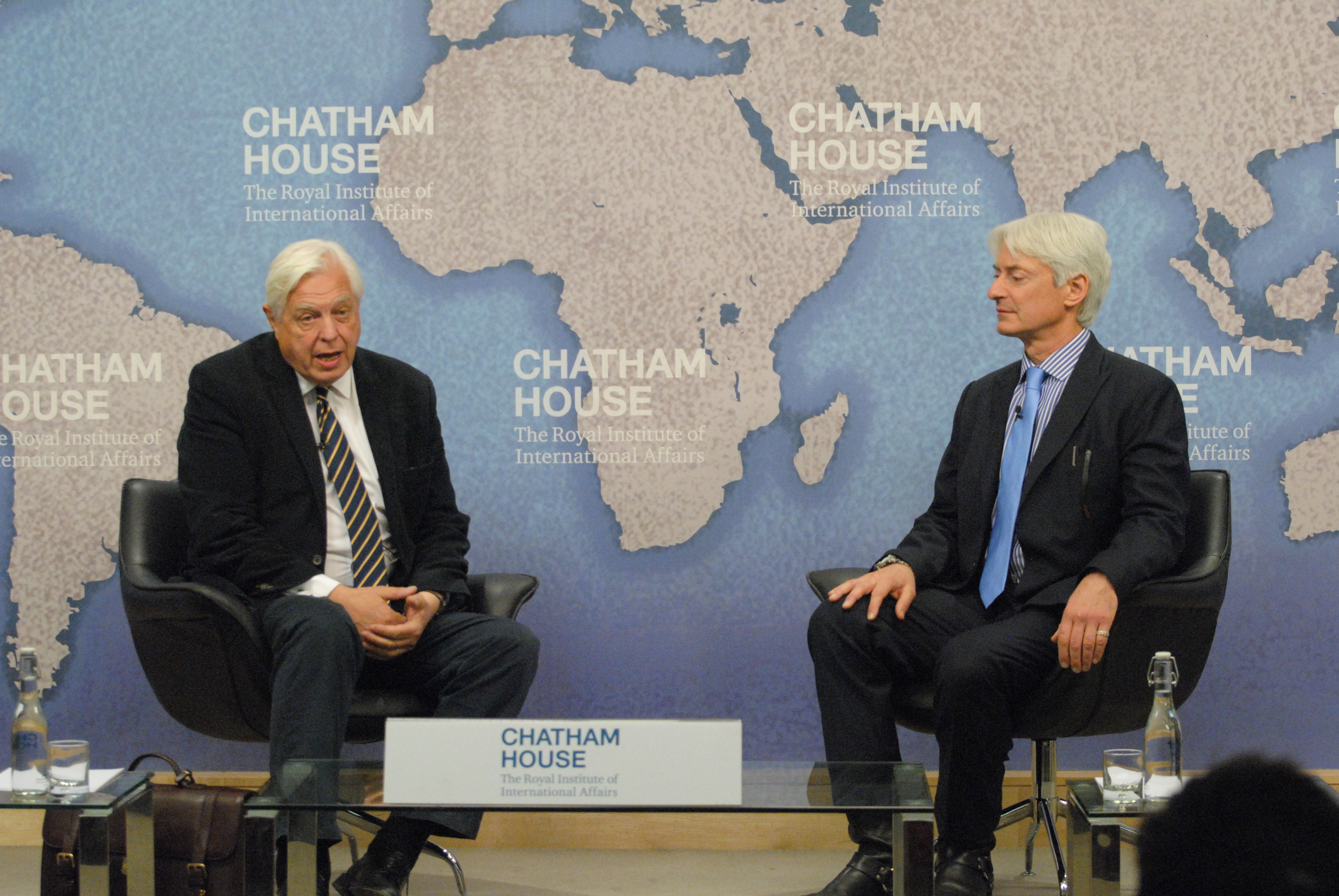
Growth, Development and Environmental Economics in Asia discussion at Chatham House, London

Environmental economics is a sub-field of economics concerned with environmental issues. It has become a widely studied subject due to growing environmental concerns in the twenty-first century. Environmental economics "undertakes theoretical or empirical studies of the economic effects of national or local environmental policies around the world. Particular issues include the costs and benefits of alternative environmental policies to deal with air pollution, water quality, toxic substances, solid waste, and global warming."

== Environmental versus ecological economics ==
Environmental economics is distinguished from ecological economics in that ecological economics emphasizes the economy as a subsystem of the ecosystem with its focus upon preserving natural capital.

One survey of German economists found that ecological and environmental economics are different schools of economic thought, with ecological economists emphasizing "strong" sustainability and rejecting the proposition that human-made ("physical") capital can substitute for natural capital.

== History ==
=== 18th and 19th centuries ===
Although the term "environmental economics" became popular beginning in the 1960s, the entwinement of the two fields of environmentalism and economics started much earlier. Starting with economist Marquis de Condorcet in the 18th century, who had an interest in the link between economic activity and environmental issues. This was seen in his usage of externalities while analyzing environmental issues.

During the classical period of economics, Adam Smith realized while the market is able to allocate private goods efficiently for most goods, it fails to do so in some environmental circumstances. It is within these scenarios where the market fails, that the government needs to take action. This is seen in his quote "Erecting and maintaining certain public works and certain public institutions which it can never be for the interest of any individual, or small number of individuals to erect and maintain; because the profit would never repay the expense to any individual or small number of individuals, though it may frequently do much more than repay it to a great society." Thomas Robert Malthus also was another classical economist whose work led to the beginnings of environmental economists. Malthus' theory of population argued that agricultural productivity faces diminishing returns, which ultimately limits the exponential growth of human populations. This thought process later led economists to think about the relationship between resource scarcity and economic development. David Ricardo's writings connected the natural environment and the standard of living which further helped to develop environmental economics later on. He stressed that the value of land varies based on how fertile it is. The last classical economist to add to environmental economics was John Stuart Mill. In his Principles of Political Economy, he wrote that the management of the environment cannot be done by the market and individuals, and is instead a governmental obligation, "[I]s there not the earth itself, its forests and waters, and all other natural riches, above and below the surface? These are the inheritance of the human race, and there must be regulations for the common enjoyment of it. What rights, and under what conditions, a person shall be allowed to exercise over any portion of this common inheritance cannot be left undecided. No function of government is less optional than the regulation of these things, or more completely involved in the idea of civilized society."

=== 20th Century ===
Environmental economics became increasingly more popular in the 19th century. This is when the Resources for the Future (RFF) was established in Washington, D.C. This independent research organization applied economics to environmental issues. During this time H. Scott Gordon released his paper "Economic Theory of a Common Property Resource: The Fishery" which claimed that open access fisheries can be exploited leading to economic rents to be dissipated. Another important paper adding to environmental economics at this time was "Spaceship Earth" by Kenneth E. Boulding. This paper describes the physical limits of earths resources and how technology cannot truly help humans push those limits. Finally, Ronald Coase created an economic solution to environmental issues, which solidified environmental economics as a sub field of economics. He believed that there were two solutions 1) to tax the creator of the polluter and to create regulation that put the burden of action on the polluter or 2) the sufferer must pay the polluter to not pollute.

== Topics and concepts ==
=== Market failure ===
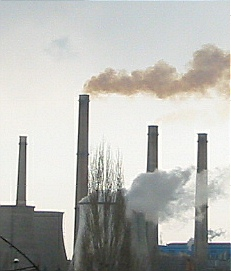
Air pollution is an example of market failure, as the factory is imposing a negative external cost on the community.

Central to environmental economics is the concept of market failure. Market failure means that markets fail to allocate resources efficiently. As stated by Hanley, Shogren, and White (2007): "A market failure occurs when the market does not allocate scarce resources to generate the greatest social welfare. A wedge exists between what a private person does given market prices and what society might want him or her to do to protect the environment. Such a wedge implies wastefulness or economic inefficiency; resources can be reallocated to make at least one person better off without making anyone else worse off." This results in an inefficient market that needs to be corrected through avenues such as government intervention. Common forms of market failure include externalities, non-excludability and non-rivalry.

=== Externality ===
An externality exists when a person makes a choice that affects other people in a way that is not accounted for in the market price. An externality can be positive or negative but is usually associated with negative externalities in environmental economics. For instance, water seepage in residential buildings occurring in upper floors affect the lower floors. Another example concerns how the sale of Amazon timber disregards the amount of carbon dioxide released in the cutting. Or a firm emitting pollution will typically not take into account the costs that its pollution imposes on others. As a result, pollution may occur in excess of the 'socially efficient' level, which is the level that would exist if the market was required to account for the pollution. A classic definition influenced by Kenneth Arrow and James Meade is provided by Heller and Starrett (1976), who define an externality as "a situation in which the private economy lacks sufficient incentives to create a potential market in some good and the nonexistence of this market results in losses of Pareto efficiency". In economic terminology, externalities are examples of market failures, in which the unfettered market does not lead to an efficient outcome.

=== Common goods and public goods ===
When it is too costly to exclude some people from access to an environmental resource, the resource is either called a common property resource (when there is rivalry for the resource, such that one person's use of the resource reduces others' opportunity to use the resource) or a public good (when use of the resource is non-rivalrous). In either case of non-exclusion, market allocation is likely to be inefficient.

These challenges have long been recognized. Hardin's (1968) concept of the tragedy of the commons popularized the challenges involved in non-exclusion and common property. "Commons" refers to the environmental asset itself, "common property resource" or "common pool resource" refers to a property right regime that allows for some collective body to devise schemes to exclude others, thereby allowing the capture of future benefit streams; and "open-access" implies no ownership in the sense that property everyone owns nobody owns.

The basic problem is that if people ignore the scarcity value of the commons, they can end up expending too much effort, over harvesting a resource (e.g., a fishery). Hardin theorizes that in the absence of restrictions, users of an open-access resource will use it more than if they had to pay for it and had exclusive rights, leading to environmental degradation. See, however, Ostrom's (1990) work on how people using real common property resources have worked to establish self-governing rules to reduce the risk of the tragedy of the commons.

The mitigation of climate change effects is an example of a public good, where the social benefits are not reflected completely in the market price. Because the personal marginal benefits are less than the social benefits the market under-provides climate change mitigation. This is a public good since the risks of climate change are both non-rival and non-excludable. Such efforts are non-rival since climate mitigation provided to one does not reduce the level of mitigation that anyone else enjoys. They are non-excludable actions as they will have global consequences from which no one can be excluded. A country's incentive to invest in carbon abatement is reduced because it can "free ride" off the efforts of other countries. Over a century ago, Swedish economist Knut Wicksell (1896) first discussed how public goods can be under-provided by the market because people might conceal their preferences for the good, but still enjoy the benefits without paying for them.

Global biochemical cycles

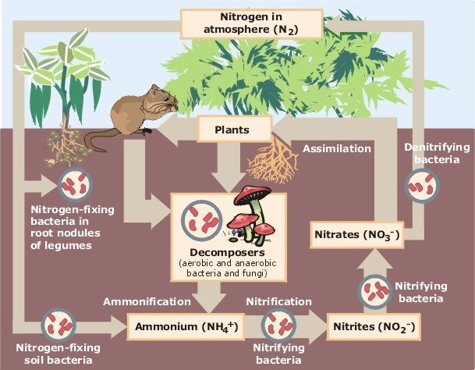
Nitrogen cycle

Water cycle

Carbon cycle

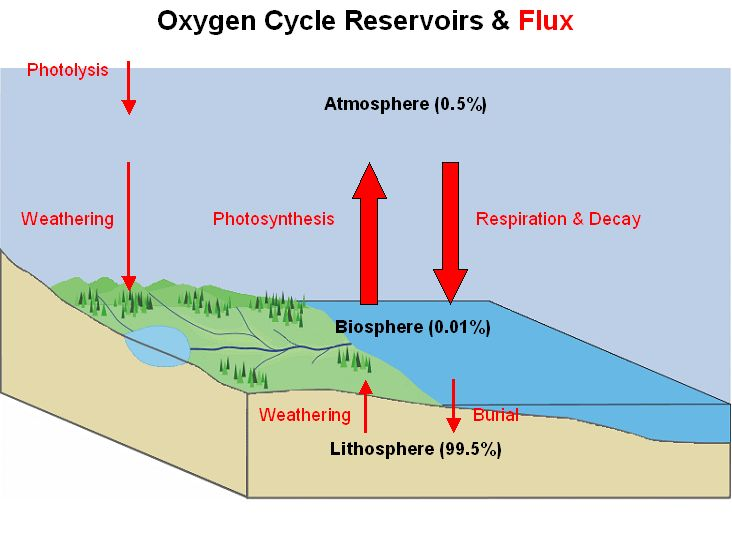
Oxygen cycle

=== Valuation ===
Assessing the economic value of the environment is a major topic within the field. The values of natural resources often are not reflected in prices that markets set and, in fact, many of them are available at no monetary charge. This mismatch frequently causes distortions in pricing of natural assets: both overuse of them and underinvestment in them. Economic value or tangible benefits of ecosystem services and, more generally, of natural resources, include both use and indirect (see the nature section of ecological economics). Non-use values include existence, option, and bequest values. For example, some people may value the existence of a diverse set of species, regardless of the effect of the loss of a species on ecosystem services. The existence of these species may have an option value, as there may be the possibility of using it for some human purpose. For example, certain plants may be researched for drugs. Individuals may value the ability to leave a pristine environment for their children.

Use and indirect use values can often be inferred from revealed behavior, such as the cost of taking recreational trips or using hedonic methods in which values are estimated based on observed prices. These use values can also be predicted through defensive behavior against pollution or environmental hazards, which can reveal how much people are willing to spend on healthcare and other preventative measures to avoid these hazards. Another health-based predictor of environmental use value is the value of a statistical life (VSL), which provides an estimate of how much people are willing to pay for small reductions in their risk of dying from environmental hazards. Non-use values are usually estimated using stated preference methods such as contingent valuation or choice modelling. Contingent valuation typically takes the form of surveys in which people are asked how much they would pay to observe and recreate in the environment (willingness to pay) or their willingness to accept (WTA) compensation for the destruction of the environmental good. Hedonic pricing examines the effect the environment has on economic decisions through housing prices, traveling expenses, and payments to visit parks.

=== State subsidy ===
Almost all governments and states magnify environmental harm by providing various types of subsidies that have the effect of paying companies and other economic actors more to exploit natural resources than to protect them. The damage to nature of such public subsidies has been conservatively estimated at $4-$6 trillion U.S. dollars per year.

The largest of these subsidies support the fossil fuel, agriculture, and water sectors.

== Solutions ==
Solutions advocated to correct such externalities include:

- Environmental regulations. Under this plan, the economic impact has to be estimated by the regulator. Usually, this is done using cost–benefit analysis. There is a growing realization that regulations (also known as "command and control" instruments) are not so distinct from economic instruments as is commonly asserted by proponents of environmental economics. E.g.1 regulations are enforced by fines, which operate as a form of tax if pollution rises above the threshold prescribed. E.g.2 pollution must be monitored and laws enforced, whether under a pollution tax regime or a regulatory regime. The main difference an environmental economist would argue exists between the two methods, however, is the total cost of the regulation. "Command and control" regulation often applies uniform emissions limits on polluters, even though each firm has different costs for emissions reductions, i.e., some firms, in this system, can abate pollution inexpensively, while others can only abate it at high cost. Because of this, the total abatement in the system comprises some expensive and some inexpensive efforts. Consequently, modern "Command and control" regulations are oftentimes designed in a way that addresses these issues by incorporating utility parameters. For instance, CO_{2} emission standards for specific manufacturers in the automotive industry are either linked to the average vehicle footprint (US system) or average vehicle weight (EU system) of their entire vehicle fleet. Environmental economic regulations find the cheapest emission abatement efforts first, and then move on to the more expensive methods. E.g. as said earlier, trading, in the quota system, means a firm only abates pollution if doing so would cost less than paying someone else to make the same reduction. This leads to a lower cost for the total abatement effort as a whole.
- Quotas on pollution. Often it is advocated that pollution reductions should be achieved by way of tradeable emissions permits, which if freely traded may ensure that reductions in pollution are achieved at least cost. In theory, if such tradeable quotas are allowed, then a firm would reduce its own pollution load only if doing so would cost less than paying someone else to make the same reduction, i.e., only if buying tradeable permits from another firm(s) is costlier. These tradeable permit approaches can also, in theory, improve economic efficiency and cost-effectiveness while increasing government revenue through the use of permit auctions instead of grandfathering practices. This entails the government selling off a certain number of these tradeable permits, allowing the government to capture the value of emissions and use it to reduce marginal tax rates. In practice, tradeable permits approaches have had some success, such as the U.S.'s sulphur dioxide trading program or the EU Emissions Trading Scheme, and interest in its application is spreading to other environmental problems.
- Taxes and tariffs on pollution. Increasing the costs of polluting will discourage polluting, and will provide a "dynamic incentive", that is, the disincentive continues to operate even as pollution levels fall. A pollution tax that reduces pollution to the socially "optimal" level would be set at such a level that pollution occurs only if the benefits to society (for example, in form of greater production) exceeds the costs. This concept was introduced by Arthur Pigou, a British economist active in the late nineteenth through the mid-twentieth century. He showed that these externalities occur when markets fail, meaning they do not naturally produce the socially optimal amount of a good or service. He argued that “a tax on the production of paint would encourage the [polluting] factory to reduce production to the amount best for society as a whole.” These taxes are known amongst economists as Pigouvian Taxes, and they are regularly implemented where negative externalities are present. Some advocate a major shift from taxation from income and sales taxes to tax on pollution – the so-called "green tax shift".
- Better defined property rights. The Coase Theorem states that assigning property rights will lead to an optimal solution, regardless of who receives them, if transaction costs are trivial and the number of parties negotiating is limited. For example, if people living near a factory had a right to clean air and water, or the factory had the right to pollute, then either the factory could pay those affected by the pollution or the people could pay the factory not to pollute. Or, citizens could take action themselves as they would if other property rights were violated. The US River Keepers Law of the 1880s was an early example, giving citizens downstream the right to end pollution upstream themselves if the government itself did not act (an early example of bioregional democracy). Many markets for "pollution rights" have been created in the late twentieth century—see emissions trading. Supply-side environmental policy implements efficiency by letting countries that are affected by climate change "buy coal" or other fossil fuel reserves abroad with the intention of conserving them: Bohm (1993); Harstad (2012). According to the Coase Theorem, the involved parties will bargain with each other, which results in an efficient solution. However, modern economic theory has shown that the presence of asymmetric information may lead to inefficient bargaining outcomes. Specifically, Rob (1989) has shown that pollution claim settlements will not lead to the socially optimal outcome when the individuals that will be affected by pollution have learned private information about their disutility already before the negotiations take place. Goldlücke and Schmitz (2018) have shown that inefficiencies may also result if the parties learn their private information only after the negotiations, provided that the feasible transfer payments are bounded. Using cooperative game theory, Gonzalez, Marciano and Solal (2019) have shown that in social cost problems involving more than three agents, the Coase theorem suffers from many counterexamples and that only two types of property rights lead to an optimal solution.
- Accounting for environmental externalities in the final price. In fact, the world's largest industries burn about $7.3 trillion of free natural capital per year. Thus, the world's largest industries would hardly be profitable if they had to pay for this destruction of natural capital. Trucost has assessed over 100 direct environmental impacts and condensed them into 6 key environmental performance indicators (EKPIs). The assessment of environmental impacts is derived from different sources (academic journals, governments, studies, etc.) due to the lack of market prices. The table below gives an overview of the 5 regional sectors per EKPI with the highest impact on the overall EKPI:

Ranking of the 5 region-sectors by EKPI with the greatest impact across all EKPIs when measured in monetary terms
Rank	IMPACT	SECTOR	REGION	NATURAL CAPITAL COST$, BN	REVENU$, BN	IMPACT RATIO
1	GHG	Coal Power Generation	Eastern Asia	361.0	443.1	0.8
2	Land Use	Cattle Ranching and Farming	South America	312.1	16.6	18.7
3	GHG	Iron and Steel Mills	Eastern Asia	216.1	604.7	0.4
4	Water	Wheat Farming	Southern Asia	214.4	31.8	6.7
5	GHG	Coal Power Generation	Northern America	201.0	246.7	0.8

If companies are allowed to include some of these externalities in their final prices, this could undermine the Jevons paradox and provide enough revenue to help companies innovate.

== Relationship to other fields ==
Environmental economics is related to ecological economics but there are differences. Most environmental economists have been trained as economists. They apply the tools of economics to address environmental problems, many of which are related to so-called market failures—circumstances wherein the "invisible hand" of economics is unreliable. Most ecological economists have been trained as ecologists, but have expanded the scope of their work to consider the impacts of humans and their economic activity on ecological systems and services, and vice versa. This field takes as its premise that economics is a strict subfield of ecology. Ecological economics is sometimes described as taking a more pluralistic approach to environmental problems and focuses more explicitly on long-term environmental sustainability and issues of scale.

Environmental economics is viewed as more idealistic in a price system; ecological economics as more realistic in its attempts to integrate elements outside of the price system as primary arbiters of decisions. These two groups of specialisms sometimes have conflicting views which may be traced to the different philosophical underpinnings.

Another context in which externalities apply is when globalization permits one player in a market who is unconcerned with biodiversity to undercut prices of another who is – creating a race to the bottom in regulations and conservation. This, in turn, may cause loss of natural capital with consequent erosion, water purity problems, diseases, desertification, and other outcomes that are not efficient in an economic sense. This concern is related to the subfield of sustainable development and its political relation, the anti-globalization movement.

The three pillars of sustainability (clickable)

Environmental economics was once distinct from resource economics. Natural resource economics as a subfield began when the main concern of researchers was the optimal commercial exploitation of natural resource stocks. But resource managers and policy-makers eventually began to pay attention to the broader importance of natural resources (e.g. values of fish and trees beyond just their commercial exploitation). It is now difficult to distinguish "environmental" and "natural resource" economics as separate fields as the two became associated with sustainability. Many of the more radical green economists split off to work on an alternate political economy.

Environmental economics was a major influence on the theories of natural capitalism and environmental finance, which could be said to be two sub-branches of environmental economics concerned with resource conservation in production, and the value of biodiversity to humans, respectively. The theory of natural capitalism (Hawken, Lovins, Lovins) goes further than traditional environmental economics by envisioning a world where natural services are considered on par with physical capital.

The more radical green economists reject neoclassical economics in favour of a new political economy beyond capitalism or communism that gives a greater emphasis to the interaction of the human economy and the natural environment, acknowledging that "economy is three-fifths of ecology". This political group is a proponent of a transition to renewable energy.

These more radical approaches would imply changes to money supply and likely also a bioregional democracy so that political, economic, and ecological "environmental limits" were all aligned, and not subject to the arbitrage normally possible under capitalism.

An emerging sub-field of environmental economics studies its intersection with development economics. Dubbed "envirodevonomics" by Michael Greenstone and B. Kelsey Jack in their paper "Envirodevonomics: A Research Agenda for a Young Field", the sub-field is primarily interested in studying "why environmental quality [is] so poor in developing countries." A strategy for better understanding this correlation between a country's GDP and its environmental quality involves analyzing how many of the central concepts of environmental economics, including market failures, externalities, and willingness to pay, may be complicated by the particular problems facing developing countries, such as political issues, lack of infrastructure, or inadequate financing tools, among many others.

In the field of law and economics, environmental law is studied from an economic perspective. The economic analysis of environmental law studies instruments such as zoning, expropriation, licensing, third party liability, safety regulation, mandatory insurance, and criminal sanctions. A book by Michael Faure (2003) surveys this literature.

== Professional bodies ==
The main academic and professional organizations for the discipline of Environmental Economics are the Association of Environmental and Resource Economists (AERE) and the European Association for Environmental and Resource Economics (EAERE). The main academic and professional organization for the discipline of Ecological Economics is the International Society for Ecological Economics (ISEE). The main organization for Green Economics is the Green Economics Institute.

== See also ==
- Agroecology
- Carbon fee and dividend
- Carbon finance
- Carbon negative fuel
- Circular economy
- Earth Economics (policy think tank)
- Eco-capitalism
- Eco commerce
- Economics of global warming
- Ecometrics
- Eco-Money
- Eco-socialism
- Ecosystem Marketplace
- Ecotax
- Energy balance
- Environmental accounting
- Environmental economists (category)
- Environmental enterprise
- Environmental Investment Organisation
- Environmental pricing reform
- Environmental tariff
- Fair trade
- Fiscal environmentalism
- Free-market environmentalism
- Green banking
- Green libertarianism
- Green syndicalism
- Green trading
- Gross domestic product § Further criticisms
- ISO 14000 (environmental standards)
- List of scholarly journals in environmental economics
- Natural capital
- Natural resource
- Natural resource economics
- Principles of ecopreneurship
- Property rights (economics)
- Renewable resource
- Risk assessment
- Strategic Sustainable Investing (SSI)
- Systems ecology
- World Ecological Forum

=== Hypotheses and theorems ===
- Coase theorem
- Porter hypothesis
