= Project Appraisal and Valuation of the Environment =

1996 book by Peter Abelson

- Author: Peter Abelson
- Language: English
- Subject: Environmental economics, cost–benefit analysis
- Publisher: Macmillan Press (UK); St. Martin's Press (US)
- Publication date: 1996
- Publication place: United Kingdom
- Media type: Print (hardcover)
- Pages: 304
- ISBN: 978-0-333-63916-0
- Dewey Decimal: 333.7/09172/4
- LC Class: HC59.72.E44 A24 1996

Project Appraisal and Valuation of the Environment: General Principles and Six Case-Studies in Developing Countries is a 1996 book by the economist Peter Abelson on the economic valuation of environmental costs and benefits within cost–benefit analysis.

The Overseas Development Institute commissioned the book with funding from the British Overseas Development Administration, which also chose the case study material. Abelson develops the economic valuation methods, then applies them to six actual or proposed development projects in China, Bangladesh, India, Nigeria, Kenya and Bolivia. He found most of the usable evidence in ordinary product, property and labour markets. A consultancy's time and budget ruled out survey methods such as contingent valuation.

== Summary ==
The book falls into two parts.

In the first part, Abelson provides an overview of international environmental issues and cost-benefit analysis, and of the principles and practice of valuation methods. The environmental issues include water pollution and scarcity, outdoor and indoor air pollution, solid and hazardous waste, urban congestion, soil loss, deforestation and species loss. The cost figures come from OECD and World Bank surveys. Abelson adopts the Bank's definition of the environment as "the natural and social conditions surrounding all mankind, and including future generations". He sorts impacts by their consequences for productivity, health and amenity, and treats ecological change as an intermediate effect that "does not warrant a separate cost, or benefit, classification".

Abelson argues that environmental effects belong inside cost–benefit analysis, not in a separate class of their own. Net present value is the decision criterion, willingness to pay the measure of value. He sets social time preference against social opportunity cost as the discount rate, and covers uncertainty and option values. Costs and benefits should not be weighted by the income of those who bear them. In one chapter, the author deals with shadow pricing in economies with controlled prices and overvalued exchange rates. In another, he runs through the valuation techniques: product, property and labour market data, hedonic price analysis, travel cost models, defensive and averting expenditures, contingent valuation and ranking. For each, Abelson gives the assumptions and the ways it may go wrong. To the objection that environmental goods should not be priced at all, he replies that the alternatives price them anyway and hide it: "Without a common numeraire of value there is no basis for comparing environmental and other values, or even different environmental goods."

The second part of the book describes six cost-benefit appraisals and the impact of environmental valuation to each case. Abelson splits a wastewater programme for the Chinese city of Wuxi into its components. Cleaner canal water is valued from savings to the municipal water company and to industry, gains to fish farms, and lower household spending on water filters and mosquito control. Imputed rents cover reduced odour and discoloration, and the price of a swim at a public pool supplies one more figure. Collecting the wastewater pays for itself; the treatment works downstream does not. He takes this as an argument for appraising components separately. A retrospective evaluation of electricity investment in Bangladesh values new supply at the price of the paraffin and diesel it displaces. Stolen electricity, more than a quarter of output, counts as a benefit at half the tariff. Air pollution and global warming get rough figures. A country contributing so little to carbon emissions, Abelson holds, has no equitable reason to charge itself for them. For slum improvement in Visakhapatnam he uses recorded land valuations and house prices in the upgraded settlements. Wages after vocational training supply a second measure, and health centre unit costs are compared with private doctors' fees.

A proposed railway for Lagos is costed to include relocating some 20,000 market stallholders from the corridor, the severance caused by a 26-kilometre security wall, and construction delays. Against these stand travel time savings, fewer accidents and modest air quality gains. The return is 8.7 per cent, which Abelson calls highly marginal. Most forest extraction in Kenya was illegal. Conservation plans for Kakamega and Arabuko Sokoke yield lower quantified benefits than either continued depletion or conversion to farmland. The case for keeping the forests therefore rests on biodiversity and existence values. Nobody had measured these, and they apply largely outside Kenya. The final case study, written with Penny Davies, models twenty-five years of peasant slash-and-burn cultivation and large-scale mechanised soya farming in the lowlands of eastern Bolivia. The smallholding fails around the twentieth year unless the family moves into livestock or coca. The commercial farm stays profitable despite falling yields.

In a final chapter, Abelson reviews the results across the six studies and two further assignments in Egypt and Kenya in which he took part. Productivity effects were the largest and the easiest to value benefit everywhere other than the Indian slums. Health effects were limited by the absence of local evidence linking pollution to disease. Amenity mattered less to poor households than food, housing and electricity. Because environmental effects lie outside markets, the literature expects them to need non-market techniques. Abelson found the opposite. Ordinary market and proxy prices supplied most of the evidence, and defensive expenditures were often serviceable. Contingent valuation and travel cost methods were not helpful. Contingent valuation surveys need more preparation than a consultancy allows, and yield little where property rights or the distribution of income are contested. He defends transferring values from studies elsewhere, adjusted for income, as better than leaving impacts unquantified. Appraisal, he ends, presupposes open government and competent administration. Inefficient management turned up at every site he studied.

== Critics ==
Jay A. Leitch found that “in roughly 280 pages of easy-to-read text the author introduces, describes and, to various degrees, demonstrates every concept, principle and method found in contemporary environmental economics literature… The first four chapters lay the foundation for project appraisal, followed by six case study chapters that give readers an appreciation for both the usefulness and the complexities of cost-benefit analysis...” “The book is practical, pragmatic and applied. It alerts readers to areas where there may be unresolved issues among economists and between economists and other scientists or practitioners. The greatest contribution of this book is the demonstration that appraisals can and should continue regardless of data richness or other limitations that may constrain purists. It simply requires some creativity combined with a sound grap of the issues and economic concepts. The basic message is that economics can provide a mechanism for consistent, comparable analyses for addressing enviormental and social issues. In summary, Abelson does an excellent job demonstrating cost-benefit analysis, its usefulness and its complexities”.

K. G. Willis wrote that the author “is to be congratulated for providing such a succinct description of CBA and environmental valuation methods” in the opening chapters. While these chapters would not be new to professional economists, students, policy makers and environmental scientists unfamiliar with this area of social science should find these chapters an extremely useful introduction and overview to these techniques. Turning to the case studies, Willis notes that the valuation methods were constrained by the consultancy (limited time) nature of the work. Thus valuations tended to be based on production function methods and use values adopted from related studies. Nevertheless, “Peter Abelson has done a remarkable job in describing the case studies and documenting the results. The book is eminently readable.” The opening chapters would not provide anything new to professional economists, but he found that these chapters would provide a useful introduction and overview for students, policy makers and environmental scientists unfamiliar with the field.
