= Environmental standard =

Norms of environmental good practice which must be observed by business entities

Environmental standards are administrative regulations, practices, or legal rules implemented for the treatment and maintenance of the environment. Environmental standards are typically set by government and can include prohibition of specific activities, mandating the frequency and methods of monitoring, and requiring permits for the use of land or water. Standards differ depending on the type of environmental activity.

Environmental standards may be used produce quantifiable and enforceable laws that promote environmental protection. The basis for the standards is determined by scientific opinions from varying disciplines, the views of the general population, and social context. As a result, the process of determining and implementing the standards is complex and is usually set within legal, administrative or private contexts.

The human environment is distinct from the natural environment. The concept of the human environment considers that humans are permanently interlinked with their surroundings, which are not just the natural elements (air, water, and soil), but also culture, communication, co-operation, and institutions. Environmental standards should preserve nature and the environment, protect against damage, and repair past damage caused by human activity.

== Development of environmental standards ==
Historically, the development of environmental standards was influenced by two competing ideologies: ecocentrism and anthropocentrism. Ecocentrism frames the environment as having an intrinsic value divorced from the human utility, while anthropocentrism frames the environment as only having value if it helps humanity survive. This has led to problems in establishing standards.

In recent decades, the popularity and awareness of environmentalism has increased with the threat of global warming becoming more alarming than ever since the IPCC released their report in 2018. The report asserts that based on scientific evidence "if human activities continue to at this rate it is predicted to increase in-between 1.5-2 °C over pre industrial levels in-between 2030 and 2052". Busby argues that Climate change will define this century and that it is no longer a faraway threat. In turn, the demand for protecting the environment has risen. Developments in science have been fundamental for the setting of environmental standards. Improved measurements and techniques have allowed scientists to better understand the impact of human-caused environmental damage on human health and the biodiversity which composes the natural environment.

Therefore, environmental standards in modern times are set with the view that humans do have obligations toward the environment, but they can be justified in terms of obligations toward other humans. This means it is possible to value the environment without discarding anthropocentrism. Sometimes called prudential or enlightened anthropocentrism. This is evident as environmental standards often characterize the desired state (e.g. the pH of a lake should be between 6.5 and 7.5) or limit alterations (e.g., no more than 50% of the natural forest may be damaged). Statistical methods are used to determine the specific states and limits the enforceable environmental standard.

Penalties and other procedures for dealing with regions out of compliance with the standard may be part of the legislation.

== Governmental institutions setting environmental standards ==
Environmental standards are set by many different institutions.

=== United Nations (UN) ===
The UN, with 193 member states, is the largest intergovernmental organization. The environmental policy of the UN has a huge impact on the setting of international environmental standards. At the Earth summit in 1992, held in Rio, the member states acknowledged their negative impact on the environment for the first time. During this and the following Millennium Declaration, the first development goals for environmental issues were set.

Since then, the risk of the catastrophe caused by extreme weather has been enhanced by the overuse of natural resources and global warming. At the Paris Agreement in 2015, the UN determined 17 Goals for sustainable development. Besides the fight against global poverty, the main focus of the goals is the preservation of our planet. These goals set a baseline for global environmentalism. The environmental areas of water, energy, oceans, ecosystems, sustainable production, consumer behavior and climate protection were covered by the goals. The goals contained explanations on which mediums were required to reach them. Implementation and follow-up are controlled by non-enforceable voluntary national reviews. The main control is done by statistical values, which are called indicators. These indicators deliver information if the goals are reached.

=== European Union ===
Within the Treaty on the Functioning of the European Union, the Union integrates a self-commitment towards the environment. In Title XX, Article 191.1, it is settled: "Union policy on the environment shall contribute to the pursuit of the following objectives: — preserving, protecting and improving the quality of the environment, — protecting human health, — prudent and rational utilization of natural resources, — promoting measures at international level to deal with regional or worldwide environmental; problems, and in particular combating climate change." All environmental actions are based on this article and lead to a suite of environmental laws. European environmental regulation covers air, biotechnological, chemical, climate change, environmental economics, health, industry and technology, land use, nature and biodiversity, noise, protection of the ozone layer, soil, sustainable development, waste, and water.

The European Environment Agency (EEA) consults the member states about environmental issues, including standards.

The environmental standards set by European legislation include precise parametric concentrations of pollutants and also includes target environmental concentrations to be achieved by specific dates.

=== United States ===
In the United States, the development of standards is decentralized. These standards were developed by more than a hundred different institutions, many of which are private. The method of handling environmental standards is a partly fragmented plural system, which is mainly affected by the market. Under the first Trump administration, climate standards increasingly became a site of conflict in the politics of global warming.

==== Ambient air quality standards ====
The National Ambient Air Quality Standards (NAAQS) are set by the Environmental Protection Agency (EPA) to regulate pollutants in the air. The enforcement of these standards is designed to prevent further degradation of air quality.

States may set their own ambient standards, so long as they are lower than the national standard. The NAAQS regulates the six criteria for air pollutants: sulfur dioxide (SO_{2}), particulate matter (PM_{10}), carbon monoxide (CO), ozone (O_{3}), nitrogen dioxide (NO_{2}), and lead (Pb). To ensure that the ambient standards are met, the EPA uses the Federal Reference Method (FRM) and Federal Equivalent Method (FEM) systems to measure the number of pollutants in the air and check that they are within the legal limits.

==== Air emission standards ====
Emission standards are national regulations managed by the EPA that control the amount and concentration of pollutants that can be released into the atmosphere to maintain air quality, human health, and regulate the release of greenhouse gases such as carbon dioxide (CO_{2}), oxides of nitrogen and oxides of sulfur.

The standards are established in two phases to stay up-to-date, with final projections aiming to collectively save Americans $1.7 trillion in fuel costs and reduce the amount of greenhouse gas emissions (GHG) by 6 billion metric tons. Similar to the ambient standards, individuals states may also tighten regulations. For example, California set their own emissions standards through the California Air Resources Board (CARB), and these standards have been adopted by some other states. Emission standards also regulate the number of pollutants released by heavy industry and for electricity.

The technological standards set by the EPA do not necessarily enforce the use of specific technologies, but set minimum performance levels for different industries. The EPA often encourages technological improvement by setting standards that are not achievable with current technologies. These standards are always set based on the industry's top performers to promote the overall improvement of the industry as a whole.

== Impact of non-governmental organizations on environmental standards ==
=== International Organization of Standardization ===
The International Organization of Standardization (ISO) develops a large number of voluntary standards. With 163 member states, it has a comprehensive outreach. The standards set by the ISO were often transmitted into national standards by different nations. About 363,000 companies and organizations worldwide have the ISO 14001 certificate, a standard for environmental management created to improve the environmental performance of an organization and legal aspects as well as reaching environmental aims. Most of the national and international environmental management standards include the ISO 14000 series. In light of the UN Sustainable Development Goals, ISO has identified several families of standards which help meet SDG 13 which is focused on Climate Action for global warming.

=== Greenpeace ===
Greenpeace is a popular non-governmental organization that deals with biodiversity and the environment. Their activities have had a great global impact on environmental issues. Greenpeace encourages public attention and enforces governments or companies to adapt and set environmental standards through activities recording special environmental issues. Their main focus is on forests, the sea, climate change, and toxic chemicals. For example, the organization set a standard about toxic chemicals together with the textiles sector, creating the concept 2020, which plans to banish all toxic chemicals from textile production by 2020.

=== World Wildlife Fund ===
The World Wide Fund is an international non-governmental organization founded in 1961 that works in the field of wilderness preservation and the reduction of human impact on the environment.

== Economy ==
Environmental standards in the economy are set through external motivation. First, companies need to fulfill the environmental law of the countries in which they operate. Moreover, environmental standards are based on voluntary self-commitment which means companies implement standards for their business. These standards should exceed the level of the requirements of governmental regulations. If companies set further-reaching standards, they try to fulfill the wishes of stakeholders.

At the process of setting environmental standards, three different stakeholders have the main influence. The first stakeholder, the government, is the strongest determinate, followed by the influence of the customers. Nowadays, there is an increasing number of people, who consider environmental factors during their purchasing decision. The third stakeholder who forces companies to set environmental standards is industrial participants. If companies are part of industrial networks, they are forced to fulfill the codes of conduct of these networks. This code of conduct is often set to improve the collective reputation of an industry. Another driving force of industry participants could be a reaction to a competitors action.

The environmental standards set by companies themselves can be divided into two dimensions: operational environmental policies and the message sent in advertising and public communications.

=== Operational environmental policies ===
This can be the environmental management, audits, controls, or technologies. In this dimension, the regulations tend to be closely connected with other function areas, e.g. lean production. Furthermore, it could be understood that multinational companies tend to set cross-country harmonized environmental government regulations and therefore reach a higher performance level of environmental standards.

It is often argued that companies focus on the second dimension: the message sent in advertising and public communications. To satisfy the stakeholders' requirement, companies were focused on the public impression of their environmental self-commitment standards. Often the real implementation does not play an important role.

A lot of companies settle the responsibility for the implementation of low-budget departments. The workers, who were in charge of the standards missing time and financial resources to guarantee a real implementation. Furthermore, within the implementation, goal conflicts arise. The biggest concern of companies is that environmental protection is more expansive compared to the gained beneficial effects. But, there are a lot of positive cost-benefit-calculation for environmental standards set by companies themselves. It is observed that companies often set environmental standards after a public crisis. Sometimes environmental standards were already set by companies to avoid public crises. As to whether environmental self-commitment standards are effective, is controversial.

== See also ==
- Environmental compliance
- Emission standard
- Fairtrade certification
- Environmental certification
- Environmental data
- Environmental monitoring
- Environmental performance
- Environmental law
