= Esdat =

ESdat is a data management, analysis and reporting software for environmental and groundwater data, developed by EarthScience Information Systems (EScIS). It is used to manage many types of environmental data including laboratory chemistry (analytical results, QA data, lab sample planning, and electronic Chain of Custody), field chemistry (water, gas, and soil), hydrogeological data (groundwater, borehole and well construction, lithological, geotechnical and stratigraphic, and LNAPL), meteorological data (rain, wind, and temperature), emission data (dust deposition, HiVol, air quality, and noise) and logger data.

Data can be compared against environmental standards or site-specific trigger levels to generate exceedence tables, time series graphs, maps, statistics, and other outputs. ESdat integrates with Power BI and ArcGIS and data can also be exported in a range of other database formats, including USEPA Regions 2,4 & 5, and NYS DEC.

ESdat is used by environmental consultants, government, mining and industry for validation, interrogation, and reporting of data derived from complex environmental programs, such as contaminated sites, groundwater investigations, and regulatory compliance for landfills or mining operations.
