= Siegfried von Ciriacy-Wantrup =

American economist

- Born: 1906; Langenberg, Germany
- Died: 1980 (aged 73–74)

Academic background
- Education: University of Bonn

Academic work
- Discipline: natural resource management
- Notable works: Resource Conservation, Economics and Policies

Siegfried von Ciriacy-Wantrup was a German academic.

== Personal life ==
He was born in Langenberg, Germany in 1906. After doing his master's work in Illinois, he returned to Bonn to get his Ph.D. in 1931. In 1936, he left Nazi Germany for the United States, arriving at UC Berkeley and the Department of Agricultural and Resource Economics in 1938. He died in 1980 at the Men's Faculty Club.

== Academic work ==
He was a Fellow of the National Academy, IAS, AAAS, AAEA, Rockefeller, Guggenheim. He conducted international work on marine resources and other areas, in particular studies of Tule Elk, California Condor, and marine mammals. He testified on and shaped state and federal conservation policy. Wantrup did early work on natural resource management, contributing important concepts related to resource economics and policy. Wantrup derived criteria for sustainability that included the "Safe Minimum Standard" (the threshold below which loss is catastrophic), irreversibility, and unknown future probability (Option Value). He also wrote on "Common Property" and the "Extramarket Values" of collective goods.

As early as 1938 he addressed the idea of "permanency of destructive exploitation" in his article "Economic Aspects of Land Conservation." In his main work, Resource Conservation, Economics and Policies (1952), he introduced the idea that natural resources should not be allowed to decline below a "safe minimum standard of conservation" beyond which their availability would become economically irreversible. This idea was later expanded on by others, including Richard C. Bishop. Wantrup's idea of a safe minimum standard or base level for each flow resource provides an economic rationale for biodiversity conservation which can be applied internationally.

Of particular interest is Wantrup's notion of three decision levels: At the highest level is basic law (e.g., the constitution), which affects the second-level decisions on how to form institutions (e.g., water organizations). These institutions—in turn—affect third-level decisions of how to allocate water (e.g., among crops or within an urban sector). Wantrup points out that economists who critique decisions at the third level are perhaps missing the importance of constraints or influence coming from the second level. His critique, which dates from the 1960s, is still relevant—economists still spend most of their time on optimal decisions without taking institutions into account. In taking his institutional approach, Wantrup discussed and integrated common property, the impacts of tenure rights on conservation, the Precautionary Principle, conservation land use planning, and the importance of endangered species and biodiversity.

== Legacy ==
Ciriacy-Wantrup left a sizable bequest to the University of California that is used to fund the "S.V. Ciriacy-Wantrup Postdoctoral Fellowships in Natural Resource Economics and Political Economy," which are awarded according to the following criteria:

For the purposes of this fellowship, natural resources are defined broadly to include environmental resources. The fellowship encourages, but is not limited to, policy-oriented research. Applications are open to scholars from any social science discipline, and related professional fields such as law and planning, who will make significant contributions to research on natural resource economics broadly defined. Preference will be given to proposals whose orientation is broadly institutional and/or historical, and which are conceptually and theoretically innovative.

Four postdoctoral fellowships are awarded each year, for one year with an option to renew (nearly automatic approval) for a second year. Visiting Research Fellowships are awarded for a single year only to academics with PhDs awarded no more than ten years in the past.

The Land Trust of Napa County manages the Wantrup Wildlife Sanctuary that was established in 1982. It is a 730-acre (3.0 km^{2}) oak woodland preserve in Pope Valley where oak reforestation studies and graduate research takes place.

== See also ==
- Contingent valuation
- Environmental economics
- Institutional economics
- Resource economics

== Publications ==
Ciriacy-Wantrup on google scholar

- Ciriacy-Wantrup, S-V (1938), Agrarkrisen und Stockungspannen, Berlin: Verlagsanstalt Paul Parey
- Ciriacy-Wantrup, S-V (1944), "Taxation and the Conservation of Resources", Quarterly Journal of Economics, 58 (2): 157–195, doi:10.2307/1883316, JSTOR 1883316
- Ciriacy-Wantrup, S-V (1961), "Conservation and Resource Programming", Land Economics, 37 (2): 105–111, doi:10.2307/3159555, JSTOR 3159555
- Ciriacy-Wantrup, S-V (1961), "Projections of Water Requirements in the Economics of Water Policy", Journal of Farm Economics, 43 (2): 197–214, doi:10.2307/1235779, JSTOR 1235779
- Ciriacy-Wantrup, S-V (1961), "Water Quality, a Problem for the Economist", Journal of Farm Economics, 43 (5): 1133–1144, doi:10.2307/1235561, JSTOR 1235561
- Ciriacy-Wantrup, S-V (1967), "Water Policy and Economic Optimizing: Some Conceptual Problems in Water Research", American Economic Review, 57 (2): 179–189
- Ciriacy-Wantrup, S-V (1969), "Natural Resources in Economic Growth: The Role of Institutions and Policies" (PDF), American Journal of Agricultural Economics, 51 (5): 1314–1324, doi:10.2307/1238009, JSTOR 1238009
- Ciriacy-Wantrup, S-V (1971), "The Economics of Environmental Policy", Land Economics, 47 (1): 36–45, doi:10.2307/3144965, JSTOR 3144965
- Richard C. Bishop and Stephen O. Andersen (Eds.) (1985), Natural Resource Economics : Selected Papers, S.V. Ciriacy-Wantrup, Westview Press
- Siegfried von Ciriacy-Wantrup (dir.) (1967). Natural Resources: Quality and Quantity, University of California Press (Berkeley) : viii + 217 p.
