= Fiscal environmentalism =

Economic approach linking fiscal policy with environmental goals

Fiscal Environmentalism is a hybrid term of two traditional and often conflicting philosophies, environmentalism and fiscal conservatism, created to emphasize the growing understanding of the middle ground between the two, where the goals of each are simultaneously fulfilled. The result is a business practice based upon principles of intelligent environmental design and financial discipline, associated with each.

== Concept ==
Traditional practices of environmental stewardship (including preservation, elimination of waste, and increased energy efficiency), complement bottom-line-driven economic policy (including increased profitability, reduced waste, and organizational efficiency). As future economic growth will demand both a higher degree of environmental awareness and a stronger utilization of available investment monies, the hallmarks of an efficiently organized and profitable company, organization, government, or household stand to benefit from environmentalism's holistic approach.

Fiscal environmentalism is a useful term for individuals who are familiar with either of the philosophies, and is related to very general concepts such as "sustainable business practices" and "socially responsible business practices", and other concepts more specific to traditional fields, such as Ecological Economics, and Environmental Management Systems. Compared to these other terms, fiscal environmentalism emphasizes fiscal discipline. It is used in discussions with business leaders who are looking to answer public demand for increased environmental awareness while still focusing on bottom-line success.

== Corporate examples ==
Recent examples of fiscal environmentalism include the rise of green building practices among government and traditional businesses as an attempt to save costs in energy consumption and improve indoor air quality. Even retailer Wal-Mart, which has often been strongly criticized by environmental groups for its environmental practices, has begun to embrace a fiscal environmentalist approach, if only to save money. It recently hired a new senior level Environmental Affairs officer. Wal-Mart has also recently made a monumental commitment to promoting energy-saving compact fluorescent light bulbs.

According to a global Newsweek ranking, which measures how effectively the top 100 companies manage environmental risks and opportunities relative to their industry peers, Royal Bank of Canada is the most environmentally friendly company in the world. Other companies in the top five include Lafarge, Grupo Ferrovial, Westpac and Yell Group.

== See also ==
- Business action on climate change
- Environmental accounting
- Environmental economics
- Environmental finance
- Green conservatism
- Green libertarianism
- Greenwashing
- Net income (bottom-line)
- Double bottom line
- Triple bottom line
