= Value of a statistical life =

Economic measure placing a monetary value on reducing the risk of death

The value of a statistical life (VSL) is an economic value used to quantify the benefit of avoiding a fatality. It is also referred to as the cost of life, value of preventing a fatality (VPF), and implied cost of averting a fatality (ICAF). In social and political sciences, it is the marginal cost of death prevention in a certain class of circumstances. In many studies the value also includes the quality of life, the expected life time remaining, as well as the earning potential of a given person especially for an after-the-fact payment in a wrongful death claim lawsuit.

As such, it is a statistical term, the value of reducing the average number of deaths by one. It is an important issue in a wide range of disciplines including economics, health care, adoption, political economy, insurance, worker safety, environmental impact assessment, globalization, and process safety.

The motivation for placing a monetary value on life is to enable policy and regulatory analysts to allocate the limited supply of resources, infrastructure, labor, and tax revenue. Estimates for the value of a life are used to compare the life-saving and risk-reduction benefits of new policies, regulations, and projects against a variety of other factors, often using a cost-benefit analysis.

Estimates for the statistical value of life are published and used in practice by various government agencies. In Western countries and other liberal democracies, estimates for the value of a statistical life typically range from US$1 million–US$10 million; for example, the United States FEMA estimated the value of a statistical life at US$7.5 million in 2020.

== Treatment in economics and methods of calculation ==
There is no standard concept for the value of a specific human life in economics. However, when looking at risk/reward trade-offs that people make with regard to their health, economists often consider the value of a statistical life (VSL). The VSL is very different from the value of an actual life. It is the value placed on changes in the likelihood of death, not the price someone would pay to avoid certain death. This is best explained by way of an example. From the EPA's website:

Suppose each person in a sample of 100,000 people were asked how much he or she would be willing to pay for a reduction in their individual risk of dying by 1 in 100,000, or 0.001%, over the next year. Since this reduction in risk would mean that we would expect one fewer death among the sample of 100,000 people over the next year on average, this is sometimes described as "one statistical life saved." Now suppose that the average response to this hypothetical question was $100. Then the total dollar amount that the group would be willing to pay to save one statistical life in a year would be $100 per person × 100,000 people, or $10 million. This is what is meant by the "value of a statistical life".

This again emphasizes that VSL is more of an estimate of willingness to pay for small reductions in mortality risks rather than how much a human life is worth. Using government spending to see how much is spent to save lives in order to estimate the average individual VSL is a popular method of calculation. The United States government does not have an official value of life threshold, but different values are used in different agencies. It might be that the government values lives quite highly or that calculation standard are not applied uniformly. Using the EPA as an example, the Agency uses estimates of how much people are willing to pay for small reductions in their risks of dying from adverse health conditions that may be caused by environmental pollution in their cost-benefit analyses.

Economists often estimate the VSL by looking at the risks that people are voluntarily willing to take and how much they must be paid for taking them. This method is known as revealed preference, where the actions of the individual reveal how much they value something. In this context, economists would look at how much individuals are willing to pay for something that reduces their chance of dying. Similarly, compensating differentials, which are the reduced or additional wage payments that are intended to compensate workers for conveniences or downsides of a job, can be used for VSL calculations. For example, a job that is more dangerous for a worker's health might require that the worker be compensated more. The compensating differentials method has several weaknesses. One issue is that the approach assumes that people have information, which is not always available. Another issue is that people may have higher or lower perceptions of risk they are facing that do not equate to actual statistical risk. In general, it is difficult for people to accurately understand and assess risk. It is also hard to control for other aspects of a job or different types of work when using this method. Overall, revealed preference may not represent population preferences as a whole because of the differences between individuals.

One method that can be used to calculate VSL is summing the total present discounted value of lifetime earnings. There are a couple of problems using this method. One potential source of variability is that different discount rates can be used in this calculation, resulting in dissimilar VSL estimates. Another potential issue when using wages to value life is that the calculation does not take into account the value of time that is not spent working, such as vacation or leisure. As a result, VSL estimates may be inaccurate because time spent on leisure could be valued at a higher rate than an individual's wage.

Another method used to estimate VSL is contingent valuation. Contingent valuation asks individuals to value an option either that they have not chosen or are unable to currently choose. Economists might estimate the VSL by simply asking people (e.g. through questionnaires) how much they would be willing to pay for a reduction in the likelihood of dying, perhaps by purchasing safety improvements. These types of studies are referred to as stated preference studies. However, contingent valuation has some flaws. The first problem is known as the isolation of issues, where participants may give different values when asked to value something alone versus when they are asked to value multiple things. The order of how these issues are presented to people matters as well. Another potential issue is the "embedding effect" identified by Diamond and Hausman 1994. All of these methods might result in a VSL that is overstated or understated.

When calculating value of statistical life, it is important to discount and adjust it for inflation and real income growth over the years. An example of a formula needed to adjust the VSL of a specific year is given by the following:

$${\mathit VSL}_{T} = {\mathit VSL}_{O} * \frac{P_{T}}{P_{O}} * \left( \frac{I_{T}}{I_{O}}\right )^\epsilon$$

where

VSL_{O} = Original Base Year, VSL_{T} = Updated Base Year, P_{T} = Price Index in Year t, I_{T} = Real Incomes in Year t, ε = Income Elasticity of VSL.

== Value of preventing a casualty ==
Value of Preventing a Casualty (VPC) is a more general concept to value of preventing a fatality. It means the value of preventing a fatality or a serious injury. According to Economic and Social Council's provisional agenda for review and analysis of the economic costs of level crossing accidents, "the value of preventing a casualty should be established by either Willingness-To-Pay or Human Capital/Lost Output approaches. It is essential to consider not only fatal injuries, but also serious (or even minor injuries) in this statistical life valuation exercise."

== Comparisons to other methods ==
The value of statistical life (VSL) estimates are often used in the transport sector and in process safety (where it may be coupled with the ALARP concept). In health economics and in the pharmaceutical sector, however, the value of a quality-adjusted life-year (QALY) is used more often than the VSL. Both of these measures are used in cost-benefit analyses as a method of assigning a monetary value of bettering or worsening one's life conditions. While QALY measures the quality of life ranging from 0–1, VSL monetizes the values using willingness-to-pay.

Researchers have first attempted to monetize QALY in the 1970s, with countless studies being done to standardize values between and within countries. However, as with the QALY, VSL estimates have also had a history of vastly differing ranges of estimates within countries, notwithstanding a standardization among countries. One of the biggest movements to do so was the EuroVaQ project which used a sample of 40,000 individuals to develop the WTP of several European countries.

== Policy applications ==
Value of life estimates are frequently used to estimate the benefits added due to a new policy or act passed by the government. One example is the 6-year retroactive study on the benefits and costs of the 1970 Clean Air Act in the period from 1970 to 1990. This study was commissioned by the U.S. Environmental Protection Agency (EPA), Office of Air and Radiation and Office of Policy, Planning and Evaluation, but was carried out by an independent board of public health experts, economists, and scientists headed by Dr. Richard Schmalensee of MIT.

On conducting the benefit-cost analysis, the team measured each dollar value of an environmental benefit by estimating a how many dollars a person is willing to pay in order to decrease or eliminate a current threat to their health, otherwise known as their "willingness-to-pay" (WTP). The WTP of the U.S. population was estimated and summed for separate categories including mortality, chronic bronchitis, hypertension, IQ changes, and strokes. Thus, the individual WTPs were added to get the value of a statistical life (VSL) for each category considered in the valuation of the act's benefits. Each valuation in figure 1 was the product of several studies which compiled both solicited WTP information from individuals and WTP estimates from risk compensation demanded in the current labor market and was averaged to find a singular VSL. Such data from the labor market was taken from the Census of Fatal Occupational Injuries collected by the Bureau of Labor Statistics.

For example, the valuation estimates used for mortality were divided by the typical life expectancy of each survey sample in order to get a dollar estimate per life-year lost or saved which was discounted with a 5 percent discount rate.

Using these estimates, the paper concluded that the benefits, ranging from $5.6 to $49.4 trillion in 1990 dollars, of implementing the Clean Air Act from 1970 to 1990 outweighed the economic costs of $523 billion in 1990 dollars.

== Estimates of the value of life ==
Equivalent parameters are used in many countries, with significant variation in the value assigned.

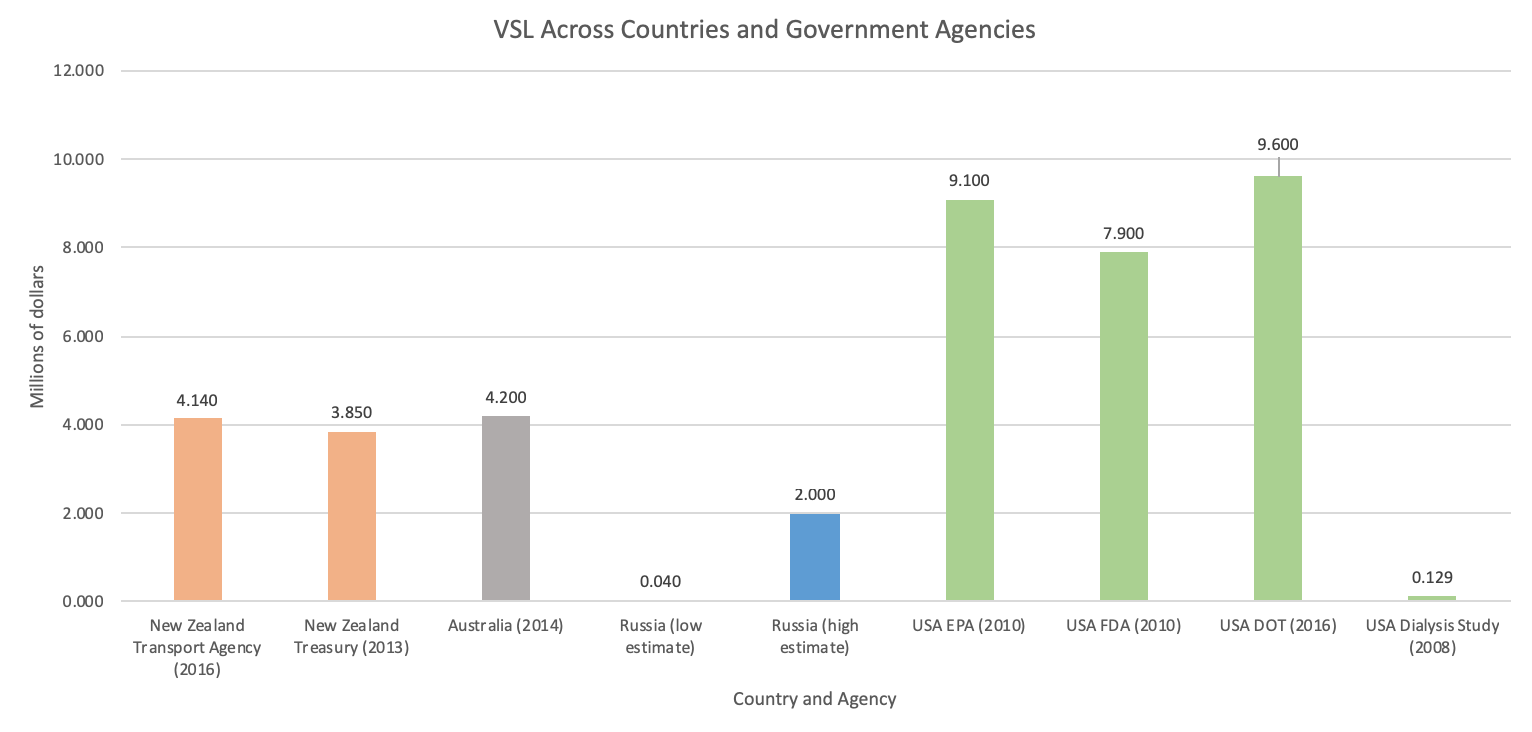
International VSL with data values

=== European Union ===
ERA fall back VPC in 2016 in €
Country	Fatality	Serious Injury	Slight injury
Austria	3,601,014	569,387	43,974
Belgium	3,582,968	550,056	42,488
Bulgaria	1,728,479	242,133	18,703
Croatia	2,541,972	355,636	27,459
Czech Republic	3,028,481	428,346	33,055
Denmark	3,988,844	622,286	48,084
Estonia	2,921,585	416,085	32,124
Finland	3,248,716	517,252	39,987
France	3,122,352	486,856	37,628
Germany	3,455,179	539,346	41,660
Greece	2,326,951	356,127	27,527
Hungary	2,761,351	383,034	29,559
Ireland	5,085,099	747,910	57,709
Italy	3,248,106	501,498	38,735
Latvia	2,338,370	337,234	26,049
Lithuania	2,697,114	389,643	30,071
Luxembourg	6,491,289	996,412	76,843
Netherlands	3,550,348	543,938	42,020
Norway	3,402,766	573,324	44,341
Poland	2,412,823	341,458	26,356
Portugal	2,541,032	385,934	29,815
Romania	2,443,038	339,588	26,203
Slovakia	2,846,309	404,481	31,222
Slovenia	2,425,302	364,655	28,182
Spain	3,019,875	458,207	35,392
Sweden	3,296,192	520,782	40,270
Switzerland	4,422,265	759,440	58,666
United Kingdom	2,873,899	481,459	37,222
EU average	3,273,910	498,591	38,514

==== Sweden ====
In Sweden, the value of a statistical life has been estimated from 9 to 98 million SEK (€0.9 - 10.6 million).

- 34.6 million SEK (€3.7 million) mean of studies in Sweden from 1995 and on
- 23 million SEK (€2.5 million) median of studies in Sweden from 1995 and on
- 22 million SEK (€2.4 million) recommended by official authorities

=== Australia ===
In Australia, the value of a statistical life has been set at:

- AU$5.87 million (2025)
- AU$253,000 per year (2025)

=== Canada ===
A report published in 2009 by the Policy Research Initiative updated a 1999 study by Chestnut et al., and found the average VSL to be $6.5 million in 2007 Canadian dollars. According to Canada's Cost-Benefit Analysis Guide for Regulatory Proposals, government departments and agencies are "expected to use this value as the VSL in their cost-benefit analysis."

This value is equivalent to $9.8 million in 2026 Canadian dollars, using the Bank of Canada inflation calculator. This is $3.7 million in 2000 US dollars.

=== India ===
Using a hedonic wage approach, the VSL in India among blue-collar male workers in manufacturing industries of Ahmedabad, Gujarat has been estimated to be 44.69 million INR ($0.64 million) in 2018.

=== New Zealand ===
In New Zealand, the value of a statistical life has been set at:

- NZ$2 million (1991) by NZTA
- NZ$3.85 million (2013) by The Treasury
- NZ$4.14 million (2016) by NZTA
- NZ$4.53 million (June 2019) by Ministry of Transport
- NZ$150,000 per year (2022) by Ministry of Health
- NZ$12.5 million (April 2023) by NZTA

=== Singapore ===
The value of statistical life (VSL) in Singapore was estimated in 2007 via a contingent valuation survey that elicits willingness-to-pay (WTP) for mortality risk reductions, which interviewed 801 Singaporeans and Singapore Permanent Residents aged 40 and above, entailing a value of statistical life of approximately S$850,000 to S$2.05 million (in 2007 S$, which is approximately 1.36 S$ in 2022). Mean WTP was also shown to have an inverse relationship with age, and is about 20% lower for persons aged 70 and older. Consistent with existing literature, the study also finds that mean WTP is not affected by physical health; but is affected by mental health. In addition, mean WTP is not affected by covariates such as gender, race, and personal income, but is affected by covariates such as household income, age, occupation and level of education.

For traffic accidents, the WTP-based VSL was estimated in 2008 at S$1.87 million (in 2008 S$, which is approximately 1.27 S$ in 2022). This was also compared against WTP-based VSL estimates in other countries, including 4.63 million for the US, 3.11 million for Sweden, 2.41 million for the UK, 2.38 million for New Zealand and 1.76 million for the EU (in 2008 S$).

The VSL obtained by other methods may differ significantly. For instance, if the VSL is estimated from the World Bank VSL adjusted to country-specific gross domestic product, which reflects a human capital approach, then the VSL in Singapore would be calculated to be US$8.96 million in 2014 (S$11.3 million in 2014, in 2014 S$, which is approximately 1.09 S$ in 2022).

=== Turkey ===
Studies by Hacettepe University estimated the VSL at about half a million purchasing power parity adjusted 2012 US dollars, the value of a healthier and longer life (VHLL) for Turkey at about 42,000 lira (about $27,600 in PPP-adjusted 2012 USD), and the value of a life year (VOLY) as about 10,300 TL (about $6,800 in PPP-adjusted 2012 USD), all as of 2012.

As of 2016 the estimated produced economic value for a life time for Turkey was US$59,000 which was 5.4 times GDP per capita.

=== Russia ===
According to different estimates life value in Russia varies from $40,000 up to $2 million. On the results of opinion poll life value (as the cost of financial compensation for the death) in the beginning of 2015 was about $71,500.

=== United Kingdom ===
As of 2013, the value of preventing a fatal casualty was £1.7m (2013 prices) in UK.

=== United States ===
The following estimates have been applied to the value of life. The estimates are either for one year of additional life or for the statistical value of a single life.

- $50,000 per year of quality life (the "dialysis standard", which had been a de facto international standard most private and government-run health insurance plans worldwide use to determine whether to cover a new medical procedure)
- $129,000 per year of quality life (an update to the "dialysis standard")
- $7.5 million (Federal Emergency Management Agency, Jul. 2020)
- $9.1 million (Environmental Protection Agency, 2010)
- $9.2 million (Department of Transportation, 2014)
- $9.6 million (Department of Transportation, Aug. 2016)
- $12.5 million (Department of Transportation, 2022)
- $13.2 million (Department of Transportation, 2023)

The income elasticity of the value of statistical life has been estimated at 0.5 to 0.6. Developing markets have smaller statistical value of life. The statistical value of life also decreases with age.

Historically, children were valued little monetarily, but changes in cultural norms have resulted in a substantial increase as evinced by trends in damage compensation from wrongful death lawsuits.

== Uses ==
Knowing the value of life is helpful when performing a cost-benefit analysis, especially in regard to public policy. In order to decide whether or not a policy is worth undertaking, it is important to accurately measure costs and benefits. Public programs that deal with things like safety (i.e. highways, disease control, housing) require accurate valuations in order to budget spending.

Since resources are finite, trade-offs are inevitable, even regarding potential life-or-death decisions. The assignment of a value to individual life is one possible approach to attempting to make rational decisions about these trade-offs.

When deciding on the appropriate level of health care spending, a typical method is to equate the marginal cost of the health care to the marginal benefits received. In order to obtain a marginal benefit amount, some estimation of the dollar value of life is required. One notable example was found by Stanford professor Stefanos Zenios, whose team calculated the cost-effectiveness of kidney dialysis. His team found that the VSL implied by then current dialysis practice averages about US$129,000 per quality-adjusted life year (QALY). This calculation has important implications for health care as Zenios explained:

"That means that if Medicare paid an additional $129,000 to treat a group of patients, on average, group members would get one more quality-adjusted life year."

In risk management activities such as in the areas of workplace safety, and insurance, it is often useful to put a precise economic value on a given life. The Occupational Safety and Health Administration under the Department of Labor sets penalties and regulations for companies to comply with safety standards to prevent workplace injuries and deaths. It can be argued that these high penalties are intended to act as a deterrent so that companies have an incentive to avoid them. As such, the price of the fines would have to be roughly equivalent to the value of a human life. Although some studies of the effectiveness of fines as a deterrent have found mixed results.

In transportation modes it is very important to consider the external cost that is paid by the society but is not calculated, for making it more sustainable. The external cost, although consisting of impacts on climate, crops and public health among others, is largely determined by impacts on mortality rate.

== Criticisms ==
The value of a statistical life has come under criticism from a range of sources both in economics and philosophy. These criticisms range from concerns with the specific methodology used, to value a statistical life to the very prospect of valuing life and using it in cost benefit analyses.

=== Concerns with aggregation ===
Some economists have argued that the value of a statistical life should be "disaggregated" to better capture the differences in mortality risk reduction preferences. Cass Sunstein and others have argued that the value of a statistical life should vary by type of risks, as people are more concerned about some risks than others, and by individuals, as some people are more risk seeking than others. This is proposed to ensure the accuracy of the measurement, as using an average may force some people to pay more than they are willing to for risk reduction, and prevent policies from being enacted for people who are willing to pay more than average for mortality risk reduction.

=== Concerns with valuing life ===
Some philosophers and policymakers have concerns about the underlying idea of valuing a statistical life at all. While some of these concerns represent a misunderstanding of what is meant by the value of a statistical life, many express concerns with the project of valuing lives. Elizabeth Anderson and other philosophers have argued that the methods for measuring the value of a statistical life are insufficiently accurate as they rely on wage studies that are conducted in non-competitive labor markets where workers have insufficient information about their working conditions to accurately determine the risk of death from taking a particular job. Further these philosophers contend that some goods (including mortality risk, as well as environmental goods) are simply incommensurate, it is impossible to compare them, and therefore impossible to monetize them and put them on a single scale, making the very practice of valuing a statistical life problematic.

Economists have responded to the more superficial concerns by advocating renaming or rebranding the value of a statistical life as a "micromort" or the amount someone would be willing to pay to reduce a one in one million risk of death, though philosophers contend that this does not resolve the underlying issues.

== See also ==
- ALARP
- Disability-adjusted life year
- Hedonic damages
- Intrinsic value (ethics)
- Incremental cost-effectiveness ratio
- Micromort
- Psychological significance and value in life
- Rational choice theory
- Utilitarianism
- Value (personal and cultural)
