= Environmental accounting =

Field of accounting incorporating environmental information

Environmental accounting is a field of accounting concerned with measuring, analysing and communicating financial and non-financial information about environmental impacts. At the corporate level, it assesses environmental performance and provides information to internal and external stakeholders. At national and regional levels, it records and analyses the environmental effects of economic systems. At the national level, environmental and economic information can be integrated through the System of Integrated Environmental and Economic Accounting, which extends the System of National Accounts.

Environmental accounting identifies resource use and measures and communicates environmental costs. These include the costs of cleaning up or remediating contaminated sites, environmental fines, penalties and taxes, pollution-prevention technologies, and waste management.

An environmental accounting system consists of environmentally differentiated conventional accounting and ecological accounting. Environmentally differentiated accounting measures the effects of the natural environment on a company in monetary terms. Ecological accounting measures a company's effects on the environment in physical terms.

== Motivation for environmental accounting ==
Environmental accounting can help businesses identify and assess environmental costs, including remediation costs, long-term environmental consequences and externalities.

Several theoretical perspectives explain why organisations undertake environmental accounting. Agency and political cost theories emphasise managerial and shareholder interests. Legitimacy, stakeholder and institutional theories examine responses to social expectations and pressures. Normative approaches, including accountability and critical theories, address organisations' responsibilities for their environmental impacts and obligations to stakeholders. These approaches consider how accounting ought to be practised, including its role in addressing inequality and injustice.

== Subfields ==
Environmental accounting is organised into global, national and corporate environmental accounting. Corporate environmental accounting can be further divided into environmental management accounting and environmental financial accounting.

- Global environmental accounting examines relationships between energetics, ecology and economics at a global level.
- National environmental accounting addresses environmental and economic information at the national level.

Internationally, environmental accounting has been formalised through the System of Integrated Environmental and Economic Accounting, known as SEEA, which builds on the System of National Accounts. SEEA records flows of raw materials, such as water, energy, minerals and wood, from the environment to the economy, exchanges of these materials within the economy, and the return of waste and pollutants to the environment. It also records prices or shadow prices for these materials and environmental protection expenditure. A 2007 United Nations assessment reported that environmental-economic accounting was implemented in 49 countries.

- Corporate environmental accounting focuses on a company's cost structure and environmental performance.
- Environmental management accounting supports internal business decisions through the identification, collection, analysis and use of physical information about energy, water and materials, including waste, and monetary information about environmentally related costs, earnings and savings.

As part of an environmental management accounting project in Victoria, Australia, four case studies were undertaken in 2002. These involved a school, Methodist Ladies College in Perth; a plastics manufacturer, Cormack Manufacturing Pty Ltd in Sydney; an office services provider, a service division of AMP; and a wool processor, GH Michell & Sons Pty Ltd in Adelaide. Participants in the project included KPMG, PricewaterhouseCoopers, Craig Deegan of RMIT University, and BDO Consultants Pty Ltd. In February 2003, John Thwaites, the Victorian Minister for the Environment, launched a report summarising the studies.

These studies were supported by the Department of Environment and Heritage of the Australian Federal Government, and appear to have applied some of the principles outlined in the United Nations Division for Sustainable Development publication, Environmental Management Accounting Procedures and Principles (2001).

- Environmental financial accounting provides information to external stakeholders about a company's financial performance. It supports the preparation of financial reports for investors, lenders and other interested parties.
- Certified emission reductions (CERs) accounting comprises the recognition, monetary and non-monetary evaluation, and monitoring of certified emission reductions and greenhouse gas emissions throughout the value chain. It also includes the evaluation and monitoring of the effects of emission credits on the carbon cycle of ecosystems.
- Environmental reporting is the disclosure of information about an organisation's environmental impacts and performance. It may cover environmental risks and liabilities, energy and waste costs, emissions, and pollution-control measures. Information can be communicated through annual reports, sustainability reports, integrated reports and websites, addressing stakeholders' information needs and expectations.

== Companies specialised in environmental accounting ==
- NEMS AS

== Examples of software ==
- EHS Data's Environmental and Sustainability Accounting and Management System
- Emisoft's Total Environmental Accounting and Management System (TEAMS)
- NEMS's NEMS Accounter

== Examples of software as a service ==
- Greenbase Online Environmental Accountancy

== See also ==
- Anthropogenic metabolism
- Carbon accounting
- Defensive expenditures
- Ecological economics
- Ecosystem services
- Emergy synthesis
- Environmental data
- Environmental economics
- Environmental enterprise
- Environmental finance
- Environmental management system
- Environmental monitoring
- Environmental pricing reform
- Environmental profit and loss account
- Fiscal environmentalism
- Full cost accounting (FCA)
- Greenhouse gas emissions accounting
- Industrial metabolism
- Material flow accounting
- Material flow analysis
- Monitoring Certification Scheme
- Social metabolism
- Sustainability accounting
- System of Integrated Environmental and Economic Accounting
- Urban metabolism
