= Environmental pricing reform =

Economics concept

Environmental pricing reform (EPR) or Ecological fiscal reform (EFR) is a fiscal policy of adjusting market prices to account for environmental costs and benefits; this is accomplished by the utilization of any forms of taxation or subsidy to incentivize or disincentivize practices with environmental impacts.

An externality (a type of market failure) exists where a market price omits environmental costs and/or benefits. In such a situation, rational (self-interested) economic decisions can lead to environmental harm, as well as to economic distortions and inefficiencies.

Environmental pricing reform can be economy-wide, or more focused (e.g. specific to a sector (such as electric power generation or mining) or a particular environmental issue (such as climate change). A "market-based instrument" or "economic instrument for environmental protection" is an individual instance of Environmental Pricing Reform. Examples include green tax-shifting (ecotaxation), tradeable pollution permits, or the subsidization of markets for ecological services.

== History ==
=== Early theory ===
The idea of governments taxing activities that create uncompensated cost on others was first planted by Arthur Pigou in The Economics of Welfare (1920). These taxes are now known as the Pigouvian taxes. Ronald Coase's 1960 article "The Problem of Social Cost" later proposed that defined property rights and low cost of transactions can solve these problems through bargaining and negotiations. this helped laid the foundation for tradable permit systems.

=== Policy adaptation ===
The current environmental tax policies began in northern Europe. Nordic countries first adopted environmental tax reform in early 1990s. These ideas later spread to Netherlands, Germany, and United Kingdom. Sweden later created three new environmental taxes in 1991-92. These taxed oil and natural gas emissions of carbon dioxide and sulfur dioxide and industrial nitrogen oxide emissions. The 1990 Clean Air Act Amendments implemented in the United States created the Acid Rain Program, a cap-and-trade system for emissions of sulfur dioxide that came from power plants. This later was used as reference for later emissions tax acts.

=== Tax reform in Europe ===
Several European countries, during the 1990s, adopted tax reforms, transferring part of the tax burden from beneficial things to resource exhaustion and pollution. Germany presented a new reform in 1999 that increased taxes on transport fuels, natural gas, heating fuels and residential electricity. This was done to be largely beneficial, with about 85% of tax revenue was purposed for cutting employers' and employees' payroll taxes. The reform drew large amounts of public dissatisfaction, and tax rates were later allowed to decrease. The United Kingdom introduced the Climate Change Levy in 2001 and later a carbon price lower limit. Scholarly debate in this period focused on the "double dividend" hypothesis, the claim that environmental taxes can both improve the environment and reduce the economic costs of the tax system if revenue is used to cut other distorting taxes.

=== Carbon markets and carbon pricing ===
In 2005 the European Union Emissions Trading System began operating and became the largest carbon market in the world. A few years after, British Columbia introduced a revenue-neutral carbon tax in Canada. Ever since, the number of carbon pricing instruments has increased on a worldwide scale.

=== Subsidy reform ===
In addition to carbon pricing, reform of fossil fuel subsidies has become a fundamental part of the topic. The International Monetary Fund (IMF) differentiate explicit subsidies, consumer prices are below supply cost, from implicit subsidies, prices don't cover environmental damage and other external costs. The IMF estimates that the total of the latter is very large.

== Theory ==
=== Externalities and the polluter-pays principle ===
In standard welfare economics, markets create too much pollution due to the fact that polluters do not pay for the harm they cause. Pricing externality, at the level of marginal damage, makes producers and consumers take the cost into account and lets them choose the least expensive way to cut emissions.

=== Price versus quantity ===
Economists differentiate between price-based instruments, such as taxes, which set the price of pollution and let the quantity fluctuate, and quantity-based instruments, such as cap-and-trade, which set the total quantity and let the price fluctuate. In theory the two obtain the same outcome if pollution meets expectations but will clash if it exceeds expectation due to environmental damage and the cost for companies implementing these.

=== Double dividend ===
Goulder (1994) reviews the double dividend hypothesis and identifies a "weak" form, using revenue to reduce distortionary taxes is better than returning it as lump sums, and "strong" form, the reform reduced overall economic cost or raises welfare apart from environmental benefits. He proposes that the weak form is more accessible or easily implementable, while the strong form usually needs specific conditions to be met.

=== Tax design ===
Parry, Norregaard, and Heine of the IMF set out the main design rules. A corrective tax proportional to marginal damages gives the efficient level of pollution reduction, but even a rate that differs greatly, around 50% higher or lower, still captures around three quarters of the welfare gain, so larger coverage is more important than exact measurements. They propose that taxes work best when applied to suppliers on fuels in relation to the amount of emissions, which also lowers administrative cost, and that taxes on consumers such as vehicle owners or electricity use miss don't have a significant impact on emission reduction.

=== Revenue recycling ===
The same article finds that the use of revenue impacts greatly the economic cost of reform. Shifting taxes from consumers on to those who produce the emission does not generally pay for itself, because higher energy prices lower wages and returns to investment, so the efficient tax is relatively below marginal damages. If revenue is not used to reduced distortionary taxes or spent correctly, overall benefits decrease quickly. The authors also caution against creating dedicated funds, which can lead governments to assign rates based on needs of the fund instead of by actual damages of a specific kind.

=== Distributional effects ===
Since low-income households often spend a large share of income on energy, environmental pricing can create the opposite effect than what they are trying to create. To avoid this reforms must revenue to compensate households that are affected by this.

== Real world applications ==
=== Carbon pricing worldwide ===
The World Bank reported that carbon pricing earnings rose from under $30 billion in 2016 to more than $107 billion in 2025. All large middle-income economies have already or plan to implement carbon pricing, with countries such as India and Vietnam having the most recent developments. The European Commission reports that most G20 countries are currently or planning implementation of domestic carbon pricing. Emissions in sectors covered by the EU Emissions Trading System have fallen y 50% since 2005. The Commission created a Task Force for International Carbon Pricing and Markets Diplomacy in 2024 and complements Canada's Global Carbon Pricing Challenge. Canada's challenge established a collective goal of covering 60% of worldwide emissions by 2030.

=== Country experiences ===
Since early 2010s, IMF economists reviewed multiple national systems. Sweden exempted manufacturing from usual energy taxes in 1993, and from 2004 manufacturers paid only 21 precent of CO_{2} tax rate. Germany's 1999 reform came with tax exemptions for manufacturing and power generation, originally 80% and later was reduced to 40%. Turkey had the highest gasoline tax in the OECD, about $0.98 per liter. This was caused mainly by the need to raise revenue instead of being a result of environmental goals. In 2004, Vietnam decided to implement comprehensive environmental tax reform, but taxed coal and gasoline at low rates.

=== United Staes Acid Rain Program ===
Established as Title IV of the Clean Air Act, the Acid Rain Program was the first national cap-and-trade program in the United States. The first phase began in 1995 and covered 263 units of energy at 110 coal-burning plants in 21 states. Phase 2 began in 2000 and grew to over 2,000 units. Instead of allowing power plants to be able to buy and sell permits to pollute, the program controlled nitrogen oxide production.

=== Fossil Fuel subsidy reform ===
The IMF estimated that explicit subsidies reached 1.3% of global GDP in 2022 because of temporary measures during the energy price increase, which fell to 0.6% in 2024. Subsidies decrease most since 2022 in Europe and Central Asia, the Middle East and North Africa, Latin America and the Caribbean, and Sub-Saharan Africa. The World Bank reported that governments spent $1 trillion on fossil fuel subsidies and tax expenses.

=== Analytical tools ===
The World Bank and IMF together developed the Climate Policy Assessment Tool (CPAT) to measure the effects of carbon pricing and subsidy reform. It has been implemented in more than 30 countries. The World Bank's MINDSET model, which makes an estimate on employment and distributional effects. This model has already been introduced in over 20 countries.

== See also ==
- Ecotax
- Environmental accounting
- Environmental economics
- Environmental enterprise
- Environmental finance
