= EIO =

Eio or EIO may refer to:

- Eio (river) in Norway
- Eio Books, an American publishing house
- Eio Sakata (1920–2010), Japanese professional Go player
- Environmental Investment Organisation
- European Investigation Order
- Extended interaction oscillator
- Enhanced Input/Output, an extension interface for printers, see JetDirect § EIO
- Input/output error, a POSIX error code represented as EIO
- Eiō, one of the eight major titles of professional shogi
