= Environmental enterprise =

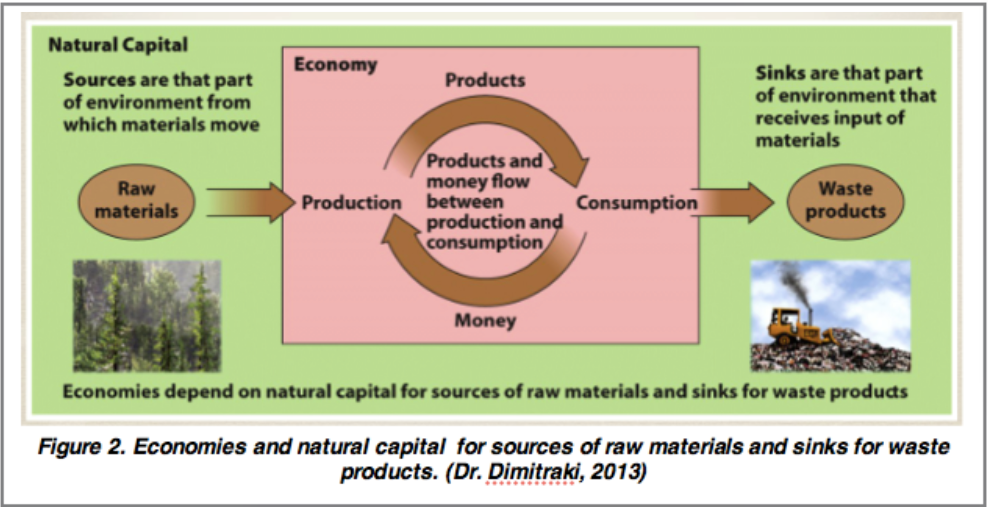
Economies and natural capital for sources of raw materials and sinks for waste products

An environmental enterprise is an environmentally friendly business, that aims to create value in the way an ecosystem does, neither producing waste nor consuming unsustainable resources. In addition, an environmental enterprise rather finds alternative ways to produce one's products instead of taking advantage of animals for the sake of human profits. To be closer to the goal of being an environmentally friendly company, some environmental enterprises invest their money to develop or improve their technologies which are also environmentally friendly. In addition, environmental enterprises usually try to reduce global warming, so some companies use materials that are environmentally friendly to build their stores. They also set in place regulations that are environmentally friendly. All these efforts of the environmental enterprises can bring positive effects both for nature and people. The concept is rooted in the well-enumerated theories of natural capital, the eco-economy and cradle to cradle design.,,

== Background ==
=== Economic globalization is an irreversible trend ===
Natural resource scarcity or/and abundance are drivers of globalization, as they incite supply and demand forces in global markets.

=== Environment and sustainability ===
For the past 50 years we have amassed unprecedented financial wealth, but have also chronically under-priced risk in terms of our natural resource base (our endowment of minerals, forests, fish, water and climate). We have financed our extraordinary growth in aggregate living standards while systematically under-pricing the goods and services we derive from our planet's natural resources, the negative externalities we create by polluting them and the future risks we face from their cumulative depletion and degradation. The phenomenal economic growth we have enjoyed over the past 50 years has seen our world's built environment and transport networks expand in size and complexity at an unprecedented rate. We have developed a vastly more interconnected global human ecosystem to provide us with food, fuel, water, homes and transportation than has ever been. Sustainability can be achieved because the companies adapt sustainable production to improve their image. Being environmentally friendly is good for product branding. Meanwhile, as social issues come up, some companies focus on the environmental issues in order to create the positive image of the company. As environmental social concerns increase, some companies start to supply environmentally friendly products and distribution systems. The meanings of the systems can be explained either by the viewpoints of the company's management or the idea that an environmentally friendly management guidelines will give a positive image of the company and its goods. In other words, these thoughts are based on economic and ethical reasons. The Kyoto Protocol can be an example: It was intended to solve global problems of climate change and global warming; however, some companies had already put reducing emissions and getting better energy efficiency into practice, which is helpful to create a positive public image.

== Nature ==
An environmental enterprise is an environmentally friendly/compatible business. Specifically, an environmental enterprise is a business that produces value in the same manner which an ecosystem does, neither producing waste nor consuming unsustainable resources. The concept is rooted in the well-enumerated theories of natural capital, the eco-economy and cradle to cradle design. The flow process shows the loop between enterprise and natural capital. Evidently, nature is the spring of wealth and the only thing that could and should be done is to promote the economy efficiency in the inner cycle.[6] In another word, strengthening the utilization ratio of raw materials to increase output, and meanwhile, enhancing the technology to reduce input of sources and waste products. To accomplish sustainability is, in this case, to make the economy functioning better. Examples of environmental enterprise would be Seventh Generation, Inc., and Whole Foods.

=== External cost ===
In economics, an externality is the cost or benefit that affects a party who did not choose to incur that cost or benefit. The cost of the environment is usually termed as the external cost of an enterprise. Air pollution from burning fossil fuels causes damages to crops, (historic) buildings and public health. "Social cost − private cost = External cost". The ideal situation of environmental enterprise is to cut the negative external cost.

=== Social cost ===
Social cost in economics may be distinguished from "private cost". Economic theorists model individual decision-making as measurement of costs and benefits. Social cost is also considered to be the private cost plus externalities.

For example, the manufacturing cost of a car (i.e., the costs of buying inputs, land tax rates for the car plant, overhead costs of running the plant and labor costs) reflects the private cost for the manufacturer (in some ways, normal profit can also be seen as a cost of production). The polluted waters or polluted air also created as part of the process of producing the car is an external cost borne by those who are affected by the pollution or who value unpolluted air or water. Because the manufacturer does not pay for this external cost (the cost of emitting undesirable waste into the commons), and does not include this cost in the price of the car (a Kaldor-Hicks compensation), they are said to be external to the market pricing mechanism. The air pollution from driving the car is also an externality produced by the car user in the process of using his good. The driver does not compensate for the environmental damage caused by using the car.

== How to achieve ==
- Take environmental issues into consideration in the process of operation and management of an enterprise.
  - Generally speaking, regardless of the scale of an enterprise, every industrial enterprise have the problem of being environmental friendly. Since the environmental issue is gradually affecting the long-term development of a nation, not only companies but also the state should take this into consideration and control the pollution in practice. An advanced enterprise should take care of the natural capital and external cost which paid by the nature circumstance rather than merely sacrifice the natural resources to make profit.
- Establishing an environmental managing system and regulations.
  - To achieve the concept of environmental enterprise is a multiple task. Not only polluting problem but also saving raw materials; decreasing the usage of energy, output of waste, reducing the carcinogens in products are highly emphasized. Only by accomplishing these could an industry completely deal with the environmental issue.
- Invested in reducing pollution from the origin of contamination and introducing environmental friendly production line.
  - The origin of contamination should be constrained. The most effective way of control degradation is to go to the beginning of it rather than the pathways.
- Carrying forward the culture of environmental enterprise and gradually modifying the whole industry.
  - It is our duty to maintain the globe. Therefore, making these a culture is one of the best way to keep people's consciousness in a long-term period of time.

== See also ==
- Environmental accounting
- Environmental economics
- Environmental finance
- Environmental pricing reform
