= NEMS AS =

Software development and advisory company

- Formerly: Novatech AS; Add Novatech AS
- Type: Private
- Industry: Software; Environmental management system Adviser
- Founded: 1986; 40 years ago
- Headquarters: Stavanger, Rogaland, Norway
- Products: EMS, Environmental accounting, GHG emission, Environmental Studies and Oil and gas industry
- Website: https://nems.eco

NEMS AS is a Software Development and advisory company, which is specialized in the domain of emissions control of emissions to air and discharge to sea, as well as environmental reporting and environmental management systems (EMS). The company provides its customers with software for environmental accounting, corporate sustainability reporting and chemical management. NEMS also provides advisory services to organizations, authorities and clients. NEMS AS has previously had other names including Novatech AS (Founding name) and Add Novatech AS in 2008 as part of Add Energy Group.

NEMS AS is headquartered in Stavanger, Rogaland, Norway.

== History ==
The company Novatech AS was founded in 1986 in Stavanger.

NEMS AS' first large scale project in the environmental domain came in 1991. NEMS AS was responsible for coordinating and creating content for the Environmental Programme on emissions to air and discharge to sea on behalf of OLF. As well as overseeing 14 external studies related to emissions to air and discharge to sea. The programme lasted 2 years and resulted in several written compendium volumes spanning over 2 phases. After the completion of the environmental programme Novatech AS started focusing on emissions work internationally focusing on environmental impact assessments. From 1995 NEMS started looking at software development opportunities related to Environmental Emissions in the Oil & Gas industry.

In 2008, Novatech AS were acquired by Add Energy Group and renamed Add Novatech AS.

In September 2018, Add Novatech AS was sold to Vela Operating group, which is a part of Canadian stock exchange listed company Constellation Software and rebranded NEMS AS. NEMS AS had been the historical name for all its software solutions, including NEMS Accounter, NEMS Chemicals, NEMS Forecaster and NEMS Panorama.

In 2021, NEMS AS signed a global frame agreement with Oil & Gas super-major BP.

== Environmental accounting software ==
NEMS AS released NEMS Accounter in 2005. NEMS Accounter and is an environmental accounting software used by the Oil & Gas operators to track their emissions during E&P processes. In Norway many operators use NEMS Accounter to generate data to be reported directly into the national environmental reporting solution, Epim Environmental Hub(EEH).

== Chemical management software ==
In 1995, NEMS AS in collaboration with three oil companies on the Norwegian Continental Shelf established a joint database for offshore chemical management. The database was first named Chems, this was later renamed NEMS Chemicals. NEMS Chemicals is a database solutions that enables chemical suppliers to provide operators with environmental documentation of chemicals according to the OSPAR HOCNF (Harmonized Offshore Chemical Notification Format) framework. The HOCNFs are then Color Coded as per the legislation of the local market according to the ecotoxicological properties of the product. The Norwegian Environment Agency also have access to the chemical documentation in NEMS Chemicals to make it easier for Operators and authorities with regards to apply for discharge permits.

The KPD Centre which audits and certifies the HOCNFs entered into the database is operated by NEMS AS under a steering committee consisting of the member oil companies, as well as participation of one member from EOSCA. NEMS Chemicals is the recommended in the Norwegian Oil and Gas Association guidelines for discharge and emission reporting.

== Corporate sustainability reporting ==
In 2018, NEMS AS released its Corporate Sustainability Reporting solution NEMS Panorama. NEMS Panorama enables companies to monitor global assets centrally and report according to various sustainability reporting schemes including GRI, CDP and IOGP.

== EPIM Environmental Hub (EEH) ==
In June 2015, NEMS AS were awarded the work to provide EPIM with a national environment reporting hub to be used by all the operators on the Norwegian Continental Shelf. Work started early July and the EPIM Environmental Hub solution was delivered end of September 2015. This enabled Norwegian operators to report successfully within 15 March deadline of 2016. EEH continues to be maintained and updated by NEMS AS.

== Environmental advisory services and studies ==
NEMS AS provide environmental advisor services related to annual reporting of Revised National Budget(RNB) numbers for Norwegian Oil and Gas Operators, consultancy and energy management. NEMS AS environmental advisors also work with various governmental authorities and interest organizations related to performing studies in the environmental domain specific to the Oil & Gas industry.

Advisory competency includes Chemicals management, Energy management, Environmental compliance, Environmental studies and Power from shore.

NEMS AS have done and participated in multiple large studies including:

- One of the largest and significant studies of its kind related to mapping of cold venting and fugitive emissions from Norwegian offshore oil and gas activities on behalf of the Norwegian Environment Agency
- A study related to mapping of cold venting and fugitive emissions of methane and NMVOCs from petroleum operations onshore on behalf of the Norwegian Environment Agency
- Study related to Power From shore of Utsira and Johan Sverdrup on behalf of Norwegian Petroleum Directorate and Energi Norge. Identifying a half the cost compared to the numbers provided by Norwegian national operator Statoil.
- Klimakur 2020 – NEMS contributed to large scale project started in 2010 to see how Norway could reduce its emissions by 2020 on behalf of the Norwegian Environment Agency, the Norwegian Petroleum Directorate, the Norwegian Petroleum Safety Authority and the Norwegian Water Resources and Energy Directorate

== Customers ==
The company's customers include:

- Oil & Gas companies
- Chemical suppliers
- National Authoritites
- Special Interest Organizations and Non-Profits

== See also ==
- Environmental accounting
- Environmental impact assessment
- Environmental management system
