= Embedding effect =

The embedding effect is an issue in environmental economics and other branches of economics where researchers wish to identify the value of a specific public good using a contingent valuation or willingness-to-pay (WTP) approach. The problem arises because public goods belong to society as a whole, and are generally not traded in the market. Because market prices cannot be used to value them, researchers ask a sample of people how much they are willing to pay for the public good, wildlife preservation for example. The results can be misleading because of the difficulty, for individual society members, of identifying the particular value that they attach to one particular thing which is embedded in a collection of similar things (e.g. The Tower of London within the set of all globally important historic monuments or Caernarvon Castle within the set of all Welsh Scheduled Monuments). A similar problem occurs with a wider selection of public goods (for example whether spending on preserving a specific wetland is more important than preserving a specific persons life for the next two years using taxpayers' money). The embedding effect suggests the contingent valuation method is not an unbiased approach to measuring policy impacts for cost-benefit analysis of environmental, and other government policies.

== Policy implications ==
Few government policies are independent of any other governmental policy. Most policies involve either substitute or complementary relationships with others at either the same or different intergovernmental level. For example, in the United States, the protection of coastal water quality is a goal of both state and multiple federal agencies. The Clean Water Act, wetlands protection programs, and fisheries management plans all address coastal water quality. These policies may be substitutes or complements for each other. These relationships complicate the application of the contingent valuation method. The resulting problems that may be encountered have been called the part-whole bias and sequencing and nesting (see below).

One method of overcoming some aspects of this problem is to ask two questions (1) How much would you be willing to contribute to a specific tax fund for the whole set of items to be preserved? (e.g. all Coral Sea areas west of Australia) followed by (2) How much of this would you like to give to the preservation of the specific named item? (e.g. the Great Barrier Reef). These questions may also be supplemented by questions which ask about the respective importance of alternatives e.g. whether the preservation of the Great Barrier Reef is more/the same/less important than other public goods such as poor relief, health care, education etc.

== Part-whole bias ==
If the contingent valuation method is used to elicit willingness to pay for two government policies independently (the parts) the sum of the independently estimated willingness to pay amounts may be different from the willingness to pay elicited for both projects (the whole). This result is troubling if the projects are geographically related, for example, different wilderness areas (McFadden, 1994). This result does not violate the nonsatiation axiom of consumer theory if projects are perfect substitutes (Carson and Mitchell, 1995). Several applications of the contingent valuation method have found an absence of part-whole bias (e.g., Whitehead, Haab, and Huang, 1998).

== Sequencing and Nesting ==
A related issue occurs with the sequential valuation of projects. Consider a two-part policy valued in two different sequences. The willingness to pay for a project when valued first will be larger than when the question is placed second. Independent valuation, in effect valuing each project at the beginning of a sequence, will always lead to the largest of the possible willingness to pay estimates. This result is expected for the value of public goods estimated with the contingent valuation method due to substitution and income effects (Hoehn and Randall, 1989; Carson, Flores, and Hanemann, 1998).
