= Defensive expenditures =

In environmental accounting, defensive expenditures are expenditures that seek to minimise potential damage to oneself. Examples include defence and insurance.
