= Environmental compliance =

Conforming to environmental laws, regulations, standards and other requirements

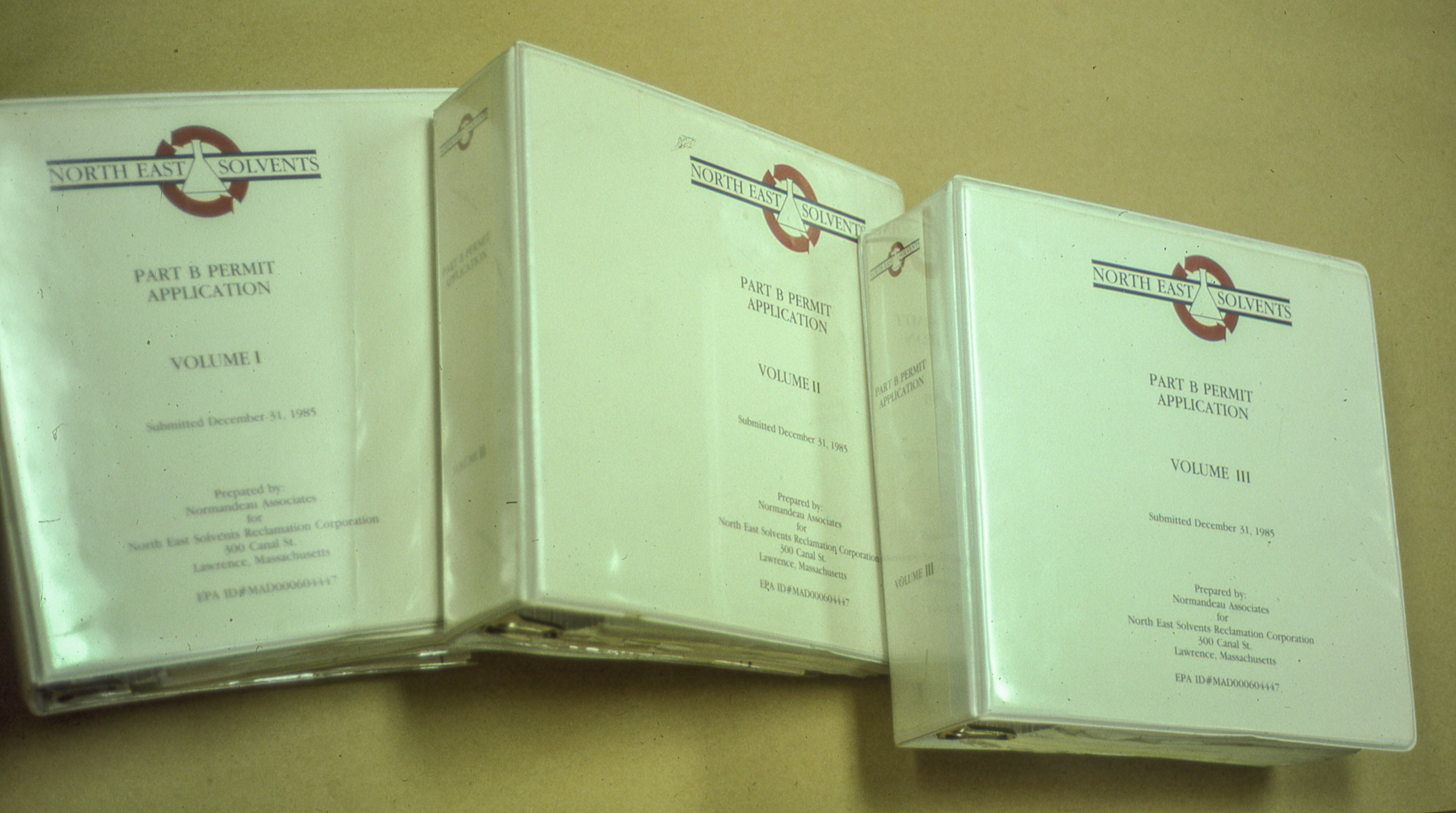
Environmental compliance often requires a breadth of documentation; shown here is an example of a "part B" permit application for a solvents plant, in compliance with the US Resource Conservation and Recovery Act (RCRA)

Environmental compliance means conforming to environmental laws, regulations, standards and other requirements such as site permits to operate. In recent years, environmental concerns have led to a significant increase in the number and scope of compliance imperatives across all global regulatory environments. Being closely related, environmental concerns and compliance activities are increasingly being aligned with corporate performance goals and being integrated to some extent to avoid conflicts, wasteful overlaps, and gaps.

Compliance with the above requirements and obligations, requires meeting certain conditions. Typically, these include:

- Managing monitoring programmes or schedules, ensuring that the monitoring required in the permit has been done, at the correct locations, for the correct parameters, and at the correct frequency
- Pre-processing, performing calculations and validating the data for compliance with any alert or reporting levels
- Generating routine compliance reports for authorities.

The management of the above can be complex and time-consuming, leading to an increasing uptake of software systems designed to manage environmental compliance. These are often referred to as 'Environmental Data Management Systems' (EDMS). Criteria must be considered when selecting environmental compliance software: proven capability, high performance, transparent, traceable data handling, a robust calculation engine, advanced factor handling, simple integration, automated workflows and QA, and flexible reporting and data extraction.

== Regulations concerning toxic substances ==
- POP Environmental Compliance: Persistent Organic Pollutants (POPs) are halogenated organic substances that are regulated due to the Stockholm Convention.
- REACH Environmental Compliance: Registration, Evaluation, Authorization, and Restriction of Chemicals (REACH) applies to most products within the EU market. A declaration to the European Chemicals Agency is required if a product contains more than 0.1% of Substances of Very High Concern (SVHC).
- California Proposition 65 Environmental Compliance: Managed by the California Office of Environmental Health Hazard Assessment (OEHHA), the California Proposition 65 regulation applies to all consumer goods sold in California and businesses with 10 or more employees.
- TSCA Environmental Compliance : Managed by the Environmental Protection Agency (EPA), the Toxic Substances Control Act (TSCA) applies to all substances and products manufactured in and imported to the United States.
- RoHS Environmental compliance : Restriction of Hazardous Substances (RoHS) is another regulation applicable to Electrical and Electronic Equipment (EEE).

== See also ==
- MCERTS
- Environmental accounting
- Environment, health and safety
- Emission standard
- Environmental certification
- Environmental data
- Environmental monitoring
