= Contingent valuation =

Survey-based economic technique for finding the value of resources without market prices

Contingent valuation is a survey-based economic technique for the valuation of non-market resources, such as environmental preservation or the impact of externalities like pollution. While these resources do give people utility, certain aspects of them do not have a market price as they are not directly sold – for example, people receive benefit from a beautiful view of a mountain, but it would be tough to value using price-based models. Contingent valuation surveys are one technique which is used to measure these aspects. Contingent valuation is often referred to as a stated preference model, in contrast to a price-based revealed preference model. Both models are utility-based. Typically the survey asks how much money people would be willing to pay (or willing to accept) to maintain the existence of (or be compensated for the loss of) an environmental feature, such as biodiversity.

== History ==
Contingent valuation surveys were first proposed in theory by S.V. Ciriacy-Wantrup (1947) as a method for eliciting market valuation of a non-market good. The first practical application of the technique was in 1963 when Robert K. Davis used surveys to estimate the value hunters and tourists placed on a particular wilderness area. He compared the survey results to an estimation of value based on travel costs and found good correlation with his results. This work was published as his Ph.D. Dissertation at Harvard "The Value of Outdoor Recreation: An Economic Study of the Maine Woods." See also: This work, and other early applications of the method are described in Chapter 1 of "Using Surveys to Value Public Goods" by Robert Cameron Mitchell, and Richard T. Carson.

The method rose to prominence in the United States in the 1980s when federal and State governments were given the authority to sue for damage to environmental resources that they held in trust for the public. Following Ohio v Department of the Interior, the types of damages which they were able to recover included non-use or existence values. Existence values are unable to be assessed through market pricing mechanisms, so contingent valuation surveys were suggested to assess them. During this time, the EPA convened an important conference with an aim to recommend guidelines for survey design. The Exxon Valdez oil spill in Prince William Sound was the first case where contingent valuation surveys were used in a quantitative assessment of damages. Use of the technique has spread from there.

== Past controversies ==
Many economists question the use of stated preference to determine willingness to pay for a good, preferring to rely on people's revealed preferences in binding market transactions. Early contingent valuation surveys were often open-ended questions of the form "how much compensation would you demand for the destruction of X area" or "how much would you pay to preserve X". Such surveys potentially suffer from a number of shortcomings; strategic behaviour, protest answers, response bias and respondents ignoring income constraints. Early surveys used in environmental valuation seemed to indicate people were expressing a general preference for environmental spending in their answers, described as the embedding effect by detractors of the method.

In response to criticisms of contingent valuation surveys, a panel of high-profile economists (chaired by Nobel Prize laureates Kenneth Arrow and Robert Solow) was convened under the auspices of the United States National Oceanic and Atmospheric Administration (NOAA). The panel heard evidence from 22 expert economists and published its results in 1993. The recommendations of the NOAA panel were that contingent valuation surveys should be carefully designed and controlled due to the inherent difficulties in eliciting accurate economic values through survey methods.

The most important recommendations of the NOAA panel were that:

- Personal interviews be used to conduct the survey, as opposed to telephone or mall-stop methods.
- Surveys be designed in a yes or no referendum format put to the respondent as a vote on a specific tax to protect a specified resource.
- Respondents be given detailed information on the resource in question and on the protection measure they were voting on. This information should include threats to the resource (best and worst-case scenarios), scientific evaluation of its ecological importance and possible outcomes of protection measures.
- Income effects be carefully explained to ensure respondents understood that they were to express their willingness to pay to protect the particular resource in question, not the environment generally.
- Subsidiary questions be asked to ensure respondents understood the question posed.
- "[CVM] produces estimates reliable enough to be the starting point of a judicial process of damage assessment, including passive-use values" and has been successfully used in such high-profile cases as the Exxon Valdez oil spill.

The guiding principle behind these recommendations was that the survey operator has a high burden of proof to satisfy before the results can be seen as meaningful. Surveys meeting these criteria are very expensive to operate and to ameliorate the expense of conducting surveys the panel recommended a set of reference surveys which future surveys could be compared to and calibrated against. The NOAA panel also felt, in general, that conservative estimates of value were to be preferred and one important consequence of this decision is that they recommended contingent valuation surveys measure willingness to pay to protect the good rather than willingness to accept compensation for the loss of the resource.

The economist Peter Abelson, who appraised six development projects for the Overseas Development Institute, reported in Project Appraisal and Valuation of the Environment (1996) that contingent valuation surveys needed more preparation than a consultancy assignment allowed. They also yielded little where property rights or the distribution of income were in dispute.

As a result, current contingent valuation methodology corrects for these shortcomings, and current empirical testing indicates that such bias and inconsistency has been successfully addressed.

== Current status ==
As shown by Mundy and McLean (1998), contingent valuation is now widely accepted as a real estate appraisal technique, particularly in contaminated property or other situations where revealed preference models (i.e. transaction pricing) fail due to disequilibrium in the market. McLean, Mundy, and Kilpatrick (1999) demonstrate the acceptability of contingent valuation in real estate expert testimony, and the current standards for use of contingent valuation in litigation situations is described by Diamond (2000).

The technique has been widely used by government departments in the US when performing cost-benefit analysis of projects impacting, positively or negatively, on the environment. Examples include a valuation of water quality and recreational opportunities in the river downstream from Glen Canyon dam, biodiversity restoration in the Mono Lake and restoration of salmon spawning grounds in certain rivers. The technique has also been used in Australia to value areas of the Kakadu National Park as well as trophy property in the United States, and is recognized as a valuable tool in the appraisal of brownfields.

== See also ==
- Choice modelling
- Opportunity cost
- Scarcity
- Trade-off
