= Green trading =

Environmental economics term

Green trading encompasses all forms of environmental financial trading, including carbon dioxide, sulfur dioxide (acid rain), nitrogen oxide (ozone), renewable energy credits, and energy efficiency (negawatts). All these emerging and established environmental financial markets have one thing in common, which is making profits in the emerging emissions offset economy by investing in "clean technology".

Green Trading claims to accelerate change to a cleaner environment by using market-based incentives whose application is global. Some examples, such as the carbon market or market for SO2 suggests that market-based systems are more likely environmentally effective because market systems will direct abatement to relatively larger and more heavily utilized sources with relatively high emission intensities.

Many current projects to advance green technology are recipients of funding generated through the voluntary carbon offset market in the United States. Though currently not required to do so, many companies are seeking ways to clean up their environmental impact. Bad energy practices that they cannot eliminate, they may offset; knowing that they are funding projects that are actively developing cleaner energy practices and increasing energy efficiency for the future.

In November 2008, in a unique partnership initiated by Verus Carbon Neutral, 17 businesses of Atlanta's Virginia Highland came together to establish themselves as the first carbon-neutral zone in the United States. Their efforts now fund the Valley Wood Carbon Sequestration Project, the first such project to be verified through the Chicago Climate Exchange.

== See also ==
- Carbon emission trading
- Eco-capitalism
- Eco-investing
- Low-carbon economy
- Natural resource economics
