= Trophy property =

A trophy property or trophy home is a real estate term for the top 2% of properties in a given subcategory, the term refers to residences, architecturally or historically preserved properties, agricultural lands that have extraordinary yields, high-amenity natural land and properties with spectacular views, or other extraordinary amenities. The term also can refer to capstone properties such as office buildings or other unique income-producing properties.

== Controversies in the United States ==
Valuing trophy property for federally financed land acquisitions is unique among appraisal assignments, in that supplemental standards proffered by many (but not all) federal agencies require that comparable transactions used for valuation be limited to those with an "economic use" and not those acquired solely for "preservation" purposes. Currently, only acquisitions by certain Federal agencies must adhere to this supplemental appraisal standard.
