= Market-based environmental policy instruments =

Economic policy instruments

In environmental law and policy, market-based instruments (MBIs) are policy instruments that use markets, price, and other economic variables to provide incentives for polluters to reduce or eliminate negative environmental externalities. MBIs seek to address the market failure of externalities (such as pollution) by incorporating the external cost of production or consumption activities through taxes or charges on processes or products, or by creating property rights and facilitating the establishment of a proxy market for the use of environmental services. Market-based instruments are also referred to as economic instruments, price-based instruments, new environmental policy instruments (NEPIs) or new instruments of environmental policy.

Examples include environmentally related taxes, charges and subsidies, emissions trading and other tradeable permit systems, deposit-refund systems, environmental labeling laws, licenses, and economic property rights. For instance, the European Union Emission Trading Scheme is an example of a market-based instrument to reduce greenhouse gas emissions.

Market-based instruments differ from other policy instruments such as voluntary agreements (actors voluntarily agree to take action) and regulatory instruments (sometimes called "command-and-control"; public authorities mandate the performance to be achieved or the technologies to be used). However, implementing an MBI also commonly requires some form of regulation. Market-based instruments can be implemented systematically, across an economy or region, across economic sectors, or by environmental medium (e.g. water). Individual MBIs are instances of environmental pricing reform.

According to Kete (2002), "policymaking appears to be in a transition towards more market-oriented instruments, but it remains an open-ended experiment whether we shall successfully execute a long-term social transition that involves the private sector and the state in new relationships implied by the pollution prevention and economic instruments rhetoric."

== History ==
For example, although the use of new environmental policy instruments only grew significantly in Britain in the 1990s, David Lloyd George may have introduced the first market-based instrument of environmental policy in the UK when a Fuel tax was levied in 1909-1910 during his ministry.

== Transferable permits ==
A market-based transferable permit sets a maximum level of pollution (a 'cap'), but is likely to achieve that level at a lower cost than other means, and, importantly, may reduce below that level due to technological innovation.

When using a transferable-permit system, it is very important to accurately measure the initial problem and also how it changes over time. This is because it can be expensive to make adjustments (either in terms of compensation or through undermining the property rights of the permits). Permits' effectiveness can also be affected by things like market liquidity, the quality of the property right, and existing market power. Another important aspect of transferable permits is whether they are auctioned or allocated via grandfathering.

An argument against permits is that formalising emission rights is effectively giving people a license to pollute, which is believed to be socially unacceptable. However, although valuing adverse environmental impacts may be controversial, the acceptable cost of preventing these impacts is implicit in all regulatory decisions.

== Taxes ==
A market-based tax approach determines a maximum cost for control measures. This gives polluters an incentive to reduce pollution at a lower cost than the tax rate. There is no cap; the quantity of pollution reduced depends on the chosen tax rate.

A tax approach is more flexible than permits, as the tax rate can be adjusted until it creates the most effective incentive. Taxes also have lower compliance costs than permits. However, taxes are less effective at achieving reductions in target quantities than permits. Using a tax potentially enables a double dividend, by using the revenue generated by the tax to reduce other distortionary taxes through revenue recycling. There can also be a conflict between objectives with a tax: less pollution means less revenue.

== Market-based vs command and control ==
An alternate approach to environmental regulation is a command and control approach. This is much more prescriptive than market-based instruments. Command and control regulatory instruments include emissions standards, process/equipment specifications, limits on input/output/discharges, requirements to disclose information, and audits. Command and control approaches have been criticised for restricting technology, as there would be no incentive for firms to innovate. Empirical studies have shown the opposite; external price changes can induce innovation as companies are forced to address the market failure of under-investment.

Market-based instruments do not prescribe that firms use specific technologies, or that all firms reduce their emissions by the same amount, which allows firms greater flexibility in their approaches to pollution management. However, command and control approaches may be beneficial as a starting point, when regulators are faced with a significant problem yet have too little information to support a market-based instrument. Command and control approaches can also be preferred when regulators are faced with a thin market, where the limited potential trading pools mean the gains of a market-based instrument would not exceed the costs (a key requirement for a successful market-based approach).

Market-based instruments may also be inappropriate in dealing with emissions with local impacts, as trading would be restricted to within that region. They may also be inappropriate for emissions with global impacts, as international cooperation may be difficult to attain.

For a variety of reasons, environmental advocates initially opposed the use of market-based instruments except under very constrained conditions. However, after the successful use of freely traded credits in the lead phasedown in the U.S. environmental advocates recognized that trading markets have benefits for the environment as well. Thereafter, beginning with the proposal of the acid rain allowance market, environmental advocates have supported the use of trading in a variety of contexts.

== See also ==
- Carbon tax
- Standard-setting organisations
