= Travel cost analysis =

The travel cost method of economic valuation, travel cost analysis, or Clawson method is a revealed preference method of economic valuation used in cost–benefit analysis to calculate the value of something that cannot be obtained through market prices (i.e. national parks, beaches, ecosystems). The aim of the method is to calculate willingness to pay for a constant price facility. The technique was first suggested by the statistician Harold Hotelling in a 1947 letter to the director of the National Park Service of the United States for a method to measure the benefit of National Parks to the public. The method was further refined by Trice and Wood (1958) and Clawson (1959). The technique is one approach to the estimation of a shadow price.

== Methodology ==
The general principle is that individual visitors spend varying amounts of time and money to access a particular resource. The further away an individual from the resource, the more time and money they spend and the less frequent is the visit. Individual closer to the resource tend to visit more often and spend less. By fitting the distribution of individuals within this spectrum an average of the transport and opportunity costs of the time spent travelling to a recreational site is used to determine the value of the site. Various approaches may be used in the actual collection of data and the estimation. The travel cost method of economic valuation is a revealed preference method because it looks at actual human behavior to try to define the value people place on something.

- A sample of visitors to the facility are selected
- These visitors are split into "zones" depending on their distance travelled to the facility.
- The average distance to the facility and the average travel cost to the facility from each zone are calculated.
- The visit rate from each zone is calculated.

(i.e.) Visit rate: The number of visitors from a given zone/The population of that zone

- The visit rate is regressed against travel cost in order to create a visit rate curve.

Visit rate from given zone = f(cost from given zone)

VR=a+b.C

- This curve can then be used to obtain estimates of visit rates given differing levels of total costs.
- This enables estimates of numbers of visitors from each zone to be made given differing level of facility price.
- The sum of the number of visitors from each zone can be plotted/regressed against these differing levels of facility price in order to create a demand curve for the facility.
- The area under this demand curve is the willingness to pay for the facility which can be used as a valuation for CBA purposes.
