= Environmental Investment Organisation =

British non-governmental climate change organisation

The Environmental Investment Organisation (EIO) is a UK-based not-for-profit body dedicated to researching, proposing and implementing solutions to climate change. It has developed the Environmental Tracking (ET) concept, rebranded by ET Index Research in 2016 to Engaged Tracking, into two separate components known as the ET Carbon Rankings and the ET Index Series. The ET Carbon Rankings rate companies based on their greenhouse gas emissions intensity and transparency. The ET Low Carbon & Fossil Free Index Series, which are based on the rankings, provide investors with a tool to incentivise companies to lower emissions while reducing their exposure to potential future carbon 'price shocks'.

== Origins ==
The EIO was set up as in 1996 by London School of Economics alumnus, Michael Gill, as a parallel body to the LSE Environmental Initiatives Network (EIN). Michael Gill co-founded the LSE EIN with Janos Abel and was the EIN's first elected chairman stepping down in 2003 to become the vice-chairman.,

== Publications ==
The EIO has commissioned several publications: Environmental Tracking - Can Investment Revolution Prevent Ecological Catastrophe (1997);, A Solution to Global Warming... (2009). and more recently Environmental Tracking 3.0 (2011). The original book proposed the concept of Environmental Tracking, which envisaged using the power of the stock market, primarily through index funds, as a means to incentivise companies to reduce their emissions. In the book Gill proposed the creation of an Environmental Scoring Panel (ESP), which would evaluate companies based on a range of environmental criteria. This environmental scoring would then be used to weight companies within an index. With the emergence of climate change as the overriding concern of the 21st century, however, the concept was refined to focus specifically on corporate greenhouse gas emissions. This was also facilitated by improved rates of corporate emissions disclosure as witnessed by response rates to the Carbon Disclosure Project's annual questionnaires to the world's largest companies, which asks them to provide data on their emissions.

The EIO produced reports to accompany the publication of the ET Carbon Rankings highlighting the inconsistent nature of emissions reporting.

== EIO creates first public ET Carbon Rankings ==
The EIO launched its pilot rankings in 2010. These included the ET Europe 300, North America 300, Asia-Pacific 300, BRIC 100, ET Global 1000, and ET Global 800. The pilot rankings were based on absolute emissions across Scope 1, 2 and 3 emissions. The EIO methodology at the time only accepted Scope 3 emissions which were verified to a 'reasonable level of assurance' by an independent third party. Since then, the methodology has been changed to rank companies according to emissions intensity. From 2011 the methodology was changed to include Scope 3 emissions following the publication of the GHG Protocol Corporate Value Chain (Scope 3) Accounting and Reporting Standard.

== ET Index Research ==
In February 2014 the company ET Index Research was established by EIO staff Sam Gill, Sebastian Hoeg, and Jonathan Harris, to commercialise the ET Index Series with the support of the Climate KIC, the European Union's main climate change innovation initiative.

From 2015 ET Index Research began hosting the ET Carbon Rankings and ET Index Series and took on the role of commercialising the ET Index Series.

== See also ==
- Carbon Disclosure Project
- Index fund
