= Environmental data =

Environmental data is that which is based on the measurement of environmental pressures, the state of the environment and the impacts on ecosystems. This is usually the "P", "S" and "I" of the DPSIR model where D = Drivers, P = Pressures, S = State, I = Impact, R = Response.

Environmental data is typically generated by institutions executing environmental law or doing environmental research. Environment statistics are usually generated by statistical offices and are considered as environmental data, too. Socio-economic data and other statistical data (often the "D" and the "R" of the DPSIR model) are not considered as environmental data. However, they are to be integrated into comprehensive environmental assessments. Usually this kind of data is held by other institutions than the environmental administration (e.g. National Statistical Offices). The same is true for geo-basisdata, which are not considered as environmental data, but have to be available for environmental policies and environmental information. In recent years, environmental data has become increasingly important to investors, prompting Bloomberg L.P. to begin providing Environmental, Social and Governance (ESG) data through their terminals.

All data generated by the execution of environmental law are to be considered as environmental data.

== Environmental Data Management Systems (EDMS) ==
In order to comply with the above requirements and obligations, certain conditions within them must be met. Typically these will include:

- Managing monitoring programmes or schedules, ensuring that the monitoring required in the permit has been done, at the correct locations, for the correct parameters, and at the correct frequency
- Pre-processing, performing calculations and validating the data for compliance with any alert or reporting levels
- Generating routine compliance reports for authorities.

The management of the above can be complex and time-consuming, leading to an increasing uptake of software systems designed to manage environmental compliance. These are often referred to as 'Environmental Data Management Systems' (EDMS), the selection of which is subject to a number of key criteria. This often includes the EDMS product features, it's flexibility, ease of use, scalability, security, input and output options, hosting, and cost.

There are many drivers for ESG integration. According to one forecast, ESG assets under management (AUM) will reach $53 trillion in the next four years – a sum that's equivalent to one-third of all AUM globally. Some of these drivers include: fee pressure, increased regulatory pressure, and demands from asset owners for more funds linked to sustainable business practices as well as social justice.

== See also ==
- Earth observation
- Semantic Sensor Web
- Environmental compliance
- Environment, health and safety
