= Environmental finance =

Field of finance focused on environmental policy

Environmental finance is a field within finance that employs market-based environmental policy instruments to improve the ecological impact of investment strategies. The primary objective of environmental finance is to regress the negative impacts of climate change through pricing and trading schemes. The field of environmental finance was established in response to the poor management of economic crises by governmental bodies globally. Environmental finance aims to reallocate business resources to improve the sustainability of investments whilst also retaining profit margins.

== History ==
In 1992, Richard L. Sandor proposed a new course outlining emission markets at the University of Chicago Booth School of Business, that would later be known as the course, Environmental Finance. Sandor anticipated a social shift in perspectives on the effects of global warming and wanted to be on the frontier of new research.

Prior to this in 1990, Sandor had been involved with the passing of the Clean Air Act Amendment for the Chicago Board of Trade, which aimed to reduce high sulfur dioxide levels following WW2. Inspired by the theory of social cost, Sandor focused on cap-and-trade strategies such as emission trading schemes and more flexible mechanisms including taxes and subsidies to manage environmental crisis. The implementation of cap-and-trade mechanisms was a contributing factor to the success of the Clean Air Act Amendment.

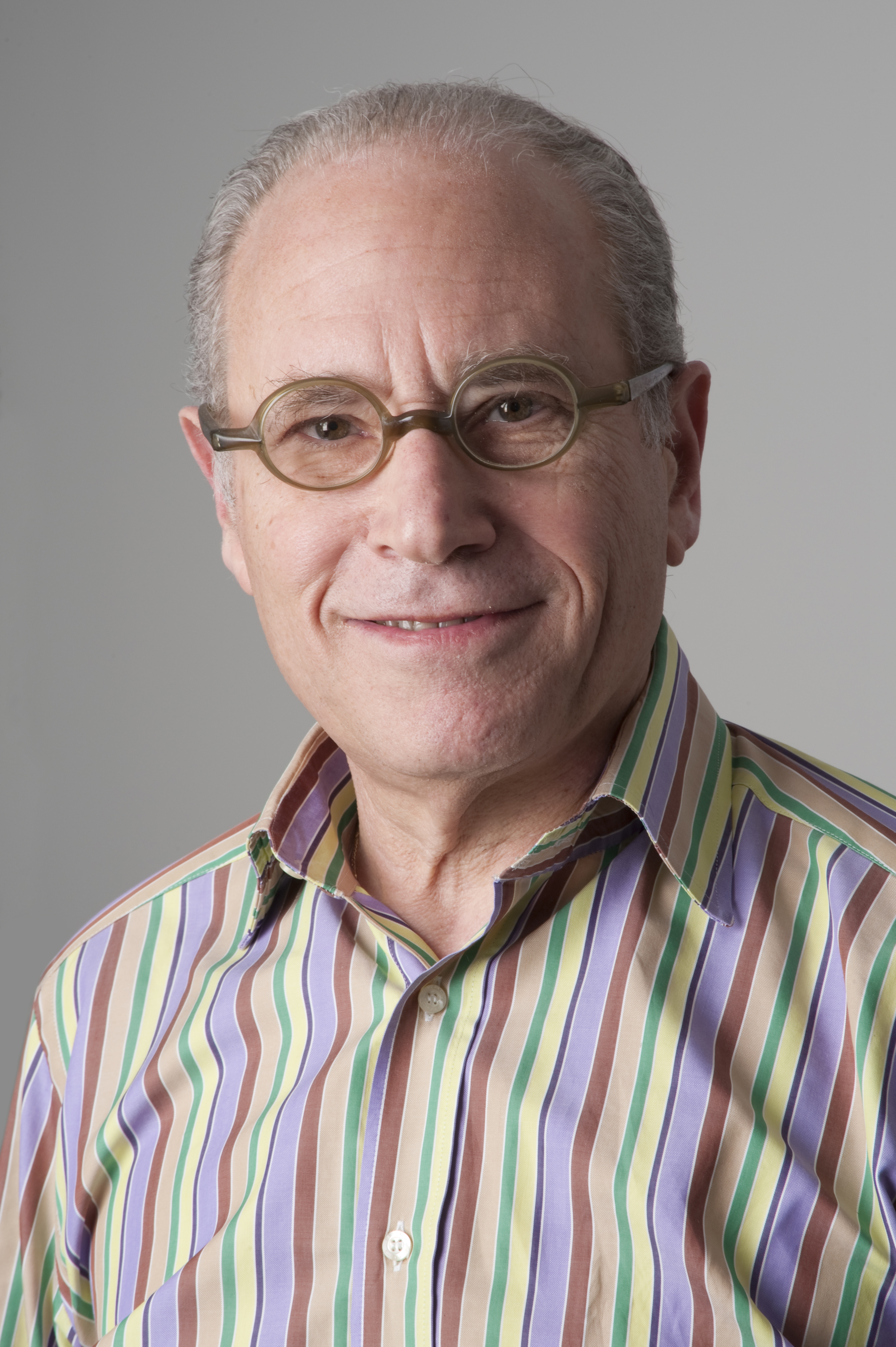
Dr Richard L. Sandor

Following the Clean Air Act in 1990, the United Nations Conference on Trade and Development approached the Chicago Board of Trade in 1991, to enquire about how the market-based instruments used to combat high atmospheric sulfur dioxide concentrations could be applied to the increasing levels of atmospheric carbon dioxide. Sandor created a framework consisting of four characteristics which could be used to describe the carbon market:

- Standardisation
- Unit Trading
- Price Basis
- Delivery

In 1997 the Kyoto Protocol was enacted and later enforced in 2005 by the United Nations Framework Convention on Climate Change. Included nations agreed to focus on reducing global greenhouse gas emissions through the market-based mechanism of emissions trading. Reductions averaged approximately 5% by 2012 which equates to almost 30% in reduction of total emissions. Some nations made significant progress under the Kyoto protocol, however as it only became law in 2005, nations such as the United States and China reported increased emissions, substantially offsetting progress made by other regions.

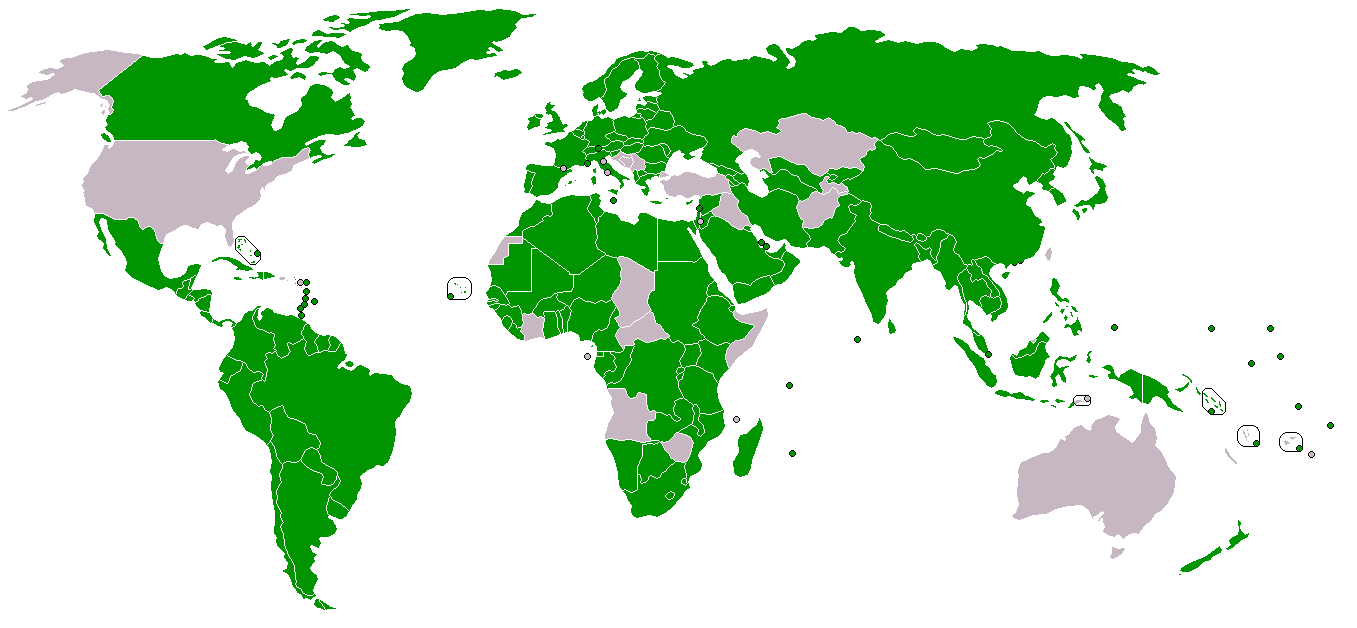
Nations involved in the 2005 Kyoto Protocol.

In 1999, the Dow Jones Sustainability Index was introduced to evaluate the ecological and social impact of stocks so shareholders could invest more sustainably. The index acts as an incentive for firms to improve their environmental footprint to attract more shareholders.

Later in 2000, the United Nations introduced the Millennium Development Goal scheme which sought to promote a sustainable framework for large multinational corporations and countries to follow to improve the environmental impact of financial investments. This framework facilitated the development of the United Nations Sustainable Development Goal scheme in 2015, which aimed to increase funding environmentally responsible investments in developing nations. Funding was targeted to improve areas such as primary education, gender equality, maternal health, and nutrition, with the overall goal of creating beneficial national relationships to decrease the ecological footprint of developing economies. Implementation of these frameworks has promoted greater participation and accountability of corporate environmental sustainability, with over 230 of the largest global firms reporting their sustainability metrics to the United Nations.

The United Nations Environment Program (UNEP) has had a detailed history in providing infrastructure to improve the environmental effects of financial investments. In 2004, the institute provided training on responsible environmental credit budgeting and management for Eastern European nations. After the 2008 financial crisis, the UNEP provided substantial support for future sustainable investment choices for economies such as Greece which were impacted severely. The Portfolio Decarbonisation Coalition established in 2014 is a significantly notable initiative in the history of environmental finance as it aims to establish an economy that is not dependent on investments with large carbon footprints. This goal is achieved through large-scale stakeholder reinvestment and securing long-term, responsible, investment commitments. Most recently, the UNEP has recommended OECD nations to align investment strategies alongside the objectives of the Paris Agreement, to improve long-term investments with significant ecological effects.

In 2008 the Climate Change Act enacted by the UK Government established a framework to limit greenhouse gasses and carbon emissions through a budgeting scheme, which motivated firms and businesses to reduce their carbon output for a financial reward. Specifically, by 2050 it seeks to reduce carbon emissions by 80% compared to levels in 1980. The Act seeks to achieve this goal by reviewing carbon budgeting schemes such emission trading credits, every 5 years to continually reassess and recalibrate relevant policies. The cost of reaching the 2050 goal has been estimated at approximately 1.5% of GDP, although the positive environmental impact of reducing carbon footprint and increased in investment into the renewable energy sector will offset this cost. A further implicated cost in the pursuit of the Act is a predicted £100 increase in annual household energy costs, however this price increase is set to be outweighed by an improved energy efficiency which will decrease fuel costs.

The 2010 cap and trade scheme introduced in the metropolitan regions of Tokyo was mandatory for businesses heavily dependent on fuel and electricity, who accounted for almost 20% of total carbon emissions in the area. The scheme aimed to reduce emissions by 17% by the end of 2019.

In 2011 the Clean Energy Act was enacted by the Australian Government. The act introduced the Carbon Tax which aimed to reduce greenhouse gas emission by charging large firms for their carbon tonnage. The Clean Energy Act facilitated the transition to an emissions trading scheme in 2014. The scheme also aims to fulfill the Australian Government's obligations in respect to the Kyoto Protocol and the Climate Change Convention. Additionally, the Act seeks to reduce emissions in a manner that will foster economic growth through increased market competition and investment into renewable energy sources. The Australian National Registry of Emissions Units regulates and monitors the use of emission credits utilised by the Act. Firms must enroll in the registry to buy and sell credits to compensate for their relevant reduction or over-consumption of carbon emissions.

The Republic of Korea's 2015 emission trading scheme aims to reduce carbon emissions by 37% by 2030. It strives to achieve this through allocating a quota of carbon emission to the largest carbon emitting businesses, resetting at the beginning of the schemes 3 separate phases.

In 2017 the National Mitigation Plan was passed by the Irish Government which aimed to regress climate change by decreasing emission levels through revised investment strategies and frameworks for power generation, agriculture, and transport The plan involves 106 separate guidelines for short and long term climate change mitigation.

The European Union Emission Trading Scheme concluding at the end of 2020 is the longest single global carbon pricing scheme, which has been improved over its three 5-year phases. Current improvements include a centralised emission credit trading system, auctioning of credits, addressing a broader range of green house gasses and the introduction of a European-wide credit cap instead of national caps.

The terminology of sustainable finance has evolved over time alongside policy frameworks and market practices. A review study in 2026 demonstrated that early research primarily used fragmented concepts such as ethical finance, socially responsible investment, and environmental finance, before the gradual consolidation of the field around ESG-based sustainable finance. Their periodization clarifies the differences and similarities between the rival terms (carbon finance, climate finance, environmental finance, green finance and sustainable finance). The authors distinguish three main periods: The first period spans from the 1970s to 2010. During this time, the theoretical foundations were established, and following the publication of the Brundtland Report, the first green financial instruments and the first targeted research emerged. The establishment of the Green Climate Fund (2010) was followed by the eras of carbon, environmental, and climate finance. Collectively, this constitutes the era of early sustainable finance research, which lasted until 2021, the year of COP26. This is followed by the era of mature research, characterized by green and sustainable finance.

== Strategies ==
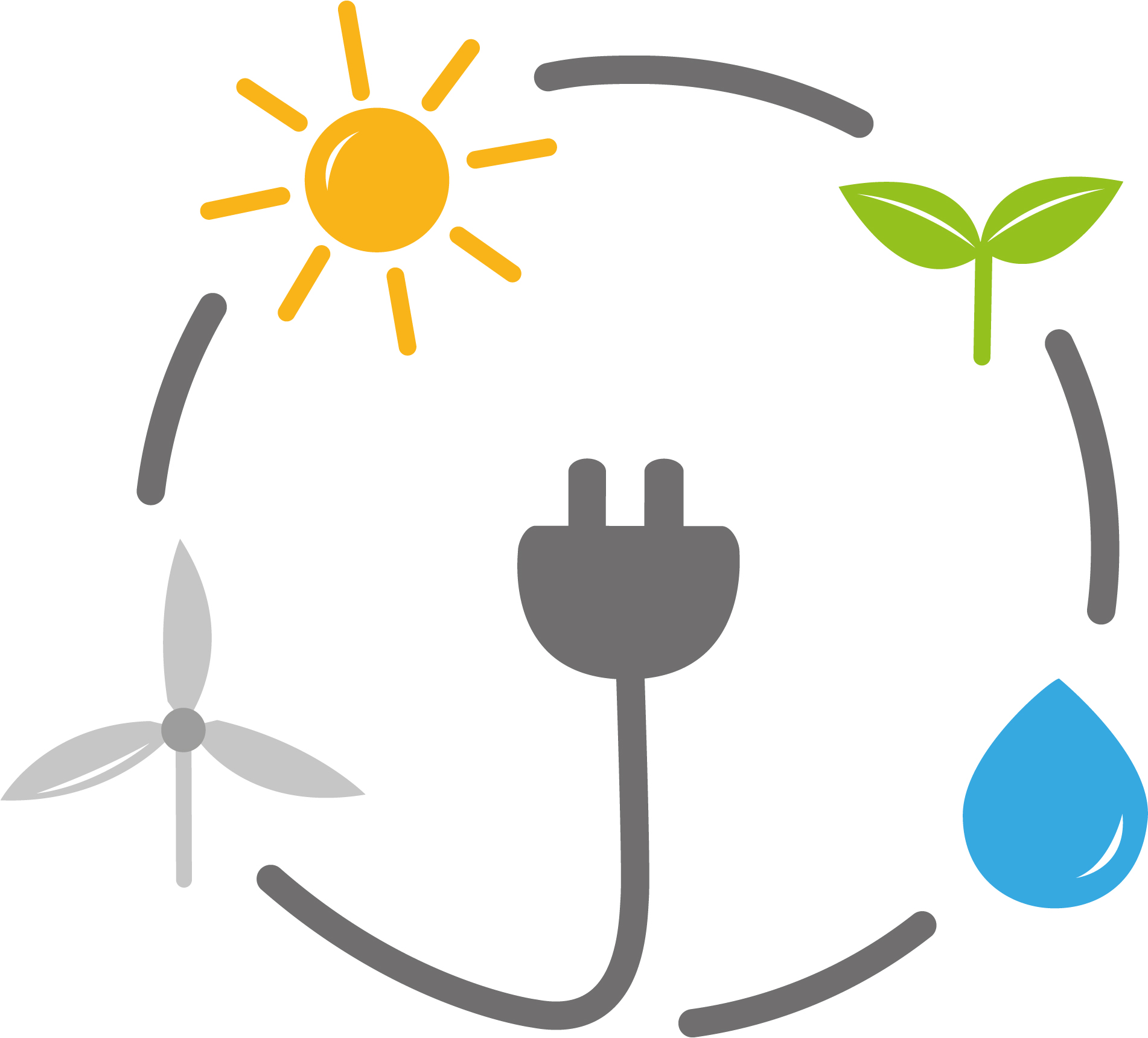
Renewable Energy Schematic

Societal shifts from fossil fuels to renewable energy caused by an increased awareness of climate change has made government bodies and firms re-evaluate investment strategies to avoid irreparable ecological damage. Shifts away from fossil fuels also increase demand into alternate energy sources which requires revised investment strategies.

The initial stage to mitigate climate change through financial tools involves ecological and economic forecasting to model future impacts of current investment methodologies on the environment. This allows for an approximate estimation of future environments; however, the impacts of continued harmful business trends need to be observed under a non-linear perspective.

Cap-and-trade mechanisms limit the total amount of emissions a particular region or country can emit. Firms are issued with tradeable permits which they can buy or sell. This acts as a financial incentive to reduce emissions and as a disincentive to exceed emission caps.

In 2005, the European Union Emission Trading Scheme was established and is now the largest emission trading scheme globally.

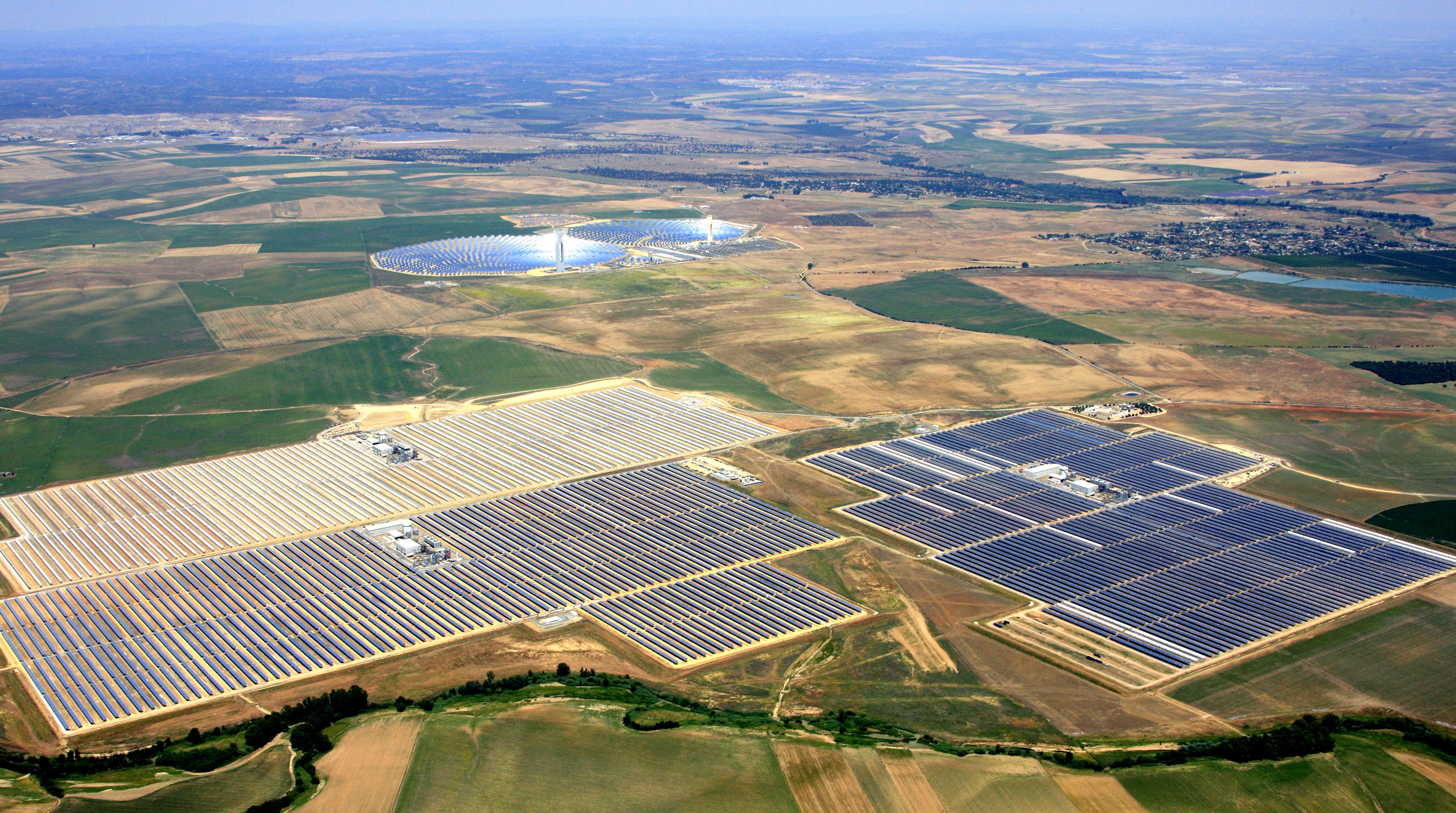
Solar Panel Infrastructure

In 2013, the Québec Cap-and-trade scheme was established and is currently the primary mitigation strategy for the area.

Direct foreign investment into developing nations provide more efficient and sustainable energy sources.

In 2006, the Clean Development Mechanism was formed under the Kyoto Protocol, providing solar power and new technologies to developing nations. Countries who invest into developing nations can receive emission reduction credits as a reward.

Removal of atmospheric carbon dioxide has been proposed as a solution to mitigate climate change, by increasing tree densities to absorb carbon dioxide. Other methods involve new technologies which are still in research development stages.

Research in environmental finance has sought how to strategically invest in clean technologies. When paired with international legislation, such as the case of the Montreal Protocol on Substances that Deplete the Ozone Layer, environmentally based investments have stimulated emerging industries and reduced the consequences of climate change. The international collaboration would ultimately lead to the changes that repaired the hole in the ozone layer.

=== Climate finance ===
Investments in sustainable energy (clean energy) is an example of climate finance. It has increased due to high fossil fuel prices and growing policy support across various nations. By 2025, investment in the energy transition had grown to about twice that for fossil fuels (oil, natural gas and coal).

Climate finance is an umbrella term for financial resources such as loans, grants, or domestic budget allocations for climate change mitigation, adaptation or resiliency. Finance can come from private and public sources. It can be channeled by various intermediaries such as multilateral development banks or other development agencies. Those agencies are particularly important for the transfer of public resources from developed to developing countries in light of UN Climate Convention obligations that developed countries have.

There are two main sub-categories of climate finance based on different aims. Mitigation finance is investment that aims to reduce global carbon emissions. Adaptation finance aims to respond to the consequences of climate change. Globally, there is a much greater focus on mitigation, accounting for over 90% of spending on climate. Renewable energy is an important growth area for mitigation investment and has growing policy support.

Finance can come from private and public sources, and sometimes the two can intersect to create financial solutions. It is widely recognized that public budgets will be insufficient to meet the total needs for climate finance, and that private finance will be important to close the finance gap. Many different financial models or instruments have been used for financing climate actions. For example green bonds, carbon offsetting, and payment for ecosystem services are some promoted solutions. There is considerable innovation in this area. Transfer of solutions that were not developed specifically for climate finance is also taking place, such as public–private partnerships and blended finance.

While public funding plays an important role in U.S. climate finance, the majority of climate-related investment in the United States is provided by private sources. According to the International Energy Agency, most clean energy and low-carbon investment in advanced economies is financed through private capital, including corporate balance sheets, project finance, bank lending, and capital markets, with public policy primarily serving to reduce risk and improve investment incentives. Public climate policies such as tax credits, loan guarantees, and regulatory standards are therefore designed not only to fund projects directly but also to mobilize significantly larger volumes of private investment toward mitigation and resilience objectives.

There are many challenges with climate finance. Firstly, there are difficulties with measuring and tracking financial flows. Secondly, there are also questions around equitable financial support to developing countries for cutting emissions and adapting to impacts. It is also difficult to provide suitable incentives for investments from the private sector.

== Impact ==
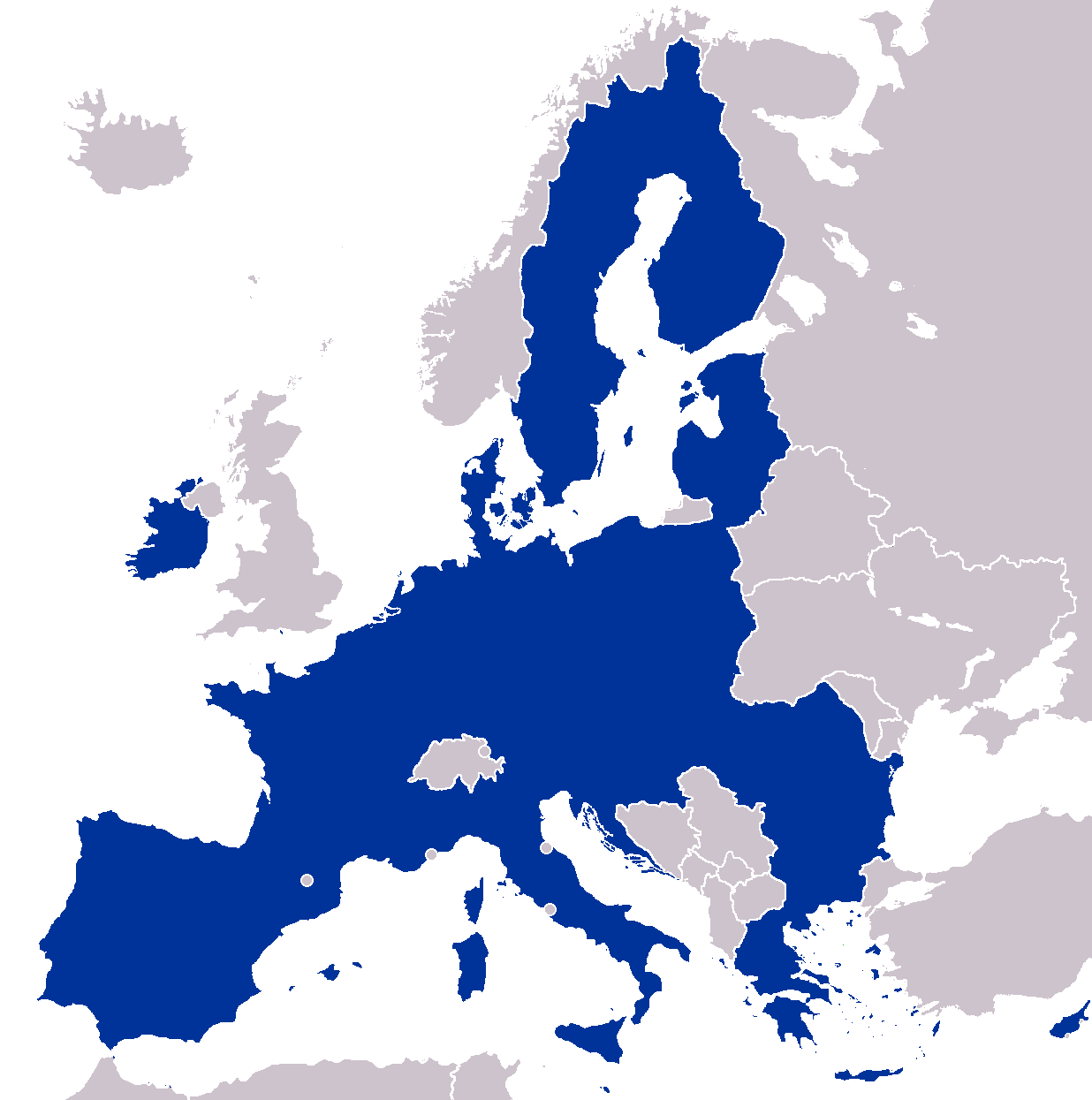
European Union map

The European Union Emission Trading Scheme from 2008-2012 was responsible for a 7% reduction in emissions for the states within the scheme. In 2013, allowances were reviewed to accommodate for new emission reduction targets. The new annual recommended target was a reduction of 1.72%. It is estimated that reducing the amount of quoted credits was restricted more tightly, emissions could have been reduced by a total of 25%. Nations such as Romania, Poland and Sweden experienced significant revenue, benefiting from selling credits. Despite successfully reducing emissions, the European Union Emission Trading Scheme has been critiqued for its lack of flexibility to accommodate to major shifts in the economic landscape and reassess currents contexts to provide a revised cap on trading credits, potentially undermining the original objective of the scheme.

The New Zealand Emissions Trading Scheme of 2008 was modelled to increase annual household energy expenditure to 0.8% and increase fuel prices by approximately 6%. The price of agricultural products such as beef and dairy were modelled to decrease by almost 1%. Price increases in carbon intensive sectors such as foresting and mining were also expected, incentivising a shift towards renewable energy system and improved investment strategies with a less harmful environmental impact.

In 2016, the Québec Cap-and-trade scheme was responsible for an 11% reduction in emissions compared to 1990 emission levels. Due to the associated increased energy costs, fuel prices rose 2-3 cents per litre over the duration of the cap and trade scheme.

In 2014, the Clean Development Mechanism was responsible for a 1% reduction in global greenhouse gas emissions. The Clean Development Mechanism has been responsible for removing 7 billion tons of greenhouse gasses from the atmosphere through the efforts of almost 8000 individual projects. Despite this success, as the economies of developing nations participating in Clean Development Mechanisms improves, the financial payout to the country supplying such infrastructure increases at a greater rate than economic growth, thus leading to an unoptimised and counterproductive system.
