= List of global issues =

List of environmental and other issues affecting life on Earth

A global issue is a matter of public concern worldwide. This list of global issues presents the problems or phenomena affecting people around the world, including but not limited to widespread social issues, economic issues, and environmental issues. Organizations that maintain or have published an official list of global issues include the United Nations, and the World Economic Forum.

== Global catastrophic risks ==
Not all of these risks are independent, because the majority are a result of human activity.

- Biodiversity loss
- Climate change
- Destructive artificial intelligence
- Environmental disaster
- Nuclear holocaust
- Pandemic
- Biotechnology risk
- Molecular nanotechnology
- Societal collapse

== United Nations list ==
The UN has listed issues that it deems to be the most pressing as of 2023:

Category	Issues	Relevant UN directives/initiatives
Africa	poverty, diseases, desertification, malnutrition, regional conflict, Corruption, Unemployment	Office of the Special Adviser on Africa, African Union, New Partnership for Africa’s Development, United Nations–African Union Mission in Darfur
Ageing	ageing population, demographic transition	Vienna International Plan of Action on Ageing, United Nations Principles for Older Persons, Proclamation on Ageing, International Year of Older Persons
AIDS	Prevention of HIV/AIDS, HIV and pregnancy, HIV/AIDS denialism	Joint United Nations Programme on HIV/AIDS, The Global Fund to Fight AIDS, Tuberculosis and Malaria
Atomic energy	nuclear weapons, nuclear waste	International Atomic Energy Agency, Treaty on the Non-Proliferation of Nuclear Weapons, Comprehensive Nuclear-Test-Ban Treaty
Big data for sustainable development	Applying ICTs to sustainable development	supporting and tracking the Sustainable Development Goals
Child and youth safety online	Fighting cyberbullying, online child abuse and human trafficking of children	
Children	Child poverty, Child labour, Child abuse, Child mortality, Global education || Education First, United Nations Children’s Fund (UNICEF), World Food Programme, Global Education First Initiative	
Climate change	Carbon footprint of the human race, Climate change mitigation	Kyoto Protocol, Paris Agreement, United Nations Climate Change conference
Decolonization	exploitation	United Nations Special Committee on Decolonization, United Nations Trust Territories, International Decade for the Eradication of Colonialism
Democracy	democratization	Universal Declaration of Human Rights, International Covenant on Civil and Political Rights, UNDP, UNDEF, DPKO, DPA, OHCHR, UN Women
Disarmament	weapons of mass destruction, chemical and biological weapons, conventional weapons, landmines and small arms	United Nations Office for Disarmament Affairs
Ending poverty	Measuring poverty	Sustainable Development Goal #1: No poverty
Food	world hunger, sustainable agriculture, food security, safety, food riots	Sustainable Development Goal #2: Zero hunger, Food and Agriculture Organization (FAO), World Food Programme
Gender equality	Women's rights, global feminism	Commission on the Status of Women, Entity for Gender Equality and the Empowerment of Women (UN Women)
Health	maternal health, extreme poverty	Millennium Development Goals
Human rights	human rights violations	Universal Declaration of Human Rights
International law and justice	war crimes, discrimination, state-corporate crime	International Law Commission, Convention on the Prevention and Punishment of the Crime of Genocide (1948), International Convention on the Elimination of All Forms of Racial Discrimination (1965), International Covenant on Civil and Political Rights (1966), International Covenant on Economic, Social and Cultural Rights (1966), Convention on the Elimination of All Forms of Discrimination against Women (1979), United Nations Convention on the Law of the Sea (1982), Convention on the Rights of the Child (1989), Comprehensive Nuclear-Test-Ban Treaty (1996), International Convention for the Suppression of the Financing of Terrorism (1999), Convention on the Rights of Persons with Disabilities (2006)
International migration	Human migration	International Organization for Migration
Oceans and the Law of the Sea (cf. Water)	marine pollution, ocean governance	United Nations Conference on the Human Environment, Convention on the Prevention of Marine Pollution by Dumping of Wastes and Other Matter
Peace and security		United Nations peacekeeping, List of United Nations peacekeeping missions, Peacebuilding Commission
People with disabilities	discrimination, lack of universal design	Convention on the Rights of Persons with Disabilities
Population	overpopulation, world population	UNFPA
Refugees (cf. Humanitarian Assistance)		United Nations Relief and Rehabilitation Administration (UNRRA), United Nations High Commissioner for Refugees (UNHCR)
Terrorism		Comprehensive Convention on International Terrorism
Volunteerism		United Nations Volunteers
Water (cf. Oceans and the Law of the Sea)	water scarcity, water conflict, water privatization, water pollution	UN-Water, System of Environmental and Economic Accounting for Water, Water for Life Decade, International Recommendations on Water Statistics, United Nations Water Conference, Millennium Development Goals, International Conference on Water and the Environment (1992), Earth Summit (1992)

As part of the 2030 Agenda for Sustainable Development, the UN Millennium Development Goals (2000-2015) were superseded by the UN Sustainable Development Goals (2016-2030), which are also known as The Global Goals. There are associated Targets and Indicators for each Global Goal.

== World Economic Forum List ==
In keeping with their economy-centered view, the World Economic Forum formulated a list of 10 most pressing points in 2016:

1. Food security
2. Inclusive growth
3. Future of work/unemployment
4. Climate change
5. 2008 financial crisis
6. Future of the internet/Fourth Industrial Revolution
7. Gender equality
8. Global trade and investment and regulatory frameworks
9. Long-term investment/Investment strategy
10. Future healthcare

== Global environmental issues ==
No single issue can be analysed, treated, or isolated from the others. For example, habitat loss and climate change adversely affect biodiversity. Deforestation and pollution are direct consequences of overpopulation and both, in turn, affect biodiversity. While overpopulation locally leads to rural flight, this is more than counterbalanced by accelerating urbanization and urban sprawl. Theories like the world-system theory and the Gaia hypothesis focus on the inter-dependency aspect of environmental and economic issues. Among the most evident environmental problems are:

- Overconsumption – situation where resource use has outpaced the sustainable capacity of the ecosystem.
- Overpopulation – too many people for the planet to sustain.
- Biodiversity loss
- Food waste
- Deforestation
- Desertification
- Global warming/climate change
- Habitat destruction
- Soil degradation
- Holocene extinction
- Ocean acidification
- Ozone depletion
- Pollution
  - Waste and waste disposal
  - Water pollution
  - Air pollution
- Resource depletion
- Urban sprawl

== See also ==
- Sustainable Development Goals – United Nations goals for people for 2030
- Antimicrobial resistance – Resistance of microbes to drugs directed against them
- Center for Global Food Issues
- Chicago Council on Global Affairs – Foreign affairs think tank in Chicago, Illinois, US
- Climate change – Human-caused changes to climate on Earth
- Cybersecurity – Protection of computer systems from information disclosure, theft or damage
- Developing country – Nation with a relatively low living standard
- Earth Economics – U.S. non-profit organization
- Earth system science – Scientific study of the Earth's spheres and their natural integrated systems
- Ecological footprint – Individual's or a group's human demand on nature
- Ecological collapse – Ecological communities abruptly losing biodiversity, often irreversibly
- Ecosystem collapse – Ecological communities abruptly losing biodiversity, often irreversibly
- Effective altruism – Philosophical and social movement
- Energy crisis – Low availability of energy resources
- Environmental social science – Interaction of humans with the environment
- Financial crisis – Situation in which financial assets suddenly lose a large part of their nominal value
- Global catastrophic risk – Hypothetical global-scale disaster risk
- Global Challenges Foundation – Swedish non-profit organization
- Global change – Planetary-scale changes in the Earth system
- Global governance – Movement towards political cooperation among transnational actors
- Global health – Health of populations in a global context
- Global justice – Issue in political philosophy
- Global Rights – Human rights capacity-building NGO
- Global warming controversy – List of debates over global warming
- Human impact on the environment – Impact of human life on Earth and environment
- Human security – People-centric approach to national security
- Intergovernmental organization – Organization established by treaty between governments
- List of United Nations peacekeeping missions – List of all former and current United Nations peacekeeping missions
- Liu Institute for Global Issues – Research organization at the University of British Columbia
- Mass surveillance – Intricate surveillance of an entire or a substantial fraction of a population
- Multilateralism – Alliance between multiple countries in pursuit of a common goal
- Ozone depletion and climate change
- Pandemic – Widespread, often global, epidemic of severe infectious disease
- Peak oil – Point in time when the maximum rate of petroleum extraction is reached
- Social justice – Concept in political philosophy
- Species extinction – Termination of a species' lineage
- Washington consensus – Economic policies for developing nations
- Wicked problem – Problem that is difficult or impossible to solve
- World Community Grid – BOINC based volunteer computing project to aid scientific research
- WorldRiskReport – Annual cooperation report on global disaster risks
- World-systems theory – Approach emphasizing the world-system as the primary unit of social analysis
- World War – War involving major global states
- Crime – Unlawful act punishable by an authority

== Literature ==
- John L. Seitz, Kristen A. Hite (2012). Global Issues (4 ed.). Wiley-Blackwell. ISBN 978-0-470-65564-1.
- Richard J. Payne (2012). Global Issues (4th ed.). Pearson. ISBN 978-0205854592.
- Michael T. Snarr, D. Neil Snarr, ed. (2012). Introducing Global Issues (5th ed.). Lynne Rienner Pub. ISBN 978-1588268457.
- Shirley A. Fedorak (2013). Global Issues: A Cross-Cultural Perspective Paperback. University of Toronto Press. ISBN 978-1442605961.
- Global Education Magazine
- Global Environmental Politics
