= Environmental protection expenditure accounts =

Environmental protection expenditure accounts (EPEA) are a statistical framework that describes environmental activities in monetary terms and organises these statistics into a full set of accounts, just like that of the national accounts. The EPEA is part of the System of Integrated Environmental and Economic Accounting which, in March 2012, was adopted as a statistical standard by the United Nations Statistical Commission.

The EPEA results in a net national total expenditure for environmental protection of an economy. The statistics are usually presented by economic sectors (government, industries, households) and by what environmental domain has been protected, i.e. water, air, biodiversity etc.

The main types of statistics that feed into the framework are investment statistics, statistics on current outlays, government statistics on subsidies and investment grants, all with bearing on protection of the environment.

The statistics cover actual outlays. This means that, for example, losses of income are not seen in the statistics with the exception of specific transfers (or subsidies) that are designed to compensate any economic losses. Neither do the statistics cover all activities that might have a beneficial environmental impact. There is a distinction between the purpose of the activity and the effect of the activity. For example, new production equipment that is installed solely for the purpose of increasing productivity and reducing costs may use energy and materials more efficiently, and as a side effect reduce environmental discharges. The expenditure for this new equipment would not be included in EPE.

The main aim of the statistics is to provide indicators to show the response of society to reduce pollution. The statistics can be used in different types of analysis. One type of analysis determines whether the "polluter pays" principle holds, i.e. whether those who pollute are also the ones who pay for remediation and clean-up. It can also be used to analyse the effects on enterprise competitiveness, for cost-effective analysis related to propositions of new regulations and policies.

== Scope ==
In order to create the statistics on environmental protection expenditure (EPE) an international definition has been agreed upon.

"Environmental protection groups together all actions and activities that are aimed at the prevention, reduction and elimination of pollution as well as any other degradation of the environment. This includes measures taken in order to restore the environment after it has been degraded due to the pressures from human activities".1994 SERIEE §2006 and SEEA Central Framework chapter 4

This definition delimitates the area so that hygiene and security are excluded as well as management of natural resources.

The full sequence of EPEA are compiled through five different tables that interact with one another. The tables are established, just like the national accounts on a double-entry bookkeeping system. They were developed this way so that consistent indicators with the national accounts could be ensured. The tables cover statistics on production of environmental protection activities, the use of environmental protection services (e.g. waste management or waste water management services), how the financing of environmental protection happens and a supply and use tables and net cost of environmental protection (what is the final expenditure and who is bearing the expenditure.)

== Collecting the underlying statistics ==
The EPEA framework consists of five different tables and covers the economy and the transactions of it. In order to fill the tables several different data sources need to be collected and attributed to the correct place in the framework tables. The data sources would be taken from existing information such as the National accounts, from business statistics or government finance statistics. But sometimes a statistical office would need to undertake a special investigation to find the correct information.

=== Specialised producers ===
Specialised producers of environmental protection services are defined as activities that are focused on servicing the environment. That means waste management activities and activities for waste water management: "all those producers whose principal activity is the production of environmental protection (EP) services, regardless of whether they belong to the private or public producers group or if they carry out market or non-market activities"

Businesses undertaking e.g. waste management can be either market or non-market actors. This means that they're either owned by a public entity (such as a local government) or by a private actor. It is important to the EPEA tables that this distinction is made in the statistics.

If statistics are published according to e.g. International Standard Industrial Classification economic statistics for the following codes could be collected:

- Division E – Water supply; sewerage, waste management and remediation activities
- ISIC 37 – Sewerage
- ISIC 38 – Waste collection, treatment and disposal activities; materials recovery
- ISIC 39 – Remediation activities and other waste management services

=== Secondary non-specialised producers ===
Secondary non-specialised producers are actors that performs environmental protection services but not as a primary activity. This means for example that a business in the chemical industry sells excess energy to the local energy grid would be a secondary non-specialised producer (as its primary activity is the production of chemicals.)

These types of activities are rarely seen in statistics published.

=== Ancillary non-specialised producers ===
In most countries the statistics are collected through sample surveys conducted by national statistical offices. This means that, in general, businesses are requested to fill out questionnaires with specific questions about their past investments or current outlays with bearing on environmental protection. The respondents of a survey needs to know if any new equipment has been installed in the production process, if it has an environmental component to it and how much this extra component could be worth (in monetary terms). The respondent also has to know how the new equipment is reducing environmental pressure, i.e. within what environmental domain (air, waste, waste water etc.) the equipment is working for.

== Interpreting the statistics ==
The basic message of the statistics is to show how much money has been spent on protecting the environment from human activities in past years. If the statistics is presented within the accounting framework of EPE then the statistics also show who has spent the money and who has financed the spending.

Current international statistics of Eurostat presents statistics on investments and current expenditure for the protection of the environment. In 2006 Europe spent around 1.8 percent of Gross Domestic Product on treating and preventing environmental pollution through investments and current expenditure.

To know who spent how much and on what has its advantages, it provides an insight on how the area is perceived comparing one sector to another. It also show which sectors are under more pressure to undo the damage to the environment that their specific production are creating. However, the statistics becomes much more interesting when comparing the amount spent to the environmental burden the sector is having. For example, are the highest investments made in for example the reduction of air pollution made by the sector that has the largest emission of for example green house gases? Eurostat made an attempt at showing this for some of the European countries. The publication shows that this is not always the case.

Another study, based on Swedish statistics show that enterprises that has internal research and development (R&D) departments which also work on environmental R&D are more likely to invest in environmental protection then if they have not.

== History ==
Statistics on environmental protection expenditure follows the recommendations of the Chapter XXI of the 1993 System of National Accounts. Eurostat, national statistical offices and experts gathered to develop a whole new type of statistics. The result became a manual called European System for the Collection of Economic Information on the Environment (SERIEE).

The manual presented a conceptual statistical framework for a monetary description of environmental protection activities and to some extent resource management activities.

After the publication of SERIEE European statistical offices started to test and develop this new type of statistics. Much due to the adoption of variables on pollution prevention (integrated) investments, pollution treatment (end-of-pipe) investments and current expenditure on environmental protection in the Structural Business Statistics Regulation 58/97 in 2002 part of the EPEA were developed faster.

The evaluation of SERIEE were focused on the EPEA framework and several countries provided pilot studies on the topic. Examples are Belgium, France, and Germany among other countries.

At the same time, the System of Integrated Environmental and Economic Accounting (SEEA) were being developed. The manual SEEA 2003 manual adopted the EPEA as part of their work and environmental protection expenditure statistics became recognised world wide.

Throughout this time Eurostat and the OECD has collected data in this field in a joint data collection scheme, by gentlemen's agreement. This means that the countries receiving the questionnaire are not obliged to answer under any legal obligation but do so out of voluntary agreement. A simplified EPEA has been the requirement and investments, current expenditure, revenues and subsidies/transfers for environmental protection has been the targeted variables of statistics. These variables are often also considered official statistics.

Recent discussions in the statistical community are the proposal to include the EPEA tables in full or in a simplified form in the adopted Regulation (EU) No 691/2011 of the European Parliament and of the Council of 6 July 2011 on European environmental economic accounts.

== Implementation ==
The studies in late 1990s indicated that the EPEA were difficult to compile, i.e. in the sense that numerous types of statistics were required and the gaps of information in the tables provided results that were uncertain at best. Even more recent studies have concluded the same thing.

A few countries have found the compilation of the EPEA feasible and can provide results that are viable. For example, Italy and Belgium produce the accounts on a regular basis.

The general approach is, however, not to complete the full EPEA but to show, specifically, investments and current expenditure for environmental protection by the environmental domain the activity has been implemented in.

== See also ==
=== SEEA modules ===
- Economy-wide material flow accounts
- System of Environmental and Economic Accounting for Water
- System of Integrated Environmental and Economic Accounting

=== Other related articles ===
- Green accounting
- Input–output model
- System of National Accounts
