= Artificial Intelligence for Environment & Sustainability =

Non-profit research project

Artificial Intelligence for Environment & Sustainability (ARIES) is an international non-profit research project hosted by the Basque Centre for Climate Change (BC3) headquartered in Bilbao, Spain. It was created to integrate scientific computational models for environmental sustainability assessment and policy-making, through ecoinformatics.

== Technology and applications ==
ARIES seeks to integrate scientific data and models that simulate environmental and socioeconomic systems to address linked scientific modelling problems, through semantics (computer science), FAIR data and models, and an open-source software infrastructure called Knowledge Laboratory (k.LAB) to semantically describe, code, and distribute data and models for end-users, modellers, and network administrators.

ARIES currently includes two web-based applications: the k.Explorer and the ARIES for SEEA Explorer. Released in Fall 2018, k.Explorer is an interface that allows non-technical users to run sophisticated models. The ARIES for SEEA Explorer was released in April 2021 by BC3 in collaboration with the Statistics Division of the United Nations Department of Economic and Social Affairs (UN DESA) and the United Nations Environment Programme (UNEP) for rapid, standardized and customizable natural capital accounting. Shortly following the adoption of the System of Integrated Environmental and Economic Accounting (SEEA) Ecosystem Accounting standard by United Nations in March 2021, the ARIES for SEEA Explorer was made available on the UN Global Platform in order to accelerate SEEA's implementation worldwide.

== History and partners ==
The ARIES Project started in April 2007 at the Gund Institute for Ecological Economics of the University of Vermont, United States, sponsored by a $1M grant from the U.S. government's National Science Foundation. A prototype of the model building system was developed over the following year, and a functional prototype was made available online in 2012. Since 2010, the project has been based at BC3, where the technology has continued developing ever since. Since 2013, the ARIES team has held the International Spring University (ISU) on Ecosystem Services Modelling, an annual intensive modelling school for scientists and policy analysts working in the environmental sustainability field.

ARIES is led from a global hub at BC3.

== See also ==
- Environmental impact of artificial intelligence
