= Food security in Chad =

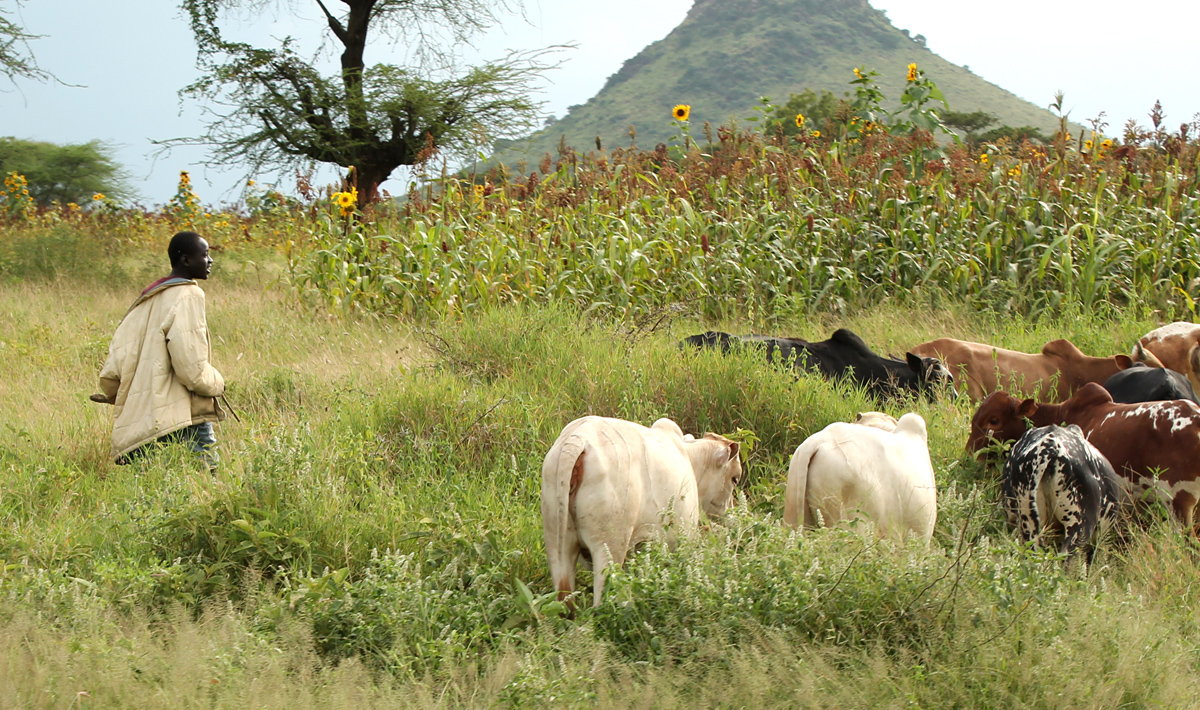
A farmer in Chad. Over 80% of the population is employed in agriculture in Chad's predominantly agrarian economy.

Chad currently suffers from widespread food insecurity. A majority of the population of Chad now suffers some form of malnutrition. 87% of its population lives below the poverty line. Because the country is arid, landlocked, and prone to droughts, many Chadians struggle to meet their daily nutritional needs. While international aid into the country has brought some relief, the situation in Chad remains severe due to broader famine in the Sahel region. The World Food Programme has declared a state of emergency in the region since early 2018, stating that, “...adding to the poverty, food insecurity and malnutrition which already affects [the nations of the Sahel] to varying degrees, drought, failed harvests and the high prices of staple foods have hastened the arrival of this year’s ‘lean season’ – the worst since 2014.” Malnutrition is high, especially among women and children, with a significant majority of all children in Chad suffering from some form of stunted growth or adverse health effects as a result. As such, health in Chad is greatly affected by lack of food. Food insecurity is a symptom of broader instability in Chad, which suffers from political, ethnic, and religious instability. These issues have contributed to long-term food insecurity in Chad.

== Cause ==
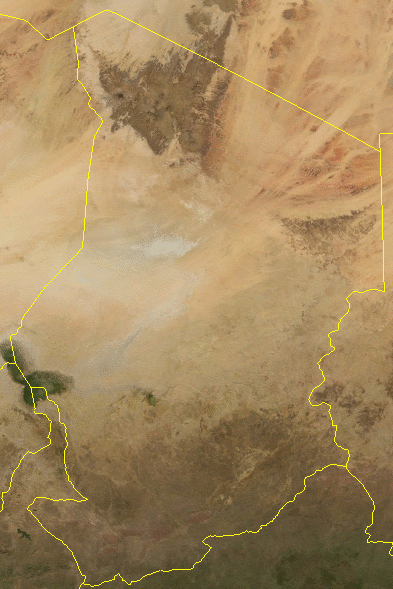
Chad's northern half is covered by the Sahara desert, reducing the amount of arable land significantly.

=== Environment and geography ===
Chad is an arid, landlocked nation, dominated geographically by the Sahara desert, with only the south being suitable for large-scale food-growing. The lack of arable land often means that Chadian citizens see great difficulties in growing enough food for themselves or for sale, resulting in an agricultural market mainly geared towards non-edible crops such as cotton. Nearly 80% of all Chadian labourers work in the agricultural sector, but the focus on non-edible crops means that food is still limited.

Chadian crops are also vulnerable to attacks from insects such as locusts, which flourish in the arid Chadian climate. Due to these insect attacks, not only do Chadian food crops frequently fail, but they also expose Chadian agricultural labourers to further hardship by depriving them of income. This agricultural instability continues to hamper efforts to alleviate food insecurity, as well as feed into the widespread poverty in the country.

The broader famine in the Sahel region has amplified the issue of food insecurity in Chad. Weather factors such as declining and more unpredictable rainfall lower Chadian crop yields by a significant amount. Desertification of semi-arid land in the southern region of Chad also impacts food production. As a result, when natural disasters like widespread locust attacks or regional droughts impact Chadian agriculture, the cost of food is raised beyond the ability of the average Chadian citizen to pay for. Farmers are also placed in considerable economic difficulty by these disasters, often becoming reliant on foreign aid supplies of seeds and grain to remain in the market.

=== Economic ===
Poverty is a major factor in the severity of Chad's food insecurity situation. Chad is one of the poorest countries on the planet, with nearly 9 out of every 10 Chadian citizens living under the poverty line. According to the Human Development Index, Chad is ranked 186th out of 188 countries as of 2017. High levels of poverty, in addition to high food prices as a result of scarcity, make it very difficult for Chadians to purchase food. In addition, the difficulty in procuring or growing food in Chad has led to food prices being higher than the average laborer can afford to pay for.

A major recession spurred by the slump in global oil prices combined with instability within Chad has caused further erosion of governmental power, resulting a loss of income due to the popular livestock trade with Nigeria dwindling as a result. Issues stemming from famine in the Sahel region have also had an impact on Chadian economic output.

Political

Since Chad gained independence from France, food production in the country has declined. The nation of Chad includes over 200 ethnic minorities, as well as being split between a Muslim north and a Christian south, similar to the religious divide in neighboring Sudan and South Sudan. Ethnic and religious tensions, in addition to the lack of a strong central government, make the creation of a central network of food distribution extremely difficult. As much of the country does not have a governmental presence, tribal militias often interfere with international aid groups attempting to deliver food supplies. Continuing low-level conflicts and general instability make reliable delivery of aid an impossibility.

== Statistics ==
According to the Global Hunger Index, Chad is currently ranked 118th out of 119 qualifying countries, surpassed only by its southern neighbor, the Central African Republic. It is estimated that 350,000 people in Chad are facing imminent starvation. In addition, 87% of all children in Chad suffer from some form of malnutrition, with 45% suffering from stunted growth. Stunted children also find it more difficult to attend school, further hampering their overall education and economic prospects. Rates of malnutrition also tend to be higher in rural areas than in urbanized areas, as Chad's national infrastructure is in poor condition.

== Alleviation ==
Several international, national, and private non-governmental agencies have programs currently operating in Chad.

=== World Bank ===
The World Bank has invested significant resources in combating food insecurity in Chad. The World Bank is focused in particular on addressing availability of food and agricultural goods. Operations include the Emergency Food and Livestock Crisis Response and Climate Resilient Agriculture and Productivity Enhancement Project. These projects in particular are attempting to address the lack of food available at any given time for Chadians, as well as the climate-related issues encountered by Chadian farmers.

The World Food Programme is extensively involved in the response to food insecurity in Chad and the Sahel region.

=== World Food Programme ===
The World Food Programme is working to address food insecurity in the region, as well as Chad in particular. The World Food Programme is focused in particular on addressing availability of food and agricultural goods. 1.4 million people in Chad are currently being supported with emergency food aid by the World Food Programme. In addition to food distribution efforts, the World Food Programme also provides cash-based transfers to people in the Lake Chad area, in order to bolster economic activity in the region. The World Food Programme also provides nutritional assistance to 370,000 refugees from the Central African Republic and Sudan who have taken up residence in 19 camps within Chad.

=== USAID ===
USAID provides resources to help address malnutrition among Chadians. They provide food assistance in tandem with the World Food Programme to support food distributions for Chadians as well as refugees from the Central African Republic and Sudan. In total, $62.9 million in assistance was provided by USAID in Fiscal Year 2018.

=== Action Against Hunger ===
Action Against Hunger is a private charity currently operating on donations to assist in famine relief efforts across the world. In Chad, they helped 274,160 people in 2017 to reach nutritional and medical assistance, as well as improved access to clean water and sanitation programs. Significant unrest in the country has left national infrastructure in poor condition, which hampers their efforts to reach communities in rural areas of the nation.
