= Natural capital accounting =

Calculation of total stocks and flows of natural resources and services

Natural capital accounting is the process of calculating the total stocks and flows of natural resources and services in a given ecosystem or region. Accounting for such goods may occur in physical or monetary terms. This process can subsequently inform government, corporate and consumer decision making as each relates to the use or consumption of natural resources and land, and sustainable behaviour.

== Methods of accounting ==
There are several methods of accounting which aim to address the issue of sustainability. These are: large and eclectic dashboards; composite indices; indices focusing on overconsumption; adjusted economic indicators.

=== Large and eclectic dashboards ===
These dashboards bring together a number of indicators that are directly and indirectly related to the durability of socio-economic progress. One example of this is the Eurostat Sustainable Development Indicators, which is a list of over 100 indicators used to monitor the EU Sustainable Development Strategy. The criticism associated with these dashboards is that a large number of indicators risks muddling a clear message about sustainability that resonates with policy makers or citizens. In response, there has been a greater tendency to select headline indicators that "track central elements of green growth and [are] representative of a broader set of green growth issues."

=== Composite indices ===
Composite indices normalize and aggregate various data into a single number, such as the Human Development Index, Osberg and Sharpe's Index of Economic Well-Being, the Changing Wealth of Nations, or the Environmental Sustainability Index, which ranks countries based on an assessment of 76 variables covering five domains. It is often instructive to examine the separate dimensions of these indices. However, they may present a skewed view of countries' contributions to environmental problems and make problematic, normative assumptions about the values of certain variables.

=== Adjusted GDPs ===
Adjusted gross domestic product, or green GDP, systematically corrects conventional GDP by taking into account aspects of a country's production of goods and services (e.g. environmental degradation and natural resource depletion) that would not otherwise be included in the indicator, but are relevant to sustainability.

=== Indices focusing on overconsumption ===
Indicators that fall in this category conceive of sustainability with respect to consumption levels and investment in natural resources. Examples include adjusted net savings (ANS) and ecological footprint accounts. ANS is calculated as the change in total wealth over a given time period, while ecological footprint assessments determine how much of the regenerative capacity of the biosphere is required to maintain the consumption habits of a defined population. The explicit emphasis on sustainability makes these indices useful; however computing them by country fails to capture the global nature of sustainability.

=== Monetary or physical indicators ===
All sustainability indicators can be grouped broadly into two types. Specifically, they will be calculated in monetary terms, using one or more valuation techniques, or in physical terms. It is more likely for monetary indicators to be expressed as flows, and physical indicators as stocks.

== Global initiatives ==
General commitment by the international community to support the development of natural capital accounting was motivated early on by the Brundtland Report in 1987 and the 1992 Rio Summit. At the Summit in particular, Agenda 21 – in which Chapter 40 called for signatories to develop quantitative information regarding their activities – was adopted.

=== System of environmental-economic accounting ===
In September 1992, the Commission on the Environment of the Organization of American States (OAS) Permanent Council held a Seminar on Natural Resource and Environmental Accounts for Development Policy. Many of the country participants expressed interest in developing accounting capacities for natural resources. A proposal was made at that time to create a program to coordinate and strengthen the efforts of countries and institutions undertaking such initiatives.

The development of the first System of Integrated Environmental and Economic Accounting (SEEA) in 1993 (SEEA-1993) was a major step towards establishing standards around integrating the environment into national accounts, and subsequently, environmentally-adjusting or "greening" macroeconomic indicators such as GDP. While the SEEA-2003 and subsequent revisions being undertaken for 2013 have expanded the range of analyses within the framework, the purpose of the SEEA has remained the same. It is an accounting framework that records the stocks and flows that are relevant to both the environment and the economy. Its Central Framework comprises three main accounts that can be integrated with the existing United Nations System of National Accounts (SNA), and each focuses on a different aspect of the interaction between the economy and the environment: physical flow accounts; functional accounts for environmental transactions; and asset accounts in physical and monetary terms.

The latest version of the SEEA (Q3, 2012) has two other parts, aside from the Central Framework: SEEA Experimental Ecosystem Accounts and SEEA Extensions. The Experimental Ecosystem Accounts, specifically, introduces an accounting framework for ecosystems, despite the fact that many of its relevant stocks and flows are centered on non-market assets. While some of the measurement concepts involved in the accounting process are still evolving, it is possible that the eventual valuation of ecosystems and their depletion could be included in the calculations of environmentally-adjusted macroeconomic indicators. This has implications for future policy, since the emphasis on certain projects or activities undertaken by governments will likely change, depending on how the above-mentioned measurements impact their respective accounts, and subsequent environmental adjustments to certain indicators.

The London Group on Environmental Accounting and the UN Committee of Experts on Environmental-Economic Accounting are two groups, created in 1994 and 2005 respectively, to assist in the development of the SEEA and its implementation. As well, the Working Group on Environmental Auditing, a subgroup of the International Organization of Supreme Audit Institutions, is working to improve auditing standards related to environmental issues.

In March 2021, the United Nations Statistical Commission adopted the SEEA Ecosystem Accounting (SEEA EA) standard at its 52nd session. The SEEA EA is a statistical framework that provides a coherent accounting approach to the measurement of ecosystems. Ecosystem accounts enable the presentation of data and indicators of ecosystem extent, ecosystem condition, and ecosystem services in both physical and monetary terms in a spatially explicit way. Following its adoption, the Statistics Division of the United Nations Department of Economic and Social Affairs (UN DESA) in collaboration with the United Nations Environment Programme (UNEP) and the Basque Centre for Climate Change (BC3) released the ARIES for SEEA Explorer in April 2021, an artificial intelligence-powered tool based on the Artificial Intelligence for Environment and Sustainability (ARIES) platform for rapid, standardized and customizable natural capital accounting. The ARIES for SEEA Explorer was made available on the UN Global Platform in order to accelerate SEEA's implementation worldwide.

In May 2025, Fordham University’s Gabelli School of Business adopted an ecological performance reporting framework developed by the private firm Intrinsic Exchange Group (IEG) to assess the value of natural assets. Based on the System of Integrated Environmental and Economic Accounting framework, this model was developed for use by natural asset companies in consultation with former FASB Chairman Robert Herz, leading accounting firms, and Fordham, in collaboration with IEG. The initiative includes the creation of an independent standards-setting body tasked with developing, maintaining, and overseeing global accounting and reporting standards for natural capital.

=== Wealth Accounting and Valuation of Ecosystem Services Partnership ===
The ability of developing countries to build their natural capital account capacities is being improved significantly through the Wealth Accounting and Valuation of Ecosystem Services Services (WAVES) partnership, by encouraging the development of relevant measurement frameworks. WAVES is global partnership that was inaugurated in October 2010 by World Bank President Robert Zoellick at the Convention on Biological Diversity COP-10 meeting in Japan. It aims to promote sustainable development by encouraging the inclusion of the values and contributions of natural capital in national accounts. Several projects have been initiated in developing countries such as Botswana, Colombia and Madagascar with a view to improving their capacity to implement the SEEA, in collaboration with UNEP, the UNDP, the United Nations Statistical Commission, and the financial support of NGOs and the governments of Australia, Canada, France, Japan, Norway and the United States. The World Bank is now implementing a successor program - Global Program for Sustainability - improving measurement and valuation of natural capital and ecosystem services and supporting integration of natural capital into policy dialogues, economic planning and decision-making.

=== Ecological footprint accounts ===
Alternately, natural capital can also be assessed from a biophysical perspective. Ecological footprint and biocapacity accounts, developed by Mathis Wackernagel and William E. Rees in the early 1990, and since 2003 further developed by Global Footprint Network, compare human demand against what the planet or a region's ecosystems can regenerate. They provide an accounting framework that maps human demand from the point of view of biological capital being the limiting factor to the human enterprise. An overview paper documenting the accounting method of the 2018 edition of the National Footprint Accounts was published by David Lin et al. This approach is complementary with the proposal for nine planetary boundaries within which humans can safely operate, as advanced by Rockström et al. Both approaches emphasize the need to make the human enterprise compatible with one-planet constraints if we are to achieve global sustainability. While planetary boundaries aim to identify trigger points of phase shifts, Ecological Footprint accounting measures demand against regeneration - a threshold that can be exceeded for some time ("overshoot") without a phase shift.

=== Inclusive Wealth Index ===
The UN International Human Dimensions Programme has created an inclusive sustainability indicator, the Inclusive Wealth Index (IWI), which measures the productive bases of an economy: produced, natural and human capital, and based on these three assessments, calculates the trajectory of a country's wealth. The calculation of natural capital in the IWI is based on the shadow value of an economy's natural capital assets.

A similar conceptual direction was taken by the Commission on the Measurement of Economic Performance and Social Progress, under the direction of economists Joseph Stiglitz, Amartya Sen and Jean-Paul Fitoussi, at the behest of former French President Nicolas Sarkozy, in 2008. The authors concluded that a pragmatic measure of sustainability would combine an indicator based on the extended wealth approach, and a small dashboard of physical indicators.

While they have different theoretical underpinnings, what these approaches have in common with each other is a fundamental recognition of the limitations of traditional indicators in measuring economic performance and social progress, and the importance of sustainability in the long-run.

=== Beyond GDP ===
There have been several initiatives organized at the regional level that seek to move away from traditional GDP as the major indicator of wealth and well-being. The first of these is Beyond GDP, an initiative started by the EU in 2007 to develop highly aggregated environmental and social indicators and extend the national accounts to environmental and social issues.

In May 2012, the Summit for Sustainability in Africa was held in Gaborone, Botswana. It also brought together leaders from ten African countries to discuss sustainable development planning, and in particular, to commit to a set of goals on fully accounting for natural capital, and integrating it into national planning, reporting and policies. This commitment took the form of the Gaborone Declaration for Sustainability in Africa

=== Economics of ecosystems and biodiversity ===
Four publications were presented at the CBD COP-10 by The Economics of Ecosystems and Biodiversity (TEEB) initiative: TEEB Ecological and Economic Foundations, TEEB in National and International Policy Making, TEEB in Local and Regional Policy, and TEEB in Business and Enterprise. These, along with an Interim Report released at the CBD COP-9 in Bonn, Germany, represent a comprehensive analysis of the economic value of biodiversity, and the consequences it holds for different levels of public and private policy analysis. TEEB also seeks to systematize the role of corporations, under the TEEB for Business Coalition (2012), by formulating standards and assessing externalities. Since natural capital accounting requires the identification of replenishment activities as well as environmental degradation, the inclusion of corporations into the valuation process is key.

=== Natural Capital Declaration ===
In June 2012, the Rio+20 conference "marked a watershed in the world wide interest on Natural Capital Accounting". The Natural Capital Declaration (NCD), a commitment by CEOs in the financial sector to embed ESG considerations in management and investment activities, was revealed prior to the conference. As well, the World Bank started the WAVES 50:50 Initiative to analyze the progress and next steps required for improving efforts to account for natural capital and enhance countries' sustainable decision-making capabilities. At the time of the conference, 62 countries, 90 corporations, and 17 civil society members had signed on to the campaign.

== Country initiatives ==
Many countries are undertaking projects to develop environmental accounts, to integrate them with national accounts or to create environmentally-adjusted macroeconomic indicators, including Green GDP. Early adopters of integrated environmental-economic accounts include the Netherlands, France, and the Philippines. This section documents the initiatives undertaken by, or concerning the G20 countries.

=== Argentina ===
A team of researchers at the University of Buenos Aires and CONICET organized the ARKLEMS+LAND project. Their research, based on the KLEMS database framework (Capital, Labour, Energy, Material and Service Inputs), measures and analyses the sources of economic growth, productivity and competitiveness in the Argentinian economy. The database includes the contributions of "Natural Resource as Land and Subsoil Assets" services to GDP growth.

Professor George Santopietro, at Radford University in Virginia, examined several alternative methods for estimating resource rent and relatedly, depletion costs of natural capital. The methods he engages with are: net price, El Serafy's depletion cost, sustainable price, transaction value and replacement cost. He derives data from the privatization of Yacimientos Petroliferos Fiscales (YPF), Argentina's state-owned oil enterprise, and using each method, generates estimated resource rent and depletion cost values for Argentina's reserves of petroleum. The results show that the net price and transaction value methods overvalue the resource rent of petroleum reserves. He concludes that rent should be derived using the value of a firm's stock.

=== Australia ===
Several Australian organisations produce national environmental accounts. The Australian Bureau of Statistics (ABS) produces Water Account Australia and a pilot Land Account for the Great Barrier Reef, both of which are based on the SEEA framework. The Bureau of Meteorology produces a complementary National Water Account on the water available to be used. The Department of Climate Change, Energy, the Environment and Water reports on greenhouse gas (GHG) emissions. The Wentworth Group of Concerned Scientists has created a trial, environmental accounting model that can be applied to regions of any size. These regional accounts use a common unit of measurement, which allows comparisons to be made between different natural capital assets. The Victorian Department of Sustainability and Environment has developed experimental ecosystem accounts.

The energy and water accounts found on the National Balance Sheet are produced annually. As well, subsoil assets, timber for producing logs, and land are valued monetarily, and included on the non-produced assets in the National Balance Sheet. The ABS is currently working with several other national departments on the National Plan for Environmental Information (NPEI), the State of the Environment Report, and planning for national environmental accounts.

In 2012, following the adoption of the SEEA as an international statistical standard, the ABS also published a report titled "Completing the Picture – Environmental Accounting in Practice," which develops a number of accounting tables rooted in SEEA formatting, and explores how these could influence policy decisions.

=== Britain ===
The UK produces Environmental Accounts, consistent with the SEEA framework, that are separated into three dimensions: natural resource accounts, physical flows and monetary accounts. The majority of the data is measured in physical units; monetary units are used where relevant, and if the necessary data is available.

The current environmental asset accounts produced by the Office for National Statistics (ONS) are: oil and gas reserves, forestry and land cover. In 2012, the ONS planned to run a study on producing a full ecosystem account, with high priority on physical and monetary forestry accounts. The Office also set out a series of goals to include land use and cover accounts in the 2013 Environmental Accounts.

The UK National Ecosystem Assessment (NEA) was a two-year initiative from 2009 to 2011 that assessed the benefits of the natural environment to society and the economy.

The Government has pledged to develop full UK Environmental Accounts by 2020. This work is being led by the ONS and the Department for Environment, Food and Rural Affairs (Defra). The UK Natural Capital Committee was providing advice to help inform this project. In December 2012, the ONS published a 'roadmap' that set out the work-plan for the project. The incorporation of natural capital into the national accounts, if done properly, would enable a high level picture to be obtained of trends in the state of the nation's natural assets through time. This in turn would help demonstrate the implications of actions impacting on the natural environment and may, therefore, encourage policy-makers to ensure natural assets are in future used sustainably through the appropriate use of policy levers.

The Natural Capital Committee was also developing a methodology for corporate natural capital accounting. It was undertaking a pilot project throughout 2014 with a range of organisations to test and refine this methodology and is encouraging organisations that own or manage land to develop corporate natural capital accounts.

=== Brazil ===
Despite reports that Brazil would produce a Green GDP in the lead-up to the Rio+20, there is no indication that this process was undertaken.

=== Canada ===
Beginning in the early 1990s, Statistics Canada developed the Canadian System of Environmental and Resource Accounts (CSERA). The CSERA has three dimensions: Natural Resource Stock Accounts; Material and Energy Flow Accounts; and Environmental Protection Expenditure Accounts. The Natural Resource Stock Accounts are measured in physical and monetary units. These, in turn, comprise natural resource wealth estimates that are included on the National Balance Sheet Accounts. It also includes estimates of land in the "tangible non-produced assets" section of the Canadian balance sheet. The CSERA was developed in line with the SEEA. It did not redefine or supplement existing national accounts aggregates with environmental information to produce measures such as green GDP, although the produced accounts provide "some information for those who may wish to calculate such 'green aggregates.'"

The CSERA is now named the Canadian System of Environmental-Economic Accounts (CSEEA). It continues to include Natural Resource Asset Accounts linked to the National Balance Sheets; Physical Flow Accounts for energy use, water use and greenhouse gas emissions, as well as plastic materials; and Environmental Activity Accounts. In addition, new Ecosystem Accounts have been developed following the SEEA EA (2021). Ecosystem Accounts are produced under the umbrella of the Census of Environment. Statistics Canada's natural capital accounting data are also included in the Quality of Life Hub under the Natural capital indicator.

In 2005, the Pembina Institute published a report on the Canada Boreal Initiative, which sought to quantify the full economic value of goods and services provided by Canada's Boreal region. The Boreal Ecosystem Wealth Accounting System (BEWAS) was constructed for this purpose. It considered the physical conditions in the boreal region by using physical inventory and spatial data. The two-year study approximated the market value, for 2002, of the region's forestry, mining, oil and gas, and hydroelectric generation sectors at $48.9 billion. For the same time period, it also estimated the net market value of natural capital extraction at $37.8 billion and the non-market value of ecosystem services at $93.2 billion.

Professor Nancy Olewiler, at Simon Fraser University, conducted several case studies to value natural capital in settled areas of Canada. Her agricultural lands case studies found the total net value of conservation efforts to be approximately $195/ha/yr in the Ontario Grand River Watershed, $65/ha/yr in the Upper Assiniboine River Basin and $126/ha/yr in the Prince Edward Island Mill River Watershed.

=== China ===
In 1997, Beijing authorities carried out a project assessing the city's Green GDP. This set a series of precedents for environmentally adjusted indicators in the country. Over the next decade, several regional pilot projects were undertaken by local authorities. Between 2001 and 2004, Chinese authorities worked with Statistics Norway to carry out a Green GDP assessment of Chongqing.

Then, in 2004, the Green GDP Accounting Research Project was launched by the State Environmental Protection Administration of China (SEPA) and the National Bureau of Statistics (NBS). The findings, released in the China Green National Accounting Study Report 2004 in 2006, reported that environmental pollution cost the economy 511.8 billion yuan or 3.5% of GDP in 2004. A breakdown of the figure shows that water pollution, air pollution, and solid waste and accidents cost 286.28 billion yuan, 219.8 billion yuan, and 5.74 billion yuan, respectively. According to the report, only about ten of the items the project intended to distinguish were accounted for. The costs of resource depletion and ecological damage were not included in the calculations because of methodological difficulties, limited technological capabilities and a lack of relevant data.

At the same time as the report was released, SEPA Vice Minister Zhu Guangya issued an independent report stating that each year, environmental damage in the country cost approximately 10% of GDP. This estimate was consistent with the one that scientists, economists and the World Bank had expected, of 8-12% of GDP.

The government withdrew its official support for Green GDP in 2007, after early results showed the reduction of growth rates in some provinces to nearly zero. It also did not release an official Green GDP report for 2005, which had been scheduled for publication in March 2007.

Reports have periodically surfaced about re-calculating China's green GDP. In 2007, the All-China Environment Federation (ACEF) called on the National Development and Reform Commission (NDRC) to carry out a national accounting system. China Daily reported that the Ministry of Environmental Protection valued the cost of pollution to the economy at 1.4 trillion yuan in 2009.

Starting in 1998, the NBS developed rudimentary environmental accounts in forestry and energy. Since then, the NBS has expanded its environmental accounts to include pollution treatment, water, and minerals, along with the development of a comprehensive SEEA for China.

=== European Union ===
The interaction between Eurostat and national statistical offices of EU Member States was formalized in 2011, by the adoption of Regulation No 691 on European Environmental Economic Accounts. It requires Member States to report data and accounts on air emissions, taxes related to the environment, and material flows from 2012. Eurostat is also constructing environmental accounts expressed in physical and monetary terms, and asset accounts, as a step towards developing a regional SEEA.

The creation of inclusive wealth indicators is also a recognized priority of the EU. The proposed 7th Environment Action Programme (EAP) of the EC explicitly identifies this issue, by calling for further development and integration of economic and environmental indicators. The Shared Environmental Information System (SEIS) proposes to streamline the collection of data required for designing environmental indicators. The EU also committed to the Aichi Accord at the CBD COP-10, in which Parties agree to integrate biodiversity into their national accounts. This is on top of the experimental ecosystem accounting framework that was launched in 2009. The European Environment Agency (EEA) proposed that given the compatibility of the design with the SNA, it would be possible to use one particular indicator, Consumption of Ecosystem Capital (CEC) to adjust National Accounts aggregates to create, in particular, CEC Adjusted Net Domestic Product and CEC Adjusted Net National Income.

The EC Communication Roadmap to a Resource Efficient Europe sets 2020 as the year by which businesses, along with public authorities, will properly account for natural capital and ecosystem services.

=== France ===
The French Ministry of Sustainable Development produces satellite, environmental-economic accounts each year. However, it is planning on fully expanding the accounts to correspond with the SEEA (2012). The National Institute of Statistics and Economics also includes estimates of land, subsoil assets, and non-cultivated bio and water resources in the "tangible non-produced assets" section of the French balance sheet.

From 2008 to 2010, an exploratory study on ecosystem valuation was carried out. In accordance with the adoption of the Aichi Accord at the CBD COP-10, the French National Biodiversity Strategy Target 7 was set to "include preservation of biodiversity in economic decisions." The Ministry of Sustainable Development is presently consulting with stakeholders and refining methodological options in order to begin assembling physical ecosystem assessments. Annual expert workshops on monetary valuation and economic instruments are also organized by the Ministry.

=== Germany ===
The German Environmental Economic Accounts (GEEA) follow the SEEA framework. The data from these accounts, along with the German Socio-economic Accounts, is used to calculate an indicator set, as outlined in the National Strategy for Sustainable Development (2002). While no adjusted macroeconomic aggregates are estimated in the GEEA, two of the GEEA indicators are embedded into the National Accounts: productivity of energy and raw materials, and transport intensity and share of the railways in providing transport.

=== India ===
An Expert Group, led by IHDP Scientific Committee chairman Professor Partha Dasgupta, is in the process of developing a system to "green" India's national accounts. It plans to adjust GDP to account for environmental costs and impacts by 2015. Some of the issues the Group will address include establishing coordination mechanisms within the country and with international partners, and standardizing data collection and valuation methodologies.

The Green Accounting for Indian States Project (GAISP) was the first initiative of the Green Indian States Trust (GIST), an NGO started in 2004. The Project used data from Indian national databases to measure sustainable development and create green accounts at the state-level that were consistent with SEEA-2003 guidelines. Following this, GIST calculated a Green GDP total which adjusted the traditional indicator for "all major externalities."

The South Asian Network for Development and Environmental Economics (SANDEE) and the Indian Society for Ecological Economics operate in India, although SANDEE is based in Nepal. Both are networks that conduct research on and analyses of environmental accounting, which is instructive for teachers, researchers and members of the policy community.

=== Indonesia ===
Members of the World Resources Institute, led by David Repetto, integrated environmental effects into Indonesia's national accounts in 1990. He subtracted net natural resource depreciation for the petroleum, timber, and soils sectors from GDP to estimate the environmentally-adjusted NDP. They found that estimates of net income and growth of net income were overstated when calculated using the conventional accounts.

In 1997, the United Nations University-Institute of Advanced Studies (UNU-IAS) measured the environmental impacts of industrialization and trade in Indonesia (along with China and Japan). In their study, the UNU-IAS constructed an international environmental input-output model for the Asia Pacific region, and from this, was able to compile a preliminary SEEA and Green GDP approximation. In 1990, environmental costs were equal to 4.9% of NDP for Indonesia. In particular, changes in land use and oil exploitation were major costs.

Since 2002, Statistics Indonesia (BPS) has produced several Indicators of Sustainable Development reports, based on the 134 UN Commission on Sustainable Development Indicators developed by the UN Department of Economic and Social Affairs. BPS also regularly generates environmental statistics and statistics of marine and coastal resources.

=== Italy ===
The Italian National Institute of Statistics (ISTAT) currently constructs three types of environmental accounting modules: material flows (MFA), the environmental account matrix integrated with national economic account (NAMEA), and the expenditure estimate for environmental protection (SERIEE-EPEA).

In 1999, Silvia Teizzi at the University of Sienna applied a method of monetary valuation to externalities arising from agricultural production in Italy. She separately estimated a shadow price and a quantity for the externalities and calculated their values between for each year between 1961 and 1991. She subtracted these figures from the value added of the agricultural sector "as a first step towards the correction of national accounting aggregates to take environmental degradation into account."

In their case study on Trento, Italy, Professors Andrea Francesconi and Paolo Penasa analyze the accounting schemes for environmental expenditures developed by local governments in Italy. Under the local Agenda 21 process, the City and Local Environmental Accounting and Reporting (CLEAR) project and the CONTAROMA project were undertaken by Italian municipalities. The CLEAR project was started in 2001 to pair the financial statements of municipalities with an environmental report. The CLEAR method reclassified the aforementioned financial statements such that expenditures for environmental purposes could be identified, and compiled into separate monetary accounts. Similarly, the CONTAROMA project developed an environmental accounting system for the municipal budget of Rome.

=== Japan ===
In 1995, the Japanese Economic Planning Agency made initial estimates of the SEEA and Green GDP from 1985 to 1990. In 1998, they extended their estimates from 1970 to 1995. According to these calculations, environmental costs in Japan fell from 8% of NDP in 1970 to nearly 1% in 1995.

The E-10 are the official economic-environmental accounts produced by the Japanese Ministry of the Environment. They are based on data compiled by 10 government ministries, and describe the environmental burden of particular natural resources in physical units. There are three tables which make up the E-10: a Basic Transaction Table; resource and environmental burden tables; and supplementary tables.

The Statistics Bureau of Japan currently includes estimates of land in the "tangible non-produced assets" section of the Japanese balance sheet.

=== Republic of Korea ===
In 2001, the Korean Ministry of the Environment planned to introduce an environmentally-adjusted GDP indicator. It began developing a SEEA (KORSEEA) in 2002, and the development of Economy-wide Material Flow Accounts, and NAMEA took place in the following years. Several government institutions and departments provide economic and environmental data required for the KORSEEA. Statistics Korea also includes estimates of land, subsoil assets, and non-cultivated bio and water resources in the "tangible non-produced assets" section of the Korean balance sheet.

The Korea Rural Economic Institute calculated the Green GDP of the Korean agricultural sector in the period 1980 to 1997 using pilot economic-environmental accounts. Environmental adjustment in this study is limited to the subtraction of "degradation costs of natural resources" from NDP. They report that the ratio of environmentally adjusted domestic product to NDP decreases from 100.6% to 99.5% in the agricultural sector during the specified period.

=== Mexico ===
In 1985, the UN, World Bank and Mexican government executed a joint pilot project using 1985 data to produce two environmentally-adjusted indicators: resource depletion subtracted from NDP and environmental degradation subtracted from NDP.

The Mexican System of Economic and Ecological Accounts (MSEEA) was started in 1988, and has been published annually since 1991. The National Institute of Statistics and Geography of Mexico (INEGI) have used the accounts to derive key information about environmental sustainability in the country. Yearly environmental costs are equal to 8.5% of GDP. Since 2003, the INEGI has calculated a yearly Green GDP aggregate. Between 2003 and 2009, the ratio of Green GDP to GDP increased from 90.4% to 92.1%. The INEGI reports that while the scope of action should be increased, this trend reflects the successful efforts of the government to reduce impacts that negatively affect the environment.

=== Russia ===
The Federal State Statistics Service (Rosstat) currently includes estimates of land and non-cultivated bio and water resources in the "tangible non-produced assets" section of the Russian balance sheet. Rosstat has outlined a series of priorities for developing a Russian SEEA. Its highest priority is asset accounts, and with respect to the environment, a particular record of environmental protection expenditures. After 2015, the basis for integration will appear with the creation of input-output tables. Physical flow accounts are a medium priority; further development will depend on the completion of the input-output tables and whether new surveys are introduced on time. While accounts for extended SNA aggregates, such as the depletion or degradation of natural capital are being given conceptual consideration, they are the lowest priority of Rosstat.

=== Saudi Arabia ===
Saudi Arabia has not undertaken any relevant initiatives.

=== South Africa ===
Statistics South Africa (Stats SA), which is South Africa's national statistical office, has been involved in Natural Capital Accounting (NCA) since the late 1990s, and published South Africa's first water accounts in 2000. Subsequently, Stats SA has published mineral, energy and fisheries accounts under the Environmental Economic Accounts Compendium reports. More recently, since 2015, South Africa has undertaken ecosystem accounting. Ecosystem accounting is a relatively new area of work within NCA, and South Africa is at the forefront globally in this area of work.

Ecosystem accounts produced to date in South Africa have been supported by donor funded projects that have added to the capacity available in Stats SA's Environmental-Economic Accounts Directorate. Stats SA has partnered with the South African National Biodiversity Institute (SANBI), and worked in collaboration with the Department of Forestry, Fisheries and the Environment (DFFE) and a range of other national and sub-national institutions to produce a range of ecosystem accounts.

South Africa was one of seven pilot countries involved in a global initiative called Advancing Natural Capital Accounting (ANCA), through which SANBI and Stats SA led the development of the National river ecosystem accounts and the Land and ecosystem accounting in KwaZulu‐Natal.

This was followed by the Natural Capital Accounting and Valuation of Ecosystem Services (NCAVES) Project (2017–2020), in which SANBI and Stats SA, together with DFFE, developed the Land and Terrestrial Ecosystem Accounts, 1990 to 2014, which was released in the first issue of Stats SA's Natural Capital series. Upcoming natural capital accounts to be released in the Natural Capital series include thematic accounts for protected areas, accounts for rhinoceros and cycad species, updated national water accounts to name a few.

Ecosystem accounts use the South African National Ecosystem Classification System (SA-NECS) as the classification system for ecosystem types. Stats SA has developed a Standard with experts from SANBI to essentially standardize the use of the SA-NECS as the approved in Feb 2021. The Standard is applicable to national accounts, environmental economic accounts produced by Stats SA, and any other institution doing accounts.

Stats SA has published a ten-year strategy for advancing NCA in South Africa. The purpose of the strategy is to focus the efforts of Stats SA, and other institutions on developing priority natural capital accounts to inform South Africa's sustainable development policy objectives. The National NCA Strategy aims to ensure that NCA is widely used to provide credible evidence for integrated planning and decision-making in support of the development needs of the country. The vision is supported by five strategic goals.

There is a growing community of practice for natural capital accounting in South Africa, and South Africa is an active participant in the Africa NCA community of practice.

=== Turkey ===
The Turkish Statistical Institute produces a range of environmental statistics.

=== United States ===
In 1992, the Bureau of Economic Analysis within the Department of Commerce began intensively developing environmental accounting methodologies. However, Congress directed the department to suspend all activities in this area in 1994, after the first U.S. Integrated Environmental and Economic Satellite Accounts were published. It also ordered an external review of environmental accounting. This review, Nature's Numbers: Expanding the National Economic Accounts to Include the Environment was concluded in 1999.

William Nordhaus (Nature's Numbers), along with Nicholas Muller and Robert Mendelsohn, co-authored a study on integrating environmental externalities into a SNA. Their model estimates gross damages from air pollution in each industry in the United States. It estimates that damages from activities such as combustion of waste, sewage treatment and firing power plants by oil or coal are larger than their value added. The largest externalities, for which damages range from 0.8 to 5.6 times value added, arise from coal-fired electric generation.

== See also ==
- Calculation in kind
- Ecological economics
- Economic value
