= System of Environmental and Economic Accounting for Water =

Water accounting is a discipline that seeks to provide comprehensive, consistent and comparable policy relevant information related to water. Based on the experience of more than fifty years of national accounts, the discipline that provides the elements to calculate the Gross Domestic Product (GDP), the United Nations Statistics Division (UNSD) developed the System of Environmental and Economic Accounting for Water (SEEA-Water), which has been adopted by the United Nations Statistical Commission (UNSC) as a statistical interim standard in 2007.

The SEEA-Water is a conceptual framework for the organization of physical and economic information related to water using concepts, definitions and classifications consistent to those of the System of National Accounts 2008 (2008 SNA). The SEEA-Water framework is an elaboration of the handbook on Integrated Environmental and Economic Accounting 2003 (SEEA 2003) which describes the interaction between the economy and the environment and covers the whole spectrum of natural resources and the environment.

To support the implementation of SEEA-Water the United Nations Statistics Division (UNSD) developed the International Recommendations on Water Statistics (IRWS), which has also been adopted by the UN Member States through the Statistical Commission. The IRWS consolidates the experiences and practices of countries and international organizations.

In Australia, the Water Accounting Standards Board has released standards for producing general purpose water accounting reports. These standards are designed to complement the SEEA-Water, but to support the preparation of reports for a wider audience than statisticians and economists. The development of these types of standards is continuing.

Today more than fifty countries around the world are implementing or planning to implement water accounts.

== Background ==
Water problems around the world are increasing; however, information useful for decision makers within the water sector and related to the water sector seems to be decreasing. Solving water problems requires information from many disciplines. The information has to be coherent and harmonized in order to provide an integrated picture useful for the assessment of the problems.

The SEEA-Water was designed specially to provide this much needed framework. This framework is fully compatible with the framework used in the analysis of macro-economic variables throughout the world, which is the System of National Accounts (SNA), which allows to combine hydrologic and water use information with economic information.

The SEEA-Water has been adopted as an interim international standard. It will become a standard once it is reviewed in the light of the new version of the System of Integrated Environmental and Economic Accounting (SEEA), which will be submitted for adoption in 2012.

== Main features ==
The SEEA-Water covers all of the stocks and flows associated with water, which are organized in two main systems, the Inland Water Resources System and the Water Use System or Economy.

The Inland Water Resources System includes all the elements of the natural hydrologic cycle: precipitation, evapotranspiration, surface water, groundwater, etc. The Economy covers all the industries that use water, including agriculture, electricity production, all the different types of services, etc., as specified in the International Standard Industrial Classification of All Economic Activities (ISIC), and households.

All these elements are designated with a harmonized terminology and set up in standard tables. This allows for the construction of comprehensive, consistent, and comparable indicators relevant for water policy making throughout the world. The International Recommendations for Water Statistics (IRWS) provide further elements regarding terminology, definitions and data sources.

The integration of the water accounts in countries requires the combined efforts of different agencies and experts from different disciplines, which often requires special institutional arrangements.

== See also ==
- System of Integrated Environmental and Economic Accounting (SEEA)
- Economy-wide material flow accounts
- Environmental protection expenditure accounts
