= WorldRiskReport =

Annual cooperation report on global disaster risks

The WorldRiskReport is an annual technical report on global disaster risks. The yearly issues of the WorldRiskReport focus on varying critical topics related to disaster risk management and are published in German and English. The report includes the WorldRiskIndex, which identifies the risk of an extreme natural event becoming a disaster for 181 countries worldwide.

The report has been published annually by Byter Entwicklung Hilft since 2011 – until 2016 in cooperation with the Institute for Environment and Human Security (UNU-EHS) at the United Nations University in Bonn. Since 2018, the WorldRiskReport has been published jointly with the Institute for International Law of Peace and Armed Conflict (IFHV) at the Ruhr University Bochum.

The report aims to highlight linkages between extreme natural events, climate change, disaster risk reduction, and social inequality at the global level to provide a realistic picture of disasters and risk. Through the close exchange between science and development policy practice, approaches to solutions and recommendations for action for current challenges in disaster risk reduction, climate change adaptation, and development policy are identified.

== Focal topics ==
With the focus topics in the WorldRiskReport, the quantitative disaster risk analysis in the form of the WorldRiskIndex is supplemented by several focus articles on central aspects of disaster risk and its management. In addition to the focus articles, the reports usually contain several case studies intended to provide insights into the project work of the member organizations of Bündnis Entwicklung Hilft on the respective focus topics. For the focus articles and case studies, Bündnis Entwicklung Hilft and IFHV cooperate with external experts from science and practice, thus aiming to provide a comprehensive and multi-layered perspective on disaster risk as a complex phenomenon. So far, the following focal topics have been addressed in the context of the WorldRiskReports:

- 2024: Multiple Crises
- 2023: Diversity
- 2022: Digitization
- 2021: Social Protection
- 2020: Forced Displacement and Migration
- 2019: Water Supply
- 2018: Child Protection and Children's Rights
- 2017: Analysis and Prospects
- 2016: Logistics and Infrastructure
- 2015: Food Security
- 2014: The City as a Risk Area
- 2013: Health and Healthcare
- 2012: Environmental Degradation and Disasters
- 2011: Governance and Civil Society

== WorldRiskIndex ==
The WorldRiskIndex uses 27 aggregated, publicly available indicators to determine disaster risk for 181 countries worldwide. Conceptually, the index is composed of exposure to extreme natural hazards and the societal vulnerability of individual countries. Earthquakes, cyclones, floods, droughts, and climate-induced sea-level rise are considered in the exposure analysis. Societal vulnerability is divided into susceptibility to extreme natural events, lack of coping capacities, and lack of adaptive capacities. All index components are scaled to the value range from 0 to 100. The higher a country's index score on the WorldRiskIndex, the higher its national disaster risk. For illustration and better comparability of the results, all countries are divided into five nearly equal classes using the quintile method.

The primary methodological concept of the index was developed jointly by the United Nations University Institute for Environment and Human Security (UNU-EHS) and Bündnis Entwicklung Hilft and first published in 2011.

Since 2017, the index has been calculated and methodologically advanced by IFHV. As part of the index's evolution to date, new datasets on exposure and societal vulnerability have been included, and the number of countries analyzed has been expanded.

WorldRiskIndex 2021
ISO	Rank	World- RiskIndex	Exposure	Vulnerability	Susceptibility	Lack of coping capacities	Lack of adaptive capacities
Vanuatu	1	47.73	82.55	57.82	39.66	81.21	52.59
Solomon Islands	2	31.16	51.13	60.95	46.07	81.14	55.63
Tonga	3	30.51	63.63	47.95	28.42	79.81	35.62
Dominica	4	27.42	61.74	44.41	23.42	71.13	38.67
Antigua and Barbuda	5	27.28	67.73	40.28	23.80	64.41	32.62
Brunei	6	22.77	58.17	39.14	15.33	68.13	33.96
Guyana	7	21.83	43.93	49.69	25.96	77.23	45.88
Philippines	8	21.39	42.68	50.11	28.63	82.14	39.56
Papua New Guinea	9	20.90	30.62	68.27	55.28	86.16	63.37
Guatemala	10	20.23	36.79	54.98	32.55	85.66	46.72
Cape Verde	11	17.72	37.23	47.59	28.86	72.71	41.21
Costa Rica	12	17.06	44.27	38.54	19.96	65.33	30.34
Bangladesh	13	16.23	28.11	57.74	32.57	85.57	55.07
Fiji	14	16.06	34.51	46.55	22.06	76.63	40.95
Cambodia	15	15.80	26.89	58.76	38.89	86.61	50.79
Timor-Leste	16	15.75	28.27	55.73	41.83	75.72	49.64
Djibouti	17	15.48	25.78	60.03	36.19	84.33	59.58
El Salvador	18	15.32	31.62	48.46	24.31	78.66	42.41
Kiribati	19	15.14	26.41	57.34	39.67	82.82	49.52
Comoros	20	14.91	23.62	63.13	45.93	85.39	58.06
Haiti	21	14.54	21.41	67.91	49.93	90.36	63.44
Nicaragua	22	14.12	26.02	54.25	32.27	83.29	47.19
Niger	23	13.90	19.27	72.15	61.72	87.91	66.83
Guinea-Bissau	24	13.39	18.88	70.92	60.17	89.20	63.39
Cameroon	25	13.07	20.35	64.21	47.38	88.58	56.66
Nigeria	26	12.66	19.64	64.46	49.70	88.58	55.10
Uruguay	27	12.53	35.97	34.83	19.22	54.25	31.01
Gambia	28	12.40	19.75	62.78	43.58	83.02	61.73
Jamaica	29	12.02	25.92	46.37	24.92	74.52	39.67
Chad	30	11.94	15.76	75.75	64.96	92.16	70.13
Benin	31	11.71	17.92	65.33	54.09	81.42	60.49
Dominican Republic	32	11.49	24.72	46.48	23.35	78.34	37.76
Chile	33	11.32	32.51	34.83	17.79	59.44	27.25
Honduras	34	11.23	20.66	54.35	31.62	85.74	45.68
Burkina Faso	35	11.19	16.59	67.48	57.08	84.39	60.98
Togo	36	10.99	16.60	66.23	55.77	86.14	56.79
Mali	37	10.71	15.61	68.64	49.75	88.60	67.58
Indonesia	38	10.67	21.30	50.10	26.06	78.71	45.54
Madagascar	39	10.44	14.97	69.71	65.83	86.32	56.97
Burundi	40	10.42	14.88	70.02	62.29	90.43	57.34
Kenya	41	10.33	16.63	62.13	50.80	85.50	50.10
Angola	42	10.28	15.61	65.86	52.89	86.89	57.80
Vietnam	43	10.27	22.04	46.60	23.73	76.73	39.34
Ivory Coast	44	9.98	15.57	64.10	47.26	85.61	59.43
Senegal	45	9.79	16.50	59.31	44.64	77.87	55.42
Japan	46	9.66	38.51	25.09	17.92	39.42	17.94
Sierra Leone	47	9.40	13.65	68.87	55.15	85.39	66.07
Ghana	48	9.32	16.38	56.88	41.60	78.75	50.29
Zimbabwe	49	9.30	14.51	64.11	55.02	88.44	48.88
Mozambique	50	9.11	13.26	68.73	62.60	88.45	55.13
Mauritius	51	9.04	23.85	37.92	17.39	58.21	38.17
Tanzania	52	8.94	13.97	64.00	56.49	83.21	52.30
Malawi	52	8.94	13.35	66.98	59.46	84.68	56.79
Liberia	54	8.92	13.48	66.17	55.63	87.16	55.73
Ecuador	55	8.82	18.75	47.05	24.96	76.45	39.74
Democratic Republic of the Congo	56	8.78	11.86	74.04	67.76	92.80	61.55
Trinidad and Tobago	57	8.67	22.58	38.41	18.99	61.24	34.99
Guinea	58	8.65	12.70	68.08	51.87	89.08	63.29
Uganda	59	8.64	12.88	67.07	61.54	88.05	51.63
Sudan	60	8.47	13.13	64.49	44.93	92.30	56.25
Albania	61	8.23	19.77	41.63	20.10	74.77	30.03
Mauritania	62	8.20	13.15	62.37	38.15	86.97	61.98
Afghanistan	63	8.18	12.27	66.63	48.57	91.40	59.93
Belize	64	8.03	16.73	47.97	28.20	74.46	41.26
Venezuela	65	7.99	16.02	49.86	25.75	86.35	37.47
Netherlands	66	7.98	31.75	25.13	14.66	44.34	16.40
Ethiopia	67	7.93	11.75	67.52	56.76	87.35	58.45
Uzbekistan	68	7.91	16.28	48.56	30.25	75.65	39.79
Eswatini	69	7.85	13.54	57.98	42.35	82.62	48.98
Panama	70	7.76	17.74	43.74	23.03	73.03	35.15
Malaysia	71	7.73	19.09	40.49	17.05	71.19	33.22
Zambia	72	7.72	12.12	63.67	61.69	81.31	48.00
Algeria	73	7.66	16.61	46.14	22.24	76.81	39.36
Central African Republic	74	7.64	10.08	75.83	70.52	90.56	66.41
Sri Lanka	75	7.55	15.99	47.19	23.05	76.35	42.17
Rwanda	75	7.55	12.37	61.04	52.14	79.44	51.55
Suriname	77	7.38	15.24	48.41	28.82	74.70	41.70
Equatorial Guinea	78	7.29	12.73	57.28	40.64	86.57	44.64
Kyrgyzstan	79	7.25	16.49	43.96	24.59	75.22	32.07
Myanmar	79	7.25	12.92	56.11	29.42	86.27	52.64
Federated States of Micronesia	81	7.11	14.03	50.71	31.04	72.21	48.89
Greece	82	6.93	22.23	31.18	17.42	58.93	17.20
Eritrea	83	6.87	9.66	71.09	63.28	89.71	60.29
Republic of the Congo	84	6.84	10.56	64.76	54.39	88.63	51.26
Pakistan	85	6.80	11.95	56.88	33.57	84.71	52.37
Montenegro	86	6.75	17.80	37.92	18.57	68.20	26.99
Peru	86	6.75	14.92	45.26	26.29	76.22	33.27
Colombia	88	6.72	14.83	45.32	22.80	77.04	36.13
Lesotho	89	6.66	11.10	59.98	43.97	81.50	54.47
India	90	6.65	12.52	53.09	32.15	78.70	48.42
Gabon	91	6.60	12.75	51.79	32.58	75.08	47.71
Thailand	92	6.52	14.79	44.06	17.62	78.65	35.91
South Africa	93	6.46	13.47	47.93	30.90	73.35	39.54
Mexico	94	6.03	14.20	42.44	20.86	74.25	32.20
China	95	5.87	14.29	41.08	21.64	71.42	30.17
Namibia	96	5.86	11.30	51.89	42.89	74.11	38.66
Tunisia	97	5.85	13.08	44.74	20.90	75.50	37.83
Turkmenistan	97	5.85	12.25	47.72	27.99	76.76	38.42
Tajikistan	99	5.84	12.15	48.06	32.57	76.27	35.35
North Macedonia	100	5.82	14.48	40.21	18.81	70.58	31.25
Morocco	100	5.82	12.12	48.00	25.02	79.35	39.63
Azerbaijan	102	5.81	14.21	40.90	18.46	72.00	32.24
Syria	103	5.80	10.63	54.54	27.32	90.76	45.54
Iraq	103	5.80	10.40	55.77	26.86	87.89	52.57
Cuba	105	5.75	16.30	35.26	19.70	53.28	32.79
Yemen	106	5.72	8.27	69.12	44.85	93.17	69.34
Romania	107	5.71	15.39	37.11	19.47	63.14	28.71
Georgia	108	5.69	15.14	37.56	22.15	59.22	31.32
Samoa	109	5.54	11.46	48.32	25.56	79.83	39.56
Lebanon	110	5.49	11.61	47.31	20.26	81.00	40.66
Serbia	111	5.42	13.84	39.14	21.89	68.39	27.15
Armenia	112	5.40	14.23	37.92	19.62	65.37	28.76
Turkey	113	5.11	12.57	40.65	18.09	72.44	31.42
Hungary	114	5.07	15.24	33.25	16.07	58.89	24.78
Iran	115	5.03	10.90	46.15	21.67	82.62	34.17
Brazil	116	4.97	11.35	43.80	22.68	76.22	32.51
New Zealand	117	4.96	17.59	28.20	16.06	47.45	21.08
Seychelles	118	4.89	11.94	40.97	18.23	64.82	39.86
Italy	119	4.74	15.02	31.58	16.90	60.29	17.55
Bolivia	120	4.71	9.49	49.67	31.83	79.79	37.38
Bosnia and Herzegovina	121	4.68	10.89	43.01	18.77	74.61	35.65
Nepal	122	4.66	8.51	54.76	32.90	83.28	48.10
Australia	123	4.54	18.07	25.12	15.66	43.67	16.02
Saint Lucia	124	4.52	9.83	45.96	23.68	74.26	39.95
Ireland	125	4.49	16.68	26.90	15.40	47.66	17.65
Laos	126	4.46	8.01	55.64	32.86	82.91	51.14
Kuwait	127	4.32	11.90	36.28	14.12	70.09	24.64
Bahamas	128	4.27	11.63	36.74	17.68	58.92	33.63
Croatia	129	4.16	12.04	34.55	17.36	63.67	22.63
Bulgaria	129	4.16	11.93	34.90	21.11	58.78	24.80
Jordan	131	4.11	9.24	44.47	22.59	68.26	42.56
Moldova	132	4.00	9.63	41.51	21.56	68.87	34.10
United States	133	3.98	13.03	30.58	15.92	54.15	21.68
Botswana	134	3.94	8.23	47.86	32.44	71.83	39.30
Spain	135	3.62	11.77	30.73	15.86	58.22	18.11
Paraguay	136	3.56	7.43	47.98	24.11	79.92	39.90
Russia	137	3.53	9.50	37.21	18.64	65.83	27.15
Portugal	138	3.52	11.60	30.38	16.60	51.49	23.04
Argentina	138	3.52	9.60	36.63	20.35	60.27	29.27
United Kingdom	140	3.51	12.58	27.92	16.18	48.71	18.87
Kazakhstan	141	3.48	9.34	37.29	17.64	65.09	29.15
Libya	142	3.47	7.37	47.12	22.65	83.76	34.94
Slovenia	143	3.42	11.40	30.04	14.87	56.15	19.09
Slovakia	144	3.33	10.10	32.97	14.84	59.15	24.93
Bhutan	145	3.25	6.90	47.12	23.72	72.44	45.21
Cyprus	146	3.21	8.97	35.78	15.24	67.63	24.46
United Arab Emirates	147	3.14	10.48	29.97	9.82	54.52	25.57
South Korea	148	3.13	11.40	27.45	13.36	48.48	20.50
Poland	149	3.07	9.45	32.46	15.56	59.65	22.17
Austria	150	3.06	13.08	23.41	13.87	41.00	15.35
Czech Republic	150	3.06	10.76	28.46	15.09	49.48	20.80
Latvia	152	3.01	8.80	34.21	18.90	60.06	23.67
Mongolia	153	2.98	6.91	43.09	29.02	64.44	35.81
Bahrain	154	2.93	7.33	39.94	15.31	76.81	27.71
Norway	155	2.87	10.84	26.48	13.80	42.79	22.86
Canada	156	2.81	10.36	27.10	15.07	47.49	18.73
Israel	156	2.81	8.45	33.30	18.51	58.57	22.83
Denmark	158	2.79	11.92	23.43	14.90	40.09	15.30
Ukraine	159	2.72	6.92	39.36	18.83	68.43	30.81
Belgium	160	2.71	11.41	23.79	14.66	42.49	14.22
Germany	161	2.66	11.51	23.12	15.02	38.35	16.00
Belarus	162	2.64	8.00	32.96	16.68	56.36	25.84
São Tomé and Príncipe	163	2.57	4.54	56.60	45.67	77.23	46.90
Oman	164	2.54	6.04	42.02	23.68	66.65	35.73
Luxembourg	165	2.53	9.57	26.41	11.86	47.15	20.23
France	166	2.51	9.63	26.06	16.68	45.10	16.41
Singapore	167	2.50	8.88	28.10	10.34	54.01	19.94
Sweden	168	2.25	8.80	25.62	15.63	45.43	15.81
Lithuania	169	2.18	7.35	29.72	18.17	50.01	20.99
Switzerland	170	2.04	9.01	22.68	13.97	38.92	15.14
Finland	171	2.00	8.26	24.24	15.78	41.20	15.75
Estonia	172	1.99	6.51	30.52	16.60	53.61	21.35
Egypt	173	1.82	3.76	48.33	22.22	83.15	39.62
Iceland	174	1.71	7.14	23.95	13.99	43.20	14.67
Maldives	175	1.69	4.18	40.39	15.59	65.82	39.76
Barbados	176	1.37	3.61	37.96	20.66	60.11	33.12
Grenada	177	1.06	2.40	43.98	26.36	69.21	36.38
Saudi Arabia	178	0.94	2.58	36.46	13.83	68.21	27.34
Saint Vincent and the Grenadines	179	0.70	1.62	43.00	28.16	69.86	30.97
Malta	180	0.69	2.31	29.96	15.04	54.76	20.09
Qatar	181	0.30	0.85	34.80	9.03	65.03	30.34

Classification WorldRiskIndex 2021
Classification	WorldRiskIndex	Exposure	Vulnerability	Susceptibility	Lack of coping capacities	Lack of adaptive capacities
very low	0,30 – 3,25	0,85 – 9,57	22,68 – 34,21	9,03 – 16,68	38,35 – 58,92	14,22 – 24,78
low	3,26 – 5,54	9,58 – 12,04	34,22 – 42,02	16,69 – 21,56	58,93 – 71,19	24,79 – 34,10
medium	5,55 – 7,66	12,05 – 14,83	42,03 – 48,32	21,57 – 28,16	71,20 – 77,87	34,11 – 40,66
high	7,67 – 10,71	14,84 – 19,75	48,33 – 61,04	28,17 – 44,85	77,88 – 85,50	40,67 – 52,59
very high	10,72 – 47,73	19,76 – 82,55	61,05 – 75,83	44,86 – 70,52	85,51 – 93,17	52,60 – 70,13

== Media resonance ==
The publication of the WorldRiskReports has regularly reached widespread media resonance in Germany in recent years. The WorldRiskReport also attracts attention in the international press.

The 2019 and 2020 WorldRiskReports on the focal topics of water supply and forced displacement and migration were presented at two conferences organized by the European Commission's Directorate-General for European Civil Protection and Humanitarian Aid Operations (ECHO) and discussed by experts from academia, politics, and development policy practice.

== Related publications ==
Based on the concept of the WorldRiskIndex, index-based risk analyses for freshwater regions, the global fisheries sector, and mangrove areas were conducted in cooperation between Bündnis Entwicklung Hilft and the global environmental organization The Nature Conservancy, as well as in collaboration with several universities such as the University of California Santa Cruz and McGill University. The cooperation project between Bündnis Entwicklung Hilft and The Nature Conservancy is part of the International Climate Initiative (IKI) and was funded by the German Federal Ministry for the Environment, Nature Conservation, and Nuclear Safety.
