= Global Hunger Index =

Tool that measures and tracks hunger

Global hunger index

The Global Hunger Index (GHI) is a tool used to measure and track hunger at the global, regional, and national levels. The report, published annually in October, describes the prevalence of hunger and undernutrition in individual countries and gauges both progress and setbacks in the global fight against hunger. GHI scores can be used to rank countries, and current results can be compared with past outcomes. An interactive map enables users to visualize data across different years and zoom into specific regions or countries.

The index was originally developed by the International Food Policy Research Institute (IFPRI) in cooperation with Welthungerhilfe, a German aid organization, and was first published in 2006. In 2007, the Irish non-governmental organization (NGO) Concern Worldwide joined as a co-publisher. In 2018, IFPRI handed the project over to its longstanding partners Welthungerhilfe and Concern Worldwide, who have continued the GHI as a joint initiative ever since. In 2024, the Institute for International Law of Peace and Armed Conflict (IFHV) joined the project as an academic partner.

== History ==
The 21st Global Hunger Index (GHI) is being released amidst intensifying food crises. After almost two decades of significant progress, the global hunger situation has deteriorated again compared to 2018. Currently, around 645 million people worldwide suffer from hunger. At the current pace, 57 countries will fail to achieve the goal of low hunger levels by 2030. This stagnation reflects the impact of mutually reinforcing crises. Violent conflicts and insecurity remain among the main drivers of hunger and malnutrition, jeopardizing decades of progress in the fight against hunger.

The 2026 Global Hunger Index also reveals that most countries with a serious or alarming GHI score are simultaneously heavily affected by the impacts of these crises. In many places, conflicts also hinder data collection, while declining funding makes tracking hunger generally more difficult. The experiences of the past two decades have shown that combining knowledge with political will and decisive action can certainly enable progress overcoming hunger.

In previous years, topics included:

- 2010: Early childhood undernutrition among children younger than the age of two.
- 2011: Rising and more volatile food prices of the recent years and the effects these changes have on hunger and malnutrition.
- 2012: Achieving food security and sustainable use of natural resources, when the natural sources of food become increasingly scarce.
- 2013: Strengthening community resilience against undernutrition and malnutrition.
- 2014: Hidden hunger, a form of undernutrition characterized by micronutrient deficiencies.
- 2015: Armed conflict and its relation to hunger.
- 2016: Reaching the UN Sustainable Development Goal of zero hunger by 2030.
- 2017: The challenges of inequality and hunger.
- 2018: Forced migration and hunger.
- 2019: Climate change and hunger.
- 2020: "One decade to Zero Hunger: Linking health and sustainable food systems".
- 2021: Hunger and Food Systems in Conflict Settings.
- 2022: Food Systems Transformation and Local Governance.
- 2023: The Power of Youth in Shaping Food Systems.
- 2024: How Gender Justice can advance Climate Resilience and Zero Hunger
- 2025: 20 Years of tracking Progress: Time to recommit to Zero Hunger
- 2026: No Security Without Food Security

In addition to the yearly GHI, the Hunger Index for the States of India (ISHI) was published in 2008 and the Sub-National Hunger Index for Ethiopia was published in 2009.

An interactive map allows users to visualize the data for different years and zoom into specific regions or countries.

== Calculation of GHI scores ==
GHI scores
Level	Value
Low	≤ 9.9
Moderate	10.0-19.9
Serious	20.0-34.9
Alarming	35.0-49.9
Extremely alarming	≥ 50.0

Based on the values of the four indicators, a GHI score is calculated on a 100-point scale reflecting the severity of hunger, where 0 is the best possible score (no hunger) and 100 is the worst. Each country's GHI score is classified by severity, from low to extremely alarming.

The GHI combines 4 component indicators:

- Undernourishment: the share of the population with insufficient caloric intake.
- Child stunting: the share of children under age five who have low height for their age, reflecting chronic undernutrition.
- Child wasting: the share of children under age five who have low weight for their height, reflecting acute undernutrition.
- Child mortality: the share of children who die before their fifth birthday, partly reflecting the fatal mix of inadequate nutrition and unhealthy environments.

In 2026, data were assessed for the 136 countries that met the criteria for inclusion in the GHI, and GHI scores were calculated for 122 of those countries based on data from 2000 to 2025. The data used to calculate GHI scores come from published United Nations sources (Food and Agriculture Organization of the United Nations, World Health Organization, UNICEF, and Inter-agency Group for Child Mortality Estimation), the World Bank, and Demographic and Health Surveys.

For 14 countries, individual scores could not be calculated, and ranks could not be determined owing to a lack of data. Eight countries were provisionally designated by severity based on other published data. For the remaining 6 countries, data were insufficient to allow for either calculating GHI scores or assigning provisional categories.

== Regional and national trends ==
The 2026 GHI report finds that hunger is most severe in the regions of Africa South of the Sahara and South Asia, where hunger remains serious. Africa South of the Sahara’s high GHI score is driven by the highest undernourishment and child mortality rates of any region by far. In South Asia, serious hunger is driven by rising undernourishment and persistently high child undernutrition.

Hunger is designated as moderate in West Asia and North Africa with its GHI score rising again. Hunger is categorized as low in Latin America and the Caribbean, East and Southeast Asia, and Europe and Central Asia. According to the 2026 GHI scores and provisional designations, hunger is considered alarming in 8 countries (Burundi, Chad, Dem. Rep. Of Congo, Madagascar, Somalia, Sudan, South Sudan, and Yemen) and serious in 36 countries.

Many countries are slipping backward: 32 Countries now face higher hunger levels than in 2018. In 20 countries with moderate, serious, or alarming 2026 GHI scores, progress has largely stalled and their 2026 GHI scores have declined by less than 5 percent from their 2018 GHI scores.

A small number of countries—including Nepal, Rwanda, Togo, Uganda and Venezuela—have made significant improvements in their GHI scores, even if hunger in these countries remains too high.

=== Country rankings ===
Country rankings as per the Global Hunger Index.

Legend

Countries where hunger is low (GHI ≤9.9)
Countries where hunger is moderate (GHI = 10.0–19.9)
Countries where hunger is serious (GHI = 20.0–34.9)
Countries where hunger is alarming (GHI = 35.0–49.9)
Countries where hunger is extremely alarming (GHI ≥50.0)

Rank in 2026	Country	2000	2006	2012	2018	2026	Absolute change since 2018	Percent change since 2018
1-24 (Note: The 24 countries with 2026 GHI scores of less than 5 are not assigned individual ranks, but rather are collectively ranked 1-24. Differences between their scores are minimal.)	Armenia	20.3	14.4	7.8	6.2	<5	—	—
1-24	Belarus	<5	<5	<5	<5	<5	—	—
1-24	Bosnia and Herzegovina	9.5	6.3	<5	<5	<5	—	—
1-24	Bulgaria	8.7	8.5	7.5	5.8	<5	—	—
1-24	Chile	<5	<5	<5	<5	<5	—	—
1-24	China	13.8	9.1	<5	<5	<5	—	—
1-24	Costa Rica	5.8	<5	<5	<5	<5	—	—
1-24	Croatia	7.4	<5	<5	<5	<5	—	—
1-24	Estonia	<5	<5	<5	<5	<5	—	—
1-24	Georgia	11.7	9.2	7.1	<5	<5	—	—
1-24	Hungary	<5	<5	<5	<5	<5	—	—
1-24	Kuwait	<5	<5	<5	<5	<5	—	—
1-24	Latvia	5.4	<5	<5	<5	<5	—	—
1-24	Lithuania	5.5	<5	<5	<5	<5	—	—
1-24	Montenegro	—	6.5	<5	<5	<5	—	—
1-24	North Macedonia	7.4	6.9	<5	<5	<5	—	—
1-24	Paraguay	12.8	9.7	6.9	<5	<5	—	—
1-24	Romania	8.1	6.4	<5	<5	<5	—	—
1-24	Russia	10.5	6.7	<5	<5	<5	—	—
1-24	Serbia	—	5.9	<5	<5	<5	—	—
1-24	Turkey	22.1	11.6	5.4	<5	<5	—	—
1-24	United Arab Emirates	4.7	5.2	5.2	<5	<5	—	—
1-24	Uruguay	7.9	5.7	<5	<5	<5	—	—
1-24	Uzbekistan	25.6	15.4	8.5	5.2	<5	—	—
25	Moldova	18.3	18.9	6.4	5.4	5.0	-0.4	-7.4
26	Mongolia	29.5	21.2	11.1	6.7	5.3	-1.4	-20.9
27	Argentina	6.5	5.4	5.4	5.5	5.5	0.0	0.0
27	Brazil	11.7	7.0	5.5	5.7	5.5	-0.2	-3.5
29	Azerbaijan	25.3	15.5	10.6	7.1	5.5	-1.6	-22.5
30	Dominican Republic	15.2	14.3	11.0	8.3	5.9	-2.4	-28.9
31	Kazakhstan	11.9	13.0	8.8	6.1	6.0	-0.1	-1.6
31	Tunisia	9.0	8.1	6.8	5.9	▲6.0	0.1	1.7
33	Colombia	10.7	11.2	8.7	6.7	6.1	-0.6	-9.0
33	Saudi Arabia	10.5	12.5	8.1	6.3	6.1	-0.2	-3.2
34	Mexico	9.7	9.4	7.4	6.8	6.2	-0.6	-8.8
34	Peru	21.1	15.6	9.5	7.2	6.5	-0.7	-9.7
37	Guyana	17.0	15.8	14.0	10.2	6.8	-3.4	-33.3
38	Cape Verde	16.0	13.2	12.2	8.4	6.9	-1.5	-17.9
39	El Salvador	13.6	12.2	10.0	7.2	7.0	-0.2	-2.8
40	Albania	15.2	15.7	9.5	6.2	▲7.1	0.9	14.5
41	Iran	12.4	9.8	9.1	8.3	7.2	-1.1	-13.3
41	Panama	17.3	13.4	10.3	8.1	7.2	-0.9	-11.1
43	Algeria	14.1	11.9	9.1	7.1	▲7.5	0.4	5.6
43	Jamaica	8.3	8.4	8.3	7.8	7.8	0.0	0.0
45	Kyrgyzstan	18.5	14.0	10.7	8.2	7.9	-0.3	-3.7
46	Venezuela	14.3	11.0	7.1	16.7	8.9	-7.8	-46.7
47	Morocco	15.7	16.4	9.4	8.2	▲9.0	0.8	9.8
48	Jordan	10.2	7.6	8.5	9.5	9.4	-0.1	-1.1
48	Lebanon	11.0	11.4	7.0	7.2	▲9.4	2.2	30.6
48	Turkmenistan	19.8	15.3	11.7	9.9	9.4	-0.5	-5.1
*	Slovakia	—	—	—	—	9.9	—	—
51	Thailand	17.2	12.5	12.2	11.4	10.0	-1.4	-12.3
51	Fiji	9.2	9.5	10.4	9.6	▲10.0	0.4	4.2
53	Sri Lanka	22.1	19.9	20.8	11.4	10.2	-1.2	-10.5
54	Ecuador	19.1	16.4	12.3	11.6	10.3	-1.3	-11.2
55	Trinidad and Tobago	11.2	11.6	10.3	9.1	▲10.5	1.4	15.4
55	Egypt	16.5	14.6	16.0	11.6	10.5	-1.1	-9.5
57	Oman	16.2	12.0	10.7	11.8	10.8	-1.0	-8.5
58	Vietnam	24.2	22.1	15.6	12.9	11.2	-1.7	-13.2
59	Suriname	14.8	11.0	10.5	10.8	▲11.4	0.6	5.6
60	Ukraine	12.8	10.8	9.7	9.8	▲11.6	1.8	18.4
61	Iraq	22.9	20.1	17.2	13.5	11.9	-1.6	-11.9
62	Honduras	21.7	17.6	13.5	12.9	12.3	-0.6	-4.7
63	Tajikistan	39.2	31.8	24.2	14.9	12.7	-2.2	-14.8
64	Libya	11.9	14.6	17.0	12.9	12.9	0.0	0.0
65	Ghana	29.0	22.1	17.7	15.5	13.0	-2.5	-16.1
66	Mauritius	15.1	13.8	13.3	12.5	▲13.2	0.7	5.6
67	Philippines	23.9	22.2	20.1	15.3	13.5	-1.8	-11.8
68	Malaysia	15.1	13.9	12.8	12.3	▲13.6	1.3	10.6
69	Bolivia	26.6	23.0	16.2	12.2	▲14.2	2.0	16.4
70	Cambodia	39.8	26.8	21.3	15.2	14.3	-0.9	-5.9
71	Indonesia	25.0	28.8	22.5	17.0	14.4	-2.6	-15.3
72	Nepal	37.0	30.8	24.4	18.4	14.5	-3.9	-21.2
72	Myanmar	41.4	29.8	20.3	16.2	14.5	-1.7	-10.5
74	South Africa	16.7	17.8	13.2	13.1	▲15.4	2.3	17.6
74	Senegal	32.5	23.6	19.5	16.2	15.4	-0.8	-4.9
76	Eswatini	24.3	25.7	22.8	17.6	16.1	-1.5	-8.5
77	Cameroon	36.8	29.4	22.2	19.4	16.9	-2.5	-12.9
78	Comoros	35.7	27.7	25.1	19.0	17.6	-1.4	-7.4
78	Togo	37.4	29.4	25.9	24.3	17.6	-6.7	-27.6
80	Gabon	19.8	19.4	16.3	16.5	▲18.0	1.5	9.1
81	Guatemala	29.0	24.9	21.5	19.8	18.3	-1.5	-7.6
82	Gambia	29.4	25.1	21.0	19.3	18.4	-0.9	-4.7
83	Botswana	29.8	27.8	23.3	21.1	18.7	-2.4	-11.4
84	Bangladesh	34.6	30.0	27.3	20.0	19.2	-0.8	-4.0
*	Nicaragua	21.3	17.2	14.3	12.1	10–19.9*	-2.1	-17.4
85	Laos	43.8	29.5	21.5	20.1	20.0	-0.1	-0.5
86	Ivory Coast	32.8	34.1	26.4	21.0	20.2	-0.8	-3.8
87	Tanzania	40.3	31.8	26.8	23.9	20.4	-3.5	-14.6
88	Mali	40.6	36.0	27.1	22.4	20.5	-1.9	-8.5
88	Uganda	35.8	30.5	25.1	28.7	20.7	-8.0	-27.9
90	Mauritania	31.3	25.3	20.1	19.3	▲20.8	1.5	7.8
91	Republic of the Congo	35.3	31.8	29.0	24.9	20.9	-4.0	-16.1
92	Rwanda	49.6	35.7	27.0	26.7	21.0	-5.7	-21.3
93	Burkina Faso	44.3	36.4	30.3	25.1	22.1	-3.0	-12.0
94	Guinea	36.9	34.2	28.6	26.7	22.3	-4.4	-16.5
94	Zimbabwe	35.6	32.5	27.8	25.9	22.3	-3.6	-13.9
96	Djibouti	41.4	35.3	28.1	22.7	22.5	-0.2	-0.9
97	Namibia	26.6	26.5	24.2	21.7	▲22.9	1.2	5.5
98	Solomon Islands	18.7	18.5	21.7	21.2	▲23.4	2.2	10.4
99	Guinea-Bissau	37.7	29.8	28.3	23.1	▲23.9	0.8	3.5
100	Ethiopia	53.0	42.3	31.2	24.9	24.1	-0.8	-3.2
101	Benin	32.1	27.3	24.6	24.0	▲24.3	0.3	1.3
101	Angola	61.7	39.1	23.2	24.0	▲24.3	0.3	1.3
103	India	38.1	37.0	28.8	25.8	24.8	-1.0	-3.9
103	Malawi	43.1	32.7	24.9	21.9	▲24.9	3.0	13.7
103	Kenya	35.6	29.8	23.4	23.4	▲25.0	1.6	6.8
106	Pakistan	36.2	32.9	31.6	24.0	▲25.5	1.5	6.2
107	Mozambique	46.9	36.3	30.8	31.6	25.9	-5.7	-18.0
108	Afghanistan	49.8	38.1	31.5	28.4	▲28.6	0.2	0.7
109	Sierra Leone	57.7	47.2	33.8	32.3	28.7	-3.6	-11.1
110	Zambia	51.1	43.8	36.8	28.7	▲30.7	2.0	7.0
111	Papua New Guinea	31.4	30.8	36.4	31.4	▲31.5	0.1	0.3
112	Syria	14.8	17.1	19.2	28.0	▲31.5	3.5	12.5
113	Liberia	48.0	40.8	36.0	32.4	32.3	-0.1	-0.3
114	Timor-Leste	—	44.1	30.0	27.3	▲32.5	5.2	19.0
115	Central African Republic	46.8	44.4	37.1	34.5	33.1	-1.4	-4.1
116	Niger	52.7	40.9	38.1	34.4	34.1	-0.3	-0.9
117	Nigeria	37.3	32.5	31.0	28.2	▲34.3	6.1	21.6
118	Haiti	40.1	39.3	31.7	30.4	▲34.4	4.0	13.2
*	North Korea	43.8	32.6	29.0	27.4	20–34.9*	-7.4	-27.0
*	Lesotho	—	—	—	—	20–34.9*	—	—
119	Madagascar	41.9	39.2	33.6	35.7	▲36.5	0.8	2.2
120	Chad	49.5	46.2	41.0	38.5	38.0	-0.5	-1.3
121	Democratic Republic of the Congo	48.5	39.3	37.3	36.6	▲39.5	2.9	7.9
122	Somalia	64.4	60.8	59.6	51.1	47.0	-4.1	-8.0
*	Sudan	—	—	—	26.0	▲35.0	9.0	34.6
*	Burundi South Sudan Yemen	—	—	—	—	35–49.9*	—	—
For the 2026 GHI report, data were assessed for the countries available in the 2026 ranking sheet. If "—" sign is shown, data are not available or not presented. Some countries did not exist in their present borders in the given year or reference period.

== See also ==
- List of countries by percentage of population living in poverty

== Literature ==
- 2026 – No Security Without Food Security
- 2025 – 20 Years Of Tracking Progress: Time to recommit to Zero Hunger
- 2024 – Gender Justice, Climate Resilience and Food and Nutrition Security
- 2023 – The Power of Youth in Shaping Food Systems
- 2022 – Food Systems Transformation and Local Governance
- 2021 – Hunger and Food Systems in Conflict Settings
- 2020 – One Decade to Zero Hunger - Linking Health and Sustainable Food Systems
- 2019 – The Challenge of Hunger and Climate Change
- 2018 – Forced Migration and Hunger
- 2017 – The Inequalities of Hunger
- 2016 – Getting to Zero Hunger
- 2015 – Armed Conflict and the Challenge of Hunger
- 2014 – The Challenge of Hidden Hunger
- 2013 – The Challenge of Hunger: Building Resilience to achieve Food and Nutrition Security
- 2012 – The Challenge of Hunger: Ensuring Sustainable Food Security Under Land, Water, and Energy Stresses
- 2011 – The Challenge of Hunger: Taming Price Spikes and Excessive Food Price Volatility
- 2010 – The Challenge of Hunger: Focus on the Crisis of Child Undernutrition
- 2009 – The Challenge of Hunger: Focus on Financial Crisis and Gender Inequality
- 2008 – The Challenge of Hunger 2008
- 2007 – The Challenge of Hunger 2007
- 2006 – The Challenge of Hunger 2006
