= System of Integrated Environmental and Economic Accounting =

Environmental framework

System of Environmental-Economic Accounting (SEEA) is a framework to compile statistics linking environmental statistics to economic statistics. SEEA is described as a satellite system to the United Nations's System of National Accounts (SNA). This means that the definitions, guidelines and practical approaches of the SNA are applied to the SEEA. This system enables environmental statistics to be compared to economic statistics as the system boundaries are the same after some processing of the input statistics. By analysing statistics on the economy and the environment at the same time it is possible to show different patterns of sustainability for production and consumption. It can also show the economic consequences of maintaining a certain environmental standard.

== Scope ==
The SEEA is a satellite system of the SNA that consists of several sets of accounts. In broad terms, the area can be described as enabling any user of statistics to compare environmental issues to general economics, knowing that the comparisons are based on the same entities, for example, pollution levels caused by a producing industry can be linked to the specific economics of that industry.

The different areas of SEEA can be briefly described as follows:

=== Flows of materials and energy ===
By this is meant flows of materials and energy through the economy, e.g., fuels, natural resources and chemicals, together with their emissions, may it be air emissions, water pollution or waste to which these flows give rise. Data on emissions, above all to the air, have been published for many countries, in particular, European countries following SEEA. The main difference between traditional emissions statistics and emissions in environmental accounts are related to the system boundaries. For example, the inventories produced for the reporting of air emissions to the United Nations Framework Convention on Climate Change (UNFCCC) are based on the geographic borders of a country while the air emission accounts following SEEA use the boundary of a specific economy (this is the "residence principle" of the national accounts). This difference is mainly shown in transport emissions as all emissions caused by an economy are included in SEEA. For example, emissions from trucks, ships or airplanes are allocated to their country of origin, even if the emissions occur outside of the borders of this country. Moreover, in the UNFCCC inventories, "transport" is a specific sector of its own and it is not possible to know the share of households and of different industries in the transport emissions.

Other statistics that have been developed with relation to flows of material are economy-wide material flow accounts and still being developed are energy flow- and water flow accounts.

=== Environmental economic statistics ===
Economic variables that are already included in the national accounts but are of obvious environmental interest, such as investments and expenditure in the area of environmental protection, environment-related taxes and subsidies, and environmental classification of activities and the employment associated with them, etc. In principle, environmental taxes and environmental protection expenditures can be regarded as two sides of the same coin. Both entail costs involved in production processes that are related to the exploitation of the environment in different ways. On the one hand, environmental protection expenditures record spending on measures aimed at improving the environment, while on the other hand, taxes record the costs set by a government for the exploitation of the environment. Thus, in the total cost of production, the environmental taxes paid can be added to expenditure on environmental protection.

=== Stocks of natural resources ===
Natural resources in the sense that the accounts should make it possible to describe stocks and changes in stocks of selected finite or renewable resources. These accounts deal with questions related to the monetary valuation of this natural capital, the physical quantities and qualitative aspects that do not have any market monetary value, e.g., the value of outdoor recreation and biodiversity. Such accounts may be compiled for sub-soil assets (e.g., oil and gas resources), biological resources (e.g., forests, fish stocks), land and ecosystems.

=== Ecosystem accounts ===
The SEEA Ecosystem Accounting (SEEA EA) is a statistical framework that provides a coherent accounting approach to the measurement of ecosystems. Ecosystem accounts enable the presentation of data and indicators of ecosystem extent, ecosystem condition, and ecosystem services in both physical and monetary terms in a spatially explicit way. The United Nations Statistical Commission adopted the SEEA EA standard at its 52nd session in March 2021. Following its adoption, the Statistics Division of the United Nations Department of Economic and Social Affairs (UN DESA) in collaboration with the United Nations Environment Programme (UNEP) and the Basque Centre for Climate Change (BC3) released the ARIES for SEEA Explorer in April 2021, an artificial intelligence-powered tool based on the Artificial Intelligence for Environment and Sustainability (ARIES) platform for rapid, standardized and customizable natural capital accounting. The ARIES for SEEA Explorer was made available on the UN Global Platform in order to accelerate SEEA’s implementation worldwide.

== History ==
In the statistical sphere the development of SEEA was begun in the early 1990s. As with the development of the national accounts, the experts involved came from large international organisations, national statistical offices, researchers from universities and consultants. Experts in economics, environmental issues and statistics have developed the SEEA to a point were statistics can be compiled, analysed and published. In 2012 the United Nations Statistical Commission adopted the SEEA as a statistical standard.

The concept of sustainable development encouraged the development of integrated environmental and economic accounts. The first interim version of the System of Environmental and Economic Accounting was made available in 1993 by the United Nations. According to Joy E. Hecht, PhD, the 1993 handbook did not receive the approval of the United Nations Statistical Commission "...because it did not represent a consensus report but was offered to UN members as a basis for discussion and experimental implementation".

The United Nations Statistical Division carried on working with SEEA through the establishment of a city group called the London Group in 1994 (as the first meeting was held in London). The London Group is still active and is an informal group consisting of experts primarily from national statistical agencies but also international organisations and researchers from universities. In March 2005 the United Nations Statistical Commission established the UN Committee of Experts on Environmental-Economic Accounting (UNCEEA). This group consists of national statistical offices, Eurostat, International Monetary Fund, Organisation for Economic Co-operation and Development, European Environment Agency, several UN divisions such as the United Nations Statistics Division, United Nations Environment Programme, United Nations Economic and Social Commission for Western Asia, United Nations Economic Commission for Latin America and the Caribbean, and World Bank depending on the agenda and availability. The meeting participants are to be directors or similar in rank. This group has e.g. as their purpose to:

1. to mainstream environmental-economic accounting and related statistics
2. to advance the implementation of the SEEA in countries.

Another city group has also worked with SEEA. The so-called Nairobi Group was established in 1995 by the United Nations Environment Programme. The group was to advance international work in the fields of environmental and natural resource accounting and consisted of experts from developing and developed countries, international organisations and non-governmental organisations. With the release of the operational manual on SEEA in 2000 the work of the Nairobi Group has stopped.

European progress in the field has been driven by the European Commission and national statistical offices. In 1994, the European Commission issued a communication for the establishment of green national accounting based on satellites to the System of National Accounts. Eurostat, and the European Statistical Offices used this as a basis for the development and implementation of the different topics and modules described in the SEEA 1993.

In more recent years, in June 2006, the European Council adopted "an ambitious and comprehensive renewed EU Strategy for Sustainable Development". It was then stated that: "For better understanding of interlinkages between the three dimensions of SD [Sustainable Development], the core system of national income accounting could be extended by inter alia integrating stock and flow concepts and non-market work and be further elaborated by satellite accounts, e.g., environmental expenditures, material flows and taking into consideration international best practices." The strategy has since then been revised (in 2009) but the topic remains on the agenda in Europe.

The high level conference "Beyond GDP" in November 2007 at which Commissioner Dimas concluded that "we [The European Commission] will also need to speed up and improve the development of integrated accounting in the social and environmental spheres" increased the interest for SEEA. The idea of Beyond GDP is to increase the use of indicators related to environment and social aspects in relation to indicators such as the gross domestic product (GDP) "...to address global challenges such as climate change, poverty, resource depletion and health" (Beyond GDP web-site). In 2009 the European Commission issued a communication GDP and Beyond: Measuring Progress in a Changing World describing the need to complement economic indicators such as the GDP with social and environmental indicators. According to this communication, the European Commission plans to extend the existing data collection further, ready for policy analysis by 2013.

== Implementation ==
Within the European Statistical System (ESS) as well as in other countries, such as Canada, Australia and New Zealand the further development of SEEA and the implementation of the framework has led to a focus on compiling statistics related to flows of materials (air emission, energy use, waste flows and water flows) rather than analysing stocks of natural resources. One reason is that information from the parts of SEEA related to flows of materials have been in more demand from the user community. Another reason is that it has been possible to develop harmonised approaches on which sound statistical practises could be implemented in relation to environmental economic statistics. (The ESS "...is the partnership between the Community statistical authority, which is the Commission (Eurostat), and the national statistical institutes (NSIs) and other national authorities responsible in each Member State for the development, production and dissemination of European statistics.")

European statistical offices and Eurostat are following a European Strategy for Environmental Accounts. As part of the strategy, a legal base was proposed for the collection of data on Environmental Accounts.

The legal base was passed in 2011 and extended in 2014 The legal base contain six modules that countries within the European Economic Area needs to conform to. These modules are air emission accounts, environmental taxes by industry, economy-wide material flow accounts, environmental protection expenditure accounts, environmental goods and services sector, and physical energy flow accounts.

In May 2025, Fordham University’s Gabelli School of Business licensed the ecological performance reporting framework developed by a private company, Intrinsic Exchange Group, for valuing natural assets. The accounting and reporting framework, which is based on the System of Integrated Environmental and Economic Accounting framework, was developed for natural asset companies in consultation with former FASB Chairman Robert Herz, accounting firms and Fordham, in partnership with IEG. The framework is establishing a new, independent standards-setting body to develop, maintain and oversee global accounting and reporting standards for natural capital.

== See also ==
=== SEEA modules ===
- Economy-wide material flow accounts
- Environmental protection expenditure accounts
- System of Environmental and Economic Accounting for Water

=== Other related articles ===
- Ecometrics
- Green accounting
- Input–output model
- United Nations System of National Accounts
