= International Recommendations on Water Statistics =

The International Recommendations for Water Statistics (IRWS) is a statistical intermediate output framework developed by the United Nations Statistics Division (UNSD) and approved by the United Nations Statistical Commission (UNSC) that was designed for guiding countries in the development of their water information systems to design and evaluate policies for better water management.

The IRWS are aligned with the United Nations Water Accounts (SEEA-Water), a statistical output framework.

The IRWS consolidates the experiences and practices of countries and international organisations in the field of water statistics, and were developed in collaboration and consultations with many country and international experts.

The IRWS is divided into two main parts followed by annexes. The first part contains the international recommendations with the main concepts, definitions, classifications of statistical units and data items. The second part provides guidance for implementation, covering data sources, data quality, data collection strategies and dissemination. The annexes provide reference information as well as indicators.
