= Institute for International Law of Peace and Armed Conflict =

The Institute for International Law of Peace and Armed Conflict (IFHV) at Ruhr University Bochum (Germany) is one of the leading research institutes on humanitarian law and humanitarian studies in Europe.

It was founded in 1988 on the initiative of Prof. Dr. Dr. h.c. mult. Knut Ipsen, then rector of Ruhr University Bochum, as a means to conduct research on international conflicts and provide solutions to resolve them. The IFHV’s research is highly interdisciplinary with a focus on international humanitarian studies from a legal and social-scientific perspective.

The Institute also provides high-level academic and professional training for the next generation of personnel in the area of humanitarian action. The IFHV’s interdisciplinary angle is put into practice through its Joint Master’s Programme in International Humanitarian Action, part of the European University Network on Humanitarian Assistance (NOHA).

Since 2014, the Institute is headed by Prof. Dr. Pierre Thielbörger, M.PP. (Harvard). Its staff consists of about 25 employees (including student research assistants) and about 10 PhD students.

Current professors involved in the Institute’s work are:

- Prof. Dr. Horst Fischer (IFHV)
- Prof. Dr. Hans-Joachim Heintze (IFHV)
- Prof. Dr. Pierre Thielbörger, M.PP. (Harvard) (IFHV & Faculty of Law; Managing Director)
- Prof. Dr. Markus Kaltenborn (Faculty of Law)
- Prof. Dr. Adelheid Puttler, LL.M. (Chicago) (Faculty of Law)
- Prof. Dr. Ludger Pries (Faculty of Social Science)
- Prof. Dr. Stefan Wohnlich (Faculty of Geosciences)
- Prof. Dr. Michael Wilhelm (Faculty of Medicine)

== Research ==
The Institute’s research programme is based on four pillars:

1. Extensive research projects, often leading to major academic publications
2. Research seminars, conferences and summer schools
3. Postdoctoral research
4. Doctoral research

Some significant current and former research areas include

- questions of international and non-international armed conflicts
- the right to water in relation to armed conflicts
- climate change and humanitarian action
- questions of minority rights and self-determination
- problems of humanitarian operations conducted by international organisations

== NOHA Master ==
The European University Network on Humanitarian Assistance (NOHA) is an international association of universities that aims at enhancing professionalism in the humanitarian sector, by promoting humanitarian values through higher education. Its flagship Joint Master’s Programme in International Humanitarian Action was created in 1993. Its European partner universities are:

- Aix-Marseille University (France)
- Ruhr University Bochum (Germany)
- University College Dublin (Ireland)
- Vilnius University (Lithuania)
- University of Malta (Malta)
- University of Groningen (The Netherlands)
- University of Warsaw (Poland)
- University of Deusto (Spain)
- Uppsala University (Sweden)

The NOHA Master has been awarded the status of an Erasmus Mundus Programme, providing EU-funded scholarships for outstanding third-country nationals. It further enables students and scholars to become part of a global framework for cooperation between the following universities:

- Deakin University (Melbourne, Australia)
- Universidad Javeriana (Bogotá, Colombia)
- Bangalore University (India)
- Gadjah Mada University (Yogyakarta, Indonesia)
- Saint Joseph University (Beirut, Lebanon)
- German Jordanian University (Amman, Jordan)
- Fordham University (New York, United States)

The NOHA Master at the IFHV enjoys broad support by the International Committee of the Red Cross (ICRC) and the German Red Cross in particular, the European Union, the European Inter-University Centre for Human Rights and Democratisation (EIUC) in Venice as well as many other affiliated non-governmental organisations (NGOs) and inter-governmental organisations (IGOs) and the wider international humanitarian community.

== Publications ==
The Institute maintains a significant range of different publication series in international law in order to provide information about long-term subjects as well as contemporary issues.

=== Journal of International Law of Peace and Armed Conflict (JILPAC) ===
The Journal of International Law of Peace and Armed Conflict is the leading German journal for research on international humanitarian law, human rights and peacekeeping law. It is published quarterly by the Institute in cooperation with the German Red Cross.

=== Bochumer Faxe (‘Bofaxe’) ===
Bofaxe deal with current events related to international humanitarian law. Usually making up not more than one page, Bofaxe are an instrument to provide comprised analysis on pressing matters of international concern. They are an opportunity for acclaimed experts as well as younger legal researchers to share their views on events shaping the world.

=== IFHV Working Papers ===
Since 2010, the IFHV and the Ruhr University Bochum regularly release the IFHV Working Papers. It offers researchers the opportunity to bring their academic work on humanitarian issues to the attention of a broader audience.
