= Janelle Knox-Hayes =

American academic studying economic geography

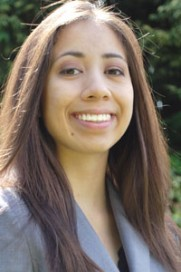
- Born: Cortez, Colorado, United States
- Education: University of Oxford; University of Colorado Boulder
- Known for: Carbon Markets, Environmental finance
- Awards: Boettcher Scholarship, Jack Kent Cooke Graduate Scholarship, Abe Fellowship, Fulbright Scholarship
- Scientific career
- Fields: Economic geography, Environmental finance
- Workplaces: Massachusetts Institute of Technology
- Doctoral advisor: Gordon L. Clark

Janelle Knox-Hayes is a Professor of Economic Geography in the Department of Urban Studies and Planning at the Massachusetts Institute of Technology. Her research and teaching explore the institutional nature of social, economic and environmental systems, and the ways in which these are impacted by changing socio-economic spatial and temporal dynamics.

== Education ==
A native of the Four Corners region of Colorado, Knox-Hayes received her BA (summa cum laude) in International Affairs, Ecology, and Japanese Language and Civilizations from the University of Colorado Boulder in 2004. As an undergraduate, she worked with Professor Alex Cruz on the ethology and reproductive biology of African cichlid and the cuckoo catfish (Synodontis multipunctata). Her research on the subject appeared in the 2004 version of the Encyclopedia of Animal Behavior. Knox-Hayes received her MSc in Nature, Society and Environmental Policy from the University of Oxford. There, she worked with Gordon Clark, then Halford Mackinder Professor of Geography and now Director of the Smith School of Enterprise and the Environment at Oxford University, on the geographic and socio-demographic characteristics of financial literacy and retirement planning. Knox-Hayes stayed at Oxford for her DPhil, continuing to work with Clark but shifting focus to climate change policy, specifically the role of carbon markets and environmental finance.

== Career ==
Before starting graduate school, Knox-Hayes worked as an energy analyst for the United States Government Accountability Office. While in graduate school, she served as the president of Oxford Women in Politics, an organization intended to support and empower women in politics. She also worked as an energy analyst for New Energy Finance. In 2009, Knox-Hayes took up her current position as an assistant professor at the Georgia Institute of Technology. There she has taught a range of courses focused on environmental sustainability, environmental finance, and political economy.

Knox-Hayes is the author of a number of peer-reviewed works falling broadly into three thematic clusters.

The first focuses on the institutional development of environmental markets and includes publications appearing in the Journal of Economic Geography, the Annals of the American Association of Geographers, Competition and Change, Organization and Environment, Regulation and Governance, and Global Environmental Change. This work investigates the political and economic interfaces between financial markets and environmental systems, particularly the political and financial development of carbon emissions markets and other governance mechanisms like carbon disclosure. Topics include the institutional settings and contexts under which markets are developed, the impacts of financial governance on environmental materiality, the nature of coalitions and security in climate policy formation and the changing nature of production systems as spearheaded by carbon markets.

The second includes her book and publications in Transactions of the Institute of British Geographers, Environment and Planning A, and Pensions and investigates how individuals plan for the future under conditions of economic uncertainty as well as the limits to which individual cognition can accommodate temporal scale. These works explore the spatial nature and temporal scale of individual cognition in retirement planning, the effects of demographic factors on planning preparedness, and the impacts of economic uncertainty.

The third concerns the business and organizational implications of tacit knowledge. Knox-Hayes's work on the subject appears in Strategic Organization, and investigates the social and organizational impacts of information liberation and compression. Specifically she is concerned with the nature of spatially and temporally embedded information (through tacit knowledge and culture) and how the liberation of information shapes governance and business operation.

== Awards ==
Knox-Hayes has been the recipient of a number of prestigious awards. In 2000, she was awarded the Boettcher Scholarship, the oldest and most prestigious undergraduate scholarship in the state of Colorado. In 2005 she was the recipient a 6-year graduate scholarship from the Jack Kent Cooke Foundation. Subsequently, she has received funding from the National Science Foundation and Georgia Department of Transportation. From 2012-2013 she held an Abe Fellowship from the Social Science Research Council and in 2014 she was awarded a Fulbright scholarship to study and teach in Iceland

== Bibliography ==
- Saving for Retirement: Intention, Context, and Behavior with Gordon L. Clark and Kendra Strauss (Oxford University Press, 2012)
- Cultures of Markets: The Political Economy of Climate Governance (Oxford University Press, 2016)
