= Green bank =

Financial institution providing funding exclusively for decarbonization projects

A green bank (sometimes referred to as a green investment bank, state investment bank, clean energy finance authority, or clean energy finance corporation) is a financial institution, typically public or quasi-public, that employs innovative financing techniques and market development tools in collaboration with the private sector to expedite the deployment of clean energy technologies. Green banks use public funds to leverage private investment in clean energy technologies that, despite their commercial viability, have struggled to establish a widespread presence in consumer markets. Green banks aim to reduce energy costs for ratepayers, stimulate private sector investment and economic activity, and expedite the transition to a low-carbon economy.

In the United States, green banks have been established at the federal, state, and local levels. The United Kingdom, Australia, Japan, New Zealand, and Malaysia have all established national banks dedicated to leveraging private investment in clean energy technologies. Collectively, green banks around the world have facilitated approximately $30 billion in clean energy investment.

== History ==
In the United States, the green bank concept was originally developed by Reed Hundt and Ken Berlin as part of the 2008 Obama-Biden Transition Team's efforts to facilitate clean energy development. A similar concept was incorporated as an amendment to the federal cap and trade bill, known as the American Clean Energy and Security Act, introduced in May 2009. A companion piece of federal green financing legislation was concurrently introduced in the Senate, where it received broad bipartisan support.

When the 2009 cap and trade legislation ultimately failed to pass the Senate, green bank advocates in the US shifted their focus to the state level. The nonprofit Solar and Energy Loan Fund of St. Lucie County, Inc. (SELF) was the first local government green bank established in America in 2010. Connecticut established the first state green bank in 2011, followed by New York in 2013. By the end of fiscal year 2015, the Connecticut Green Bank had supported $663 million in project investments.

In 2022, Congress passed the Inflation Reduction Act, which established a national green bank intended to fund the existing and future network of green banks in the United States. However, after new President Donald Trump signed the One Big Beautiful Bill Act into law on July 4, 2025, the GGRF's funds were rescinded.

In the UK in 2009, two reports were published advocating the creation of a state-backed infrastructure bank to provide financing for green projects. The first report, titled "Accelerating Green Infrastructure Financing: Outline Proposals for UK Green Bonds and Infrastructure Bank," was published in March 2009 by Climate Change Capital and E3G. The second report, titled "Delivering a 21st Century Infrastructure for Britain," was published by Policy Exchange in September 2009 and was authored by Dieter Helm, James Wardlaw, and Ben Caldecott.

== Essential elements and main functions ==
=== Essential elements ===
There are various types and styles of institutions that finance clean energy and green infrastructure projects. However, several key elements distinguish green banks from other financing institutions: a focus on commercially viable technologies, a dedicated source of capital, an emphasis on leveraging private investment, and a connection with the government.

Green banks prioritize commercially viable technologies rather than early-stage innovative technologies. This focus is due to the tested nature of these technologies, reduced associated "technology risk," and their ability to reliably generate revenue for project owners. Green banks typically operate as public-purpose entities with some form of government relationship and are usually capitalized with public funds. Similar to a commercial bank, green banks provide capital and own debt, necessitating the presence of their own balance sheet. Green banks also concentrate on utilizing their capital to facilitate private entry into the clean energy market, primarily by using limited public funds to leverage private investment in clean energy.

=== Main functions ===
==== Provision of capital for green investments ====
Green banks play a crucial role in providing financial support for projects with substantial upfront costs. They assist in bridging investment gaps, particularly during economic downturns. This role is aligned with the concept that public financing can effectively address structural barriers associated with high capital expenses.

==== Risk reduction ====
Green banks play a critical role in mitigating risks associated with low-carbon projects, rendering them more appealing to private investors. Different green banks employ various de-risking mechanisms, such as concessional finance or guarantees, to achieve this. De-risking not only reduces financing costs but also encourages private investment in more challenging projects.

==== Educational role ====
Green banks fulfill an educational role, both internally and externally. They cultivate in-house expertise to accurately assess risks and standardize de-risking mechanisms. This knowledge is shared within the industry, aiding investors in risk assessment and assisting developers in due diligence, thereby making projects more attractive to potential investors.

==== Signaling role ====
Green banks co-finance projects and build a reputation for expertise. When they choose to invest in a project, it serves as a signal of trustworthiness to other investors. This signaling role attracts additional funding from previously uninterested investors and may even lead to oversubscription and crowding-out of the green bank itself.

==== First (or Early Mover) role ====
Green banks often assume the risk of being the first to invest in innovative or novel projects. By doing so, they demonstrate that these projects can succeed, establishing a track record that encourages private investment in future similar projects, thereby fostering innovation.

== Market barriers ==
For consumers, the high upfront costs often render clean energy technology unattractive to adopt, despite declines in the costs of clean energy technology. Historically, the clean energy sector has relied on taxpayer-funded grants, rebates, tax credits, and other subsidies to drive market development.

Ideally, private lenders would offer financing to building owners to cover the upfront costs of adopting clean energy technologies (beyond what is covered by rebates). However, there are capital market inefficiencies and inherent challenges in financing clean energy that have resulted in insufficient investment by private lenders. While some private lenders do provide financing for clean energy projects, they typically impose relatively high interest rates and offer short loan tenors. These terms make clean energy project financing unattractive from the end-user's perspective. To be appealing to end-users, financing terms should result in monthly cash flow from clean energy projects that exceeds the monthly payments for the cost of financing. Such a cash flow structure is only feasible with loan terms that match the expected lifetime of the project's savings and interest rates that align with the associated risks. Therefore, private capital, if available at unfavorable terms, undermines the economic viability of potential projects for customers or project developers.

A shortage of private financing exists for several reasons. One reason is the relatively short track record for clean energy financing, resulting in limited data for lenders to rely on. Without data and an observable pipeline of similar projects, banks face a high level of uncertainty regarding the performance of various project types and borrower repayment patterns. This uncertainty leads to hesitancy to enter the market, increased due diligence costs, and/or unfavorable lending terms.

Another reason for the financing gap is that many clean energy projects are small and distributed. Investments in building efficiency upgrades and rooftop solar projects are inherently small and geographically dispersed, with varying levels of creditworthiness among the parties involved. The heterogeneity of clean energy projects makes it more expensive for private lenders to underwrite them at scale, potentially rendering loans for clean energy projects uneconomical from the lender's perspective.

A third reason for the financing gap is the lack of liquidity and maturity in the capital market. When a commercial bank provides an energy efficiency loan, it is uncertain whether the bank will be able to sell that loan to another lender or if it will have to retain the loan on its balance sheet. Unlike mortgage and auto lenders, who benefit from highly liquid secondary markets for home and car loans that help keep interest rates low, these types of secondary markets are only just beginning to develop for clean energy technologies.

The final factor contributing to private underinvestment relates to human and organizational behavior. For a bank to enter a new market and begin lending, it must hire new staff, gain expertise in the risks and processes of the new market, and establish precise criteria for the types of projects and credit ratings they are willing to support. This process can be time-consuming.

== Financing activities ==
To address the barriers to clean energy market development, green banks assist consumers in securing long-term, low-interest loans. Green banks employ a diverse range of financing techniques, including credit enhancements, co-investment, and securitization.

=== Credit enhancement ===
Green banks frequently employ credit enhancement mechanisms to leverage private investment. Loan loss reserves, overcollateralization, and subordinated debt can help alleviate concerns among private lenders interested in entering the market but apprehensive about the risks associated with developers, counterparties, or technologies with a less established track record in their respective jurisdictions. Credit enhancements also serve to reduce the cost of capital for borrowers and improve debt ratings from credit agencies.

=== Co-investment ===
At times, green banks directly invest in clean energy projects to facilitate additional private investment or enhance the financial terms established by private lenders.

=== Securitization ===
Securitizing clean energy loans significantly enhances the appeal of lending for private investors. Individual clean energy projects, which exhibit variations in credit quality, location, and technology, can pose a substantial underwriting cost for a bank and may not achieve the desired investment scale. Bundling these loans into portfolios and selling them (or shares of them) disperses risk and creates scale, attracting a broader spectrum of private investors. A green bank can create and securitize loan portfolios, enabling investors to acquire a portion of the green bank's debt in the secondary market. Green banks can also incorporate credit enhancement measures, such as overcollateralization or loan loss reserves, to reduce creditors' exposure to default risk and secure improved ratings from credit agencies. Securitization enhances market liquidity for clean energy project financing, ultimately leading to a decrease in the cost of capital for borrowers. The Connecticut Green Bank executed one of the initial securitization deals, selling 75% of its $40 million PACE portfolio to Clean Fund, a specialty finance company.

== Financing structures ==
Green banks' innovative financing techniques are more effective when they can operate through robust delivery mechanisms. These structures enhance the security of debt service payments and enable lenders to offer lower interest rates for clean energy financing.

=== Property Assessed Clean Energy (PACE) ===
Property Assessed Clean Energy (PACE) financing allows consumers to repay energy upgrade loans through their property taxes. This process involves placing a lien on the property, with the property owner repaying the financing through PACE assessments included on their property tax bill. This approach reduces the default risk associated with a loan and provides incentives for private investment. Due to the reduced risk, consumers can secure loans with lower interest rates. When the property is sold, the new owners assume responsibility for loan repayment.

=== On-bill financing ===
On-bill financing enables consumers to repay energy upgrade loans through their utility bills. Similar to PACE financing, on-bill repayment provides lenders with security in a developing market. Since electricity is a necessity, utility bills have a very high repayment rate nationwide. Including loan payments on a utility bill enhances the likelihood of repayment, making it appealing to private investors and facilitating affordable loans for consumers. Additionally, the on-bill structure allows renters to benefit from increased energy efficiency. Furthermore, the simplicity of on-bill financing is appealing—tenants pay for the goods they consume, which makes sense logically.

== Market development activities ==
In some instances, the mere availability of clean energy financing products is insufficient to stimulate the desired level of clean energy finance activity. Various non-financial market development activities become necessary. A green bank might plan and execute a range of market development activities to nurture the clean energy market. These activities may not directly involve lending, and a green bank may engage an external organization to design and carry out these initiatives.

=== Demand aggregation ===
Green banks or their partners can consolidate consumer demand for clean energy projects and financing, reducing customer acquisition costs for contractors and providing scale for investors. One effective method for a green bank to aggregate demand is by offering neighborhood-wide group-buying deals. The Connecticut Green Bank and SolarizeCT have successfully implemented this approach across Connecticut.

=== Contractor training ===
Green banks can organize training programs for contractors, providing local clean energy technology installers, contractors, and developers with insights into various green bank financing options. Contractor training equips contractors with the knowledge of green bank financing products, enabling them to use this information as a valuable sales tool, thereby increasing the scale and volume of the projects they undertake. Ensuring that contractors have a comprehensive understanding of green bank financing is a crucial way to convey this information to the end-users of the financing—building owners.

=== REC financing ===
Innovative approaches to renewable energy credit (REC) financing have also enabled green banks to lower energy costs for consumers. Green banks can agree to acquire and monetize the RECs generated by a particular clean energy project. Upon obtaining possession of the RECs through the financing agreement, a green bank can subsequently sell them to utilities. This activity allows green banks to offer more favorable financing terms, while utilities can access RECs in substantial quantities, potentially at prices below the market rate. This reduces their compliance costs and enables them to pass on the savings to their ratepayers.

=== Central clearinghouse ===
Green banks also function as intermediaries between lenders and borrowers. They provide a central clearinghouse for all online data related to energy resources, including information on rebates and financing options. Additionally, they offer technical assistance for investors and project coordination services for contractors. By enhancing transparency and resource accessibility, green banks bridge the gap between the supply and demand for capital in clean energy projects.

== Organizational structure and placement ==
Green banks can take various forms. They may be newly established entities or repurposed from existing ones. A green bank can be a direct part of the government, functioning as a division of an existing agency. For instance, the New York Green Bank is a division of the New York State Energy Research and Development Authority (NYSERDA). Alternatively, a green bank can be a quasi-public instrumentality, such as a wholly owned non-profit public corporation. The Connecticut Green Bank, for example, operates as a quasi-public entity with a board composed of government officials and independent directors. It can also take the form of an independent non-profit entity administered by the government, either through a contract or by purpose-building an entity to serve as a green bank. The Montgomery County Green Bank, for instance, is a non-profit organization created in compliance with legislation and designated as Montgomery County's green bank through a resolution by the County Council.

== Sources of capital ==
Green banks are typically initiated with public capital, and this capital can be derived from various sources. The green bank financing model efficiently manages limited supplies of public capital, allowing each dollar to be continually reinvested and utilized for multiple clean energy projects.

=== Ratepayer surcharge ===
A state or local government may impose a modest surcharge on energy bills within its jurisdiction and mandate that the funds raised through this charge be allocated to a green bank. Alternatively, the government may reallocate an existing surcharge and direct the revenue to a green bank. This surcharge serves as a recurring source of capital for green banks, with funds replenished annually. The Connecticut Green Bank and New York Green Bank, for example, receive part of their capital from a systems benefit charge.

=== Bond issuance ===
Green banks can also raise capital through the issuance of bonds. Public sector bonds offer the advantage of being tax-exempt, enabling governments and other public authorities to access capital at relatively low interest rates for bondholders. The bonding authority of a green bank provides debt investors with a secure stream of payments from an institution with a low risk of default. In return, the green bank gains capital that can be promptly invested in clean energy projects.

==== Types of bonds ====
- Green banks can raise capital by issuing bonds backed by the state in which the green bank is established.
- Green banks may also capitalize themselves by issuing bonds backed by their own institution.
- Another approach is issuing project bonds secured by the revenue-generating potential of the projects they will support.
- Capital for green banks can be generated by issuing other bonds backed by a dedicated cash stream, such as ratepayer fees or proceeds from emissions allowance auctions.
- If a green bank requires additional capital, it can securitize loans it has extended (assets) and, through a secondary market, sell them to other investors in the form of bonds. For example, the Connecticut Green Bank sold $30 million in bonds backed by commercial efficiency loans to Clean Fund.
- For specific green bank activities, industrial revenue bonds and private activity bonds may be issued.

=== Revenue from carbon pricing ===
Green banks can also secure partial capitalization from revenues generated by various carbon pricing policies, such as carbon taxes, fees, and cap-and-trade systems. For instance, both the New York Green Bank (NYGB) and the Connecticut Green Bank (CGB) receive partial capitalization from the revenue generated by their respective states through initiatives like the Regional Greenhouse Gas Initiative (RGGI).

=== Direct budget appropriation ===
A government can allocate funds to a green bank as a part of its routine budget and appropriations process.

=== Re-allocation of existing funds ===
In some cases, underused or dormant investment funds may be re-allocated to support a green bank, putting these funds to work in furthering clean energy initiatives.

=== Pension funds ===
Pension funds can invest in deals or portfolios of deals originated by green banks, providing an opportunity for them to participate in green energy financing while potentially earning returns on their investments.

=== Foundations ===
Foundations can offer grants to green banks for covering startup costs, or they can make program-related investments in green banks that align with their mission, potentially earning returns on their investments while supporting clean energy initiatives.

=== Community Development Financial Institutions (CDFIs) ===
Community development financial institutions (CDFIs) can play a pivotal role in co-investing or providing initial capital for green banks. Additionally, CDFIs can offer valuable technical expertise in specific areas related to green bank activities. As an example, they are the main recipients of the $6 billion Clean Communities Investment Accelerator (see below).

=== Federal sources in the US ===
Green banks can also tap into various federal sources within the United States to secure funding and support for their clean energy initiatives:

- The United States Department of Agriculture (USDA), through its Rural Utilities Service (RUS) program, provides funding for infrastructure projects, including those related to energy, in rural communities. The RUS offers funding that can be harnessed by green banks to finance projects in rural areas.
- The United States Department of Energy (DOE) administers programs such as the Loan Program Office (LPO), which offers federal funding to innovative clean energy companies and project portfolios. Green banks can leverage DOE funding by constructing project portfolios designed to meet the LPO's criteria.
- The United States Environmental Protection Agency (EPA) manages the Clean Water State Revolving Fund (CWSRF), a lending program that provides low-cost financing for various water and energy infrastructure projects. The EPA also operates the Greenhouse Gas Reduction Fund (GGRF), a competitive grant program for smaller green banks, which makes up to $14 billion available to select green banks nationwide for a wide range of decarbonization investments.
  - The GGRF allocates $6 billion to green banks in low-income and historically disadvantaged communities for similar investments and directs $7 billion to state and local energy funds for decentralized solar power projects in communities lacking alternative financing options. The EPA set the deadline for the first two award initiatives on October 12, 2023, and the latter initiative on September 26, 2023. On April 4, 2024, the Biden administration announced the eight recipients of the first $20 billion of the Greenhouse Gas Reduction Fund. For the $14 billion National Clean Investment Fund, the recipients are the consumer-focused Climate United Fund ($6.97 billion to a consortium of Calvert Impact, Self-Help Ventures Fund and Community Preservation Corporation), the Coalition for Green Capital ($5 billion), and Power Forward Communities ($2 billion to a consortium of Enterprise Community Partners, Local Initiatives Support Corporation, United Way, Habitat for Humanity and Rewiring America); collectively they have pledged 60 percent of funds would go to low-income and marginalized communities, well above the 40 percent required by Biden. For the $6 billion Clean Communities Investment Accelerator program to disburse money exclusively and deep into such communities, they are four CDFI Intermediaries (Opportunity Finance Network, Inclusiv, Native CDFI Network and Appalachian Community Capital) receiving a total of roughly $5.1 billion, and a coalition of community organizations called the Justice Climate Fund receiving $940 million. The Biden administration projects that they will leverage $7 from the private sector for every dollar of public investment, and slash emissions by up to 40 million metric tons by 2032 through a very wide variety of projects. On April 22, the 60 recipients for the $7 billion Solar for All initiative were also announced, and were forecast to benefit 900,000 low-income households through $8 billion in energy bill savings.

However, in July 2025, President Donald Trump signed the One Big Beautiful Bill Act rescinding GGRF monies and repealing the IRA's Section 134.

== Current Green Banks ==
=== Solar and Energy Loan Fund of St. Lucie County, FL Inc. (SELF) ===
Founded in 2010, SELF was the first local green bank in the United States and remains the sole nonprofit green bank within Florida. SELF's inception was made possible through initial funding received from the U.S. Department of Energy's Energy Efficiency and Conservation Block Grant (EECGB) program. This institution plays a pivotal role as one of the founding members of the American Green Bank Consortium, and it holds a unique status as a Community Development Financial Institution (CDFI) certified by the U.S. Treasury Department. Moreover, SELF is associated with the Opportunity Finance Network (OFN) and stands as one of the pioneering GREEN CDFIs in the nation.

In its pursuit of low-cost loan capital, SELF collaborates with an array of partners, including bank Community Reinvestment Act (CRA) investors, faith-based organizations, crowdfunding platforms such as KIVA.org and CNote, health organizations, Program-Related Investments (PRIs), and impact investors. SELF's commitment revolves around providing accessible and affordable capital for energy efficiency, resilience, and solar technologies, with a particular focus on serving low- and moderate-income (LMI) and underbanked communities. By July 2022, SELF had expanded its operations to encompass four states, including Florida, Georgia, Alabama, and South Carolina. Additionally, SELF introduced new satellite programs in cities such as St. Petersburg, Tampa, Orlando, Miami, and Atlanta.

=== Connecticut Green Bank ===
Logo of Connecticut Green Bank

The Connecticut Green Bank (CGB) was established in 2011 and holds the distinction of being the first green bank in the United States. It has emerged as the most advanced green bank in the nation in terms of deal volume. The transformation occurred when Connecticut's legislature converted the Connecticut Clean Energy Fund, initially focused on granting clean energy investment, into a deployment financing entity. The CGB operates as a quasi-public institution, featuring a board of directors consisting of both government officials and independent directors. The CGB's funding is maintained through a systems benefit charge and revenue generated by Connecticut's participation in the Regional Greenhouse Gas Initiative (RGGI) trading program. Moreover, the bank has the capability to issue its own bonds based on its balance sheet.

In its initial four years of existence, the CGB succeeded in stimulating $663.2 million in investments for clean energy projects, with three-fourths of these funds originating from the private sector. Notably, this increase in clean energy investment was concurrent with a significant decrease in taxpayer-funded clean energy grants. In essence, the CGB bolstered clean energy investment while alleviating the financial burden on taxpayers.

=== New York Green Bank ===
Governor Andrew Cuomo established the largest Green Bank in the nation, NY Green Bank (NYGB), and endowed it with capital sourced from re-purposed ratepayer surcharges and revenues generated by the issuance of emissions permits. The New York State Energy Research and Development Authority (NYSERDA) devised a 5-year capitalization structure involving multiple infusions of capital amounting to $1 billion. The NYGB is now a fully staffed entity and functions as a wholesale clean energy finance lender, distinguishing itself from Connecticut, which operates more as a retail lender. Instead of designing specific financing products and programs, the NYGB relies on the market to discern the financing needs.

As of the present, the NYGB has received over $1 billion in proposals and maintains an active project pipeline of approximately $500 million. The first series of NYGB investments were unveiled in the autumn of 2015. The NYGB utilized $49 million of public capital to leverage $178 million in private capital, achieving a leverage ratio greater than 3:1.

=== New York City Energy Efficiency Corporation (NYCEEC) ===
NYCEEC was established in 2010, marking one of the earliest green banks in the United States. Initially, NYCEEC came into existence through the efforts of the New York City government, with funding provided by the American Recovery and Reinvestment Act of 2009. In May 2011, NYCEEC commenced its operations as a 501(c)(3) not-for-profit organization.

NYCEEC specializes in providing loans for various purposes, including energy efficiency, renewable energy, storage, and high-performance building projects in New York City and across the Northeast and Mid-Atlantic regions. The organization caters to a diverse range of real estate sectors, including affordable and market-rate multifamily, commercial, industrial, and institutional. It's worth noting that a majority of the loans extended by NYCEEC are situated in, or contribute to, low-and-moderate-income (LMI) communities. Furthermore, NYCEEC holds the role of administrator for the NYC Commercial Property Assessed Clean Energy (NYC C-PACE) Program, which was launched in 2021.2 As of June 2023, NYCEEC has mobilized over $430 million in capital for energy efficiency and clean energy projects, resulting in the enhancement of more than 430 buildings and the promotion of green practices in over 15,000 affordable housing units.

=== California CLEEN Center ===
The California Lending for Energy and Environmental Needs Center, operating as the state's green bank, is housed within the California Infrastructure and Economic Development Bank. One of the center's flagship initiatives, known as the Statewide Energy Efficiency Program (SWEEP), is dedicated to financing energy efficiency projects and upgrades for municipalities, universities, schools, and hospitals. In contrast to the Connecticut and New York Green Banks, the CLEEN Center exclusively focuses on facilitating commercial projects and upgrades. Interested parties propose their projects and apply for financial assistance through the CLEEN Center, with projects receiving funding ranging from $500,000 to $30 million.

=== Hawaii Green Infrastructure Authority ===
The Hawaii Green Infrastructure Authority was established in 2014 with the primary mission of financing clean energy development in Hawaii. Their initial program, the Green Energy Market Securitization (GEMS) program, was designed to address the needs of the low-to-moderate income market by offering solar lease financing. Given Hawaii's unique geographical circumstances, electricity costs are higher in Hawaii than in any other part of the United States. The introduction of solar leasing has provided an opportunity for many Hawaiian homeowners to install solar panels, but the penetration of the solar market among low-credit households has remained limited. The positive cash flow generated by GEMS aims to enable low-to-moderate income Hawaiians to access a market that has historically been out of their reach.

=== Rhode Island ===
In 2015, state legislators transformed the Rhode Island Clean Water Finance Agency (RICWFA) into the Rhode Island Infrastructure Bank (RIIB). The RIIB offers both residential and commercial PACE programs designed to reduce energy costs for consumers. The RIIB has also established the Efficient Buildings Fund, a program intended to provide low-cost financing for energy efficiency and renewable energy projects in public buildings.

=== Montgomery County, MD ===
Montgomery County, Maryland holds the distinction of being the sole county in the United States to have established a local green bank. The Montgomery County Green Bank (MCGB) was capitalized with $20 million from the settlement that accompanied the merger of utilities Pepco and Exelon.

=== Malaysia ===
The Green Technology Financing Corporation of Malaysia was launched in 2010 as part of the government's National Green Technology Policy. Operating under the Green Technology Financing Scheme, the corporation provides companies with a 2% interest rate reduction and a 60% guaranteed financing option for green technology projects.

=== United Kingdom ===
In 2012, the UK government established the UK Green Investment Bank (GIB) to attract private funds for financing private sector environmental preservation and improvement investments. It operates as a public limited company and is owned by the Department for Business, Innovation and Skills (BIS). The GIB is headquartered in Edinburgh, where it is also registered, and maintains a secondary office in London. The GIB is involved in various technologies, including energy efficiency, waste, bioenergy, offshore wind, and onshore renewables. The UK's GIB has committed £2.6 billion to 76 domestic infrastructure projects, mobilizing over £10 billion in private investment.

In March 2016, the UK government announced its intention to transition the GIB to the private sector. The government plans to divest its shares in the GIB but will aim to retain a 'special share' to safeguard the ongoing commitment to the GIB's green objectives.

=== Australia ===
Australia's Clean Energy Finance Corporation (CEFC) was established in 2012 with the mission of mobilizing investments in renewable energy, energy efficiency, and low emissions technologies. As of the beginning of the fiscal year 2016, the CEFC had invested $1.4 billion of its own capital and attracted $2.2 billion in private sector investment.

=== France ===
- Helios
- Green Got, a subsidiary of Belgian-based PPS EU SA

== Green Bank Network ==
The Green Bank Network is an international membership organization that focuses on clean energy finance solutions. It was launched at the 2015 COP21 meeting in Paris, with participation from state and national Green Banks in Connecticut, Australia, Malaysia, New York, Japan, and the United Kingdom, along with the non-profit organizations the Natural Resources Defense Council (NRDC) and the Coalition for Green Capital (CGC).

== See also ==
- Climate bond
- Ethical banking
- Market-based instruments
- Coalition for Green Capital
