= EU aviation emissions trading dispute =

In 2012, a trade dispute emerged between the European Union (EU) and other major economies over the inclusion of long-haul flights in the European Union Emissions Trading System (EU ETS). The EU had moved to apply its carbon pricing scheme to long-haul flights that arrived in or departed from EU airports, regardless of the airline's country of origin. The decision prompted strong diplomatic pushback from the United States, China, India, and other major economies, which argued that the measure infringed on national sovereignty and violated the Chicago convention, the main international aviation agreement. The dispute escalated into threats of retaliation, and the EU later suspended the requirement for flights entering or leaving its airspace.

== Background ==
The EU ETS is a carbon emission trading scheme that began in 2005, intended to lower greenhouse gas emissions in the EU. Aviation was initially not included within Directive 2003/87/EC, which created the EU ETS.

== Extension of ETS to aviation ==
A proposal to apply aviation to the EU ETS was released by European Commissioner for the Environment, Stavros Dimas on 20 December 2006, amending Directive 2003/87/EC which created the EU ETS. A final agreement on the proposal was reached between the Environment Council, the European Commission and the European Parliament on 26 June 2008, which was approved on 8 July 2008 with 640 MEPs voting yes, and 30 voting no, being formally adopted on 19 November 2008 and entering into force on 2 February 2009.

Following the passing of Directive 2008/101/EC, the Air Transport Association of America (ATAA) in July 2011 sought to prevent its enforcement by appealing to the European Court of Justice, arguing it contravened Article 1 (sovereignty) of the Chicago Convention. The ATAA received the backing of the United States government, which argued the scheme took money away from airlines that could be spent on better efficiency and aircraft upgrades.

=== Legal challenge ===
In October 2011, an indicative ruling by the Advocate General of the European Court of Justice found that the law was valid, which was affirmed by the full court on 21 December 2011, finding that Directive 2008/101/EC did not affect the Chicago Convention nor the Open Skies Agreement.

== International opposition ==
Immediately following the ruling, the United States Department of State stated that they were "disappointed by the decision of the court", with United States Secretary of State Hillary Clinton stating "appropriate action" would be taken if the scheme went ahead.

The 2012 Moscow Meeting, made up of Armenia, Argentina, Azerbaijan, Belarus, Brazil, Cameroon, China, Cuba, Chile, India, Japan, South Korea, Mexico, Malaysia, Nigeria, Paraguay, Russia, Saudi Arabia, the Seychelles, Singapore, South Africa, Uganda and the United States, published a joint declaration that the EU should immediately cease application of Directive 2008/101/EC. Igor Levitin, Russian transport minister, stated his belief that Directive 2008/101/EC conflicted with Article 1 of the Chicago Convention. The group of countries that diplomatically opposed application of the EU ETS to aviation was nicknamed the "Coalition of the Unwilling".

The United States passed the European Union Emissions Trading Scheme Prohibition Act of 2011, which empowers the United States Secretary of Transportation to prohibit US carriers from participating in the EU ETS, with China and India passing similar prohibitions. China threatened to withhold $60 billion in outstanding orders from Airbus, which in turn led to France pressuring the EU to freeze the scheme.

Economists Dieter Helm, Giovanni Ruta and Cameron Hepburn wrote in a paper that the threats against the EU were unlikely to be credible and that Directive 2008/101/EC could boost profits for some carriers, suggesting that threats such as Chinese cancellation of Airbus orders were only worth a small portion of the company's income, therefore the "economic logic" suggested that the EU should ignore the international opposition. Bill Hemmings, aviation programme manager for European Federation for Transport and Environment, wrote in The Guardian that the fact that the US only took action in 2012 despite being drawn up in 2007 implied that the US was "at the centre of the problem", and also came to the conclusion that the EU should "stand firm" on its position.

== "Stop the clock" suspension ==
On 12 November 2012, Connie Hedegaard, the European Commissioner for Climate Action, proposed suspending the application of the EU ETS on long-haul aviation, framing the move as a limited and conditional measure intended to facilitate progress toward a global solution on aviation emissions within the International Civil Aviation Organization (ICAO). Hedegaard emphasised that the proposal did not constitute a withdrawal of the EU's legal position, but rather a temporary pause in enforcement in order to "create space" for international negotiations, stating that the pause was to last until the November 2013 ICAO conference.

The European Law Blog said in November 2012 that stopping the clock on the aviation scheme came with legal risks, as Directive 2008/101/EC did not contain any provision that allowed the European Commission to suspend application of the directive, neither through delegation nor comitology.

Regulation (EU) No 421/2014 was introduced in 2014 which delayed legal enforcement of international flights in the EU ETS to "sustain the momentum reached" at the 2013 ICAO Assembly, however, flights within the European Economic Area did apply to the EU ETS. Regulation (EU) No 421/2014 pushed enforcement of Directive 2008/101/EC to 31 December 2016, by which point the European Commission would produce a report on further actions. At the 2016 ICAO Assembly, the Carbon Offsetting and Reduction Scheme for International Aviation (CORSIA) scheme was announced, to be implemented by 2020.
