= Green Investment Group =

Investment company based in Edinburgh, Scotland

Green Investment Group Limited
- Formerly: UK Green Investment Bank
- Type: Limited
- Founded: 2012; 14 years ago
- Headquarters: Edinburgh, Scotland, UK
- Area served: Worldwide
- Key people: Mark Dooley
- Parent: Macquarie Group
- Website: greeninvestmentgroup.com

Green Investment Group Limited (GIG), formerly the UK Green Investment Bank, is a specialist in green infrastructure principal investment, project delivery and the management of portfolio assets and related services. It is owned by the Macquarie Group.

The business was launched initially by the UK government in 2012 as the first institution of its type in the world. The organisation was acquired by the diversified financial group Macquarie Group Limited in 2017, creating one of Europe's largest teams of dedicated green infrastructure investors, and now operates under the name Green Investment Group. It has offices in London and Edinburgh.

== History ==
=== Origins ===
As a result of the Climate Change Act 2008, the United Kingdom became legally committed to significantly reducing its carbon emissions by 2050. More importantly, the Act committed the UK to generating a significantly higher percentage of its energy from renewable sources by 2020.

A non-partisan, House of Commons committee on climate change was established to study and recommend ways of meeting the country's obligations. The committee reported that for a new, low-carbon business and government infrastructure to be established, the necessary investment would range between £200 billion and £1 trillion over the next two decades.

The committee further stated that since traditional sources of capital for investment in green infrastructure could not provide even half that amount by 2025, there would be a funding gap that needed to be covered by the state budget.

In 2009, two reports were published advocating the creation of a state-backed infrastructure bank to provide financing to green projects. The first, entitled "Accelerating Green Infrastructure Financing: Outline proposals for UK green bonds and infrastructure bank" was published in March 2009 by Climate Change Capital and E3G. The second, entitled "Delivering a 21st Century Infrastructure for Britain" was published by Policy Exchange in September 2009 and was written by Dieter Helm, James Wardlaw and Ben Caldecott. These proposals were then contained in the manifestos of each of the main political parties for the 2010 UK General Election.

The Fiscal year 2010 British government budget contained the first mention of a "green investment bank" scheme, earmarked with £2 billion. Chancellor Alistair Darling stated that the Labour government was committed "to support offshore wind energy" and other forms of alternative energy, which he also billed as "crucial to guiding the country out of recession".

After the 2010 general election, the newly formed Conservative-Liberal Democrat coalition government defined its primary economic objective to be the drastic reduction of Britain's debt and yearly deficits. Accordingly, the government sought to create a financing scheme for the environmental investment needs of the country that would be funded mainly by the private sector, including the banks.

In June 2010 the Green Investment Bank Commission, established by George Osborne in opposition, after holding hearings recommended that the government created an eponymous banking entity within the year. Chancellor George Osborne remained sceptical after objections to the creation of such a bank were raised by the Treasury, since a Green Investment Bank would "swell the state deficit" as it would appear as a liability on the government's balance sheet.

The UK government's Spending Review of October 2010 that announced a raft of austerity measures to deal with the UK government deficit, also included an announcement about the creation of a Green Investment Bank. The government expected to obtain by early 2013 the European Commission's approval for state aid to the Bank, with investment in green projects estimated to begin by April 2012.

=== Criticism ===
The plans for the environmental funding scheme were endorsed by Greenpeace, whose executive director urged the prime minister to "get personally involved", as well as by a number of similar organisations, such as Transform UK, whose director stated that "the only cost the Treasury should consider is the cost of failure to unleash this institution's massive potential to re-power our economy." Environmentalists engaged in public demonstrations demanding a quicker implementation of the plans.

However, non-government organisations and environmentalists criticised the scheme because it lacked ambition. The World Development Movement disputed that such a small scheme will attract the kind of investment needed to "generate green jobs, green industry and a green economy in the UK". An economic study commissioned by WDM and Platform recommended that, instead of creating a new "banking scheme", the government should "transform the [already] publicly-owned Royal Bank of Scotland into a powerful green investment bank", in the process also "creating 50,000 green jobs".

In May 2011, a former adviser to the government, Jonathon Porritt, who had been head of the Sustainable Development Commission, publicly criticised the Coalition's scrapping of a planned rise in aviation tax, its watering down of schemes that promote small-scale renewable electricity and its failure to promote a "green investment bank" with immediate borrowing powers. Mr Porritt claimed he examined 75 policies on which the government had committed itself, finding little or no progress in 55. The government responded that it remains "committed to the environment", but claimed that the economic recession had affected environmental policies.

The leader of the Green Party of England and Wales (and MP for Brighton Pavilion) Caroline Lucas, criticised the nomenclature of the GIB in January 2011, when she wrote that "It's a bit rich to call [the GIB] a green investment bank if it can neither borrow nor lend". Lucas argued that without these powers, "it would be a fund – that is, a pot of money that, once used up, is gone forever.".

Criticism also centred on the location of the institution. Bloomberg claimed that "Most of the 50- 70 jobs will initially be in London..." and some questioned that the decision to locate many jobs in London, despite the announcement headline of Edinburgh being chosen as winner of the location contest, pointed to a "bid to defuse Scottish independence... a blatant move to unite the capitals over Alex Salmond's key policy."

=== Creation ===
On 23 May 2011, Deputy Prime Minister Nick Clegg at a speech at Climate Change Capital stated that the Green Investment Bank "will begin operating in April 2012", adding that the bank's early targets would be "offshore wind, waste and non-domestic energy efficiency". Clegg added that legislation would "ensure the independence of the institution."

On 24 May 2011, Business Secretary Vince Cable, in addressing the parliament, stated that the bank will become "a key component" of the transition to a "low-carbon economy", which will need "significant investment over the coming decades." Cable also stated that the GIB will have an initial capitalisation of £3 billion, which "the Government believes will leverage a further £15 billion of private investment".

The same day, BIS, in a press release containing answers to "frequently asked questions" about the bank, outlined the planned finances of the GIB and its activation in "three phases":

- Incubation (April 2012 until state aid approval): Government makes direct financial investments in the "green economy".
- Establishment (following state aid approval): UK Green Investment Bank established as a "stand-alone institution".
- Full borrowing powers (ca. 2015–16): Bank given powers to borrow, "subject to public sector's net-debt falling as a percentage of GDP".

Dr Cable unveiled on the same day his department's statement of vision for the bank. The document was cautiously positive about the prospects of private investment in the environment in the UK.

BIS appeared to indicate on 12 December 2011 that the 'Incubation' phase had progressed, with the announcement of a new team within the department: UK Green Investments (UKGI). It stated the team's role was to "drive investment in the UK’s green infrastructure until the Green Investment Bank is formally established". Initially the UKGI team consisted of six members: five men and one woman.

State aid approval for the bank was granted by the EU Commission on 17 October 2012, allowing the bank to become fully established. The bank was subsequently formally launched in Edinburgh by Vince Cable on 28 November 2012.

=== Privatisation ===
In June 2015 the Business Secretary Sajid Javid put forward proposals to part-privatise the bank, with the stated aim of giving it full access to the capital markets. On 18 August 2017 the bank was sold to Macquarie Group for £2.3 billion.

== Management ==
On 25 May 2011, Vince Cable informed the House of Commons that BIS would appoint Sir Adrian Montague, CBE, chairman of private equity firm 3i, to lead a team of "independent financial experts" in setting up the UK Green Investment Bank before it started work the following year. Cable stated that the bank would be initially staffed by up to 100 people tasked with "financing the Coalition's plans for a low-carbon economy".

On 25 May 2012, Lord Smith of Kelvin was announced as the first Chair of the bank by Vince Cable. Shaun Kingsbury was the bank's chief executive from October 2012 to 2017.

== See also ==
- Cap and trade
- Eco-investing
- Trust fund
