= Smith School =

Smith School may refer to:

- Abiel Smith School, a school for African American children in Boston in the 1800s
- Smith School of Enterprise and the Environment at Oxford University
- Robert H. Smith School of Business at the University of Maryland
- Stephen J.R. Smith School of Business at Queens University in Ontario, Canada
