= Saving for Retirement: Intention, Context, and Behavior =

2012 book by Gordon L. Clark, Kendra Strauss, and Janelle Knox-Hayes

- Cover
- Editors: Gordon L. Clark, Kendra Strauss, and Janelle Knox-Hayes
- Language: English
- Subject: Pensions, political economy, public and nonprofit management pensions, pension management
- Genre: Non-fiction
- Publisher: Oxford University Press
- Publication date: 5 January 2012
- Publication place: United Kingdom and United States
- Pages: 224
- ISBN: 9780199600854

Saving for Retirement: Intention, Context, and Behavior is a 2012 book by Gordon L. Clark, Kendra Strauss, and Janelle Knox-Hayes. The book explores the evolving landscape of retirement savings, focusing on the increasing responsibility placed on individuals as governments and employers reduce their roles in providing retirement income. The authors delve into the behavioral revolution in financial decision-making, considering how social identity and societal resources influence savings behavior. Using UK databases, the book presents empirical evidence to support an integrated approach to financial decision-making and advocates for the rethinking of individual behavior and the design of retirement income systems.

== Summary ==
The book studies how individuals navigate the complexities of saving for retirement in the modern financial landscape. This book situates its analysis within the broader context of the financial crisis and the subsequent economic, political, and social challenges that have influenced the retirement saving environment.

As developed economies face the repercussions of financial globalization, marked by significant private and public debt accumulation and misjudgments within the financial industry, the authors delve into the implications for retirement savings. The transition from defined benefit (DB) schemes to defined contribution (DC) schemes has shifted the risk from firms and the state to individual households, a shift exacerbated by aging populations and the strain on state-sponsored pension provisions.

The book emphasizes the critical need to move beyond traditional rational choice models by integrating insights from social psychology and behavioral economics. It highlights how variables such as social backgrounds, geographic locations, gender, and cultural contexts influence individuals' investment decisions and risk profiles. By mapping out these factors, the authors reveal distinct regional risk cultures and social stratifications that affect retirement saving behaviors.

In Chapters 1 and 2, the authors provide an introduction to the different concepts, debates, and literature surrounding retirement savings. Empirical analysis forms the core of the book from Chapters 3 to 7, utilizing a representative survey of DC participants to investigate various retirement saving methods, including asset allocation, housing, and annuities. The study identifies two archetypes of investors: the naive investor, who lacks a comprehensive understanding of financial information and global market instability, and the sophisticated investor, who critically evaluates financial data and comprehends market volatility. The predominance of naive investors underscores the necessity for state programs and financial firms to guide individuals toward effective retirement planning.

In Chapter 8, the authors introduce the concept of "new paternalism", illustrating the crucial role of private and public agents in assisting individuals to make sound investment choices. They stressed how this guidance is imperative in a DC-dominated environment where information asymmetry between institutional investors and individuals is significant.

The book primarily focuses on the UK, but it raises pertinent questions about how different ecologies of finance might vary across capitalist economies.

== Reviews ==
Adam D. Dixon, from the University of Bristol, praised the book for its significant contribution to understanding retirement savings and financial decision-making within the framework of economic and social geography. Dixon highlighted the book's timely critique of the behavioral revolution in social sciences, noting its relevance in demonstrating how individual context (such as cultural, societal, and environmental factors) profoundly shapes decision-making over the life course. He commended the authors for challenging the reliance on universal models of human behavior and stressing the importance of considering diverse sociodemographic characteristics in financial planning policies. Dixon also underscored the book's policy relevance and its engagement with broader social science and policy communities on critical economic issues.

Alan Shipman, from the Open University, commended the book for its insightful empirical research into retirement saving behaviors. Shipman appreciated the authors' challenge to the conventional wisdom of behavioral economics, stressing the importance of social context and demographic factors in financial decision-making. He underscored the thorough examination of risk aversion and the varying influences on retirement planning across different socio-economic groups. Shipman viewed the book's critique of "libertarian paternalist" approaches and its call for more collectively managed retirement systems as significant contributions to the discourse on pension policy and financial education.

Rodrigo Fernandez, from the University of Amsterdam, highlighted the book's examination of the shift from defined benefit to defined contribution pension schemes, emphasizing the increased risk burden on individuals. He appreciated the book's empirical investigation into how social and institutional contexts influence individual investment decisions for retirement. Fernandez praised the integration of social psychology and behavioral economics in understanding these decisions, and noted the book's contribution to economic geography by mapping regional risk cultures. He acknowledged the book's relevance in the context of ongoing financial crises and its focus on the UK's pension landscape, while suggesting that it would be beneficial to explore these dynamics across different capitalist systems.
