= Danny Dorling =

British social geographer (born 1968)

Daniel Dorling FRSA FRGS FRSS FAcSS
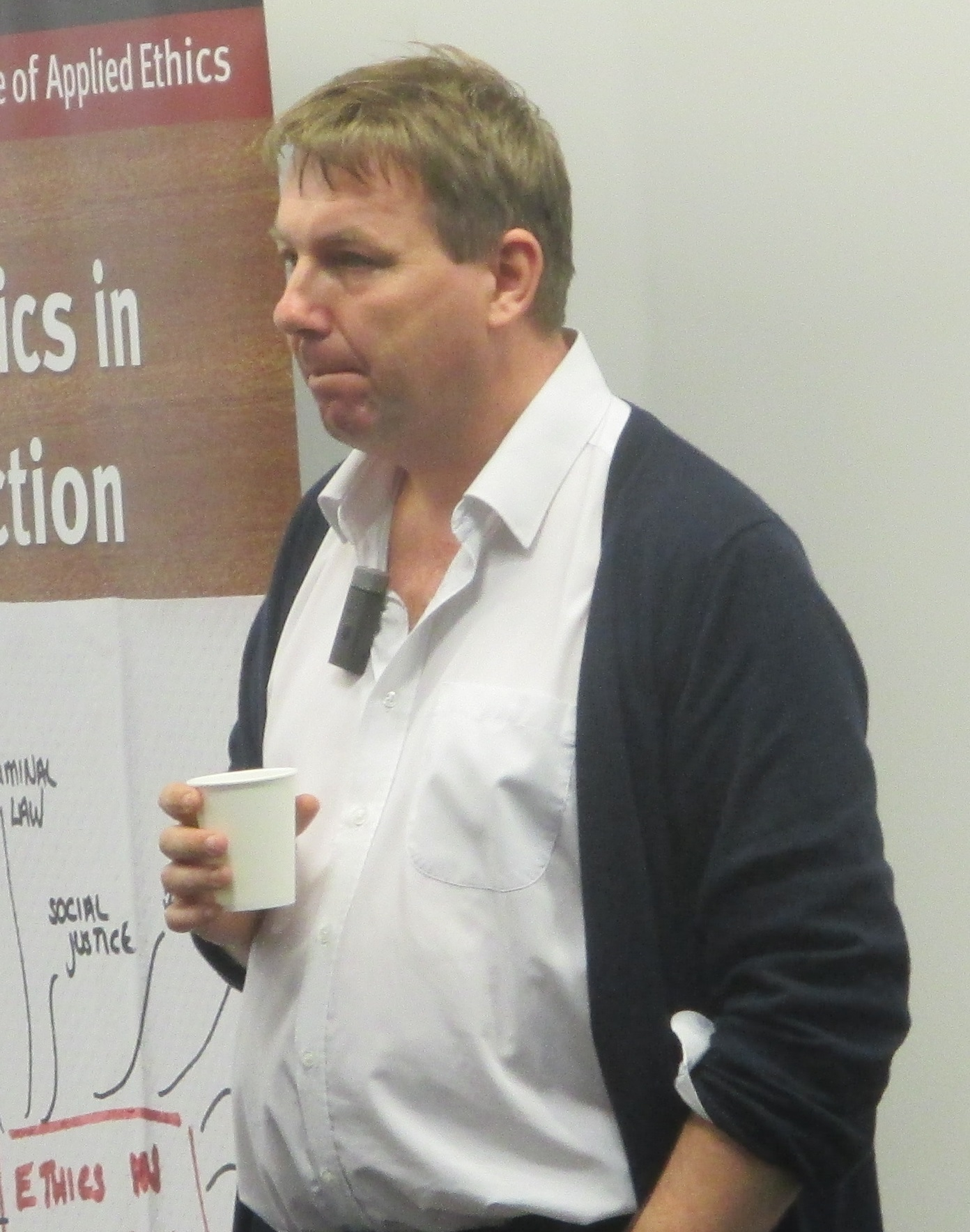
- Dorling in 2018
- Born: 16 January 1968 (age 58); Oxford, England
- Education: University of Newcastle
- Scientific career
- Fields: Geography; Statistics; Demography; Epidemiology; Sociology
- Workplaces: University of Oxford; University of London; University of Sheffield; University of Bristol; University of Leeds; University of Newcastle

Danny Dorling FRSA FRGS FRSS FAcSS (born 16 January 1968) is a British social geographer. He is currently 1971 Professor of Geography (known as the Halford Mackinder Professor of Geography prior to February 2025) attached to St Peter's College at the University of Oxford; a post he has held since appointed in September 2013.

Dorling is a visiting professor in the Department of Sociology of Goldsmiths, University of London, a visiting professor in the School of Social and Community Medicine of the University of Bristol, a visiting fellow at the Institute for Public Policy Research, a member of the National Advisory Panel for the policy Centre for Labour and Social Studies (CLASS) Thinktank, and since 2011, a patron of RoadPeace.

Dorling became a Fellow of the Royal Geographical Society (FRGS) and a Fellow of the Royal Statistical Society (FRSS) in 1989, a Fellow of the Academy of Social Sciences (FAcSS) in 2003, a Fellow of the Royal Society of Arts (FRSA) in 2010, an Honorary Fellow of the Faculty of Public Health (HonFFPH) in 2014, a senior associate member of the Royal Society of Medicine (SARSM) in 2015, and an honorary Doctor of the University of York in 2019.

From 2007 to 2017 Dorling was the honorary president of the Society of Cartographers.

== Early life and education ==
Born in Oxford, Dorling attended local state schools, including Cheney School, a coeducational comprehensive and was employed as a play-worker in children's summer play-schemes. Dorling graduated with a Bachelor of Science with Honours in Geography, Mathematics and Statistics at the University of Newcastle in 1989 and completed a PhD in the Visualization of Spatial Social Structure under the supervision of Stan Openshaw in 1991.

== Academic career ==
From 1991 to 1993, Dorling was a Joseph Rowntree Foundation Fellow and from 1993 to 1996 he was British Academy Fellow at the University of Newcastle. From 1996 to 2000, he was on the faculty of the School of Geographical Sciences at the University of Bristol. From 2000 to 2003 he was Professor of Quantitative Human Geography at the University of Leeds. From 2003 to 2013 he was Professor of Human Geography and also in 2013 he was Professor for the Public Understanding of Social Science at the University of Sheffield.

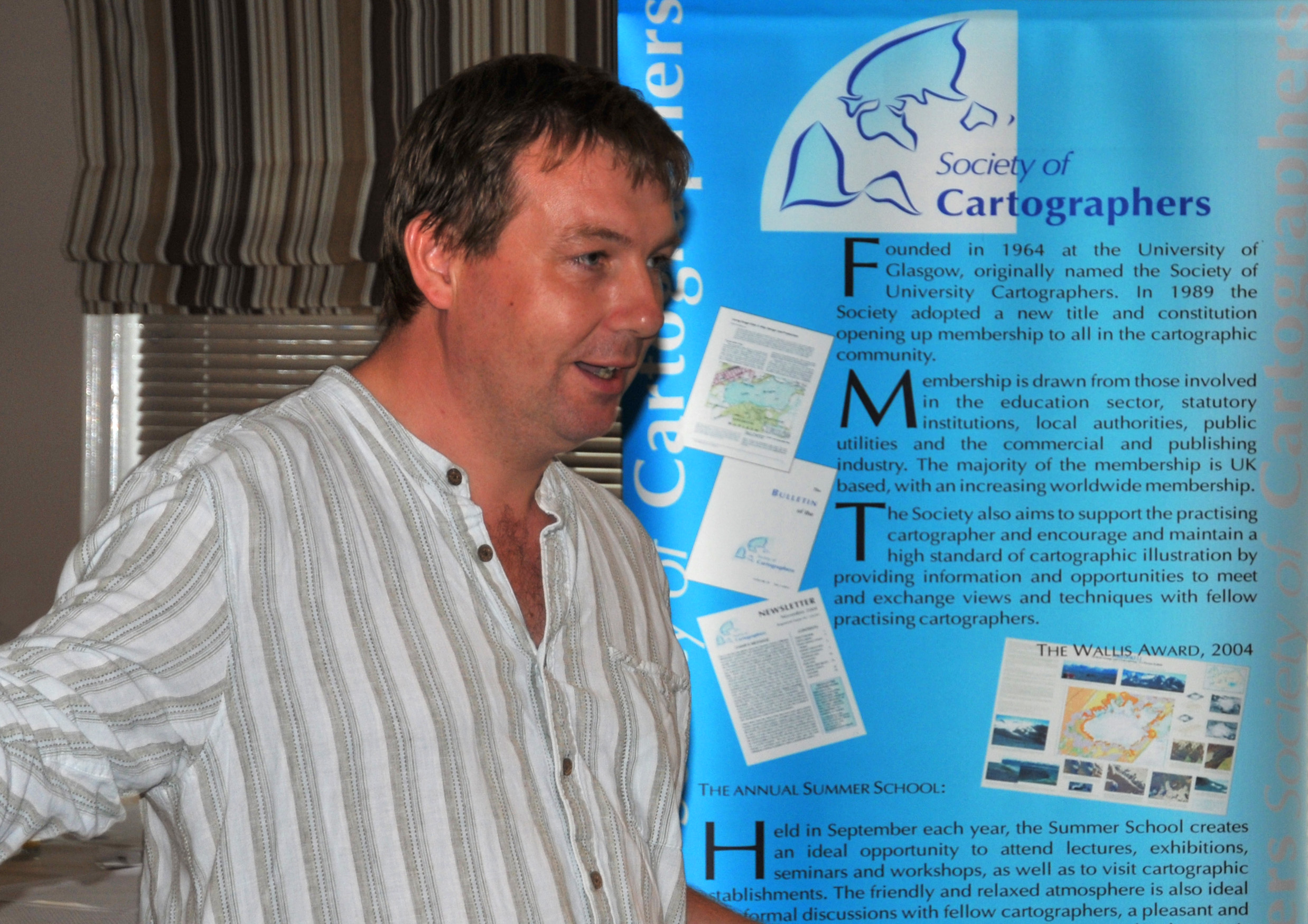
Dorling in 2011

In Dorling's inaugural lecture as Halford Mackinder Professor of Geography in September 2013 he spoke about the increasing disparity between Britain's majority and its richest 1%. He said, "Income inequality has now reached a new maximum and, for the first time in a century, even those just below the richest 1% are beginning to suffer, to see their disposable income drop."

Dorling has mapped (mainly using cartograms), analysed and commented upon UK demographic statistics. In 2005 he co-founded the Internet-based Worldmapper project, which now has about 700 world maps and spreadsheets of international statistics. He has spoken on radio, featured on television and written newspaper articles.

== Views ==
Dorling was very supportive of Jeremy Corbyn as Labour Party leader during his leadership from September 2015 until April 2020. In May 2016, Dorling said, "Jeremy Corbyn can take on the zealots and bigots who use migration to stir up fear and hatred. His popular appeal is not based on stoking up current prejudices. It is based on conviction, love and compassion. Just how cynical do you have to be not to see the hope and possibility in that?" In May 2017, he appeared in a Labour Party political broadcast – "Labour Stands With You" – filmed by Ken Loach and published a week before the 2017 United Kingdom general election.

== Reception ==
In February 2006, Dorling's work in human geography was described as "rummaging around" in numbers, crunching his way through reams of raw data, building up an extraordinary picture of poverty and wealth in contemporary Britain.

In April 2010, an editorial in The Guardian was entitled "In Praise of Danny Dorling".

== Works ==
=== Atlases ===
- Dorling, D. (1995). A New Social Atlas of Britain, London: John Wiley and Sons.
- Champion, T., Wong, C., Rooke, A., Dorling, D., Coombes, M. and Brunsdon, B. (1996). The Population of Britain in the 1990s: a social and economic atlas, Oxford: Oxford University Press.
- Dorling, D. and Thomas, B. (2004). People and Places: A 2001 census atlas of the UK, Bristol: Policy Press.
- Dorling, D. (2005). Human Geography of the UK. 2nd revised edition, cartography by Hennig, B. (2012) The Population of the UK, London: Sage.
- Thomas, B. and Dorling, D. (2007). Identity in Britain: A cradle‐to‐grave atlas, Bristol: Policy Press.
- Dorling, D., Newman, M. and Barford, A. (2008, 2010). The Atlas of the Real World: Mapping the way we live, London: Thames and Hudson. Also translated into Dutch, French, German, Italian, Japanese and Korean.
- Shaw, M., Davey Smith, G., Thomas, B., and Dorling, D. (2008). The Grim Reaper’s road map: an atlas of mortality in Britain, Bristol: Policy Press.
- Dorling, D. and Thomas, B. (2011). Bankrupt Britain: An atlas of social change, Bristol: Policy Press.
- Ballas, D., Dorling, D. and Hennig, B. (2014). The social atlas of Europe, Bristol: Policy Press.
- Dorling, D. and Thomas, B. (2016). People and Places: A 21st-century atlas of the UK, Bristol: Policy Press.
- Ballas, D., Dorling, D. and Hennig, B. (2017). The Human Atlas of Europe: A continent united in diversity, Bristol: Policy Press.

=== Books ===
- Dorling, D. (1996). Area cartograms: their use and creation, Concepts and Techniques in Modern Geography series no. 59, University of East Anglia: Environmental Publications.
- Dorling, D. (1997). Death in Britain: How local mortality rates have changed: 1950s–1990s, York: Joseph Rowntree Foundation.
- Dorling, D. (2010). Injustice: Why social inequality persists, Bristol: Policy Press. Extensively revised edition (2015).
- Dorling, D. (2011). So you think you know about Britain? The surprising truth about modern Britain, London: Constable and Robinson.
- Dorling, D. (2011). Fair Play: A reader on social justice, Bristol: Policy Press.
- Dorling, D. (2011). The No-Nonsense Guide to Equality, Oxford: New Internationalist.
- Dorling, D. (2012). The Visualization of Social Spatial Structure, Chichester: Wiley.
- Dorling, D. (2013). Unequal Health: The scandal of our times, Bristol: Policy Press.
- Dorling, D. (2013). The 32 Stops: lives on London’s Central Line, London: Penguin.
- Dorling, D. (2013). Population 10 Billion: The coming demographic crisis and how to survive it, London: Constable and Robinson.
- Dorling, D. (2014). All that is Solid: The great housing disaster, London: Allen Lane.
- Dorling, D. (2014). Inequality and the 1%, London: Verso.
- Dorling, D. (2015). Injustice: Why social inequality still persists, Bristol: Policy Press.
- Dorling, D. (2016). A Better Politics : How government can make us happier, London: London Publishing Partnership.
- Dorling, D. (2017). The Equality Effect: Improving life for everyone, Oxford: New Internationalist.
- Dorling, D. (2017). Do We Need Economic Equality, Cambridge: Polity Press.
- Dorling, D. (2018). Peak Inequality, Bristol: Policy Press.
- Dorling, D. (2020). Slowdown: The End of the Great Acceleration – and Why It's Good for the Planet, the Economy, and our Lives, New Haven & London: Yale University Press.
- Dorling, D. (2023). Shattered Nation: Inequality and the Geography of a Failing State, Verso Books.
- Dorling, D. (2024). Seven Children: Inequality and Britain's Next Generation, Hurst Publishers.
- Dorling, D. (2024). Peak Injustice: Solving Britain's Inequality Crisis, Policy Press.
- Dorling, D. (2025) The next crisis: what we think about the future, https://dannydorling.org/books/thenextcrisis/

Verso].

=== Collaborations ===
- Dorling, D. and Atkins, D. (1995). Population density, change and concentration in Great Britain 1971,1981 and 1991, London: HMSO/Office of Population Censuses and Surveys.
- Atkins, D., Champion, T., Coombes, M., Dorling, D. and Woodward, R. (1996). Urban Trends In England: Latest Evidence from the 1991 Census, London: HMSO/Department of the Environment.
- Dorling, D. and Woodward, R. (1996). Social polarisation 1971–1991: a micro-geographical analysis of Britain, Progress in Planning Volume 45, Issue 2. Oxford: Elsevier.
- Dorling, D. and Fairbairn, D. (1997). Mapping: Ways of Representing the World, London: Longman.
- Bartley, M., Blane, D., Brunner, E., Dorling, D., Ferrie, J., Jarvis, M., Marmot, M., McCarthy, M., Shaw, M., Sheiham, A., Stansfeld, S., Wadsworth, M. and Wilkinson, R. (1998, 2003) Social determinants of health: the solid facts, Copenhagen: World Health Organization.
- Gordon, D., Davey Smith, G., Dorling, D. and Shaw, M. (1999) Inequalities in Health: the evidence, edited collection of twenty chapters, Bristol: Policy Press.
- Shaw, M., Dorling, D., Gordon, D. and Davey Smith, G. (1999, 2000). The Widening Gap: Health inequalities and policy in Britain, Bristol: Policy Press.
- Dorling, D. and Simpson, S. (1999, 2000). Statistics in Society: the arithmetic of politics, edited collection of over forty chapters, London: Arnold.
- Mitchell, R., Dorling, D. and Shaw, M. (2000). Inequalities in Life and Death: What If Britain Were More Equal?, Joseph Rowntree Foundation, Bristol: Policy Press.
- Johnston, R., Pattie, C., Rossiter, D. and Dorling, D. (2001). From votes to seats: The operation of the UK electoral system since 1945, Manchester University Press.
- Davey Smith, G., Dorling, D. and Shaw, M. (eds) (2001). Poverty, inequality and health: 1800–2000 – a reader., Bristol: Policy Press.
- Shaw, M., Dorling, D. and Mitchell, R. (2002). Health, Place and Society, Harlow: Pearson Education.
- Ballas, D., Rossiter, D, Thomas, B, Clarke, G.P. and Dorling, D. (2004). Geography matters: simulating the local impacts of national social policies, Joseph Rowntree Foundation, York: York Publishing Services.
- Dorling, D., Ford, J., Holmans, A., Sharp, C., Thomas, B. and Wilcox, S. (2005). The great divide: an analysis of housing inequality, London: Shelter.
- Wheeler, B., Shaw, M., Mitchell, R. and Dorling, D. (2005). Life in Britain: Using Millennial Census data to understand poverty, inequality and place, Bristol: Policy Press.
- Hillyard, P., Pantazis C., Tombs, S., Gordon, D., and Dorling, D. (2005). Criminal Obsessions: Why Harm Matters More Than Crime, London: Crime and Society Foundation.
- Dorling, D., Rigby, J., Wheeler, B., Ballas, D., Thomas, B., Fahmy, E., Gordon, D., and Lupton, R. (2007). Poverty, wealth and place in Britain, 1968 to 2005, Joseph Rowntree Foundation, Bristol: Policy Press.
- Pickett, K., Melhuish, E., Dorling, D., Bambra, C., McKenzie, K., Chandola, T., Jenkins, A., Nazroo, J., Kendig, H., Phillipson, C., Maynard, A. (2014). ″If you could do one thing...″ Nine local actions to reduce health inequalities (20mph Speed Limits for Cars in Residential Areas, by Shops and Schools), London: British Academy.
- Dorling, D. and Lee, C. (2016). Geography: Ideas in Profile, London: Profile Books.
- Dorling, D. and Gietel-Baston, S. (2017). Why Demography Matters, Cambridge: Polity Press.
- Dorling, D. and Tomlinson, S. (2019) Rule Brittania: Brexit and the end of Empire, London: Biteback Publishing.
- Dorling, D. and Koljonen, A. (2020). Finntopia: What We Can Learn from the World’s Happiest Country, Newcastle & New York: Agenda publishing / Columbia University Press.
