= Coalition for Green Capital =

U.S. non-profit organization

The Coalition for Green Capital (CGC) is a 501(c)(3) non-profit that works with governments at the international, national, state and local level to establish green bank finance institutions to accelerate the deployment of renewable energy, energy efficiency, and sustainable transport.

== Activities ==
CGC partners with governments throughout the U.S. and abroad to design and launch green banks tailored to the specific needs of each market. Through partnerships with existing green banks and research, CGC investigates and develops new ways that green banks can grow clean energy markets. CGC also works with policymakers, industry associations, and other key stakeholders to share information about the green bank concept, and what Green Banks have already achieved. As a non-profit, CGC is primarily funded by many of the leading climate and energy focused-foundations.

CGC lists its on-going work on its website.

== History ==
CGC was created as an outgrowth of Reed Hundt and Kenneth Berlin's efforts with the 2008 Obama-Biden Transition Team to promote financing for clean energy and energy efficiency, and initially focused on advocating for a federal-level green bank.

The green bank concept was included in the Waxman-Markey climate change bill that passed the US House of Representatives in 2009. However, climate change legislation was unable to pass the Senate, and the CGC turned its attention to creating a state-level green bank.

The CGC helped newly elected Governor Dannel Malloy (working closely with his newly appointed Commissioner of Energy and Environmental Protection, Dan Esty) re-purpose the Connecticut Clean Energy Fund to create the nation's first green bank. The Connecticut green bank has since demonstrated the power of the green bank model, using limited public funds to attract over $491.2m of private investment in the Connecticut clean energy economy from 2012 to 2015.

Since that time, and based on Connecticut's success, interest in the green bank concept has grown significantly. CGC now works in over a dozen states that are at some state of green bank development or consideration. CGC continues to work at the federal level, supporting the introduce of the Green Bank Acts of 2014 and 2016. CGC works increasingly at the international level, particularly with the formation of the Global Green Bank Network.

=== Green Bank Act of 2016 ===
CGC provided technical support for the Green Bank Act of 2016, which was introduced in the House by Congressman Chris Van Hollen (D-MD) on July 14, 2016, with seven co-sponsors. CGC also provided technical support for the companion legislation that was introduced in the Senate by Senators Chris Murphy (D-CT), Richard Blumenthal (D-CT) and Sheldon Whitehouse (D-RI) on September 22, 2016.

=== Montgomery County, Maryland ===
CGC has played an extensive role in the creation of the Montgomery County Green Bank (MCGB), the first local green bank in the country. CGC provided technical guidance in drafting legislation in line with the county's needs, worked with County staff to manage the working group process, and is helping stand up and operationalize the new green bank.

=== Green Bank Network ===
CGC and NRDC, along with six founding green bank members, launched the Green Bank Network (GBN) in December 2015. Since then, CGC and NRDC been building the organization. At a White House-sponsored side event of the Clean Energy Ministerial (CEM) in May 2016, the GBN announced the signing of a Memorandum of Understanding among founding members agreeing to principles and mission of the GBN.
