= Ecosecurities =

ecosecurities
- Company type: Private
- Industry: Carbon Finance
- Founded: 1997; 29 years ago
- Headquarters: Geneva, Switzerland
- Number of locations: Regional hubs in Europe, Americas, Asia and Middle East
- Area served: Worldwide
- Products: Climate Solutions
- Services: Forestry, Waste Management, Energy Efficiency
- Owner: Pablo Fernandez & BVRio
- Website: ecosecurities.com

ecosecurities is a company specialized in carbon markets and greenhouse gas (GHG) mitigation projects worldwide. ecosecurities specializes in sourcing, developing and financing projects on renewable energy, energy efficiency, forestry and waste management with a positive environmental impact.

The company has offices in Europe, the Middle East, South America and Asia. It has a large portfolio of greenhouse gas emission reduction projects covering numerous countries and technologies.

== History ==
ecosecurities was founded in January 1997, by environmental entrepreneurs Pedro Moura Costa and Marc Stuart. ecosecurities progressed carbon markets and climate policies.

In 2005, EcoSecurities Group Plc was listed in the London Stock Exchange, raising capital for an expansion drive that resulted in offices in 33 countries run by over 350 employees. This enabled the company to develop over 700 CDM projects located in 45 countries and using 50 technologies. These projects resulted in the largest carbon credit portfolio worldwide, worth over USD 4 billion, giving the company a significant global market share.

In June 2007, the company raised an additional €150 million to expand into new markets, with Credit Suisse becoming a major investor. Its trades in the international carbon market were valued at USD 41 billion in the first six months of 2008.

In 2009, the company was acquired by U.S. investment bank JP Morgan, when the company subsequently delisted from the Alternative Investment Market of the London Stock Exchange. In 2012, Eco Securities was sold to Swiss trader Mercuria Energy Group.

In 2019, former ecosecurities manager Pablo Fernandez and BVRio (an environmental markets NGO created by ecosecurities co-founder, Pedro Moura Costa) acquired the company and reactivated its project pipeline, contracts book, and alumni network, to participate in a new phase of carbon and environmental markets.

== Achievements ==
some of the innovations pursued by ecosecurities include:

- Development of the first carbon offset verification system worldwide, leading to the mandatory requirement of certification of carbon credits adopted by the CDM. Service licensed to Swiss certification major SGS, in 1997;
- Assistance in structuring the first nation-wide carbon offset scheme, for Costa Rica in 1997;
- Structuring the first prospectus-based forest and carbon investment scheme, for Australia Plantation Timber, in 1999;
- Creation of the first methodology for the Clean Development Mechanism (CDM), in 2004;
- Development of the first CDM project registered by the UNFCCC – the NovaGerar Landfill Project in Brazil, in 2005;
- Structuring of the first carbon-backed debt notes, purchased by Credit Suisse, in 2005;
- Structuring of the first carbon credit securitization instrument, with Credit Suisse, in 2007.

== The compliance carbon market ==
Eco Securities operates in both the compliance and voluntary carbon markets. In the compliance market, EcoSecurities implements projects in 11 countries under the Kyoto Protocol Clean Development Mechanism (CDM) to generate Certified Emission Reductions (CERs) which are used by governments and organizations under the Kyoto Protocol and European Union Emissions Trading Scheme (EU ETS). Among the more than 700 Clean Development Mechanism projects that Eco Securities has helped develop, the list includes:

- NovaGerar landfill (also known as CTR Nova Iguaçu) in Rio de Janeiro, Brazil, the first project registered with the CDM worldwide;
- Small scale hydroelectricity project at Cuyamaca, Honduras, the first to be issued with carbon credits by the CDM Executive Board;
- Energy Efficient Cookstoves in Myanmar, Installation of energy efficient Improved Cooking Stoves in the households of small communities in Myanmar;
- Ras Ghareb Wind Energy in Egypt. The Project is a Non-Conventional Renewable Energy (NCRE) generation plant that will be developed in Ras Ghareb on the Gulf of Suez, Egypt, by an Independent Power Producer (IPP);
- biomass to electricity and also wastewater treatment system upgrade, both projects for Celulose Irani, in the south region of Brazil;
- landfill gas to electricity at Aguascalientes, Mexico;
- Small scale run-of-river hydroelectricity at SHP Saldanha, Rondônia state, north Brazil (Amazon Region);
- Small scale composting project in mid-western Brazil, the first composting CDM project to be registered in Brazil;
- Yuzaikou Small Hydropower Station, the first hydropower CDM project to be registered in China.

== The voluntary carbon market ==
In the voluntary market EcoSecurities develops carbon projects to sell on different markets, recognized by different standards, including the Voluntary Carbon Standard, the California Climate Action Registry standard, and The Gold Standard's Voluntary Emission Reduction standard. These are sold to organizations that have no regulatory obligation to offset their carbon emissions, but wish to do so on a voluntary basis, often as part of a carbon neutrality or corporate social responsibility programs.

Some of EcoSecurities' current and historic clients include Yahoo!, Fortune Conferences and NetJets Europe.

Voluntary emission reduction projects developed through EcoSecurities include wastewater methane avoidance in Brazil, methane capture for dairies in the United States, small hydroelectric power plant In Brazil, SPM Group pig farms in Thailand, fuel switch from fossil to renewable in Brazil, and waste management improvements in Chile.
