= Reed Hundt =

American attorney (born 1948)

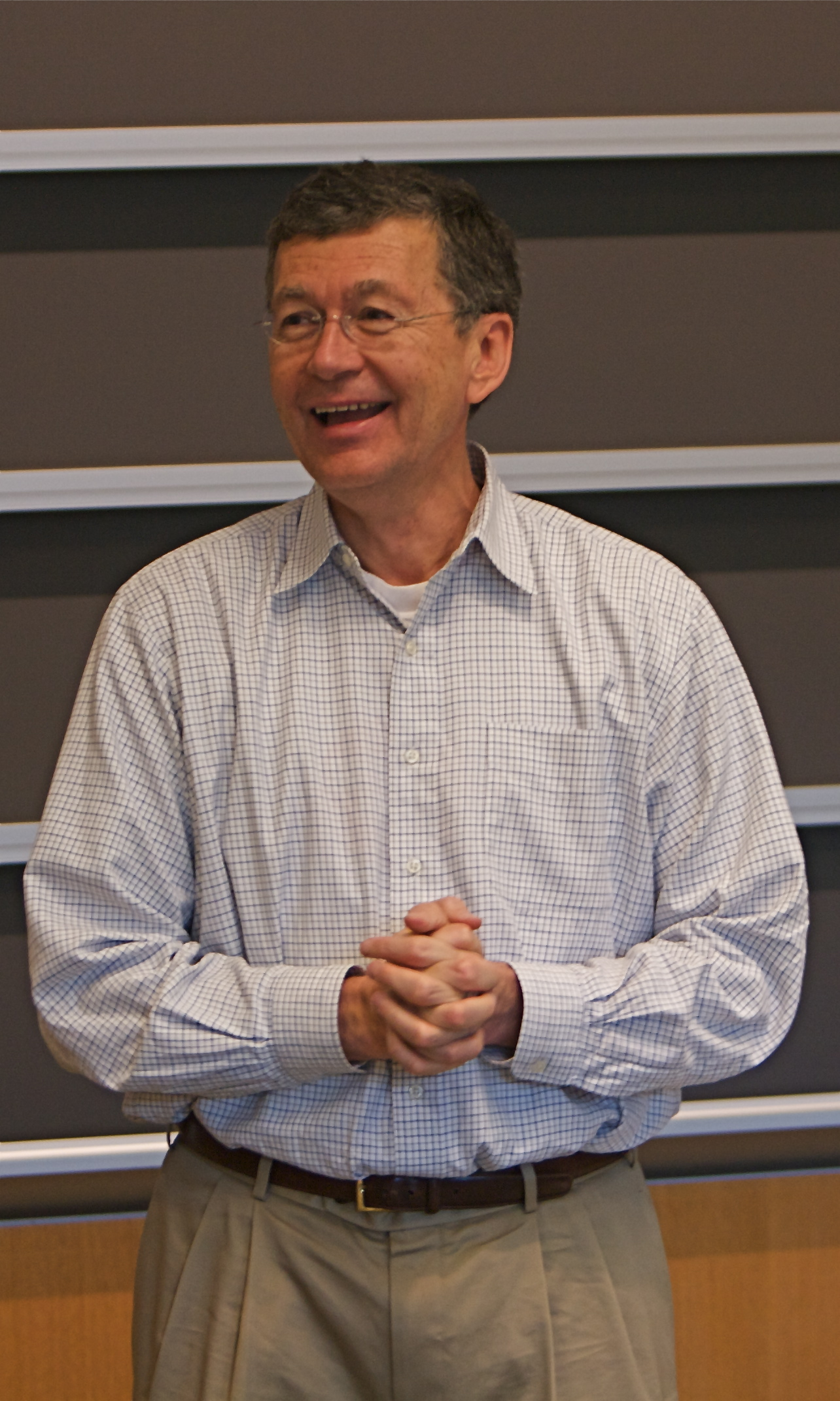
- Hundt in 2008

Chairman of the Federal Communications Commission
- In office November 29, 1993 – November 3, 1997
- President: Bill Clinton
- Preceded by: James Quello
- Succeeded by: William Kennard

Personal details
- Born: Reed Eric Hundt; March 3, 1948 (age 78) Ann Arbor, Michigan, U.S.
- Spouse: Betsy Katz
- Children: 3
- Education: Yale University (BA, JD)

Reed Eric Hundt (born March 3, 1948) is an American lawyer, author, and nonprofit executive. He is the co-founder, CEO, and board chair of Refounding America, a nonpartisan 501(c)(3) nonprofit that develops proposals for structural and functional changes to the federal government, and chairs Next Chapter, a 501(c)(4) political action fund. He was chairman of the Federal Communications Commission (FCC) from 1993 to 1997 under President Bill Clinton. After leaving government he worked as a corporate adviser and longtime board member of Intel, co-founded the Coalition for Green Capital, a leading advocate of green banks, and co-founded Making Every Vote Count, which advocates electing the president by national popular vote.

== Early life and education ==
Hundt was born in Ann Arbor, Michigan. He attended St. Albans School in Washington, D.C., graduating in 1965, where he became a lifelong friend of Al Gore. He studied history at Yale College, where he was executive editor of the Yale Daily News, and taught school for two years before entering Yale Law School. He received his B.A. in 1969 and his J.D. in 1974. At law school he was book review editor of the Yale Law Journal.

== Legal career ==
After clerking for Judge Harrison Lee Winter of the United States Court of Appeals for the Fourth Circuit, Hundt joined Latham & Watkins in Los Angeles. He was an associate and then partner at the firm from 1975 to 1993, moving to its Washington office in 1980. He specialized in antitrust litigation and represented a defendant in In re Fine Paper Antitrust Litigation, 685 F.2d 810 (3d Cir. 1982), which ended in a defense verdict in a multidistrict antitrust class action.

== FCC chairmanship (1993–1997) ==
Hundt served on the Clinton–Gore transition team in 1992–93 before Clinton nominated him to lead the FCC. He was sworn in by Vice President Gore on November 29, 1993.

Under Hundt, the FCC conducted the first spectrum auction in U.S. history, raising nearly $20 billion for the Treasury in its first two years of auction authority. His tenure also covered implementation of the Telecommunications Act of 1996. Hundt made children's issues and education central to his chairmanship. The advocacy group Public Knowledge identified the children's television programming rules issued under the Children's Television Act and the start of the transition to digital television as his defining achievements. He also championed the E-Rate program to connect schools and libraries to the Internet. When Hundt announced his departure, an editorial in The New York Times credited him with trying to lower cable rates, helping write rules to open local telephone markets, winning a computer-compatible digital television standard and requirements for children's educational programming, and securing rules for affordable telephone service for low-income people.

Internationally, the FCC under Hundt helped conclude the 1997 World Trade Organization telecommunications agreement. He created a task force on disability issues and established the agency's first presence on the Internet.

His approach drew opposition from parts of the broadcast and telecommunications industries; the trade publication RCR Wireless News called him arguably the most controversial, yet most constructive, chairman in the agency's history. Hundt announced his resignation in May 1997, and Clinton issued a statement praising his commitment to the public interest and to competition. He left office in November 1997 and was succeeded by William Kennard. His FCC records are held by Special Collections & Archives at the University of California, San Diego.

== Later career ==
=== Nonprofit work ===
Since 2025, Hundt has been chief executive of Refounding America, a nonprofit that develops proposals to change the structure and functioning of the federal government. In that role he has written on policy questions raised by artificial intelligence, including proposals for AI-focused legislation modeled on the Telecommunications Act of 1996.

Hundt also co-founded Making Every Vote Count, a nonpartisan nonprofit that advocates electing the president by national popular vote rather than through the Electoral College. The organization filed an amicus curiae brief in the 2020 Supreme Court faithless elector cases, Chiafalo v. Washington and Colorado Department of State v. Baca.

Hundt developed the green bank concept while serving on the Obama–Biden transition team in 2008–09 and co-founded the Coalition for Green Capital (CGC), which he led as CEO from 2010 to 2025. CGC helped design and launch the Connecticut Green Bank, the first state green bank in the United States, and Hundt sat on its board from 2011 to 2018. The Inflation Reduction Act of 2022 created the $27 billion Greenhouse Gas Reduction Fund, from which CGC was awarded $5 billion. CGC then opened what it described as the first U.S. national green bank, with 16 state and local green banks among its sub-recipients.

In March 2025 the Environmental Protection Agency under Administrator Lee Zeldin terminated the program's $20 billion in grant agreements. CGC sued Citibank, which held the funds, and expanded its suit to include the EPA and Zeldin. In August 2026 the D.C. Circuit restored an injunction against the terminations.

=== Corporate boards ===
After leaving the FCC, Hundt joined the boards of six telecommunications and technology companies. They included Allegiance Telecom, elected March 1998; Ascend Communications, July 1998; Novell, also July 1998, which he joined at the invitation of its chief executive, Eric Schmidt; NorthPoint Communications; and Phone.com (later Openwave), April 1999.

In 2001 Hundt was nominated to succeed Intel co-founder Gordon Moore on the company's board when Moore reached the board's mandatory retirement age. He was elected at the company's annual meeting in May 2001 and served for 19 years, until 2020. In 2025 he and other former Intel directors wrote in Fortune against proposals for TSMC to take over Intel's manufacturing plants.

=== Investment and advisory work ===
After leaving the FCC, Hundt was a principal of Charles Ross Partners, a telecommunications business-planning and policy consulting firm based in Bethesda, Maryland. From 1998 to 2008 he was a senior adviser on information industries at McKinsey & Company. He was a venture partner at Benchmark Capital (1998–2003), a special adviser to the Blackstone Group (2000–2007), a strategic adviser to China Telecom (2004–2009), and, from 2009, a senior adviser to the private equity firm GTCR. He later held senior advisory roles at the law firms Skadden Arps (2009–2015) and Covington & Burling (2015–2020).

=== Entrepreneurial ventures ===
Hundt co-founded several communications companies, including Sigma Networks, a metropolitan fiber provider started during the late-1990s optical networking boom. He also co-founded Core Express, a long-haul data network.

In 2007 he co-founded Frontline Wireless and served as its vice chairman. Backed by investors including Jim Barksdale and John Doerr of Kleiner Perkins, the company proposed building a nationwide open-access wireless broadband network that would be shared with public safety agencies, using spectrum from the 700 MHz auction. Former FCC chairman Mark Fowler later joined as a founding partner. The FCC adopted open-access conditions on part of the spectrum, as Frontline had urged. However, Frontline could not raise the $128 million upfront payment required to bid on the public-safety "D block" and closed in January 2008.

=== Aspen Institute and policy roles ===
From 1998 to 2006 Hundt was co-chairman of the Aspen Institute's Forum on Communications and Society, an annual gathering of communications executives and policymakers. In 2010–11 he chaired the Aspen Institute's IDEA Project, a forum of technology firms, government officials, and nongovernmental organizations on problems in the international information and communications technology sector.

His other policy roles include co-chairing an advisory committee to the Corporation for Public Broadcasting (2006); serving on a National Research Council committee on telecommunications research and development (2003–04); and serving on a Knight Foundation commission on local journalism (2008–09). On the Obama–Biden transition he served on the agency review teams and headed an economic review working group.

He has served on numerous nonprofit boards, including Public Knowledge (2002–2011), the United Negro College Fund (2009–2014), the Advanced Energy Economy Institute (2012–2015), and the advisory board of the Yale School of Management (1996–2014). He was also on the board of the Connecticut Green Bank from 2011 to 2018.

=== Teaching and fellowships ===
Hundt taught a seminar on communications and media cross-listed at Yale Law School and the Yale School of Management (1998–2002), and taught at Yale College and at Columbia's business and law schools. He has been a visiting lecturer in public policy at Stanford University, a visiting distinguished fellow at the German Marshall Fund of the United States, and a fellow of the Columbia Institute for Tele-Information and the Penn Wharton Public Policy Initiative.

== Awards ==
- Helen Keller Outstanding Public Service Award, American Foundation for the Blind, for creating the FCC's Disabilities Issues Task Force
- Public Service Award to Children, Parents' Choice Foundation
- Voice for Children Leadership Award (inaugural, 1998), Children Now
- Distinguished Service Award, National Association of Elementary School Principals and National Association of Secondary School Principals

== Personal life ==
Hundt is married to Betsy Katz. They have three children and five grandchildren, and live in Chevy Chase, Maryland, and Portola Valley, California.

== In popular culture ==
In the King of the Hill episode "Hillennium" (season 4), Dale Gribble refers to an op-ed by Hundt about the Year 2000 problem. In an episode of Animaniacs, Hundt is parodied as "Reef Blunt".

== Books ==
- You Say You Want a Revolution: A Story of Information Age Politics (Yale University Press, 2000)
- In China's Shadow: The Crisis of American Entrepreneurship (Yale University Press, 2006)
- The Politics of Abundance: How Technology Can Fix the Budget, Revive the American Dream, and Establish Obama's Legacy (with Blair Levin; Odyssey, 2012)
- Zero Hour: Time to Build the Clean Power Platform (Odyssey, 2013)
- A Crisis Wasted: Barack Obama's Defining Decisions (RosettaBooks, 2019)

Government offices
Preceded by James Quello	Chairman of the Federal Communications Commission; 1993–1997	Succeeded by William Kennard
