= BVRio Environmental Exchange =

Bolsa Verde do Rio de Janeiro (Rio de Janeiro’s Environmental Exchange) or BVRio is a not-for-profit association based in Rio de Janeiro, Brazil, created with the objective to create and promote the use of market mechanisms to facilitate compliance with Brazilian environmental laws.

== Foundation, partnerships and governance ==
BVRio was created in 2011 by social entrepreneurs Pedro Moura Costa and Mauricio Moura Costa in partnership with the Rio de Janeiro State Government and the Municipality of Rio de Janeiro. More recently, it has established collaboration agreements with the Brazilian Amazonian states of Pará, Amazonas, and Acre. Its board includes the participation of Funbio (Brazilian Fund for the Biodiversity), FBDS (Brazilian Foundation for Sustainable Development), CEBDS (the Brazilian chapter of the World Business Council for Sustainable Development), and high visibility citizens, including environmental economist Sérgio Besserman, as well as representatives from Rio de Janeiro’s State and Municipal governments.

== Sectors of activity ==
Launched in December 2011, BVRio initially focused on establishing partnerships with a wide range of stakeholders from government, NGOs and industry and to identify and prioritise sectors in which to focus its efforts. After consultation with these stakeholders, it became clear that BVRio should aim at operating at both the rural and urban environments, as well as at the industrial sector:

- With relation to the land use sector, it became clear that the current priority is to support compliance with the Brazilian Forest Law through the use of its mechanisms – Forest Legal Reserve Credits, Consolidation of Conservation Areas, and Reforestation Credits;
- In the urban environment, implementation of the National Solid Waste Legislation (PNRS) was identified as one of the priorities at that moment in time. For this sector, BVRio developed a system of Reverse Logistics Credits based on the collection and separation of waste conducted by low income independent waste collectors ("catadores"), creating an economic model for social inclusion and environmental benefits;
- With relation to the industrial sector, BVRio has worked closely with the Rio de Janeiro State Government to create a greenhouse gas (GHG) Cap & Trade system for the industries operating in the state. The infrastructure created is being used to run a GHG trading simulation with 20 Brazilian blue-chip companies, in partnership with the Getulio Vargas Foundation and the Companies for the Climate (Empresas pelo Clima) initiative, to serve as a pilot for a planned federal GHG Cap & Trade scheme to be developed at a later stage;
- More recently, BVRio has focused on promoting the trading of “responsible commodities”, i.e., legal and/or sustainably produced forest and agricultural products.

At the end of its first year, BVRio launched a trading platform to support the market of Forest Reserve Credits for compliance with the Brazilian Forest Law. Today, the exchange has the participation of more than 3000 participants and over 3 million ha of rural properties offering credits throughout Brazil. With relation to the reverse logistics system, the FRC Market already counts with the participation of more than 7,000 waste collectors, represented through 150 cooperatives distributed throughout the country. The sale of Reverse Logistics credits greatly increased the income of these waste collectors (estimated at ca. 50%), generating positive social and environmental benefits.

== Prizes and awards ==
In 2003 BVRio won the Katerva Award in the Economics category and in 2014 BVRio was nominated a "Climate Action Leader" by the R20 Regions of Climate Action as an acknowledgment for BVRio's work on the Green Finance Mechanism. Additionally, it received the Madeira Awards in 2014, and was shortlisted for awards from Yale University and UNDP in 2013/2014.
