= Blair Levin =

American lawyer

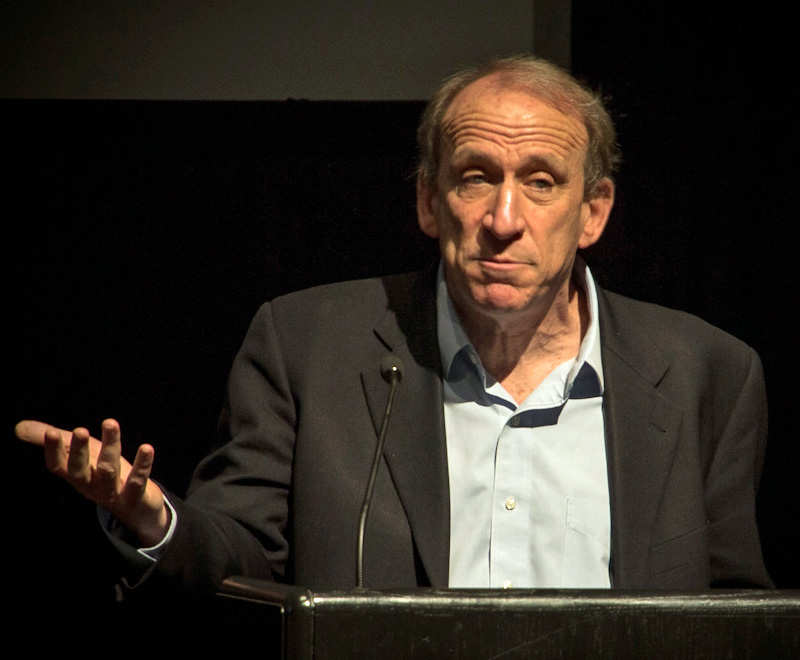

Personal details
- Born: January 23, 1954 (age 71)
- Political party: Democratic
- Education: Yale University (BA, JD)

Blair Steven Levin is an American lawyer formerly with the Federal Communications Commission, who served as the executive director of the National Broadband Plan from 2009 to 2010. During the presidency of Bill Clinton he was chief of staff to FCC chairman Reed Hundt from 1993 to 1997.

From 2001 through 2008, he worked as a policy analyst for Legg Mason and then Stifel Nicolaus. Barron's Magazine noted that as an analyst, Levin “has always been on top of developing trends and policy shifts in media and telecommunications … and has proved visionary in getting out in front of many of today’s headline making events.”

In 2008, he co-chaired the technology, innovation and government reform transition team for President-elect Barack Obama and subsequently served as the executive director for the effort that produced the National Broadband Plan. FCC Chairman Tom Wheeler has noted that as to Levin's role in broadband policy, “no one's done more to advance broadband expansion and competition through the vision of National Broadband Plan and Gig.U."

He has spoken at many conferences on telecommunications policy. Along with former FCC Chairman Reed Hundt, Levin authored The Politics of Abundance: How Technology Can Fix the Budget, Revive the American Dream, and Establish Obama's Legacy. He has received a number of awards for his work on broadband including “Visionary of the Year” from Computers for Youth and “Community Broadband Visionary of the Year” from the National Association of Telecommunications Officers and Advisors.

He is now a non-resident fellow at the Metropolitan Policy Project of the Brookings Institution. He also is the executive director of the Gig.U project, a consortium of research university communities seeking to accelerate the deployment of next generation networks in the United States. The project has led to a number of communities obtaining next generation networks.

He worked on the 1982 campaign of Mayor Tom Bradley's unsuccessful run for California governor and disputes the so-called Bradley Effect. From 1984 through 1993, he was a lawyer with Parker Poe Adams & Bernstein in Raleigh, North Carolina.

He graduated summa cum laude from Yale College and is a graduate of Yale Law School.
