= Ben Caldecott =

- Born: 1985 (age 40–41); London, England

Academic background
- Education: SOAS, University of London; Selwyn College, University of Cambridge; Brasenose College, University of Oxford (DPhil)

Academic work
- Discipline: Sustainable finance, economic geography
- Institutions: University of Oxford
- Website: www.smithschool.ox.ac.uk/person/dr-ben-caldecott

Ben Caldecott (born 1985) is a British academic working in sustainable finance. He is the founding director of the Oxford Sustainable Finance Group at the University of Oxford Smith School of Enterprise and the Environment and the Associate Professor of Sustainable Finance, a post endowed in 2020 with funds from the Swiss banking group Lombard Odier and the first endowed professorship in the field at a major research university. He is a Supernumerary Fellow at Oriel College, Oxford.

In 2022, Apolitical named Caldecott one of the "100 Most Influential People in Climate Policy". The ENDS Report included him on its UK Power List of environmental professionals the same year.

== Education and early career ==
Caldecott was born in London to a Malaysian-Chinese mother and an English-South African father, and spent part of his early childhood in Sarawak and Nigeria before the family returned to Cambridge. He read economics at the School of Oriental and African Studies, University of London, and at Selwyn College, University of Cambridge, specialising in development and China. He holds a doctorate in economic geography from Brasenose College, University of Oxford. He was included in the 2013 edition of Who's Who, at the time the youngest non-sportsperson admitted on merit.

Before joining Oxford, Caldecott was a Vice President at Climate Change Capital, an investment bank focused on carbon and clean energy markets, and previously worked at Bloomberg New Energy Finance and the think tank Policy Exchange. He held civil service secondments at the Department of Energy and Climate Change and the Department for Environment, Food and Rural Affairs.

== Research ==
Caldecott's research focuses on stranded assets, spatial finance, and climate-related financial risk. Stranded assets are assets that suffer unanticipated or premature devaluation due to environment-related factors such as climate policy, technological change, or social pressure. According to a 2023 profile in Tagesspiegel, Caldecott was among the first to warn central banks, including the Bank of England, about the financial stability implications of stranded assets, initially meeting scepticism before the concept entered mainstream supervisory practice. A REF 2021 impact case study submitted by the University of Oxford, titled "Embedding Understanding and Governing Climate-related Risks at the Bank of England", documented how his research influenced the Bank's acknowledgement and governance of climate-related risks from 2014 onwards, including its seminal 2015 report on climate change and the UK insurance sector. He was an Academic Visitor at the Bank of England from 2014 to 2019. In 2011, he argued in The Guardian that high-carbon investment could become a systemic risk comparable to the sub-prime crisis.

He initiated the Spatial Finance Initiative, which applies geospatial data and remote sensing to financial analysis, and co-founded the Global Research Alliance for Sustainable Finance and Investment (GRASFI), an alliance of research universities which he co-chaired from 2017 to 2023. He also co-founded the Commonwealth Climate and Law Initiative, which examined directors' legal duties in relation to climate risk.

In 2022, Caldecott wrote in the Financial Times that financial institutions and ESG data providers were seeking to influence academic research findings before publication, and called for regulatory action to protect academic freedom in the field.

== Policy work ==
From 2022 to 2024, Caldecott co-headed the Secretariat of the Transition Plan Taskforce (TPT), established by HM Treasury at COP26 to develop a disclosure framework for corporate climate transition plans. In 2024, the IFRS Foundation assumed responsibility for the TPT's materials, integrating them into guidance for IFRS S2.

He serves as Coordinating Lead Author for finance in the Intergovernmental Panel on Climate Change Seventh Assessment Report (Working Group III). From 2019 to 2021, he was seconded to the Cabinet Office as the COP26 Strategy Advisor for Finance. In a 2023 interview with Tagesspiegel, Caldecott described the COP26 finance outcome as a partial failure, saying that missteps around the Glasgow Financial Alliance for Net Zero could have been avoided.

He served on the US Commodity Futures Trading Commission Climate-Related Market Risk Subcommittee (2019–2022), the UK Climate Change Committee's Adaptation Committee (2022–2025), and the Export Guarantees Advisory Council of UK Export Finance (2020–2026).

== Other roles ==
Caldecott holds advisory positions with several financial institutions. He is a trustee of the Royal Society for the Protection of Birds and was previously a trustee of the Green Alliance (2010–2022). He was a member of the board of the Conservative Environment Network.

In August 2023, the RSPB posted on X calling Prime Minister Rishi Sunak and two other ministers "liars" over environmental policy. Caldecott publicly criticised the post, and the charity subsequently apologised; the Charity Commission opened a compliance case, calling the RSPB's post a "serious mistake". Writing in The Guardian, George Monbiot questioned the appropriateness of Caldecott's trusteeship given his former position at Policy Exchange, whose founding chair was Michael Gove, one of the ministers the RSPB had criticised.

== Selected publications ==
- Hale, T.; et al. (2024). "Regulating Net Zero: From Groundswell to Ground Rules". Nature Climate Change. 14: 306–308.
- Walton, S.; Mehrabi, Z.; Fanzo, J.; Caldecott, Ben (2025). "Asset stranding could open new pathways to food systems transformation". Nature Food. 6: 440–445.
- Caldecott, Ben; et al. (2021). "Stranded Assets: Environmental Drivers, Societal Challenges, and Supervisory Responses". Annual Review of Environment and Resources. 46: 417–447. doi:10.1146/annurev-environ-012220-101430.
- Pfeiffer, A.; Hepburn, C.; Vogt-Schilb, A.; Caldecott, Ben (2018). "Committed emissions from existing and planned power plants and asset stranding required to meet the Paris Agreement". Environmental Research Letters. 13.
- Hickey, C.; et al. (2021). "Can European electric utilities manage asset impairments arising from net zero carbon targets?". Journal of Corporate Finance. 70.
- Caldecott, Ben (ed.) (2018). Stranded Assets and the Environment: Risk, Resilience and Opportunity. Routledge. ISBN 978-0-367-45897-3.
