= Halford Mackinder Professor of Geography =

Endowed chair at Oxford University

The Halford Mackinder Professor of Geography was established in 1971 is an endowed chair attached to St Peter's College of the University of Oxford. In February 2025 the chair title was renamed to 1971 Professor of Geography.

Originally, the post was named after Sir Halford Mackinder, the first Reader in the Department of Geography in Oxford, and an important figure in the early years of Geography as an academic subject in the United Kingdom.

Chair appointments:

- John House (1974–1984)
- Abeyance (1984–1986)
- David Harvey (1987–1995)
- Gordon L. Clark (1995–2013)
- Danny Dorling (2013–present)
