= Dieter Helm =

British economist and academic (born 1956)

Sir Dieter Helm CBE
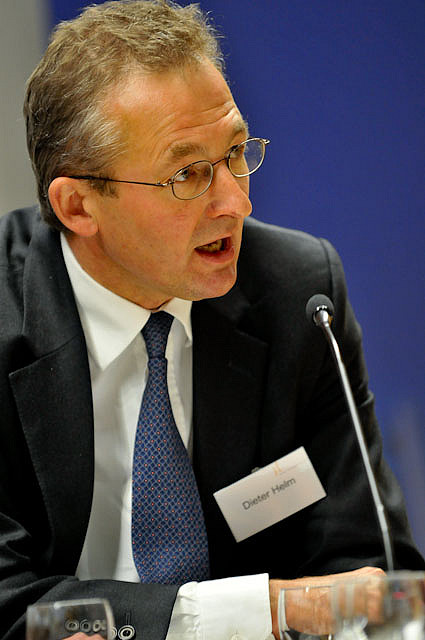
- Helm at the Policy Network Politics of Climate Change conference in 2009
- Born: 11 November 1956 (age 69)

Academic work
- Discipline: Economics
- Sub-discipline: Energy Policy
- Institutions: New College, Oxford; Blavatnik School of Government, University of Oxford; Smith School of Enterprise and the Environment, University of Oxford

Sir Dieter Robin Helm CBE (born 11 November 1956) is a British economist and Professor of Economic Policy at the University of Oxford.

== Early life ==
The son of Fritz W. Helm and his wife Ruth Rigby, Helm was born and brought up in Essex. His father was a German prisoner-of-war originally from Saxony, interned in East Anglia. With his home under Russian occupation, at the end of the war he stayed where he was, married an Englishwoman, and launched a mushroom farm in Essex.

He was educated at Brasenose College, Oxford, graduating BA in philosophy, politics and economics in 1978, Nuffield College, Oxford (MPhil, 1981), and New College, Oxford (DPhil in Economics, 1984).

== Career ==
Helm was a Junior Research Fellow at New College, Oxford, from 1981 to 1983, then a Fellow in Economics at Lady Margaret Hall from 1985 to 1988. He was elected as a Fellow of New College in 1988 and was appointed as the university's Professor of Energy Policy in 1990, a post he held until 2007, when he became Professor of Economic Policy at Oxford. Helm is also a Tutor in Economics at New College.

He was a Member of the Ministerial Task Force on Sustainable Development, 2003–2005; Sustainable Energy Policy Advisory Board, 2003–2007; Energy Advisory Panel of the Department of Trade and Industry, 2004–2007, and the Economics Advisory Group to the Secretary of State for Energy and Climate Change, also chairing the Natural Capital Committee.

Helm founded Oxford Economic Research Associates Ltd in 1982 and was director of it until 2005; he was also a director of Aurora Energy Research Ltd from 2013 to 2020 and has been a director of Natural Capital Resources Ltd since 2020.

His research interests include energy, utilities, and the environment.

=== The Carbon Crunch ===
In his book The Carbon Crunch (2012) and in print media, Dieter Helm criticised efforts to reduce greenhouse gas emissions through current regulation and government intervention, and the deployment of renewable energy, particularly wind power.

He recommended establishing a carbon tax and carbon border tax, increased funding for research and development, and an increased use of gas for electricity generation to substitute coal and to act as a bridge to new technologies.

=== Net Zero ===
In 2021 his book Net Zero was shortlisted for the Wainwright Prize in the Global Conservation Writing category.

== Honours ==
- Commander of the Order of the British Empire, 2003
- Knight Bachelor, 2021 New Year Honours, for services to the environment, energy and utilities policy.

== Bibliography ==
=== Books ===
As author

- Legacy: How to Build the Sustainable Economy (October 2023), Cambridge University Press, ISBN 9781009449212.
- Net Zero: How We Stop Causing Climate Change (September 2020), HarperCollins, ISBN 9780008404468.
- Green and Prosperous Land (March 2019), William Collins, ISBN 978-0008304478.
- Burn Out: The Endgame for Fossil Fuels (2018), Yale University Press, ISBN 9780300234480.
- Burn Out: The Endgame for Fossil Fuels (March 2017), Yale University Press, ISBN 9780300225624.
- Natural Capital: Valuing the Planet (May 2015), Yale University Press, ISBN 978-0300210989.
- The Carbon Crunch: How We're Getting Climate Change Wrong – and How to Fix it (September 2012), Yale University Press, ISBN 978-0300186598.
- Energy, the State, and the Market: British Energy Policy since 1979 (February 2004), revised edition, Oxford University Press, ISBN 978-0199270743.

As editor

- The Economics and Politics of Climate Change (October 2009), with Cameron Hepburn, ISBN 978-0199573288.
- The New Energy Paradigm (April 2007), ISBN 978-0199229703.
- Climate Change Policy (May 2005), ISBN 978-0199281466.
- Environmental Policy: Objectives, Instruments, and Implementation (November 2000), ISBN 978-0199241361.
- Competition in Regulated Industries (April 1998), with Tim Jenkinson, ISBN 978-0198292524.
- British Utility Regulation: Principles, Experience and Reform (September 1995), ISBN 978-1873482278.
- The Economic Borders of the State (December 1990), ISBN 978-0198286066.
- The Market for Energy (May 1989), with John Kay and David Thompson, ISBN 978-0198286080.

=== Selected peer-reviewed articles ===
- Helm, D., 2008. Climate-change policy: why has so little been achieved?. Oxford Review of Economic Policy, 24(2), pp. 211–238. JSTOR: 23606642; doi: 10.1093/oxrep/grn014
- Helm, D., 2005. The assessment: the new energy paradigm. Oxford Review of Economic Policy, 21(1), pp. 1–18. JSTOR: 23606814; doi: 10.1093/oxrep/gri001
- Helm, D., 2002. Energy policy: security of supply, sustainability and competition. Energy policy, 30(3), pp. 173–184. doi: 10.1016/S0301-4215(01)00141-0

== See also ==
- Global warming
- Climate change mitigation
- Economics of global warming
- Energy policy of the United Kingdom
- Environmental economics
