= Smith School of Enterprise and the Environment =

Research centre of Oxford University

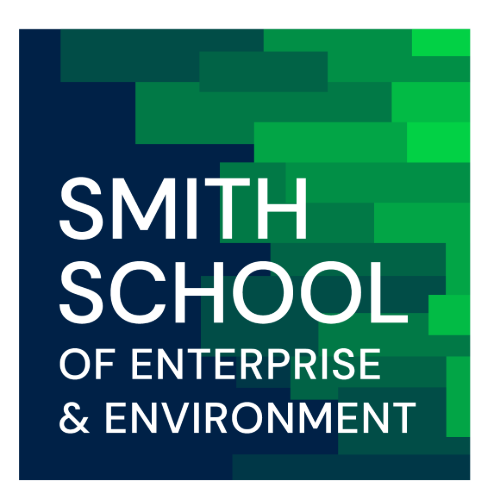
- Smith School logo
- Formation: 2008
- Founder: Sir Martin Smith and Lady Smith
- Purpose: Education and Research
- Location: Oxford, United Kingdom
- Director: Professor Mette Morsing
- Parent organization: University of Oxford
- Website: www.smithschool.ox.ac.uk

The Smith School of Enterprise and the Environment (also known as the Oxford Smith School) is an interdisciplinary research centre of the University of Oxford that focuses on teaching research, and engagement with businesses and enterprises for long term environmental sustainability. The Oxford Smith School was established with the vision of a net-zero emissions future alongside achieving the Sustainable Development Goals, supported by a sustainable global economic and financial system. The school has a broad profile of research, teaching, enterprise engagement, and partnerships to support this vision.

The Smith School is part of the School of Geography and the Environment, University of Oxford.

Much of the Oxford Smith School’s work is multi-disciplinary and draws on a wide range of collaborators across Oxford University. Several academic staff hold joint appointments or are affiliated with other parts of the university including the School of Geography and Environment, the Saïd Business School, the Institute of New Economic Thinking, the Department of Biology, the Department of Economics, the Faculty of Law, and the Oxford Martin School.

== History ==
The Oxford Smith School was founded through a benefaction from the Smith Family Educational Foundation and officially opened in 2008. From 2008 to 2012, Professor Sir David King, the then outgoing Chief Scientific Adviser to the UK Government and Head of the Government Office for Science, served as the founding director of the Smith School, followed by Professor Gordon Clark from January 2013 to October 2018, a pioneer of research showing how sustainability can drive financial outperformance, and Professor of climate economics Cameron Hepburn from October 2018 – October 2023. The current director is Professor Mette Morsing, formerly of the UN Global Compact – the world's largest corporate sustainability and corporate social responsibility initiative.

== Research ==
The Smith School conducts research in various disciplines including finance, enterprise, economics, and law, with a collective focus on thinking about public and private sector decision-making and sustainable development. Particular research focuses within these disciplines include biodiversity, climate, energy, food, regenerative economy, and water.

A critical contribution of the Oxford Smith School has been to frame the narrative of climate change and environmental concerns into the language of risk for enterprises and governments. Concepts such as stranded assets developed by Dr Ben Caldecott help make these risks concrete and guide sustainable finance and climate-aware decision-making across public and private sector entities.

The School led the development of the Oxford Offsetting Principles, which are considered industry gold-standard and contributes to global understanding of net zero, the clean energy transition, and sustainable cooling.

During the Covid-19 crisis the Smith School engaged heavily with topics of Green Economic Recovery, co-leading the Oxford University Economic Recovery Project which has engaged over 20 governments and international institutions such as the IMF, the WTO, the World Bank and the United Nations Environment Programme.

The School’s Sustainable Law Programme has been engaged by leading environmental lawsuits such as Lliuya v RWE AG to test legal responses to climate change.

Since 2015, the REACH programme has been working with government, UNICEF, academic institutions, private sector and civil society partners to improve water security for 10 million people in Africa and Asia.

== Education ==
The Smith School offers a range of undergraduate and graduate courses in the School of Geography and the Environment, which was the highest-ranked Geography department in the world in 2023 by QS World University Rankings and Times Higher Education. Its MSc course in Sustainability, Enterprise, and Environment was one of the most applied-to graduate course at the University of Oxford in 2021. The School also offers executive education programs across online and in-person formats on a variety of topics relevant to sustainability leadership and the net-zero transition.

== Recognition ==
In 2024, the Smith School’s excellence was recognised through the following awards:

- MSc Course Director, Laurence Wainwright won the Teaching Excellence Award from the University of Oxford, given for his “approach to creating an atmosphere where students can thrive..resulting in exceptional levels of group cohesion and camaraderie”.
- Two Smith School groups won a Vice Chancellor’s award this year: Alexis McGivern and team won the Environment and Sustainability category for the Global Youth Climate Training Programme which educated 4,500 activists under the age of 35. Rob Hope and team won the Research Engagement category for their work in REACH/ Water Security across Ethiopia, Kenya and Bangladesh over the past 8 years. This award is Oxford’s highest award for excellence and recognises groundbreaking, innovative, and impactful work stemming from academia.

== World Forum ==
The Smith School hosts the annual ‘Oxford World Forum’, which brings together leaders, entrepreneurs, and civil society representatives to explore pathways for climate action. Previous speakers include Bill Clinton, Mikhail Gorbachev, Mohamed Nasheed, Ellen MacArthur, Al Gore, and Steven Chu.

== Notable people ==
Academics at the Smith School include Cameron Hepburn, Ben Caldecott, Doyne Farmer, Radhika Khosla, and Sam Fankhauser.

The Smith School runs ‘Business Fellows’ and ‘Advisory Board’ programmes which bring together leading thinkers from the business world who are helping to shape their company and industry response to the challenges of achieving net zero emissions and sustainable development goals. Past and present members include:

- John Beddington
- Pedro Moura Costa
- Juliet Davenport
- Jamshyd Godrej
- Connie Hedegaard
- André Hoffmann
- John Hood
- Uday Khemka
- Adam Parr
- Cressida Pollock
- Claire Perry O'Neill
- David Scrymgeour
- David Shukman
