= Pedro Moura Costa =

Brazilian businessman

- Born: 1963 (age 62–63); Brazil
- Occupations: Entrepreneur, Environmental Finance Specialist

Pedro Moura Costa (born 1963, in Brazil) is an entrepreneur involved in environmental finance with a focus on the international efforts for climate change mitigation and greenhouse gas (GHG) emission reductions. Of particular relevance, he was the founder and President of EcoSecurities Group Plc., one of the leading project developers for the international carbon markets, co-founder of "Sustainable Investment Management", a pioneering blended finance firm, and has written widely about the policy and science of climate change mitigation, including contributions to the Intergovernmental Panel on Climate Change (IPCC) reports.

== Role in Pre-Kyoto carbon emission reduction initiatives ==
Moura Costa's involvement with the carbon emission reduction sector started in 1991, with the development of two of the first carbon forestry projects worldwide, namely the Innoprise-Face Foundation Rainforest Rehabilitation Project and the Innoprise-New England Power Reduced Impact Logging Project, both in Sabah, Malaysia. Moura Costa served as Senior Project Officer for Innoprise between 1991 and 1995, and was involved in the development and management of both these projects.

While the concept of ‘joint implementation’ of greenhouse gas (GHG) emission reduction projects (also called "carbon offset projects") was launched at the United Nations Conference on Environment and Development (UNCED, “the Earth Summit”), the early carbon offset projects of the 1990s suffered from a lack of specialised services to support them. One service of particular importance is that of independent verification of carbon offsets, as offsets are dependent on proving a shift of behaviour in relation to a baseline (this shift is referred to as "additionality", in the sector).

Moura Costa identified the absence of independent verification services as one of the limiting factors to the growth of the carbon market at that time, and in 1996 he developed the first carbon offset verification service worldwide, which was licensed to the Swiss certification company SGS (Société Générale de Surveillance). The first client for this certification service was the Costa Rican National GHG Mitigation Programme, developed by OCIC (Costa Rican Office on Joint Implementation). After the launch of the Kyoto Protocol (see below), independent certification of carbon emission reductions became a mandatory requirement under the rules of the Clean Development Mechanism (i.e., the carbon credits of this mechanism are called CERs, meaning Certified Emission Reductions).

To pursue the work with SGS and the government of Costa Rica, Moura Costa created EcoSecurities, a company specialised in the development of greenhouse gas mitigation projects.

== Contribution to the CDM and carbon trading ==
EcoSecurities was founded in January 1997 by Moura Costa and environmental economist Marc Stuart to provide "environmental finance solutions". Twelve months later, in December 1997 the Kyoto Protocol was signed creating binding commitments for reductions in greenhouse gas emissions among industrialised countries. It also created the Flexibility Mechanisms, Joint Implementation and the Clean Development Mechanism (CDM), which enabled the creation and use of carbon credits from greenhouse gas emission reduction projects. Carbon trading gradually evolved from a niche environmental activity to becoming a global market that 2010 mobilised over €120 billion, including trades under the European Union Emissions Trading Scheme and the UN flexibility mechanisms.

As carbon markets evolved, Moura Costa was particularly interested in making investors and analysts incorporate the impact of greenhouse gas emissions on company valuations. In 1999, he coordinated the development of the carbon trading component of Australian Plantation Timber, a forestry investment fund, the first time ‘carbon value’ was included in an investment prospectus. Gradually, investor awareness of climate and environmental issues increased, and as a result of that (and contributing to this trend), a series of companies in the carbon market sector floated on stock exchanges in 2004–2006.

The adoption of binding emission reduction commitments by the Kyoto Protocol created a positive environment for more carbon offset project development companies to be created worldwide. Benefitting from an early mover advantage, EcoSecurities rapidly expanded and established a significant market share. In December 2005, EcoSecurities listed on the London Stock Exchange (AIM) raising capital for its expansion, one of the first companies in this sector to be listed. As President and COO, Moura Costa coordinated the company's expansion, from 30 to 300 employees, establishing the firm's offices in 28 countries worldwide. In 2007, the company raised a second round of capital from the stock markets, and attracted Credit Suisse as a strategic partner.

During the period he was involved with EcoSecurities, from 1997 to 2009, the company developed more than 450 CDM projects in over 40 countries and, among them, used over 20 different technologies. The company was a pioneer in many aspects of the sector, including the development of the first CDM project methodology, i.e., the first project registered by the NovaGerar landfill project in Brazil, and the first project to receive CERs (a small-hydro project in Honduras). With a view to broadening its reach, he led the company to develop new divisions focused on specialised technologies related to greenhouse gas abatement. Among them, EcoMethane, a division specialised in the creation of projects for the collection and destruction of methane from landfill sites (managed by David Antonioli, who later became CEO of Verra), and a division for the development of N2O abatement projects, focusing on nitric acid factories. Moura Costa was also the fund manager of the EcoSecurities-Standard Bank Carbon Facility, which invested in projects on behalf of the Government of Denmark and, subsequently, developed similar funds on behalf of the governments of Austria and Japan.

In 2007, Moura Costa organised the international conference Rio+15, to celebrate 15 years of the UN Conference on Environment and Development (the ‘Earth Summit’). The conference had the participation of over 200 international participants, including introductions by Maurice Strong (organiser of the Earth Summit) and former Brazilian president Fernando Henrique Cardoso, and received wide media coverage.

In April 2009, Moura Costa resigned from EcoSecurities to conduct a take-over bid to acquire control of the company, together with Brazilian investment group BTG. This resulted in an international competition for the acquisition of the company

== Philanthropic activities: Creation of BVRio Environmental Exchange in Brazil ==
After the sale of EcoSecurities, Pedro devoted his time and networks to promoting environmental solutions on a philanthropic basis.

In 2011, Pedro and his brother Mauricio Moura Costa, an environmental lawyer, founded BVRio Environmental Exchange (Bolsa Verde do Rio de Janeiro), an organisation based in Rio de Janeiro, Brazil, with the mission to develop market mechanisms to facilitate compliance with environmental laws. BVRio was developed in partnership with the Rio de Janeiro State Government, and the Municipality of Rio de Janeiro and its board includes the participation of Funbio (Brazilian Fund for the Biodiversity), FBDS (Brazilian Foundation for Sustainable Development), and CEBDS (the Brazilian chapter of the World Business Council for Sustainable Development).

Through BVRio, Pedro has helped to create markets for different environmental assets including Forest Legal Reserve Credits, Consolidation of Conservation Areas, and Reforestation Credits to support compliance with the new Brazilian Forest Law; a traceable responsible commodities platform to promote the sourcing of legal and/or sustainably produced forest and agricultural products.; and Reverse Logistics Credits to support the implementation of the Brazilian National Solid Waste Legislation; This was the first waste recycling credit scheme worldwide, which led to the creation of over 50 plastic credit schemes worldwide and recognition of this mechanism in the forthcoming UN Global Plastics Treaty. BVRio was also involved in creation of Verra’s Plastic Waste Reduction Standard and.

In recognition for its role in developing innovative mechanisms for environmental objectives, BVRio won the 2013 Katerva Awards and in 2014 BVRio was nominated a "Climate Action Leader" by the R20 Regions of Climate Action.

== Spinoffs of BVRio: Sustainable Investment Management ==
As the concepts created by BVRio required investment to gain scale, In 2017, Pedro and Mauricio Moura Costa created Sustainable Investment Management (SIM), a boutique investment vehicle to manage these different initiatives. The first fund created by SIM is the, a green bond fund to provide financial incentives to soy farmers that commit to zero deforestation in the Brazilian Cerrado. The RCF attracted the interest of corporate, public and financial investors, and received different awards. Other initiatives include SIMFlor, Circular Action Hub, and Kolekt.

== Acquisition of EcoSecurities ==
In 2018, Pedro joined forces with Pablo Fernandez, a former employee of Ecosecurities, to acquire the company back from Swiss trading house Mercuria. Since then, Ecosecurities started a growth phase, to participate in the new phase of carbon markets, voluntary carbon markets and nature based solutions. In 2021, it attracted investment from Hartree, and in 2023 the Korean SK group took a minority stake in the firm.

== Contribution to environmental policy and science ==
Dr Moura Costa has a PhD from University of London and has published widely in the subjects of environmental finance, carbon trading, GHG mitigation science and forestry. In particular, many of his articles have focused on scientific aspects of the design of the Clean Development Mechanism, such as discussions on leakage, additionality, monitoring and verification, permanence, and carbon forestry. He was also a Lead Author to different IPCC reports, including the IPCC Special Report on Land Use, Land-Use Change and Forestry recognised by the joint award of the 2007 Nobel Peace Prize). He has also written on forestry, circular economy, sustainable agriculture, and innovative financial mechanisms for the environment.

His work has been covered widely by the international media, including cover features in the Wall Street Journal, Director Magazine, Future Fuels, articles in Fortune Magazine, Sunday Times, Forbes, Estado de São Paulo, and TV and radio interviews with TV Globo, BBC and others. Moura Costa is regular speaker in conferences and universities, promoting innovative solutions for environmental challenges, including climate change mitigation and adaptation, pollution control, and forest protection. Between 1995 and 2005 he frequently lectured at Oxford University and Imperial College of London, and since 2023 he has been a Business Fellow of the Smith School of Enterprise and the Environment at the University of Oxford.

Pedro Moura Costa is a member of the Steering Committee of the Voluntary Carbon Markets Integrity initiative (VCMI), Honorary Fellow of the International Emissions Trading Association (IETA), member of the, Fellow of Forest Trends, a director of BVRio Institute, Sustainable Investment Management (SIM), and Oxford Climate Policy, and non-executive director of ecosecurities Holdings S.A., Circular Action BV, and Amazon-based think tank Imazon. Moura Costa was formerly a member of the Steering Committee of the, member of the advisory boards of the ClimateBonds Initiative,[38] the Brazilian Rural Society (Conselho de Meio Ambiente, Sociedade Rural Brasileira), the Businesses for Climate (Empresas pelo Clima) initiative, the International Institute for Sustainable Development (IISD), Lestari Capital, and of Conselho da Cidade do Rio de Janeiro (Rio de Janeiro city’s Board of Citizens).
