= Green Alliance =

Green Alliance may refer to:

- Green Alliance (think tank), a British think tank
- Green Alliance (Colombia), a political party
- Green Alliance (Ireland), former name of the Green Party in the Republic of Ireland and Northern Ireland
- Green Alliance (Russia), a political party from 2012 to 2019
- Green Alliance (Spain), an eco-socialist political party created in 2021

== See also ==
- Green Algeria Alliance, an Islamist coalition of political parties in 2012
