= Gordon L. Clark =

Australian economic geographer and economist

Gordon L. Clark FBA FAcSS
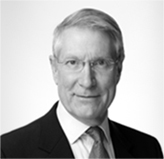
- Professor Gordon L. Clark
- Born: Gordon Leslie Clark; September 10, 1950 (age 76)
- Occupations: Geographer, economist, academic, consultant
- Years active: 1977-present
- Title: Senior Consultant and Emeritus Professor
- Board member of: Avida International (2015-), Watermarq Limited, IP Group, FinOptSys, Oxford Earth Observation (2018-2024), Social Impact Capital (2019-),

Academic background
- Education: Ph.D., DSc (Oxon)
- Alma mater: McMaster University
- Thesis: Regional unemployment and policy analysis: geographical study of Canadian federal unemployment policy (1978)
- Academic advisors: Michael Dear, Leslie J. King, and Atif Kubursi

Academic work
- Discipline: Geography, economics
- Sub-discipline: Environmental geography, economic geography
- Institutions: Oxford's Smith School
- Main interests: The behaviour of investors, long-term sustainable investment, the design of investment institutions, corporate governance, institutional decision-making
- Notable works: Pension fund capitalism (2000); The Oxford handbook of economic geography (2003)

Gordon Leslie Clark, FBA FAcSS (born September 10, 1950) is an Australian economic geographer, academic, and consultant. He is former Executive Director of the Smith School of Enterprise and the Environment, University of Oxford (2013–2018) with cross appointments in the Saïd Business School and the School of Geography and the Environment. Clark's latest work focuses on the geographical structure and performance of financial markets and organisations. He wrote and co-wrote multiple books in these subjects, including The Geography of Finance (OUP 2007), (Note: With Dariusz Wójcik) Sovereign Wealth Funds (Princeton 2012), (Note: With Adam Dixon and Ashby Monk) and Institutional Investors in Global Markets (OUP 2017). (Note: With Ashby Monk)

== Biography ==
=== Early life and education ===
Clark has a BEcon and MA in Geography from Monash University, (Note: Thesis: Macro economic planning and regional impact : a Victorian regional analysis, 1953-1974., 1975, supervised by John McKay.) a DSc and an MA in Economic Geography from Oxford, (Note: Thesis: The economic landscape of modern capitalism: capital and the social relations of production, 2002.) and a PhD in Economic Geography from McMaster University.

=== Academia ===
Clark's first academic post was in the Department of City and Regional Planning at Harvard Graduate School of Design. He then held an appointments at Harvard's John F. Kennedy School of Government, the University of Chicago, Carnegie Mellon's Heinz School and Monash University (1989–1995).

Having been the Halford Mackinder Professor of Geography and Head of the School of Geography and the Environment at Oxford, he was appointed Executive Director of the Smith School in 2012. He has been an advisor to companies on issues such as long-term environmental performance. With Zurich Insurance, he led a team of Oxford academics on a six year-long consultation on individual behavior and risk and uncertainty in household decision-making. Clark holds a Professorial Fellowship at St Edmund Hall, Oxford, was the Sir Louis Matheson Distinguished Visiting Professor at Monash University's Faculty of Business and Economics and was a visiting professor at Stanford University.

Clark sits on the advisory board of Avida International, and has been an Andrew Mellon Fellow at the National Research Council. At the Harvard Kennedy School he led faculty and student-based consulting projects with governmental organisations, and at Oxford, he has advised major corporations (Note: Diageo Corporation, Pepsi Co., and BP along with financial companies such as Ballie Gifford and Generation Investment Management, and Australian, New Zealand, Dutch, Swedish, Canadian, US, and UK pension funds and the UK government’s Pension Protection Fund.) on their global environmental performance.

In 2020, IP Group appointed Clark as the Chair of its Ethics Committee, which was established to oversee the company's Ethical Investment Framework. He is also a member of its ESG Committee.

=== Research and contributions ===
Initially, his research was on regional economics, patterns of employment and unemployment, and the market forces driving geographical and economic differentiation. He is the co-author of Regional Dynamics: Studies in Adjustment Theory (Allen & Unwin, 1986) and the author of Unions and Communities Under Siege (CUP, 1988). He has also published research on political theory as represented by State Apparatus with Michael Dear (Allen & Unwin 1982) and the role of judicial decision making in the development of American cities. He is the author of Judges and the Cities (University of Chicago Press, 1984).

At Oxford, he has promoted research in economic geography and finance and is a co-editor (Note: With Mary-Ann Feldman, Meric Gertler and Dariusz Wójcik) of the leading handbook in the field: The Oxford Handbook of Economic Geography (1st Edn. 2000; 2nd Edn. 2018). He is also the author of many books and papers on savings behaviour and financial institutions including Pension Fund Capitalism (OUP 2000), European Pensions and Global Finance (OUP 2004), and Saving for Retirement (OUP 2012). (Note: With Janelle Knox-Hayes and Kendra Strauss) He is co-editor of the Oxford Handbook of Pensions and Retirement Income (OUP 2014). (Note: With Alicia Munnell and Michael Orszag) In recent years, his research has focused on the geographical structure and performance of financial markets and organisations found in books such as The Geography of Finance (OUP 2007), (Note: With Dariusz Wójcik) Sovereign Wealth Funds (Princeton 2012), (Note: With Adam Dixon and Ashby Monk) and Institutional Investors in Global Markets (OUP 2017).

== Bibliography ==
=== Selected published books ===
- Clark, G. L., & Monk, A. (2017). Institutional Investors in Global Markets. Oxford: Oxford University Press. ISBN ISBN 978-0-69-1142296.
- Clark, G. L., Dixon, A., & Monk, A. (2013). Sovereign Wealth Funds: Legitimacy, Governance and Global Power. Princeton: Princeton University Press. ISBN ISBN 978-0-69-1142296.
- Clark, G. L., Strauss, K., & Knox-Hayes, J. (2012). Saving for Retirement: Intention, Context, and Behaviour. Oxford: Oxford University Press. ISBN ISBN 978-0-19-960085-4.
- Clark, G. L., & Wójcik, D. (2007). The Geography of Finance: Corporate Governance in the Global Marketplace. Oxford: Oxford University Press. ISBN ISBN 978-0-19-921336-8.
- Clark, G. L., & Tracey, P. (2004). Global Competitiveness and Innovation. Basingstoke and New York: Palgrave Macmillan. ISBN ISBN 1-4039-1889-9, ISBN ISBN 1-4039-3263-8.
- Clark, G. L. (2003). European Pensions & Global Finance. Oxford: Oxford University Press. ISBN ISBN 0-19-925363-3, ISBN ISBN 0-19-925364-1.
- Clark, G. L. (2000). Pension Fund Capitalism. Oxford: Oxford University Press. ISBN ISBN 0-19-924047-7, ISBN ISBN 0-19-924048-5. Chinese translation: Beijing: China Financial Publishing House, 2008. ISBN ISBN 978-7-5049-4639-3.

=== Selected edited books ===
- Clark, G. L., Feldman, M., Gertler, M. S., & Wójcik, D. (2018). The New Oxford Handbook of Economic Geography. Oxford: Oxford University Press.
- Clark, G. L., Dixon, A., & Monk, A. (2009). Managing Financial Risk: From the Global to the Local. Oxford: Oxford University Press. ISBN ISBN 978-0-19-955743-1.
- Clark, G. L., Munnell, A., & Orszag, M. (2006). The Oxford Handbook of Pensions and Retirement Income. Oxford: Oxford University Press. ISBN ISBN 0-19-927246-8.
- Clark, G. L., & Whiteside, N. (2003). Pension Security in the 21st Century. Oxford: Oxford University Press. ISBN ISBN 0-19-926176-8, ISBN ISBN 0-19-928557-8.
- Clark, G. L., Gertler, M. S., & Feldman, M. (2000). The Oxford Handbook of Economic Geography. Oxford: Oxford University Press. ISBN ISBN 0-19-823410-4. Chinese translation: Beijing: Commercial Press, 2005.

=== Selected recent published papers ===
- Clark, G. L., & O’Neill, P. (2024). An economic and financial geography of the Australian superannuation industry. Geographical Research, 61(4), 443-457.
- Clark, G. L., Innocenti, S., & McGill, S. (2024). Experience of financial challenges, retirement concerns, and planning: evidence from representative samples of workers in 16 countries. Journal of Pension Economics and Finance, 61(4), 443-457.
- Clark, G. L. (2024). Tacit knowledge, hoarding, and rent-seeking behaviour in the global asset management industry. Finance & Space, 1(1), 58-75.
- Clark, G. L., & Dixon, A. (2023). Legitimacy of global finance and the extraordinary growth in ESG measures and metrics. Environment and Planning A: Economy and Space, 56(2), 645-61.
- Clark, G. L. (2022). Agency, technological change, and concern about future employment prospects. ZFW—Advances in Economic Geography, 66(1), 3-17.
- Clark, G. L. (2022). The problematic nature of UK pension fund regulation: performing governance at the expense of pension adequacy. Competition & Change, 26(1), 125-142.
- Clark, G. L., Cojoianu, T., Ascui, F., Hoepner, A., & Wójcik, D. (2021). Does the fossil fuel divestment movement impact new oil and gas fundraising? Journal of Economic Geography, 21(1), 141-164.
- Clark, G. L. (2021). The significance of financial competence and risk tolerance in home-related expenditure by jurisdiction and regime. Zeitschrift für Wirtschaftsgeographie, 65(1), 12-27.

== Honours ==
In 2005, Clark was elected Fellow of the British Academy (FBA), and in 2014 received an honorary doctorate from the Panteion University of Athens. He also received the Distinguished Alumni Award by McMaster University, and the Chancellor’s Medal of the University of California–Santa Barbara.
