= Cameron Hepburn =

Australian economist

- Born: Australia

Academic background
- Education: University of Melbourne; University of Oxford

Academic work
- Discipline: Environmental Economics
- Institutions: University of Oxford

Cameron Hepburn is the former Director of the Smith School of Enterprise and the Environment, the Battcock Professor of Environmental Economics at the University of Oxford, and formerly a professor at the London School of Economics and Political Science. He is also the Co-Director of the Economics of Sustainability Programme at the Institute for New Economic Thinking at the Oxford Martin School.

== Education ==
Hepburn attended Camberwell Grammar School and received his undergraduate education in law and engineering at the University of Melbourne in Australia and his master's degree and doctorate in economics from the University of Oxford as a Rhodes Scholar.

== Career ==
Hepburn was an advisor to the former UK Secretary of State for Energy and Climate Change. He used to be part of the Academic Panel within the UK Department for Environment, Food and Rural Affairs and the UK Department of Energy and Climate Change. Hepburn advised the UN and the OECD on environmental policy, energy and resources. He has also worked at Shell, Mallesons, and McKinsey & Company.

His business endeavours have included co-founding Climate Bridge, a transnational developer of clean energy projects, as well as Vivid Economics, an environment and energy consultancy firm. In 2013 Hepburn co-founded Aurora Energy Research. His role in co-founding these clean energy companies led in part to receiving the 2015 Advance Global Australian Award in Clean Energy. In 2021, Vivid Economics was acquired by McKinsey & Company. Hepburn was the Director of the Smith School of Enterprise and the Environment, the Director of the Economics of Sustainability Programme at the Institute for New Economic Thinking, and Co-Director of the Net Zero Carbon Investment Initiative.

== Research ==
Hepburn was a Research Fellow at the Grantham Research Institute on Climate Change and the Environment at the London School of Economics and Political Science and his research interests include environmental economics, climate change economics, environmental policy, carbon markets and emissions trading, sustainability, and behavioural economics. He has published in a range of disciplines including economics, public policy, law, engineering, philosophy, and biology. His research has been presented at TEDx in Vienna, and in London.

Hepburn is an expert on economically-informed global environmental policy, especially government responses to climate change. This has included novel ideas to find "sensitive intervention points" in his role chairing the UK Committee on Climate Change Policy Advisory Group, and to reduce emissions influencing consumers away from climate change drivers, such as introducing a meat tax. His work on removing carbon dioxide from the atmosphere has led him to take on positions such as the Principal Investigator of the Greenhouse Gas Removal Hub. The project is funded by the UK government as a part of its mission to reduce the effects of climate change.

== Selected publications ==
- Kruitwagen, L.; Story, K. T.; Friedrich, J.; Byers, L.; Skillman, S.; Hepburn, C. (28 October 2021). "A global inventory of photovoltaic solar energy generating units". Nature. 598 (7882): 604–610. Bibcode:2021Natur.598..604K. doi:10.1038/s41586-021-03957-7. PMID 34707304. S2CID 240071854.
- Hepburn, Cameron; O'Callaghan, Brian; Stern, Nicholas; Stiglitz, Joseph; Zenghelis, Dimitri (28 September 2020). "Will COVID-19 fiscal recovery packages accelerate or retard progress on climate change?". Oxford Review of Economic Policy. 36 (Supplement_1): S359–S381. doi:10.1093/oxrep/graa015. PMC 7239121.
- Hepburn, Cameron; Stern, Nicholas; Stiglitz, Joseph E. (August 2020). "'Carbon pricing' special issue in the European economic review". European Economic Review. 127 103440. doi:10.1016/j.euroecorev.2020.103440. PMC 7180378. PMID 32336763.
- Hepburn, Cameron; Adlen, Ella; Beddington, John; Carter, Emily A.; Fuss, Sabine; Mac Dowell, Niall; Minx, Jan C.; Smith, Pete; Williams, Charlotte K. (7 November 2019). "The technological and economic prospects for CO2 utilization and removal". Nature. 575 (7781): 87–97. Bibcode:2019Natur.575...87H. doi:10.1038/s41586-019-1681-6. hdl:10044/1/75208. PMID 31695213. S2CID 207911705.
- Farmer, J. D.; Hepburn, C.; Ives, M. C.; Hale, T.; Wetzer, T.; Mealy, P.; Rafaty, R.; Srivastav, S.; Way, R. (12 April 2019). "Sensitive intervention points in the post-carbon transition". Science. 364 (6436): 132–134. Bibcode:2019Sci...364..132F. doi:10.1126/science.aaw7287. PMID 30975879. S2CID 109941175.
- Hamilton, Kirk; Hepburn, Cameron, eds. (2017). National Wealth: What is Missing, Why it Matters. doi:10.1093/oso/9780198803720.001.0001. ISBN 978-0-19-880372-0.
- Hepburn, Cameron; Farmer, J. Doyne (2020). "Less precision, more truth: Uncertainty in climate economics and macroprudential policy". Handbook on the Economics of Climate Change. doi:10.4337/9780857939067.00026. ISBN 978-0-85793-906-7. S2CID 225799433.
- Helm, Dieter; Hepburn, Cameron, eds. (2014). Nature in the Balance. doi:10.1093/acprof:oso/9780199676880.001.0001. ISBN 978-0-19-967688-0.
- Hepburn, Cameron J.; Quah, John K.-H.; Ritz, Robert A. (February 2013). "Emissions trading with profit-neutral permit allocations". Journal of Public Economics. 98: 85–99. doi:10.1016/j.jpubeco.2012.10.004.
- Helm, Dieter; Hepburn, Cameron, eds. (2009). The Economics and Politics of Climate Change. doi:10.1093/acprof:osobl/9780199573288.001.0001. ISBN 978-0-19-957328-8.
