= Ecosystem valuation =

Ecosystem valuation is an economic process which assigns a value (either monetary, biophysical, or other) to an ecosystem and/or its ecosystem services. By quantifying, for example, the human welfare benefits of a forest to reduce flooding and erosion while sequestering carbon, providing habitat for endangered species, and absorbing harmful chemicals, such monetization ideally provides a tool for policy-makers and conservationists to evaluate management impacts and compare a cost-benefit analysis of potential policies. However, such valuations are estimates and involve the inherent quantitative uncertainty and philosophical debate of evaluating a range non-market costs and benefits.

== History and cconomic model ==
=== History ===
Cost-benefit analyses and the generation of market value have existed within the economic literature for centuries. However, in 1997, Robert Costanza was the first to estimate the worldwide worth of ecosystem services—bringing new attention to the field of ecosystem valuation. He and his colleagues calculated that such services were worth $33 trillion annually ($44 trillion present dollars).

Despite Costanza's fanfare, the World Bank, three decades later, that "the benefits provided by natural ecosystems are both widely recognized and poorly understood.”

Citing the importance of such knowledge to informed policy-making, in 2007, Environmental Ministers from the G8 + 5 nations agreed to both publicly call for and begin to undertake the calculation of global ecosystem benefits, conservation costs, and the opportunity costs of developing such ecosystems. The resulting watershed initiative and ongoing project is The Economics of Ecosystems and Biodiversity (TEEB).

In the United States, the President's Council on Science and Technology suggested in 2011 that the “U.S. government should institute and fund a Quadrennial Ecosystems Services Trends (QuEST) Assessment” that studying trends in ecosystem performance, quality, and value.

=== Economic models: values, costs, and value methodology ===
Ecosystem valuation attempts to capture the range of benefits and costs contained within a complicated natural web with a range of economic methodologies.

Ecological systems provide four general categories of services: provisioning (e.g. fish to eat, timber to sell), regulatory, supporting, and cultural (e.g. ecosystems supporting indigenous gathering techniques, or supplies for traditional clothing). See Figure 1. for a mangrove-specific example of this complex subject.

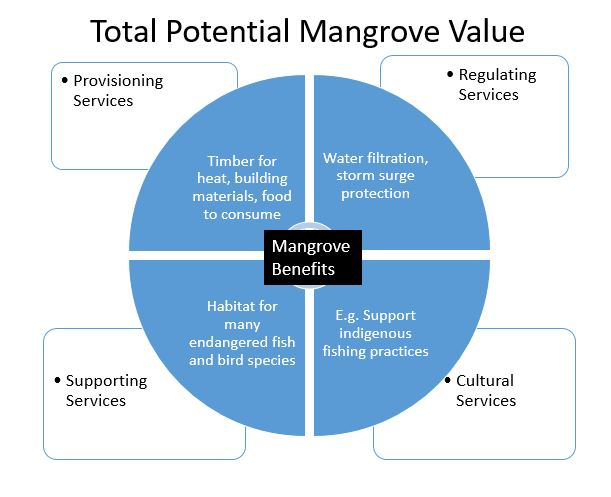
Figure 1. Example of ecosystem services range for mangrove habitat

These four types of services can then provide two basic categories of value: the use and non-use categories. Environmental economists have further separated categorizes for which individuals are willing to pay:

- Direct-use value.
  - The simplest form of ecosystem valuation for orthodox environmental economists, this translates the direct ecological yield as it would be on international trade markets: e.g. the value of water, timber, fish, or other commodities if immediately developed and sold at market price.Thus, an exchange value or 'price' is associated with the objects of value, regarded as natural capital, associated with ecosystems and this may be based on the ability of a system to produce yields each year that are exchangeable in operating markets and have existing exchange prices.
- Indirect use value attributed to indirect utilization of ecosystem services, through the positive externalities that ecosystems provide.
  - The World Bank explains that these values are "derived from ecosystem services that provide benefits outside the ecosystem itself. Examples include natural water filtration which often benefits people far downstream, the storm protection function of mangrove forests which benefits coastal properties and infrastructure, and carbon sequestration which benefits the entire global community by abating climate change."
- Option value attributed to preserving the option to utilize ecosystem services in the future.
- Existence value attributed to the pure existence of an ecosystem.
- Altruistic value based on the welfare the ecosystem may give other people.
- Bequest value based on the welfare the ecosystem may give future generations.

Given these types of potential ecological values, economists utilize a variety of methods to calculate those market values and measure non-market values. Standard environmental economic methods are used to place a monetary value on ecosystem services where there are no market prices. These include "stated preference" methods and "revealed preference" methods. Stated preference methods, such as the contingent valuation method ask people for their willingness to pay for a certain ecosystem (service). Revealed preference methods, such as hedonic pricing and the travel cost method, use a relation with a market good or service to estimate the willingness-to-pay for the service. Applying such preference based approaches has been criticized as a means of deriving the value of ecosystems and biodiversity and for avoiding deliberation, justification and judgment in making choices. The monetary value society attaches to ecosystem services depends on the income distribution. It is argued that ecosystem valuations must steadily increase over time, in line with rising global income as well as increasing scarcity of functioning ecosystems.

== Valuation results ==
While the literature is still emerging, many important studies have resulting in striking valuations.

One academic paper by de Groot et al., which synthesized more than 300 scholarly works collectively evaluating the 10 main biomes, "shows that the total value of ecosystem services is considerable and ranges between 490 int$/year for the total bundle of ecosystem services that can potentially be provided by an ‘average’ hectare of open oceans to almost 350,000 int$/year for the potential services of an ‘average’ hectare of coral reefs." This potential benefit can take many forms depending on the degree of exploitation and such exploitation's sustainability, but can result, for example, in large ecotourist revenues for local communities, protection from storm destruction, or profit for an international lumber company.

Furthermore, de Groot et al. find that most of their paper's calculated value is "outside the market and best considered as non-tradable public benefits. The continued over-exploitation of ecosystems thus comes at the expense of the livelihood of the poor and future generations."

The Economics of Ecosystems and Biodiversity (TEEB), in one of its first large, cumulative reports, also found that ecosystem services start at roughly $100/hectare/year for open ocean, and top off to more than $1,000,000/hectare/year for the most lucrative coral reefs.

Beyond biome "price tags," these environmental valuations can explore quite complex policy questions. For example, the Copenhagen Consensus think tank calculated that stemming the loss of coral reefs by 50 percent by 2030 would return more than $24 for every dollar spent. The Consensus' founder, Bjorn Lomborg, explains that "coral reefs, which both act as fishery hatcheries and fishing resources while storing abundant numbers of species. At the same time, coral reefs possess an amazing beauty, which both shows up in large tourism revenues but also in most individuals saying they are willing to pay a certain amount to make sure they continue to exist for our grand children. … [Programs to preserve 50% more coral reef by 2030] cost about $3 billion per year but the total benefits likely run to at least $72, or about $24 dollars back for every dollar invested."

The National Oceanic and Atmospheric Administration (NOAA) manages the Integrated Valuation Environmental Services and Tradeoffs (InVEST) Natural Capital Project. This open-source tool—although geared towards policy-makers, advocates, and scientists—allows anyone to interact with a map quantifying "trade-offs between alternative management choices" and identifying "areas where investment in natural capital can enhance human development and conservation.”

As another example, the Basque Centre for Climate Change (BC3) hosts the Artificial Intelligence for Environment & Sustainability (ARIES) Project. This open-source software was designed to integrate scientific models for environmental sustainability assessment and policy-making, with an initial focus on ecosystem services

=== Payment for environmental services (PES) ===
After (and, sometimes, before) evaluating the ecosystem costs and benefits, some programs have attempted to internalize those values with specific programs providing payments for environmental services. Costa Rica paid about $42/hectare for landowners to preserve forests; in 2010 Norway began paying Indonesia a total of $1 billion to mitigate deforestation; China responded to 1998 floods with payments targeting deforestation and soil erosion; and many other programs large and small.

== Controversies with and limits to ecosystem valuations ==
From an academic perspective, although scholarly research is quite rapidly adding to this field of understanding, many knowledge gaps still remain. For example, there is an inherent uncertainty in attempting to quantify non-market goods. As pointed to by de Groot et al., many environmental goods (such as clean air and biodiversity) are simply not traded in established markets. In addition, many environmental goods may be non-rival, non-excludable, and even inseparable goods with multiple value options further complicating any valuation.

From an ethical and philosophical perspective, too, ecosystem valuation is far from uncontroversial. Arguments about the non-market valuation of ecosystem can be found by referring to environmental ethics and deep ecology.

Since animals do not put explicit prices on ecosystems they use, but do behave as if they are valuable, e.g. by selecting one territory vs. another, defending their territories, etc., it is mostly a matter of definition whether ecology should include valuation as an issue. It may be anthropocentric to do so, since "valuation" more clearly refers to a human perception rather than being an "objective" attribute of the system perceived. Ecology itself is also human perception, and such related concepts as a food chain are constructed by humans to help them understand ecosystems. In many cases by those who hold that markets and pricing exist independently of any individual human observers and "users", and especially those who deem markets to be "out of control", ecosystem valuation is considered a (marginal, ignored) part of economics. Others argue that natural capital is an economic concept that is at least as viable as financial capital, which itself is determined on subjective valuation. Some even suggest that valuation of ecosystem services is more cogent than financial valuation, as the ecosystem would continue after the collapse of the economy, while the inverse is not valid.

In addition, many questions about where ecosystem benefits go, and who should pay for those benefits, is an ongoing political debate. In one Washington city, residents now pay a water bill in order for the town to buy and restore land adjacent to the municipal water source; and international examples of evaluating and paying for services is no less a field of ongoing development.

== See also ==
- Payment for Ecosystem Services
- Ecological economics
- Ecological goods and services
- Environmental Ethics
- Deep Ecology
- Earth Economics
