= Value of Earth =

Economical estimate of the net worth of the planet

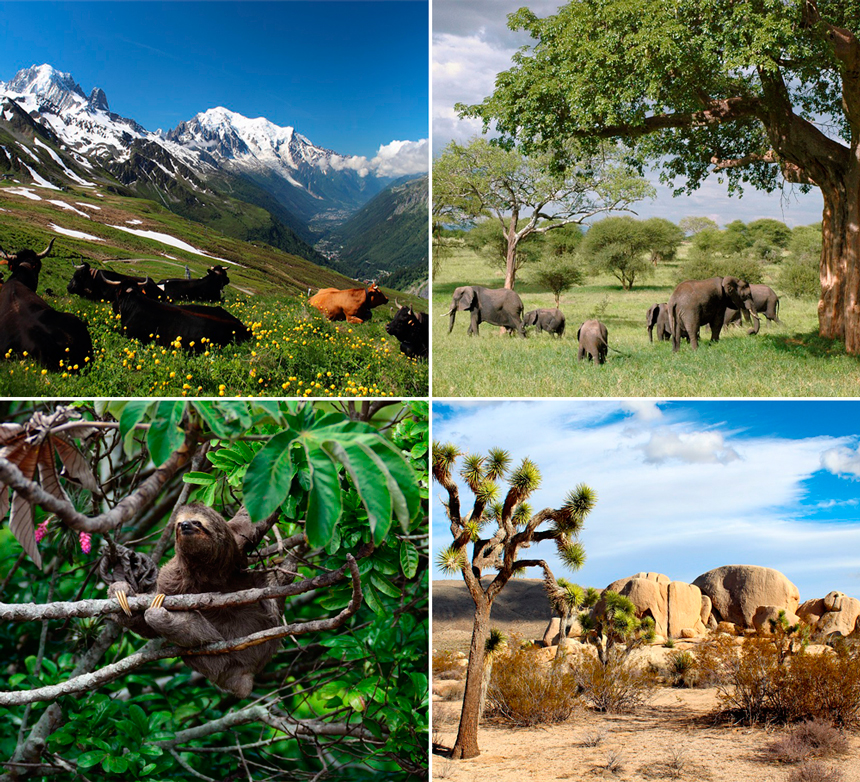

The value of Earth, i.e. the net worth of our planet, is a debated concept both in terms of the definition of value, as well as the scope of "Earth". Since most of the planet's substance is not available as a resource, "earth" has been equated with the sum of all ecosystem services as evaluated in ecosystem valuation or full-cost accounting.

The price on the services that the world's ecosystems provide to humans has been estimated in 1997 to be $33 trillion per annum, with a confidence interval of from $16 trillion to $54 trillion. Compared with the combined gross national product (GNP) of all the countries at about the same time ($18 trillion), ecosystems would appear to be providing 1.8 times as much economic value as people are creating. The result details have been questioned, in particular the GNP, which is believed to be closer to $28 trillion (which makes ecosystem services only 1.2 times as precious), while the basic approach was readily acknowledged. The World Bank gives the total gross domestic product (GDP) in 1997 as $31 trillion, which would about equal the biosystem value. Criticisms were addressed in a later publication, which gave an estimate of $125 trillion/yr for ecosystem services in 2011, which would make them twice as valuable as the GDP, with a yearly loss of 4.3–20.2 trillion/yr.

The BBC has published a website that lists various types of resources on various scales together with their current estimated values from different sources, among them BBC Earth, and Tony Juniper in collaboration with The United Nations Environment Programme World Conservation Monitoring Centre (UNEP-WCMC).

== See also ==
- Gross world product
- Willingness to pay
- Earth Economics
- Ecological values of mangroves
- Natural capital
- Total economic value
