= Total economic value =

Concept in cost-benefit analysis

Total economic value (TEV) is a concept in cost–benefit analysis that refers to the value derived by people from a natural resource, a man-made heritage resource or an infrastructure system, compared to not having it. It appears in environmental economics as an aggregation of the (main function based) values provided by a given ecosystem.

== Value classification ==
The value of an ecosystem can be distinguished as:

1. Use value — Can be split into Direct and Indirect use values:
  - Direct use value: Obtained through a removable product in nature (i.e., timber, fish, water).
  - Indirect use value: Obtained through a non-removable product in nature (i.e., sunset, waterfall).
2. Non-use value — Values for existence of the natural resource. For example, knowing that tigers are in the wild, even though you may never see them.
3. Option value: Placed on the potential future ability to use a resource even though it is not currently used and the likelihood of future use is very low. This reflects the willingness to preserve an option for potential future use.
4. Bequest value or existence value: Placed on a resource that will never be used by current individuals, derived from the value of satisfaction from preserving a natural environment or a historic environment (i.e., natural heritage or cultural heritage) for future generations.

Total economic value is the price of the customer's best alternative (the reference value) plus the economic value of whatever differentiates the offering from the alternative (the differentiation value).

== See also ==
- Green accounting
