= George Lof =

American engineer and inventor

George Oscar Löf (13 December 1913 – 12 October 2009) was an American engineer and inventor who was best known for his contributions to solar energy research. "Nobody played a more enduring role in the 20th century solar house movement than George Löf."

== Early life ==
Löf was born in Aspen, Colorado, on 13 December 1913. His family later moved to Denver, where he graduated from East High School. He earned an undergraduate degree from the University of Denver in 1935, and a PhD in chemical engineering from Massachusetts Institute of Technology in 1940. He married Laura Davadell Scobey in 1940.

== Career ==
Löf became interested in solar energy at MIT, where he worked under Hoyt C. Hottel and analyzed data from MIT Solar House I.

In 1943, Löf designed an early flat-plate solar heating unit and installed it on the roof of his house in Boulder, Colorado. It was called the "first solar-heated home" in the United States.

In 1957, he built a house in the Cherry Hills neighborhood of Denver which used a novel method to collect and store solar heat. It was designed by architect James M. Hunter, and Löf designed a flat-plate collection system which heated air and circulated the heat to be stored in rock beds in large cardboard tubes inside the house. Löf published several technical papers describing the house and its performance. It cost $40,000 excluding the cost of the heating equipment, which was financed by the American Window Glass Company. Löf lived in the house for more than 50 years until his death.

In 1974, he oversaw the construction of a research home that was the world's first to also be cooled by solar energy.

Löf taught chemical engineering at the University of Colorado and the University of Denver before serving on the faculty of Colorado State University in the civil engineering department from 1967 - 1987. He founded the university's Solar Energy Applications Laboratory in 1972. From 1973 - 1975, he was the president of the International Solar Energy Society.

Löf invented a solar cooker, marketed as the Umbroiler, but it was not a commercial success.

== Awards and honors ==
Löf was the first Colorado State University recipient of the Charles Greeley Abbot Award, in 1980. The award is given by the American Solar Energy Society in recognition of contributions in the solar energy field.

== Published works ==
- Löf, George (1993). Active Solar Systems (Solar Heat Technologies). MIT Press. ISBN 0-262-12167-0.
- Löf, George; Kneese, Allen V. (1993). Economics of Water Utilization. RFF Press.

== Patents ==
- Solar Heating Apparatus and Method (US Patent 2680565, filed 1945, granted 1954)
- Solar heating system and operation thereof (US Patent 4061267, granted 1977)
- Heat absorber for solar energy (US Patent 4072142, granted 1978)
- Modular construction for solar heat collector (US Patent 4073283, granted 1978)
- Solar heat absorber (US Patent 4141338, granted 1979)
- Modular construction for solar heat collector (US Patent 4154223, granted 1979)
- System for automatically covering swimming pools and method therefor (US Patent 5184356, granted 1993)
