= Option value (cost–benefit analysis) =

In cost–benefit analysis and social welfare economics, the term option value refers to the value that is placed on private willingness to pay for maintaining or preserving a public asset or service even if there is little or no likelihood of the individual actually ever using it. The concept is most commonly used in public policy assessment to justify continuing investment in parks, wildlife refuges and land conservation, as well as rail transportation facilities and services. It is also recognized as an element of the total economic value of environmental resources.

This concept of "option value" in cost–benefit analysis is different from the concept used in finance, where the term refers to the valuation of a financial instrument that provides for a future purchase of an asset. (See Option time value.) However, the two can be related insofar as both can be interpreted as a valuation of risk factors.

== Application ==
In the environmental research literature, option value is commonly interpreted as the value of preserving threatened natural resources so that they might be available for use in the future. It has been applied for establishing the value of preserving wildlife habitats, wilderness areas, and water recreation resources. In the transportation research literature, option value is most commonly interpreted as estimated the value that non-users are willing to pay to ensure continued availability of a rail transport facility and its service (as an option that will be available in the future). It is recognized as a type of benefit to be considered in cost benefit evaluation of transportation investment alternatives by the UK Department for Transport and the Scottish Government, and has also been used for assessment of regional rail projects in the Netherlands. In the US, option value is recognized in several transportation benefit-cost analysis guides, including those of the Transportation Research Board's Committee on Transportation Economics, the Transit Cooperative Research Program, and the Victoria Transport Policy Institute.

== Evolution ==
The term "option value" and its theoretical underpinnings as a non-user benefit were initially developed in 1964 by Burton Weisbrod. It was posited as an element of benefit distinct from the traditional concept of consumer surplus, and it depended on three factors: (1) uncertainty about future need for the asset, (2) irreversibility or high cost of replacement if the asset is lost, and (3) non-storability of the asset. That was followed by an active academic debate about the concept, and refinement of its measurement. Some economists further developed its distinction from consumer surplus and role as an uncertainty risk aversion premium, leading to the suggestion that a concept of "option price" may be more appropriate. Others stressed the irreversibility aspect of the resource and further specified the framework for valuing avoidance of that risk, with suggestions to adopt a concept of "quasi option value" or "irreversibility effect." All of these terms and concepts appear in academic literature. However, the original term "option value" is still commonly used in applied studies (as apparent in works cited in the preceding application section; see also).

== See also ==
- Cost–benefit analysis
- Non-use value
- Total economic value
