= Eco-restructuring =

Eco-restructuring is the implication for an ecologically sustainable economy. The principle of ecological modernization establishes the core literature of the functions that eco-restructuring has within a global regime. Eco-restructuring has an emphasis on the technological progressions within an ecological system. Government officials implement environmental policies to establish the industrial- ecological progressions that enable the motion of economic modernization. When establishing economic growth, policy makers focus on the progression towards a sustainable environment by establishing a framework of ecological engineering. Government funding is necessary when investing in efficient technologies to stimulate technological development.

Environmental dimensions such as the preservation of landscape is achieved through sustainability. When analyzing the issues of sustainability, the importance of socio-technical transitions is highlighted to meet the needs of ecological policies. When an organization of resources is sustainable, it means that it will remain at a certain level of progress due to self-preservation without affecting the fundamental purpose of its existence. Changes in the industrial sector allows for sustainability to progress in an effective manner. When eco-restructuring is applied to the concept of sustainability, environmentally friendly technologies are essentially the main framework for clean and efficient productions.

Social support and acknowledgement must be present when highlighting the functions of modernizing the ecological structures. To have a smooth transition between socio-technical categories, social agreement is important when introducing eco-restructuring methods. When forming new ecological policies, policy makers focus on the movement that sustainable environments have in regards to the social expectations.

Economic production is an example of the existing relationship between eco-restructuring and sustainability. Cleaner production with minimal impact on the environment is the main idea behind the correlation of the two subjects. Since industrial ecology contributes to the direction of sustainability, eco-restructuring is perceived as a benefit for the environment and natural adaptation. Critics of the eco-restructuring and sustainability policies argue that a clear balance between a self-preserving ecological system and mass production is difficult to maintain. However, ecological engineering has been a major component used when applying eco-restructuring methods in the production of resources.

== Origins ==
In 1998, the book Eco-restructuring: Implications for Sustainable Development was published by Robert Ayres. The book provided a significant contribution to the research of industrial- ecological progressions. Robert Ayres introduced a new prototype of eco-restructuring for sustainable development of technologies, economic movement and social lifestyles. The implication for cleaner and more efficient technologies contributes to the research of ecological construction.

=== Technologies ===
Efficient technologies are defined as services that reduce the non-renewable resources produced and increase the production rate. Renewable energy is a form of energy obtained from clean and natural resources. Solar and wind power technologies are examples of clean energy forms that would eliminate pollution produced from the coal and diesel energy sectors.

=== Economic movement ===
The economic movement outlined by Robert Ayers refers to the use of green economies. This type of economy structure looks at ways to reduce the environmental impacts. Nations focus on steering their policy agenda to allow the implementation of ecological strategies. This will accelerate the transformation of the economy sectors towards a clean and effective ecological state.

=== Social lifestyles ===
Human economic activities can influence the type of issues that ecological systems face. These social lifestyles are subject to the changes in the production of goods and services. An example of this idea would be the collection of raw materials and disposing them in a proper efficient manner that will have little impact on the environment. If the whole cycle is restructured to meet the principles of ecological regulation, then experts would have to analyze the effects of human activities and determine a possible alternative to the removal of biomedical waste and other raw materials.

Many of the eco-restructuring principles were outlined in the Eco-restructuring: Implications for Sustainable Development book. However, policy makers can also have an opinion on the ideas and promises that this method of sustainability offers. Certain factors can influence the regulations that the policies cover such as the need for sustainable development. Legislative measures are also developed based on the propositions of ecological and economical advantages. The principle of sustainable development applies to the restructuring of technologies, economic movement and social lifestyles. These principles have helped to determine an evolution of the ecological system.

== Environmental factors ==
When an ecological system is altered, environmental standards must be put in place to preserve the stability of the environment. The application of eco-restructuring seeks to improve the environmental stability in relation to manufacturing and waste management. However, ecological effects can occur by following improper procedures. Despite the precautions that must be considered, there are environmental benefits of ecological modernization such as renewable energy. The use of renewable energy would eliminate the threat of ecological dangers such as pollution. Modern technologies also have a role in the impact of the environment. When new technologies are developed, sustainability is achieved through improving the environmental dimensions .

== Eco-restructuring and sustainability ==
Socio-technical transitions correlate to the need for social change in the study of sustainable resources. Sustainability has a significant role in the fields of management such as education, health care, economics, ecology and technology. The main framework for clean and efficient productions is supported by the idea of a self-preserving system. Despite the research supporting the reformation of the ecological system, natural resources can suffer a depletion and will need the support of sustainability to preserve its existence. New policies are required to move towards equality and sustainability since the social expectations reflect the relationship between the two concepts. The public perception for an alternative solution to sustainable development is reflected through the ecological policies enacted by government officials. Eco-restructuring offers a positive aspect to the principles of ecological modernization. It is an alternative to the motion of technological progressions within the global economic regime.

== See also ==
- Ecological modernization
