= Natural Capital Committee =

UK government committee (2012–2020) advising on natural capital

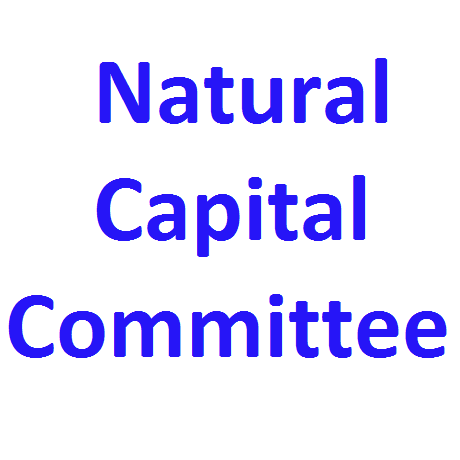

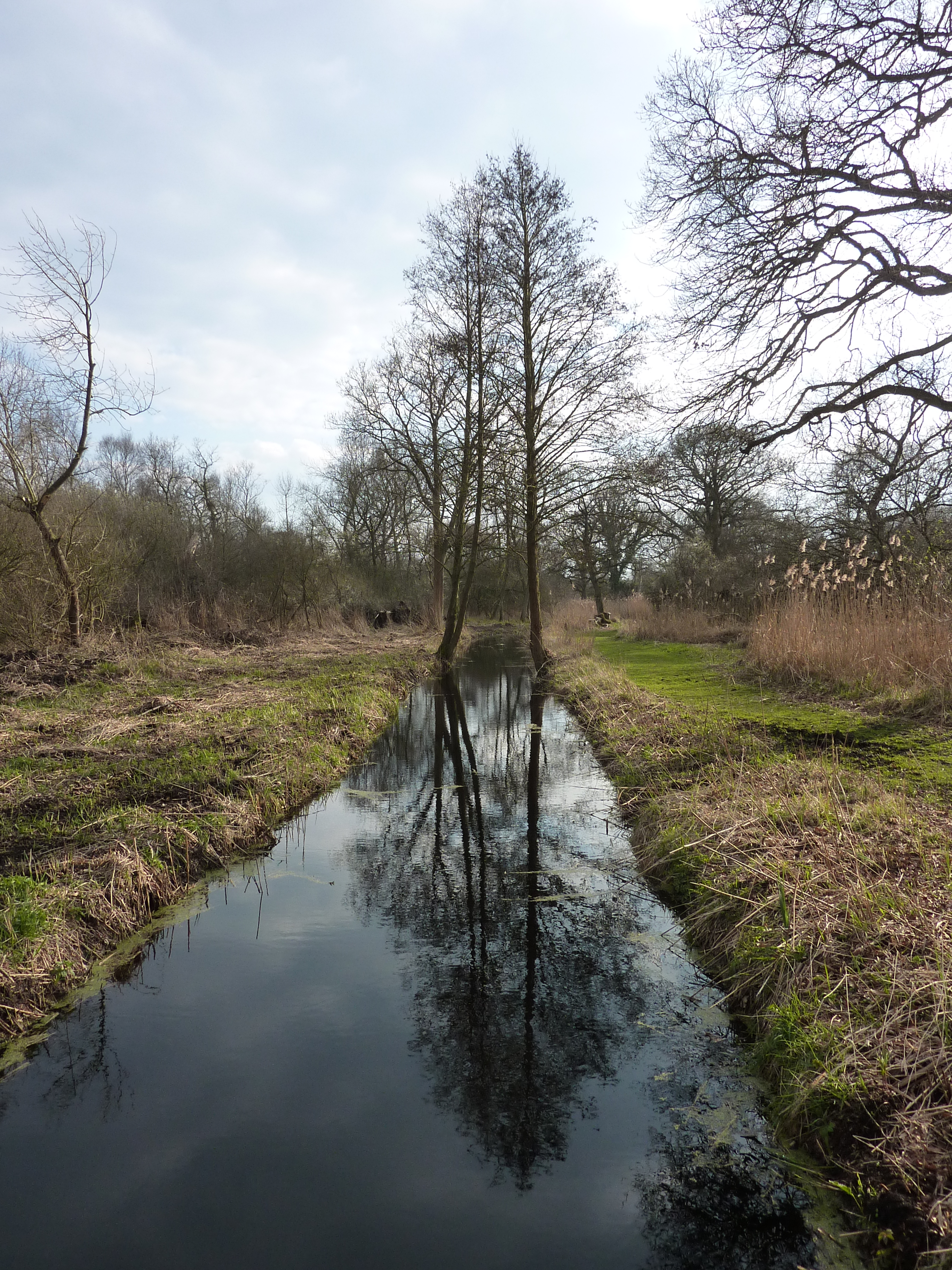
Natural Capital - The Great Fen Project

The Natural Capital Committee (NCC) was an independent body set up in 2012, initially for a three-year period, to report to the UK Government and advise on how to value nature and to ensure England's 'natural wealth' is managed efficiently and sustainably. During its first term it produced three reports to government on the 'State of Natural Capital'. It has called on the Office for National Statistics to integrate the state of the country's natural assets (also known as natural capital) into mainstream national accounting.

Having fulfilled its initial remit, the UK NCC ceased activity in March 2015, but was reformed by the new 2015 conservative government with modified Terms of Reference and a brief to continue for the life of that current parliament (i.e. up to 2020). It finally ceased to exist in December 2020.

== History ==
The NCC was set up as an independent advisory Committee following a key UK Government Natural Environment White Paper commitment in 2011. It initially had a three-year term and formally reported to the Economic Affairs Committee, which is chaired by the Chancellor of the Exchequer.

In November 2012, the Secretary of State for the Department for Environment, Food and Rural Affairs, Owen Paterson, described his ambition for the natural environment and how the work of the Committee fits into this. In a speech to the Royal Society he said: "I do not, however, just want to maintain our natural assets; I want to improve them. I want us to derive the greatest possible benefit from them, while ensuring that they are available for generations to come. This is what the NCC's innovative work is geared towards".

In 2015 the new UK Government announced that the Natural Capital Committee would be continued at least until the end of the current parliament and that its terms of reference would be reviewed. In December 2015 it reappointed Professor Dieter Helm as its chair, with new members to be appointed early in 2016.

== Role and purpose ==
Between 2012 and 2015 the NCC's role was broadly to advise the UK Government on how to ensure England's 'natural wealth' is managed efficiently and sustainably, thereby unlocking opportunities for sustained prosperity and well-being.

The Committee had three Terms of Reference:

1. to provide advice on when, where and how natural assets are being used unsustainably;
2. to advise Government on how it should prioritise action to protect and improve natural capital, so that public and private activity is focused where it will have greatest impact on improving well-being in our society; and,
3. to advise the Government on research priorities to improve future advice and decisions on protecting and enhancing natural capital.

The NCC's main form of advice to Government was in the form of annual reports to Government, containing a series of recommendations on what needs to be done to put the economy on a sustainable footing (as far as the environment is concerned).

In addition, the Committee was also involved in developing natural capital accounting, both at the national and corporate levels. It worked with the UK's Office for National Statistics and the Department for Environment, Food and Rural Affairs to help incorporate natural capital into the national accounts. At a corporate level, the Committee developed and tested a new framework for corporate natural capital accounting to go alongside traditional financial accounts. The aim of this project was to work with a small group of organisations to pilot corporate natural capital accounts, then use the lessons learned to produce high level guidance and a template account for other organisations to follow and implement. It would also use the lessons from this work to inform its own advice to Government.

The Committee also provided ad hoc advice to Government when requested. As of April 2014, it had given advice on forestry, reform of the Common Agricultural Policy and biodiversity offsetting.

In line with its third Term of Reference, the UK NCC produced an advice paper to Government on research priorities. This identified what needs to be done in order to fill the gaps in our knowledge and understanding of natural capital.

== State of Natural Capital reports ==
Between 2012 and 2015 the NCC's advice mainly took the form of annual reports to Government. It produced its first report in spring 2013 and its second in March 2014. The third State of Natural Capital report was published in January 2015.

The first State of Natural Capital report set out a framework for what the NCC thought was needed. This was: to measure and value natural capital in order to better manage it. It highlighted that better management of natural capital can produce economic and wellbeing benefits.

The second State of Natural Capital report contained three key messages:

1. Some assets are currently not being used sustainably. The benefits we derive from them are at risk, and this has significant economic implications;
2. There are substantial economic benefits to be gained from maintaining and improving natural assets. The benefits will be maximised if their full value is incorporated into all decision-making; and,
3. A long-term plan is necessary to maintain and improve natural capital, thereby delivering well-being and economic growth.

To arrive at the first key message, the Committee began identifying those assets that are at risk and record them in a risk register. Perhaps the main message of its second report was the recommendation to establish a 25-year plan for restoring the country's key natural assets.

Government responded to the recommendations of the second report in October 2014.

The third State of Natural Capital report was published by the NCC in January 2015. It recommended that Government should develop a strategy, action plan and investment programme to protect and improve natural capital within a generation. Government gave its response to the third NCC report in September 2015 and later that month the NCC responded with its final advice to government of its initial three-year term.

== Second term reports to government ==
The fourth report on the state of natural capital to the Economic Affairs Committee was published in January 2017. It recognised that, despite the UK Government's pledge to be "the first generation to leave the natural environment of England in a better state than that in which it was found", many elements of the environment were still in decline.

Key recommendations:

- The government's 25 Year Environment Plan should be speedily progressed and put on a statutory footing.
- Accountability for and governance of the 25 Year Environment Plan should be assigned to a specific lead organisation, and should contain ambitious, long-term, measurable targets.
- Government 'Pioneer' projects are key to the Environment Plan's success.
- An investment programme in natural capital is necessary if the 25 Year Environment Plan is to deliver, and levels of investment should be linked to the net benefits they deliver.
- The government should promote natural capital valuation and accounting in both the private sector and public sector.
- The 25 Year Environment Plan should be a key element of development of British agricultural policy, post Brexit and be consistent with the needs of preserving and enhancing natural capital.
- The Environment Plan should create and enhance new wildlife areas and corridors in collaboration with a wide range of landholders.
- The National Infrastructure Commission should include maintenance and recovery of natural capital in its own long-term plans.
- Local authorities and major infrastructure providers should ensure natural capital is protected and enhanced (a reinforcement of Section 40 of the Natural Environment and Rural Communities Act 2006).
- Consideration should be given to establishing new National Parks in England; they should have extended powers to measure and value the key natural capital assets in their area.
- Natural capital approaches to managing biodiversity within river catchments should be encouraged by OFWAT.
- The Office for National Statistics (ONS) should further develop national natural capital accounting procedures, and include renewable assets and maintenance costs in its figures.
- There must be consistency between the government's Climate Change Committee recommendations and the 25 Year Environment Plan.

The 4th report identified its own work priorities for 2017 as:

- Production of a 'How To Do It' guide, based on best practice;
- Production of advice on natural capital valuation under various conditions;
- Publish advice on determining targets and outcomes for the 25 Year Environment Plan;
- Carry on working with ONS and Defra to develop national natural capital accounting methods for land managers.

The committee's final 'end of term' report was published in November 2020.

== Members ==
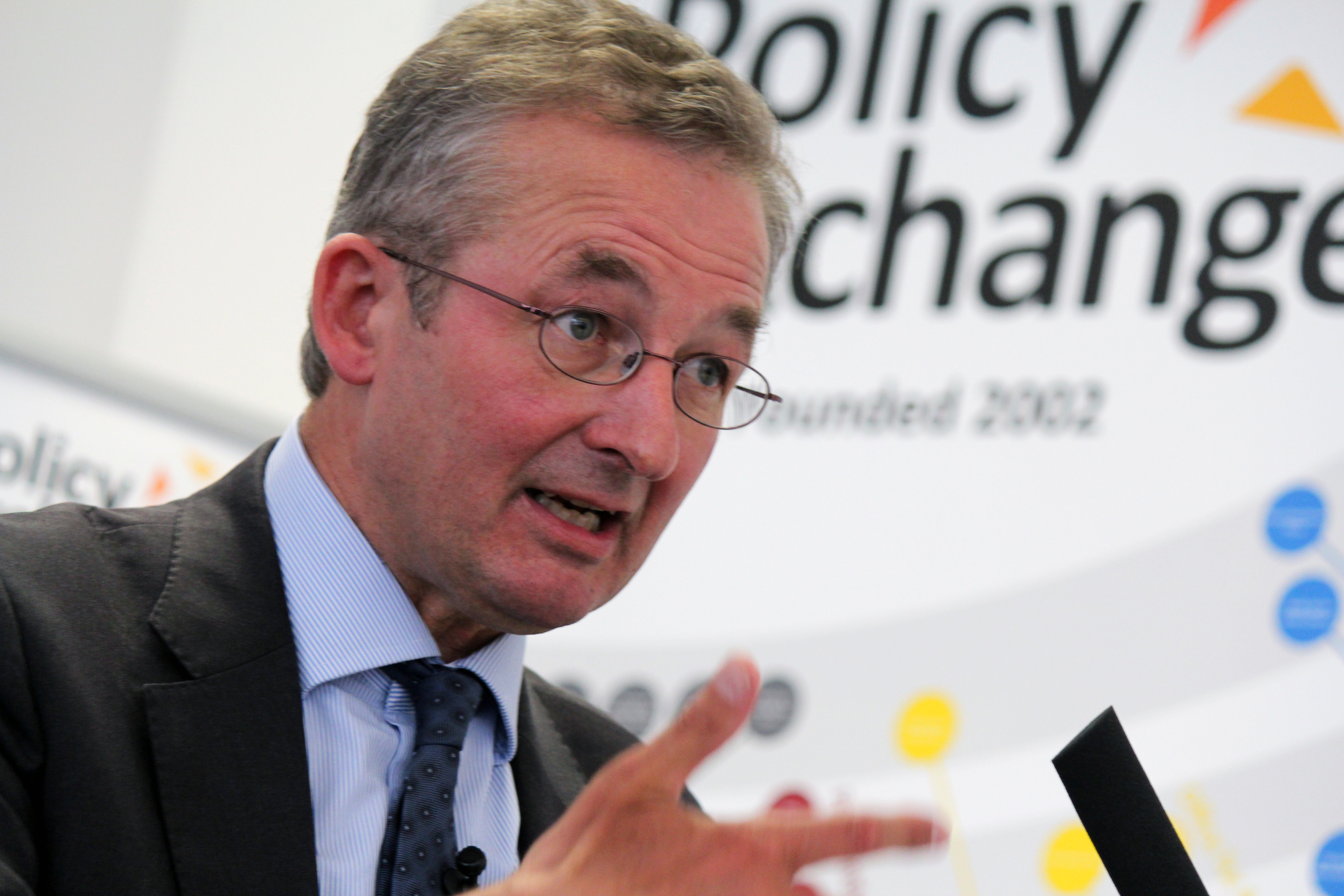
Dieter Helm, chair of the UK Natural Capital Committee

The Committee was chaired by Professor Dieter Helm and supported by a small, full-time secretariat. Between 2012-2015 the Committee members were all from academia and business with expertise and experience in ecology and environmental science, economics and business. These were: Giles Atkinson, Ian Bateman, Rosie Hails, Kerry ten Kate, Georgina Mace, Colin Mayer, Robin Smale.

In February 2016 the UK Government appointed new members of the NCC. The members now were:

- Ian Bateman, Professor of Environmental Economics, University of Exeter; Director of the Land, Environment, Economics and Policy (LEEP) Institute.
- Diane Coyle, Professor of Economics, University of Manchester.
- Paul Leinster, Professor of Environmental Assessment, Cranfield University; formerly Chief Executive of the Environment Agency.
- Georgina Mace, Professor of Biodiversity and Ecosystems at UCL; Director of the Centre for Biodiversity and Environment Research (CBER).
- Colin Mayer, Professor of Management Studies at Saïd Business School, University of Oxford.
- Kathy Willis, Professor of Biodiversity, University of Oxford; Director of Science at the Royal Botanic Gardens, Kew.

== Criticism ==
Guardian columnist George Monbiot has been an outspoken critic of the work of the Natural Capital Committee and of other similar attempts to put a monetary value on natural capital assets and the free ecosystem services they provide. In a speech referring to a recent NCC report which suggested that better protection of the UK's freshwater ecosystems would yield an enhancement in aesthetic value of £700m, he accused the NCC of "trying to compare things which cannot be directly compared". He went on to say:

These figures, ladies and gentlemen, are marmalade. They are finely shredded, boiled to a pulp, heavily sweetened ... and still indigestible. In other words they are total gibberish.

— G. Monbiot

Others have defended the efforts of the Natural Capital Committee to integrate the valuation of natural capital into national and local economic decision-making, arguing that it puts the environment on a more equal footing when weighed against other commercial pressures, and that valuation is not the same as monetisation.

== Publications ==
- First State of Natural Capital Report - April 2013
- Unnatural Corporate Accounting - December 2013
- Second State of Natural Capital Report - March 2014
- Third State of Natural Capital Report - January 2015
- Towards a Framework for Measuring and Defining Changes in Natural Capital - March 2014
