= Larry (cartoonist) =

20th century British cartoonist

Terence Parkes (19 November 1927 – 25 June 2003), known professionally as Larry, was an English cartoonist. His work, consisting largely of single drawings featuring an absurdist view of normal life, was published in many magazines and newspapers, particularly Punch and Private Eye. The pen name under which he worked was inspired by actor Larry Parks. Parkes was born in Birmingham, the son of a welding foreman in a car factory. He was a pupil at Handsworth Grammar School, and he was accepted as a student at Birmingham School of Art aged 15.

Parkes's cartooning style was extremely minimalist. No speech bubbles or captions were used, and he often used a few lines to suggest the outline of some feature, such as an arm or a leg, preferring to concentrate on the main idea of the drawing. Especially in the early part of his career, when cartoonists were expected to produce polished work, he was frequently admonished by his editors to "fill in" his drawings before they would be published. As styles changed in the 1960s and 1970s, his more fluid, off-the-cuff style became his trademark. He was compared to Bill Tidy, both for his particular way of drawing people, and for the speed at which he could work.

In later life, he drew a series of cartoons depicting his usual subjects as if they were sculptures by Rodin on display in a gallery. Instead of "Rodin's Thinker" or "Rodin's Kiss" his art-lovers saw sculptures such as "Rodin's Babysitter" and "Rodin's Cleaning Lady". He extended this into parodies of other works of art, such as the Supper at Emmaus, his version being "the presentation of the bill".

He also did the cartoon sketches that were used on Carry On film titles, Carry On Doctor, Carry On Up the Khyber, Carry On Camping, Carry On Girls and in the late 1980s provided illustrations for W H Smith's own-label stationery packaging.

== Publications ==
Man In Apron (1959) More Man in Apron (1960) Man in Office (1961) Man at Work (1962) Man at Large (1964) Man and Wife (1965) Man in Garden (1966) More Man in Garden (1967) The Larry Omnibus (1967) Man in Motor Car (1968) Man in School (1972) Man on Holiday (1973)

- Larry's Art Collection (1977)
- Larry On Art (1978)

Larry's D.I.Y. Man (1989) Larry on Larry (1994)
