= King Edward VI Handsworth Grammar School for Boys =

King Edward VI Handsworth Grammar School For Boys

Location
- Grove Lane; Handsworth; Birmingham, West Midlands, B21 9ET; England; 52.5046°N 1.9334°W

Information
- Type: Grammar school; Academy
- Motto: 'Haec olim meminisse luvabit - Perhaps someday it will be a delight to remember even these things'
- Established: 1862
- Founder: James Merrick Guest
- Local authority: Birmingham City Council
- Trust: King Edward VI Academy Trust
- Department for Education URN: 143562 Tables
- Ofsted: Reports
- Head teacher: Tim Johnson
- Gender: Boys (and girls in sixth form)
- Age: 11 to 18
- Enrolment: 1000
- Website: www.handsworth.bham.sch.uk

King Edward VI Handsworth Grammar School for Boys, also known as Handsworth Grammar School, is a grammar school that admits boys from the age of eleven (as well as girls in the sixth form, since September 1997). The Bridge Trust school was founded in 1862 and is located in Handsworth, Birmingham, England. it is situated just off the A41, near the junction with the A4040. King Edward Handsworth Grammar School is sometimes abbreviated as HGS. The headmaster is Mr T Johnson.

In September 2017, the school was admitted into the Foundation of the Schools of King Edward VI, where it was renamed King Edward VI Handsworth Grammar School for Boys.

The school has five houses: Henry, William, Nelson, Galahad and Alfred

The school badge depicts the Staffordshire knot over the Zig Zag Perry Bridge.

== Notable alumni ==
- John Salisbury (born 1934), Olympic athlete, 4x400m relay bronze medal Melbourne 1956, European gold medal Stockholm 1958
- William McKay Aitken (born 1934), Scottish-born Indian writer and explorer, resident in the Himalayas since 1960
- Kadeer Ali (born 1983), English cricketer
- Ian Bateman (born 1961), British academic and Professor of Environmental Economics at the University of East Anglia
- Corey Blackett-Taylor (born 1997), footballer for Derby County
- Sir David Cox (1924–2022), British statistician
- Nigel Fortune (1924–2009), British scholar of music
- Denis Howell, Baron Howell (1923–1998), British Labour Party politician, Member of Parliament (MP), and life peer
- Eddie Hughes (born 1968), Conservative Member of Parliament
- Jason John (born 1971), English athlete
- Terence Parkes (born 1934), cartoonist (Larry)
- Adil Ray (born 1974), comedian
- Mark Rowley (born 1964), Commissioner of Police of the Metropolis
- Siôn Simon (born 1968), British Labour Party politician, Member of Parliament (MP) from 2001 to 2010, Member of the European Parliament (MEP) from 2014 to 2019
- John Tooze (born 1938), scientist
- Robert Weir (born 1961), English discus and hammer thrower
- Harry B. Whittington (1916–2010), British palaeontologist and academic, Woodwardian Professor of Geology at the University of Cambridge from 1966 to 1983
- Joe Wilson (1861–1952), English footballer
