= Ian Bateman =

British economist

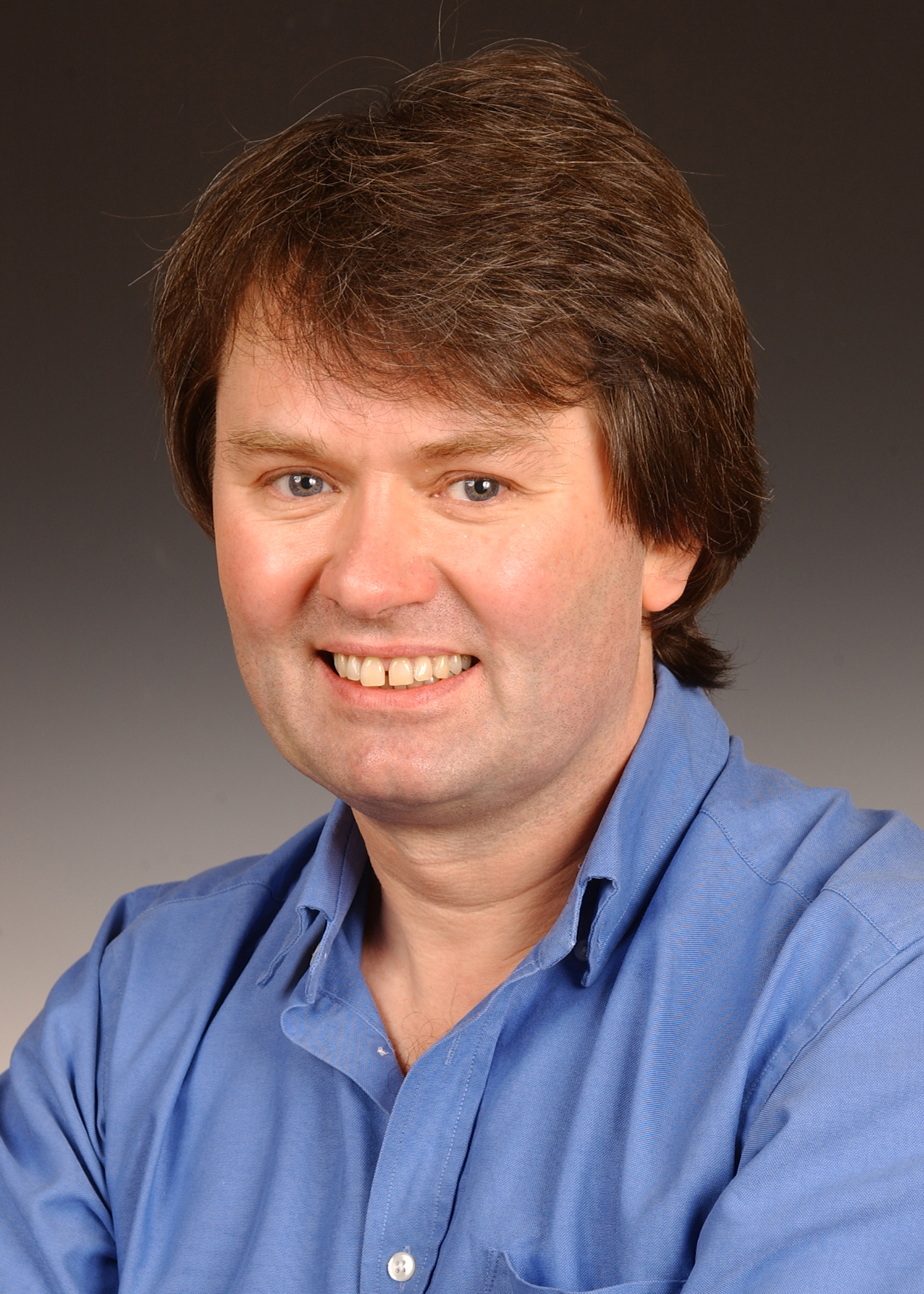
Photo of Ian Bateman

Ian Julian Bateman OBE US-NAS FBA FEAERE FRSA FRSB (born 1961) is a professor of environmental economics at the Land, Environment, Economics and Policy (LEEP) Institute at the University of Exeter. He is chief editor of the journal "Environmental and Resource Economics". He was formerly a member of the Natural Capital Committee, a member of the Defra Science Advisory Council, and director of the Centre for Social and Economic Research on the Global Environment (CSERGE).

He was educated at Handsworth Grammar School, the University of Birmingham (BSc), the University of Manchester (MA), and the University of Nottingham (PhD). He was the Principal Investigator of the ESRC Large Grant: Social, Economic and Environmental Research (SEER) and of the NERC Valuing Nature Network (VNN). He is also adjunct professor of Agricultural and Resource Economics, University of Western Australia, Perth and adjunct professor in the Department of Economics in both the University of Waikato Management School, New Zealand and at Lincoln University, New Zealand. He was Head of Economics for the UK National Ecosystem Assessment from 2009 to 2011.

== Honours / awards ==
Bateman was appointed an OBE for services to environmental science and policy in the 2013 New Year Honours. The Royal Society named him as one of 18 new Wolfson Research Merit Award holders in December 2011.

== Publications ==
- Economic analysis for the UK national ecosystem assessment: synthesis and scenario valuation of changes in ecosystem services, 2014
- Using revealed preferences to estimate the Value of Travel Time to recreation sites, 2014
- The importance of local forest benefits: Economic valuation of Non-Timber Forest Products in the Eastern Arc Mountains in Tanzania, 2013
- Sustainable intensification in agriculture: premises and policies, 2013
- A synthesis of approaches to assess and value ecosystem services in the EU in the context of TEEB, 2013
