= Burton Weisbrod =

American economist (born 1931)

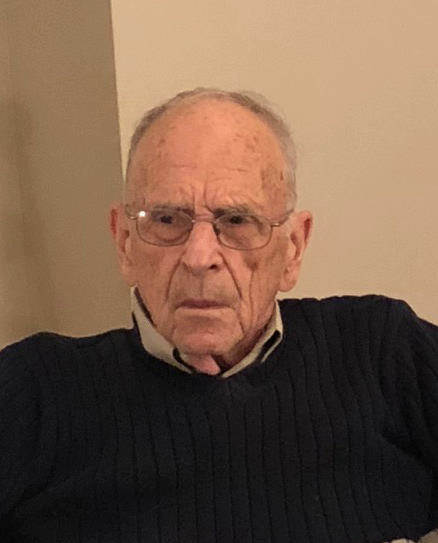
- Burton Weisbrod, 2022
- Born: February 13, 1931 (age 95); Chicago, Illinois

Academic background
- Education: University of Illinois Urbana-Champaign; Northwestern University

Academic work
- Discipline: Public economics benefit-cost analysis Nonprofit sector
- Institutions: Northwestern University; University of Wisconsin–Madison Washington University in St. Louis; Carleton College
- Notable ideas: option value (cost-benefit analysis) externality measurement nonprofit sector theory
- Awards: Lifetime Distinguished Research Award, Association for Research on Nonprofit Organizations & Voluntary Action, 1997; Carl Taube award, American Public Health Association, 1993.

Burton A. Weisbrod (born February 13, 1931, in Chicago, Illinois) is an American economist who pioneered the theory of option value, and the theory of why voluntary nonprofit organizations exist. He also developed the methodology for valuing voluntary labor. He advanced methods for benefit-cost analysis of public policy by recognizing the roles of externality effects and collective public goods in program evaluation. He applied those methods to the fields of education, health care, poverty, public interest law, and nonprofit organization. Over a career of fifty years, he published 16 books and over 200 scholarly articles. He is currently the Cardiss Collins Professor of Economics Emeritus and a Fellow of the Institute for Policy Research at Northwestern University.

== Contributions to economics ==
- Option Value – Weisbrod is acknowledged to have developed the concept and coined the term option value as used in welfare economics to represent a portion of total economic value. His 1964 article introduced the idea that individuals may derive a benefit (referred to as "option value") from having access to use of a publicly provided good or service even if they are uncertain whether or not they will actually use it. That concept has since come to be applied as an important tool in the valuation of parks, natural resources and environmental amenities, as well as access to public transit services. Economists have further identified the concept of "Weisbrodian public goods" (private goods that also have public option value, such as hospital visits), as distinguished from the classic or pure "Samuelsonian public goods."
- Economics of Poverty – Weisbrod conducted research demonstrating the externality (broader societal) benefits of public investment in education and health care in the early 1960s. That work, which showed the income growth benefits from investment in human capital, is recognized as advancing the use of benefit-cost analysis considerations in the area of public policy. That provided a justification for President Johnson's War on Poverty in the mid 1960s, which included education and health care as tools for poverty reduction. As a Senior Staff member of the President's Council of Economic Advisors in the Kennedy and Johnson administrations, Weisbrod is credited with helping define the antipoverty program strategy that later led to the Head Start Program for preschool education.
- Economics of Health Policy – Weisbrod was a pioneer in the development of benefit-cost analysis for health care. In the 1970s, he led two program evaluations that were considered path-breaking because they brought together economic, social and medical professionals to assess multi-year pilot programs. A study in the Caribbean developed the connection between health, worker productivity and economic development, and it provided support for international aid agencies to invest in disease prevention. It was followed by a study in the US that showed net cost savings and medical benefit gains from switching patients out of mental hospitals and into aggressive outpatient programs. Over the next thirty years, that finding was used as a basis for a national movement towards closing mental hospitals and replacing them with outpatient services. However, the adequacy of replacement outpatient services in controlling mental illness remains an issue of public discussion.
- Nonprofit Sector – Weisbrod developed the theory of why the voluntary sector of nonprofit organizations exist, in a seminal 1975 article. In a series of four books issued each decade from 1977 to 2008, Weisbrod further developed theory to explain the comparative economic behavior of for-profit, government, and private nonprofit organizations, and the causes and consequences of the growing commercialism of nonprofits. As part of this effort, he calculated the value of voluntary labor in the United States, which is a factor considered in the analysis of efficiency wage.

== Education ==
Weisbrod was born on February 13, 1931, in Chicago. He graduated from Von Steuben Metropolitan High School and then earned a bachelor's degree from the University of Illinois Urbana-Champaign, followed by a Ph.D. in Economics from Northwestern University.

== Career ==
Weisbrod is currently the Cardiss Collins Professor of Economics Emeritus at Northwestern University. From 1990 to 1995, Weisbrod served as director of Northwestern University's Institute for Policy Research (IPR), then known as the Center for Urban Affairs and Policy Research. Before that, he spent 26 years on the economics faculty at the University of Wisconsin–Madison where he was Evjue-Bascom Professor of Economics, Director of the Center for Health Economics and Law, and Director of the National Institute of Mental Health Training Program in Health and Mental Health Economics.

Weisbrod was appointed by then-Secretary of Health and Human Services Donna Shalala to the National Advisory Research Resources Council of the National Institutes of Health for a four-year term from 1999 to 2003. From 2000 to 2005, Weisbrod was chair of the Social Science Research Council (SSRC) Committee overseeing its program on Philanthropy and the Nonprofit Sector; from 2002 to 2005 he was a member of the National Academy of Sciences Panel on the Measurement of Nonmarket Activity, and since 2005 he has been a member of the Internal Revenue Service User Group Advisory Committee.

Weisbrod served earlier as a Senior Staff Economist on the Council of Economic Advisers under Presidents John F. Kennedy and Lyndon B. Johnson. He also previously held positions on the Economics faculty at Washington University in St. Louis and Carleton College in Minnesota. During his career, he also served as a visiting professor at the Harvard Kennedy School, Yale University, Princeton University, University of California, Berkeley, University of California, San Diego, Brandeis University, Binghamton University, the Australian National University and Autonomous University of Madrid.

== Awards and honors ==
Weisbrod was elected to the National Academy of Medicine and National Academy of Sciences. He was elected fellow of the American Association for the Advancement of Science, in addition to being elected to its Governing Council for 1998-2000. He was also elected to the Executive Committee of the American Economic Association, and served as President of the Midwest Economics Association. Other honors include being recipient of the Lifetime Distinguished Research Award from the Association for Research on Nonprofit Organizations and Voluntary Action (ARNOVA) in 1997, and receiving the Carl Taube award from the American Public Health Association in 1993 for his research on evaluation of community mental health programs.

== Works ==
=== Books ===
- Mission and Money: Understanding the University (by B. Weisbrod, J. Ballou, and E. Asch; Cambridge University Press, 2008).
- To Profit or Not to Profit: The Commercial Transformation of the Nonprofit Sector (B. Weisbrod, ed.; Cambridge University Press, 1998).
- The Urban Crisis: Linking Research to Action (B. Weisbrod and J. C. Worthy, eds.; Northwestern University Press, 1997)
- The Nonprofit Economy (by B. Weisbrod; Harvard University Press, 1988).
- Economics and Medical Research (by B. Weisbrod; American Enterprise Institute, 1983).
- Human Resources, Employment and Development, v.3: The Problems of Developed Countries and the International Economy (B. Weisbrod and H.Hughes, eds; MacMillan, London, 1983)
- Economics and Mental Health (T. McGuire and B. Weisbrod, eds; National Institute of Mental Health, 1981).
- Public Interest Law: An Economic and Institutional Analysis (by B. Weisbrod, J. Handler and N. Komesar; Univ. of California Press, 1978)
- The Voluntary Nonprofit Sector: An Economic Analysis (by B. Weisbrod; Lexington Books, 1978).
- Disease and Economic Development: The Case of Parasitic Diseases (by B. Weisbrod, R. Andreano, R. Baldwin, E. Epstein, and A. Kelley; University of Wisconsin Press, 1974)
- American Health Policy: Perspectives and Choices (by R. Andreano and B. Weisbrod; Markham Publishing, 1974)
- The Daily Economist (H. Johnson and B. Weisbrod, eds; Prentice-Hall, 1973).
- Benefits, Costs, and Finance of Public Higher Education (by W. L. Hansen and B. Weisbrod; Markham Publishing, 1969).
- The Economics of Poverty (Burton Weisbrod, ed.; Prentice-Hall, 1965).
- External Benefits of Public Education (by B. Weisbrod; Princeton University, 1964).
- Economics of Public Health (by B. Weisbrod; Univ. of Pennsylvania Press, 1961).

=== Scholarly articles ===
Weisbrod authored over 200 scholarly journal articles. A list can be accessed via his Northwestern University web page.
