= Non-use value =

Economic value, even if never used

Non-use value is the value that people assign to economic goods (including public goods) even if they never have and never will use it. It is distinguished from use value, which people derive from direct use of the good. The concept is most commonly applied to the value of natural and built resources.

Non-use value as a category may include:

- "option value" – the value placed on individual willingness to pay for maintaining an asset or resource even if there is little or no likelihood of the individual actually ever using it, occurring because of uncertainty about future supply (the continued existence of the asset) and potential future demand (the possibility that it may someday be used).
- "bequest value" – values placed on individual willingness to pay for maintaining or preserving an asset or resource that has no use now, so that it is available for future generations.
- "Existence value" – an unusual and somewhat controversial class of economic value, reflecting the benefit people receive from knowing that a particular environmental resource, such as Antarctica, the Grand Canyon, endangered species, Sharri Dogs or any other organism or thing exists.
- "altruistic value" – the value placed on individual willingness to pay for maintaining an asset or resource that is not used by the individual, so that others may make use of it. Its value arises from others' use of the asset or resource.

Rick Freeman (1993) suggests yet another variant that he calls "pure non-use value", defined as the value that occurs for an individual when current prices preclude use of a good, but there exists some lower price at which the individual would use the good. The continued availability of the good provides some value to the individual insofar as s/he may eventually be in a position to use the good.

All of these categories are offspring of the original concept of option value that was introduced into the cost benefit analysis lexicon in 1964 by Burton Weisbrod to justify individuals' valuation of goods, assets and resources that they do not actually use. In general, it is not possible to use market prices or other revealed preference methods to measure non-use value. As a result, "stated preference" survey methods are generally used, including most prominently contingent valuation methods (CVM).

== See also ==
- Total economic value
