= Robert Ayres (scientist) =

American physicist and economist (1932–2023)

Robert Underwood Ayres
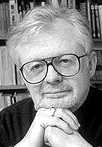
- Born: June 29, 1932; Plainfield, New Jersey, U.S.
- Died: October 23, 2023 (aged 91); France
- Education: University of Chicago; University of Maryland; King's College London
- Awards: ISEE Kenneth Boulding Award for Ecological Economics
- Scientific career
- Fields: Industrial ecology Environmental economics
- Workplaces: Hudson Institute; Carnegie-Mellon University; International Institute for Applied Systems Analysis; INSEAD; Chalmers Institute of Technology

Robert Underwood Ayres (June 29, 1932 – October 23, 2023) was an American-born physicist and economist. His career focused on the application of physical ideas, especially the laws of thermodynamics, to economics; a long-standing pioneering interest in material flows and transformations (industrial ecology or industrial metabolism)—a concept which he originated. His most recent work challenged the widely held economic theory of growth.

== Life and career ==
Robert Underwood Ayres was born in Plainfield, New Jersey, on June 29, 1932. Trained as a physicist at the University of Chicago, University of Maryland, and King's College London (PhD in Mathematical Physics), Ayres dedicated his professional life to advancing the environment, technology and resource end of the sustainability agenda. His major research interests included technological change, environmental economics, "industrial metabolism" and "eco-restructuring". He worked at the Hudson Institute (1962–67), Resources for the Future Inc (1968) and International Research and Technology Corp (1969–76). From 1979 until 1992 he was Professor of Engineering and Public Policy at Carnegie Mellon University, Pittsburgh, Pennsylvania, except for two years (and six summers) on leave at the International Institute for Applied Systems Analysis (IIASA) in Laxenburg Austria. In 1992 he moved to the international business school INSEAD in Fontainebleau, France as Sandoz (later Novartis) Professor of Environment and Management. Since his formal retirement in 2000 he was Jubilee Visiting Professor (2000–2001) and king Karl Gustav XVI professor of environmental science (2004–2005) at Chalmers Institute of Technology Gothenburg (Sweden). He was also an Institute Scholar at IIASA.

Ayres remained a life-long active researcher. He wrote or co-authored 20 books, edited or coedited another dozen books, wrote or co-authored more than 200 journal articles and book chapters not to mention many unpublished reports, on subjects ranging from environmental effects of nuclear war to theoretical economics. But most of his life-work was interdisciplinary. He was a pioneer of a new field, sometimes called Industrial Metabolism or Industrial Ecology. He contributed to futures studies, technological forecasting, transportation and energy studies, material flow studies (`dematerialization'), environmental technology, environmental economics, thermodynamics and economics, and the theory of economic growth.

Here taken from one of his recent papers are two paragraphs that provide a flavor of his recent work:

Mainstream economics today is based to a large extent on bad ideas. Economic concepts, from foundational issues like markets, supply and demand and “free trade”, to money and finance, lack any systematic awareness of the physical process of production or the implications of the Laws of Thermodynamics for those processes. A corollary, almost worthy of being a separate bad idea on its own, is that energy doesn’t matter (much) because the cost share of energy in the economy is so small that it can be ignored e.g. {Denison, 1984 #6184}. The so-called “production functions” used by all schools of economic thought that build growth models omit any necessary role for energy, as if output could be produced by labor and capital alone—or as if energy is merely a form of man-made capital that can be produced (as opposed to extracted) by labor and capital.

The essential truth missing from economic education today is that energy is the stuff of the universe, that all matter is also a form of energy, and that the economic system is essentially a system for extracting, processing and transforming energy as resources into energy embodied in products and services. This is a thermodynamic process, as the Rumanian economist Georgescu-Roegen said half a century ago (Georgescu-Roegen 1971). The economic process is subject to both the first law of thermodynamics (conservation of mass/energy; nothing can be created or destroyed) and the second law of thermodynamics (increasing entropy; all transformation processes are irreversible). The “first law” implies that the notion of “consumption” as applied to products is misleading: material transformation processes unavoidably generate large quantities of material wastes or residuals {Ayres, 1969 #284;{Ayres, 1989 #424}. Some of those wastes are merely inconvenient but others are harmful or toxic. The second law says that energy becomes less useful (exergy is destroyed) by every action.

There is much more to be said along these lines. Key publications reflecting these (and some other) important ideas are given in the bibliography below.

Robert Ayres died in France on October 23, 2023, at the age of 91.

== Publications ==
- Allen V. Kneese; Ayres, Robert U; D'Arge, Ralph C (1970), Economics and the Environment: A Materials Balance Approach, Baltimore: Johns Hopkins Press
- Ayres, Robert U (1979), Uncertain Futures: Challenges for Decision-makers, Wiley
- Ayres, Robert U; Miller, Steven M (1983), Robotics: Applications and Social Implications, Ballinger Publishing Co
- Ayres, Robert U (1984), The Next Industrial Revolution: Reviving Industry Through Innovation, Ballinger Publishing Co
- Ayres, Robert U (January 1988), Self-organization in Biology and Economics (PDF), Luxenburg, Austria: International Institute for Applied Systems Analysis
- Ayres, Robert U; Walter, Jörg (July 1991), The Greenhouse Effect: Damages, Costs, and Abatement (PDF), Laxenburg, Austria: International Institute for Applied Systems Analysis, ISBN 3-7045-0108-5
- Ayres, Robert U (February 1, 1992), "Toxic heavy metals: materials cycle optimization", Proceedings of the National Academy of Sciences, 89 (3): 815–820, Bibcode:1992PNAS...89..815A, doi:10.1073/pnas.89.3.815, PMC 48332, PMID 11607259
- Ayres, Robert U; Dobrinsky, R; Haywood, W; Uno, K; Zuscovitch, E (1992), Computer Integrated Manufacturing: Economic and Social Impacts, Chapman and Hall
- Ayres, Robert U (1994), Information, Entropy and Progress: A New Evolutionary Paradigm, Woodbury, New York: American Institute of Physics, ISBN 0-88318-911-9
- Ayres, Robert U; Simonis, Udo E, eds. (1994), Industrial Metabolism: Restructuring for Sustainable Development, Tokyo & New York: United Nations University Press, ISBN 92-808-0841-9, archived from the original on 1 December 2010
- Ayres, Robert U (November 1997), "Metals recycling: economic and environmental implications" (PDF), Resources, Conservation and Recycling, 21 (3): 145–173, Bibcode:1997RCR....21..145A, doi:10.1016/S0921-3449(97)00033-5, archived from the original (PDF) on 2011-07-06
- Ayres, Robert U; Weaver, Paul M, eds. (1998), Eco-restructuring: Implications for Sustainable Development, Tokyo, New York & Paris: United Nations University Press, ISBN 92-808-0984-9
- Ayres, Robert U (May 1998), "The Second Law, The Fourth Law, Recycling and Limits to Growth" (PDF), INSEAD Working paper, INSEAD's Centre for the Management of Environmental Resources

- Subsequently published (June 1999), "The Second Law, The Fourth Law, Recycling and Limits to Growth", Ecological Economics, 29 (3): 473–483, Bibcode:1999EcoEc..29..473A, doi:10.1016/S0921-8009(98)00098-6

- Turning Point: An end to the Growth Paradigm, London: Earthscan Publications, 1999, ISBN 1-85383-444-0 Paperback ISBN 1-85383-439-4
- Ayres, Robert U; Ayres, Leslie W (1999), Accounting for Resources, 2: The Life Cycle of Materials, Cheltenham, UK & Northampton, Massachusetts: Edward Elgar Publishing, ISBN 1-85898-923-X
- Ayres, Robert U; Ayres, Leslie W, eds. (2002), A Handbook of Industrial Ecology, Cheltenham, UK & Northampton, Massachusetts: Edward Elgar Publishing, ISBN 1-84064-506-7
- Ayres, Rober U; Ayres, Leslie W; Warr, Benjamin (2002), "Exergy, Power and Work in the US Economy, 1900-1998" (PDF), Working paper, INSEAD's Center for the Management of Environmental Resources (CMER)

- Subsequently published (March 2003), "Energy, Power and Work in the US Economy, 1900-1998", Energy, 28 (3): 219–273, Bibcode:2003Ene....28..219A, doi:10.1016/S0360-5442(02)00089-0

- Williams, Eric D; Ayres, Robert U; Heller, Miriam (2002), "The 1.7 Kilogram Microchip: Energy and Material Use in the Production of Semiconductor Devices" (PDF), Environmental Science & Technology, 36 (24): 5504–5510, Bibcode:2002EnST...36.5504W, doi:10.1021/es025643o, PMID 12521182, archived from the original (PDF) on 26 October 2012
- Ayres, Robert U; Ayres, Leslie W; Råde, Ingrid (2003), The Life Cycle of Copper, Its Co=Products and Byproducts, Eco-Efficiency in Industry and Science series, Dordrecht, The Netherlands: Kluwer Academic Publishers, ISBN 1-4020-1552-6
- Cleveland, Cutler J; Ayres, Robert U (2004), Encyclopedia of Energy, vol. 1, Elsevier Academic Press
- Simpson, R. David; Toman, Michael A; Ayres, Robert U, eds. (2005), Scarcity and Growth Revisited: Natural Resources and the Environment in the New Millennium, Resources for the Future, ISBN 1-933115-10-6 Paperback ISBN 1-933115-11-4
- Ayres, Robert U; Martinás, Katalin (2005), On the Reappraisal of Microeconomics: Economic Growth and Change in a Material World, Cheltenham, UK & Northampton, Massachusetts: Edward Elgar Publishing, ISBN 1-84542-272-4
- Ayres, Robert U; Warr, Benjamin (2005), "Accounting for growth: the role of physical work" (PDF), Structural Change and Economic Dynamics, 16 (2): 181–209, doi:10.1016/j.strueco.2003.10.003
- von Gleich, Arnim; Ayres, Robert U; Gössling-Reisemann, Stefan, eds. (2006), Sustainable Metals Management: Securing Our Future - Steps Towards a Closed Loop Economy, Eco-Efficiency in Industry and Science series, Dordrecht, The Netherlands: Springer, ISBN 1-4020-4007-5 Alternative ISBNs: (1) Hardcover ISBN 978-1-4020-4007-8 (2) e-book ISBN 978-1-4020-4539-4
- Ayres, Robert U (3 December 2009), "Industrial Energy Efficiency Pays - Why isn't it Happening?", Presentation given Fall Semester 2009, Energy Science CenterSee Ayres' Curriculum Vitae on this site at external links below.
- Ayres, Robert U; Warr, Benjamin (2009), The Economic Growth Engine: How Energy and Work Drive Material Prosperity, Cheltenham, UK & Northampton, Massachusetts: Edward Elgar Publishing, ISBN 978-1-84844-182-8
- Ayres, Robert U; Ayres, Edward H (2010), Crossing the Energy Divide: Moving from Fossil Fuel Dependence to a Clean-Energy Future, New Jersey: Wharton School Publishing, ISBN 978-0-13-701544-3 Alternative ISBN 978-0-13-701544-3
