= Ecological goods and services =

Economic benefits associated with ecosystems

Ecological goods and services (EG&S) are the economic benefits (goods and services) arising from the ecological functions of ecosystems. Such benefits accrue to all living organisms, including animals and plants, rather than to humans alone. However, there is a growing recognition of the importance to society that ecological goods and services provide for health, social, cultural, and economic needs.

== Introduction ==
Examples of ecological goods include clean air, and abundant fresh water. Examples of ecological services include purification of air and water, maintenance of biodiversity, decomposition of wastes, soil and vegetation generation and renewal, pollination of crops and natural vegetation, groundwater recharge through wetlands, seed dispersal, greenhouse gas mitigation, and aesthetically pleasing landscapes. The products and processes of ecological goods and services are complex and occur over long periods of time. They are a sub-category of public goods.

The concern over ecological goods and services arises because we are losing them at an unsustainable rate, and therefore land use managers must devise a host of tools to encourage the provision of more ecological goods and services. Rural and suburban settings are especially important, as lands that are developed and converted from their natural state lose their ecological functions. Therefore, ecological goods and services provided by privately held lands become increasingly important.

== Markets ==
A market may be created wherein ecological goods and services are demanded by society and supplied by public and private landowners. Some believe that public lands alone are not adequate to supply this market, and that privately held lands are needed to close this gap. What has emerged is the notion that rural landowners who provide ecological goods and services to society through good stewardship practices on their land should be duly compensated. The main tool to accomplish this to date has been to pay farmers directly to set-aside portions of their land that would otherwise be in production. This exemplifies a shift in thinking from the "polluter pays" to the "beneficiary pays".

Financial incentives to landowners is one approach, but provision of EG&S can also be achieved through regulation, stewardship incentives under existing programs such Environmental Farm Plans, market-based instruments, and tax rebates.

== Biodiversity and EGS ==
According to the Millennium Ecosystem Assessment project, biodiversity is a necessary underlying component of ecological goods and services. Biodiversity supports ecological goods and services such as biological control and genetic resources. Biodiversity is also sometimes referred to as an actual ecological good or service in its own right.

== Policy tools ==
The following policy tools can be used to ensure production of ecological goods and services: (in French)

- Regulations
- Cross compliance programs
- Environmental marketing schemes (e.g. eco-labeling)
- Voluntary participation programs
- Market based approaches (e.g. offset credits)
- One time direct payments
- Ongoing direct payments

== See also ==
- Ecosystem services
- Ecosystem valuation
- Globally Important Agricultural Heritage Systems (GIAHS)
