= Colin Mayer =

Colin Peter Mayer CBE FBA was the Peter Moores Professor of Management Studies at the Saïd Business School at the University of Oxford. He was the Peter Moores Dean of the Saïd Business School between 2006 and 2011. He is a fellow of the British Academy, a fellow of the European Corporate Governance Institute, a fellow of the Royal Society of Arts, and a research fellow of the Centre for Economic Policy Research. He is a professorial fellow of Wadham College, Oxford, an honorary fellow of St. Anne's College, Oxford, and an honorary fellow of Oriel College, Oxford. He is an ordinary member of the Competition Appeal Tribunal and was a member of the UK government Natural Capital Committee. Over the last decade he has made the case against narrow shareholder value maximization by business firms and instead promoted the broader view of business purpose to promote economic and social well-being.

== Current Activities ==
Colin Mayer has degrees in engineering science and economics (BA, First Class, 1974) and economics (BPhil, 1976; DPhil, 1981) from the University of Oxford. He is Academic Lead of the Future of the Corporation programme at the British Academy, board member of the European Corporate Governance Institute (ECGI) in Brussels, and a director of the Finance Research Programme at the International Growth Centre, a research centre based jointly at The London School of Economics and Political Science and the University of Oxford. He researches in the fields of corporate finance, governance, regulation and taxation and has worked on international comparisons of financial systems and corporate governance and their effects on the financing and control of corporations.

Mayer was appointed Commander of the Order of the British Empire (CBE) in the 2017 New Year Honours for services to business education and the administration of justice in the economic sphere.

== Previous Activities ==
Colin Mayer has previously been chairman of the European Science Foundation Network in Financial Markets, co-director of the Centre for Economic Policy Research's Network in Financial Market and a member of the executive committee of the Royal Economic Society. He was until 2005 the director of the Oxford Financial Research Centre. He was a lecturer in economics at St Anne's College, Oxford (1980–1986), professor of corporate finance at City University (now Cass) Business School (1987–1992), and professor of economics and finance at Warwick University (1992–1994). He was a Harkness Fellow at Harvard University (1979/80), a Houblon-Norman Fellow at the Bank of England (1989) and the first Leo Goldschmidt Visiting Professor in Corporate Governance at the Solvay Business School, Université libre de Bruxelles (2000 and 2001). He was a director of OXERA, an economics consultancy firm, from 1986 to 2010 and a governor of St Paul's School in London from 2002 until 2011.

== Publications ==
- New Issues in Corporate Finance, European Economic Review, 1988.
- Asymmetric Information, Corporate Finance and Economic Development, in G. Hubbard, Financial Systems, Corporate Finance and Economic Development, NBER 1990.
- Ownership and Control of Germany Corporations, with J. Franks, Review of Financial Studies, 2001.
- Finance, Investment and Growth, with W. Carlin, Journal of Financial Economics, 2003.
- Firm Commitment: Why the Corporation is Failing Us and How to Restore Trust in It, Oxford University Press, 2013.
- Prosperity: Better Business Makes the Greater Good, Oxford: Oxford University Press, 2018.
