= John V. Krutilla =

American economist

John Vasil Krutilla (February 13, 1922 – June 27, 2003) was an American environmental economist, known for inventing the concept of existence value, the idea that undisturbed wilderness has economic value ("nonuse value"). According to Kenneth Arrow,

"John Krutilla can fairly be said to have created or stimulated most of the agenda of modern environmental economics. . . . He pioneered in developing the idea later called 'existence value,' the value generated by the mere existence of an amenity, such as an unspoiled wilderness or species of animal or plants."

Krutilla was born in Tacoma, Washington; his parents were farmers who had immigrated there from Slovakia. After serving in the U.S. Coast Guard during World War II, he earned a bachelor's degree in economics from Reed College in 1949, a master's degree from Harvard University in 1951, and a Ph.D. from Harvard in 1952. He worked from 1952 to 1955 at the Tennessee Valley Authority, before going to Resources for the Future where he worked until his retirement in 1988.

In Krutilla's essay, "Conservation Reconsidered," he introduced the idea of existence value.

With Allen V. Kneese, he was the inaugural winner of the Volvo Environment Prize in 1990.
