= Allen V. Kneese =

American economist

Allen Victor Kneese (5 April 1930, Fredericksburg, Texas - 14 March 2001) was an American economist. He was a pioneer in what came to be called environmental economics. He worked at Resources for the Future from 1961 onwards. He earned a Bachelor of Science in economics from Southwest Texas State College in San Marcos, master's degree in economics from the University of Colorado Boulder, and a Ph.D. in 1956 from Indiana University Bloomington.

Kneese' research focussed on the integration of environmental pollution in economic models, and on the use of economic incentives to encourage environmental improvements.

Kneese was the first president of the Association of Environmental and Resource Economists, and was a founding editor of the Journal of Environmental Economics and Management and Water Resources Research. With John V. Krutilla, he was the inaugural winner of the Volvo Environment Prize in 1990.

== Publications ==
- Allen V. Kneese; Blair T. Bower (1968). Managing Water Quality: Economics, Technology, Institutions. Johns Hopkins University Press for Resources for the Future.
- Allen V. Kneese (1964). The Economics of Regional Water Quality Management. Johns Hopkins University Press for Resources for the Future.
- Ayres, Robert U.; Kneese, Allen V. (June 1969). "Production, Consumption, and Externalities". American Economic Review. 59 (3): 282–297. JSTOR 1808958.
- Kneese, Allan V., Robert U. Ayres and Ralph C. d'Arge (1970). Economics and the Environment - A Materials Balance Approach. RFF Press ISBN 9781315682136
- Kneese, Allen V. (May 1971). "Environmental Pollution: Economics and Policy". American Economic Review. 61 (2): 153–166. JSTOR 1816988.
- Kneese, Allen V. (December 1972). "Pollution and Pricing". American Economic Review. 62 (5): 958.
- Orris Clemens Herfindahl; Allen V. Kneese (1974). Economic theory of natural resources. Merrill. ISBN 978-0-675-08895-4.
- Löf, George; Kneese, Allen V. (1993). Economics of Water Utilization. RFF Press.
- Kneese, Allan V. (1995). Natural Resource Economics. Edward Elgar ISBN 9781858981734
