= Natural capital =

World's stock of natural resources

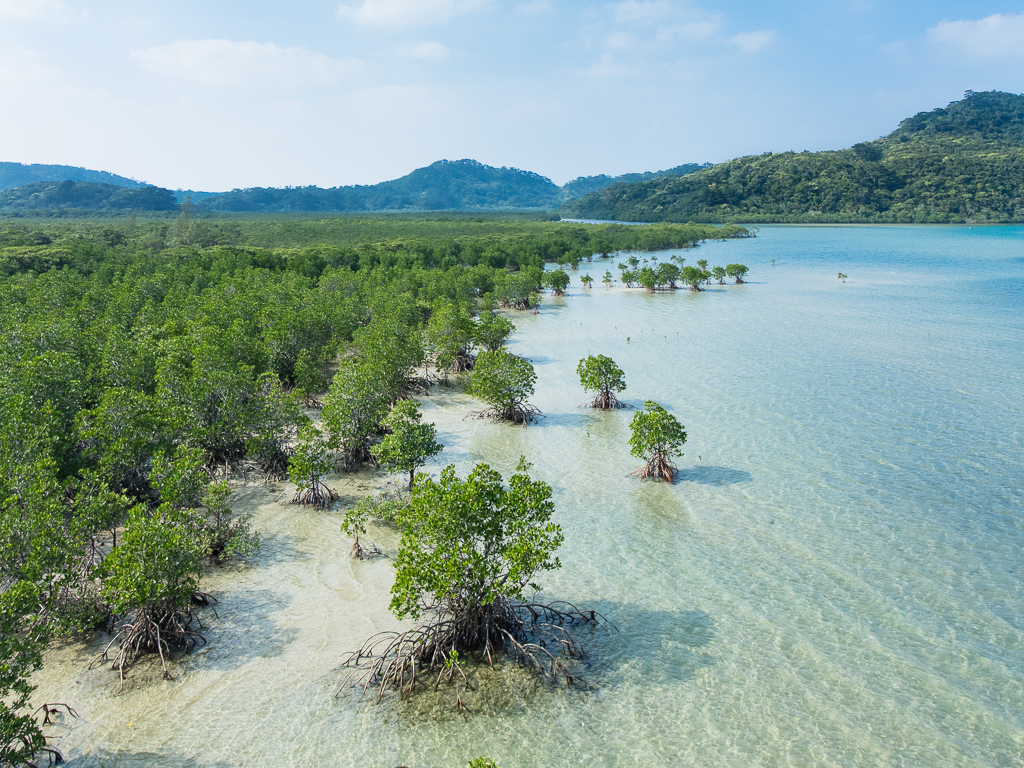
Mangrove swamp at Iriomote Island, Japan, providing beneficial services of sediment accumulation, coastal protection, nursery and fish-spawning grounds which may in turn support coastal fishing communities. At least 35% of the world's stock of mangrove swamps was destroyed in the past 20 years.

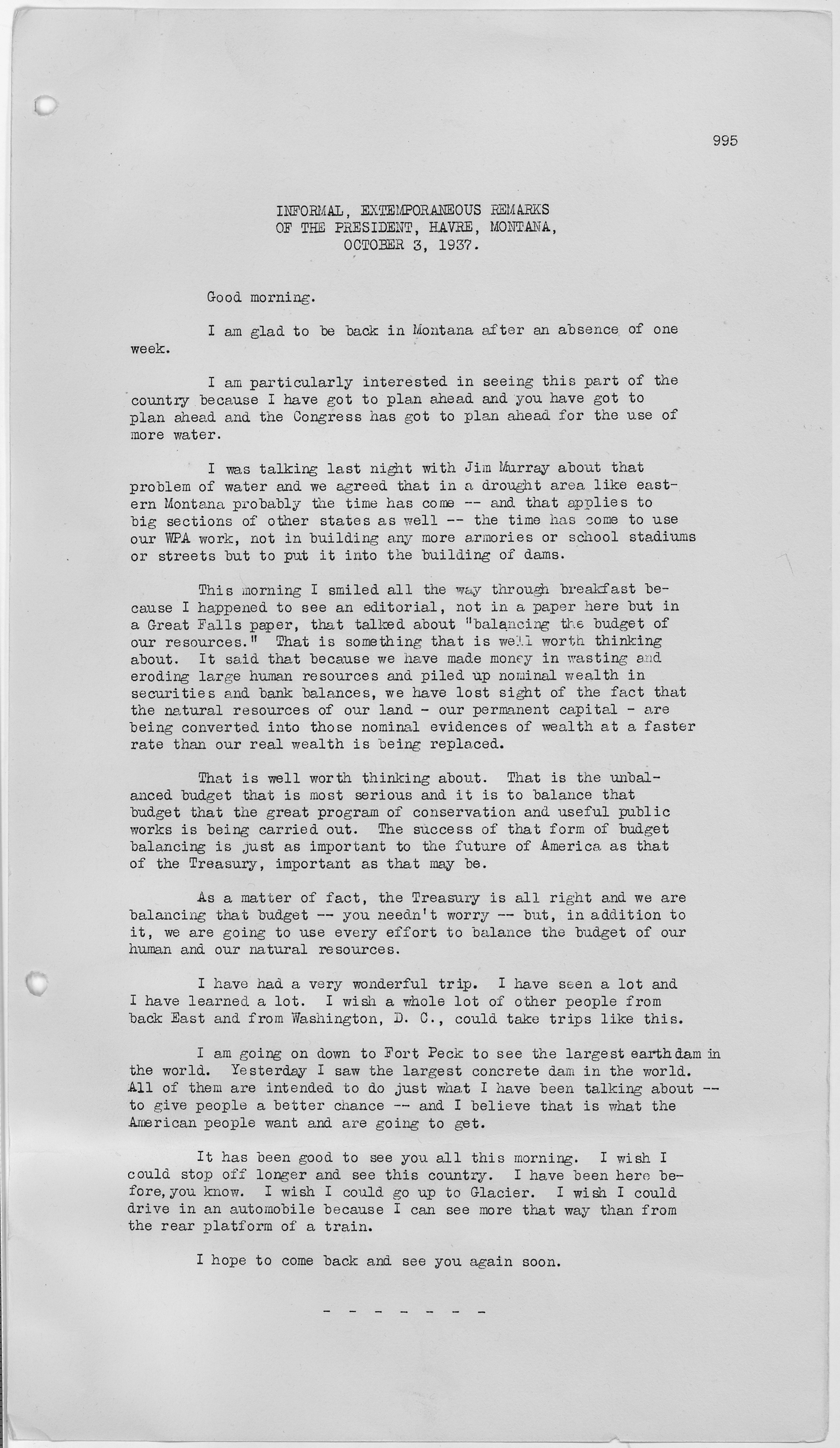
Remarks from 1937 by FDR on "natural capital" and "balancing the budget of our resources"

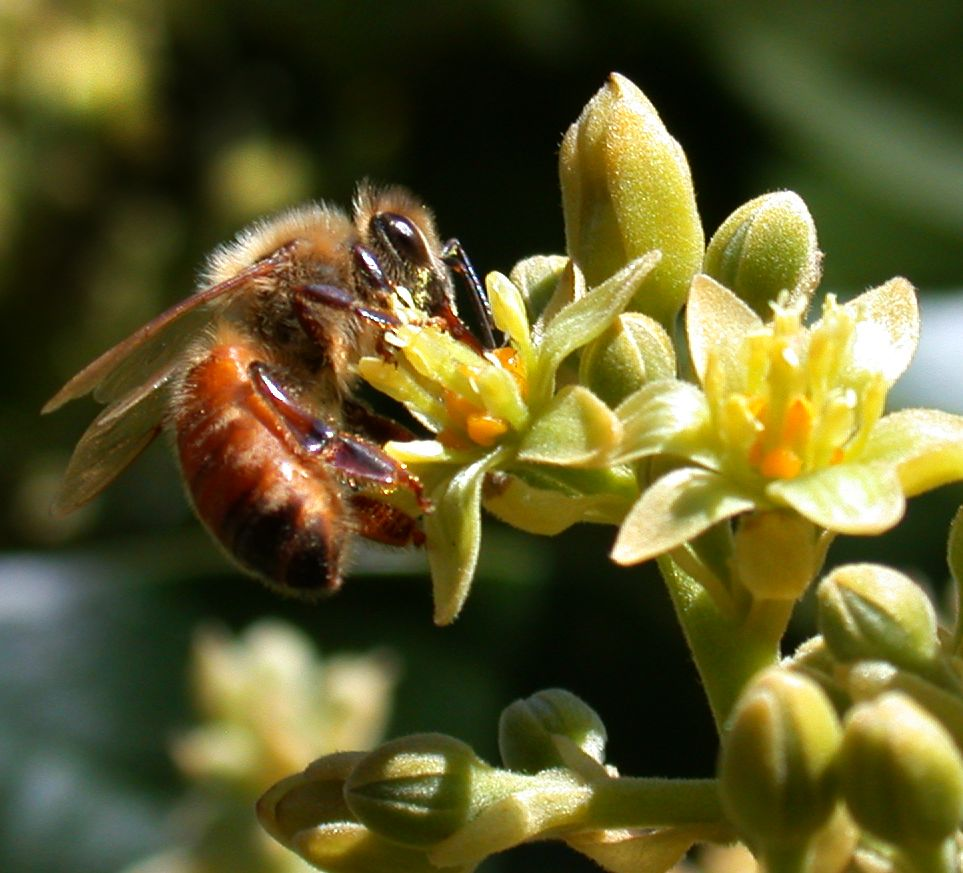
Honeybee (Apis mellifera) pollinating an Avocado crop. Healthy stocks of wild and cultivated pollinator species are important to support the farming industry and help ensure food security.

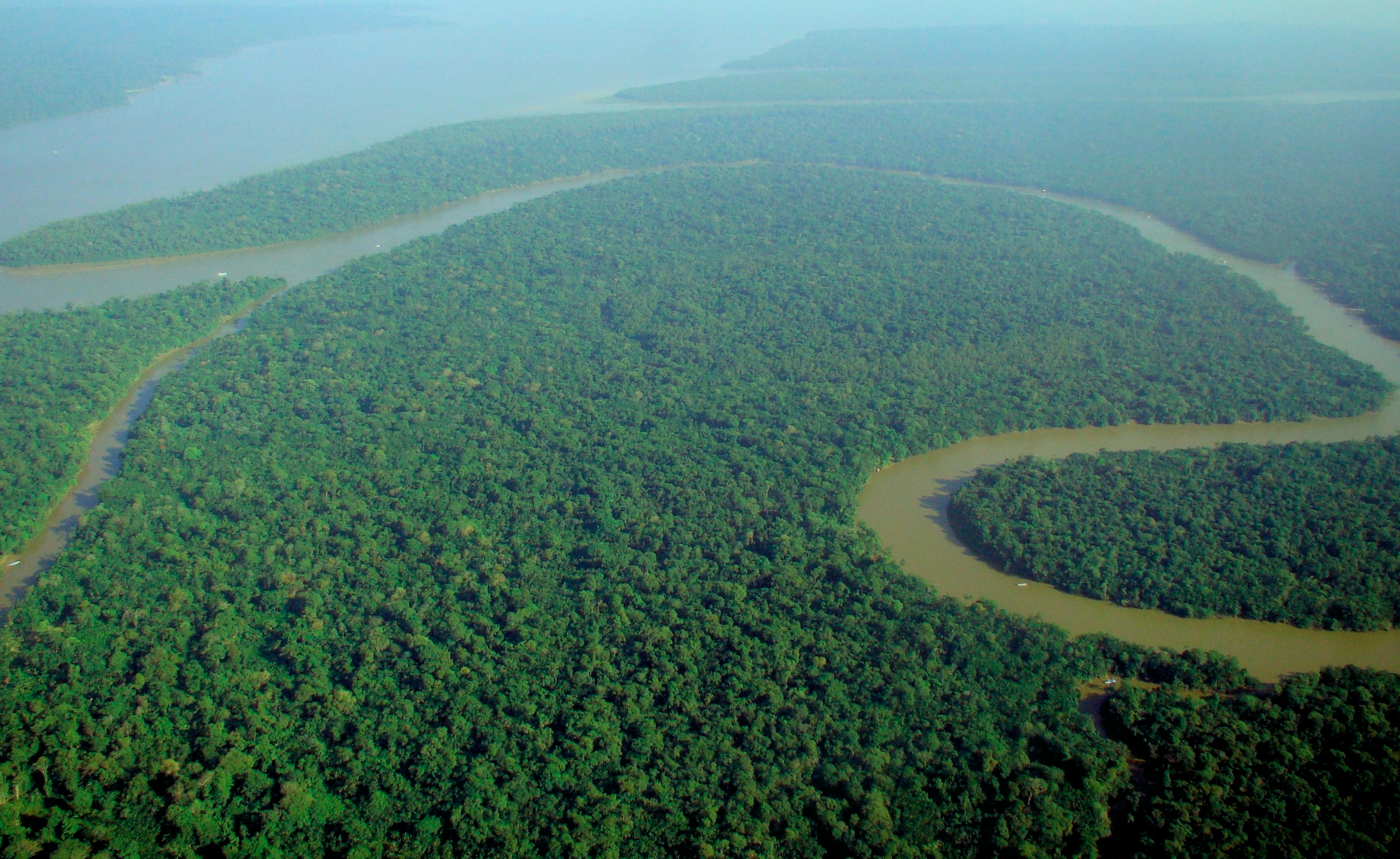
Aerial view of the Amazon Rainforest. Looked at as a natural capital asset, rainforests provide air and water regulation services, potential sources of new medicines and natural carbon sequestration.

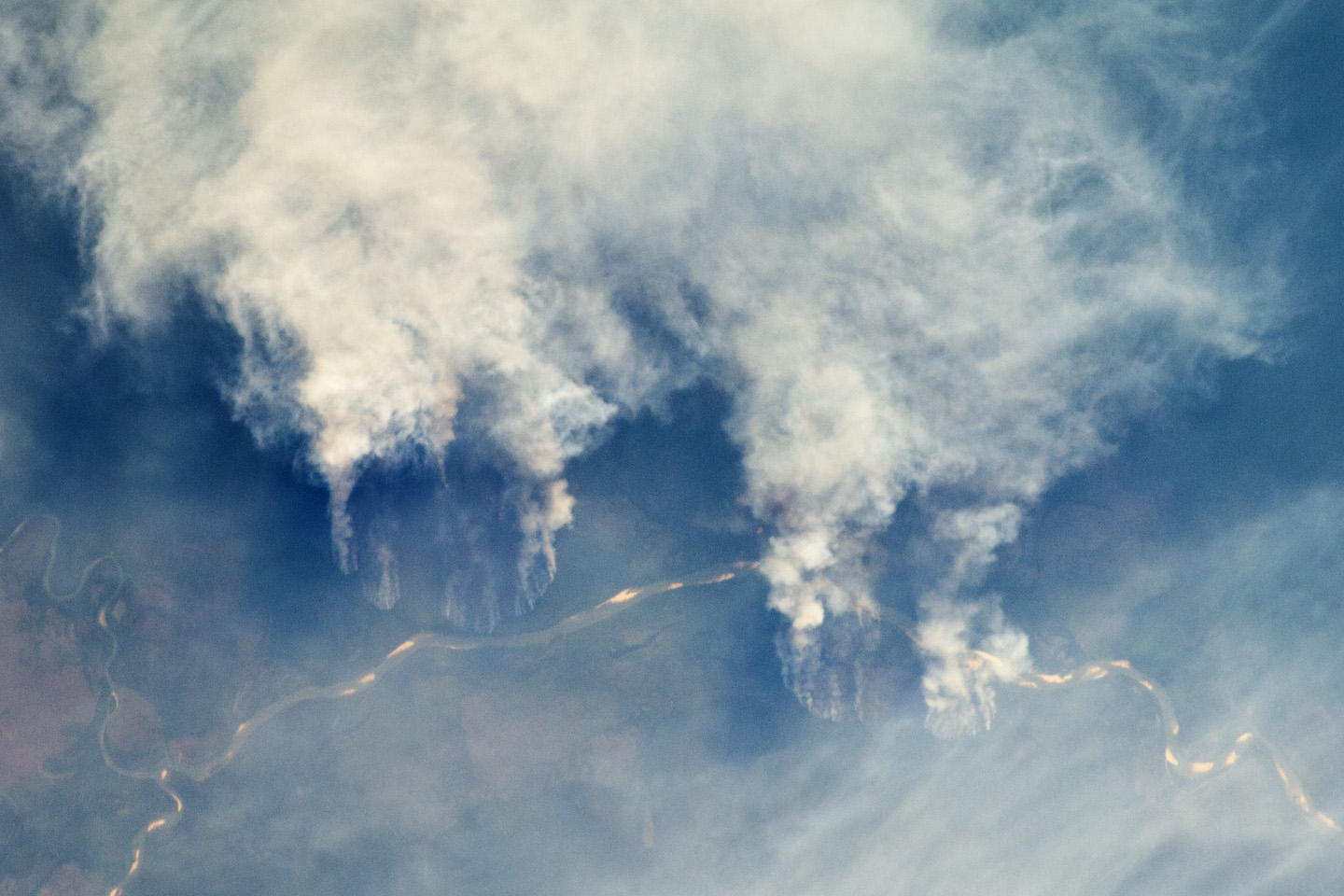
Fires along the Rio Xingu, Brazil – NASA Earth Observatory. Loss of natural capital assets may have significant impact on local and global economies, as well as on the climate.

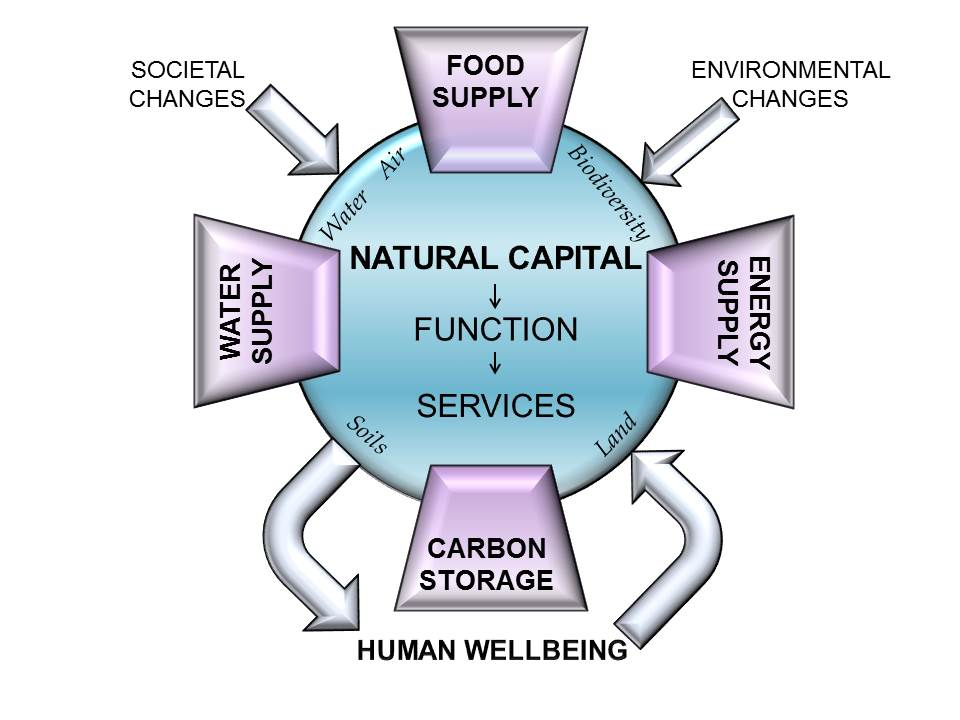
The many components of natural capital can be viewed as providing essential goods and ecosystem services which underpin some of our key global issues, such as food and water supply, minimising climate change and meeting energy needs.

Natural capital is the world's stock of natural resources, which includes geology, soils, air, water and all living organisms. Some natural capital assets provide people with free goods and services, often called ecosystem services. All of these underpin our economy and society, and thus make human life possible.

It is an extension of the economic notion of capital (resources which enable the production of more resources) to goods and services provided by the natural environment. For example, a well-maintained forest or river may provide an indefinitely sustainable flow of new trees or fish, whereas over-use of those resources may lead to a permanent decline in timber availability or fish stocks. Natural capital also provides people with essential services, like water catchment, erosion control and crop pollination by insects, which in turn ensure the long-term viability of other natural resources. Since the continuous supply of services from the available natural capital assets is dependent upon a healthy, functioning environment, the structure and diversity of habitats and ecosystems are important components of natural capital. Methods, called 'natural capital asset checks', help decision-makers understand how changes in the current and future performance of natural capital assets will impact human well-being and the economy. Unpriced natural capital is what we refer to when businesses or individuals exploit or abuse nature without being held accountable, which can harm ecosystems and the environment.

== History of the concept ==
The term 'natural capital' was first used in 1973 by E. F. Schumacher in his book Small Is Beautiful and was developed further by Herman Daly, Robert Costanza, and other founders of the science of Ecological Economics, as part of a comprehensive critique of the shortcomings of conventional economics. Natural capital is a concept central to economic assessment ecosystem services valuation which revolves around the idea, that non-human life produces goods and services that are essential to life. Thus, natural capital is essential to the sustainability of the economy.

In a traditional economic analysis of the factors of production, natural capital would usually be classified as "land" distinct from traditional "capital". The historical distinction between "land" and "capital" defined "land" as naturally occurring with a fixed supply, whereas "capital", as originally defined referred only to man-made goods. (e.g., Georgism) It is, however, misleading to view "land" as if its productive capacity is fixed, because natural capital can be improved or degraded by the actions of man over time (see Environmental degradation). Moreover, natural capital yields benefits and goods, such as timber or food, which can be harvested by humans. These benefits are similar to those realized by owners of infrastructural capital which yields more goods, such as a factory that produces automobiles just as an apple tree produces apples.

Ecologists are teaming up with economists to measure and express values of the wealth of ecosystems as a way of finding solutions to the biodiversity crisis. Some researchers have attempted to place a dollar figure on ecosystem services such as the value that the Canadian boreal forest's contribution to global ecosystem services. If ecologically intact, the boreal forest has an estimated value of US$3.7 trillion. The boreal forest ecosystem is one of the planet's great atmospheric regulators and it stores more carbon than any other biome on the planet. The annual value for ecological services of the Boreal Forest is estimated at US$93.2 billion, or 2.5 greater than the annual value of resource extraction.

The economic value of 17 ecosystem services for the entire biosphere (calculated in 1997) has an estimated average value of US$33 trillion per year. These ecological economic values are not currently included in calculations of national income accounts, the GDP and they have no price attributes because they exist mostly outside of the global markets. The loss of natural capital continues to accelerate and goes undetected or ignored by mainstream monetary analysis.

Within the international community the basic principle is not controversial, although much uncertainty exists over how best to value different aspects of ecological health, natural capital and ecosystem services. Full-cost accounting, triple bottom line, measuring well-being and other proposals for accounting reform often include suggestions to measure an "ecological deficit" or "natural deficit" alongside a social and financial deficit. It is difficult to measure such a deficit without some agreement on methods of valuation and auditing of at least the global forms of natural capital (e.g. value of air, water, soil).

All uses of the term currently differentiate natural from man-made or infrastructural capital in some way. Indicators adopted by United Nations Environment Programme's World Conservation Monitoring Centre and the Organisation for Economic Co-operation and Development (OECD) to measure natural biodiversity use the term in a slightly more specific way. According to the OECD, natural capital is "natural assets in their role of providing natural resource inputs and environmental services for economic production" and is "generally considered to comprise three principal categories: natural resources stocks, land, and ecosystems."

The concept of "natural capital" has also been used by the Biosphere 2 project, and the Natural Capitalism economic model of Paul Hawken, Amory Lovins, and Hunter Lovins. Recently, it has begun to be used by politicians, notably Ralph Nader, Paul Martin Jr., and agencies of the UK government, including its Natural Capital Committee and the London Health Observatory.

In Natural Capitalism: Creating the Next Industrial Revolution the author claims that the "next industrial revolution" depends on the espousal of four central strategies: "the conservation of resources through more effective manufacturing processes, the reuse of materials as found in natural systems, a change in values from quantity to quality, and investing in natural capital, or restoring and sustaining natural resources."

== Natural capital declaration ==
In June 2012 a 'natural capital declaration' (NCD) was launched at the Rio+20 summit held in Brazil. An initiative of the global finance sector, it was signed by 40 CEOs to 'integrate natural capital considerations into loans, equity, fixed income and insurance products, as well as in accounting, disclosure and reporting frameworks.' They worked with supporting organisations to develop tools and metrics to integrate natural capital factors into existing business structures.

In summary, its four key aims are to:

- Increase understanding of business dependency on natural capital assets;
- Support development of tools to integrate natural capital considerations into the decision-making process of all financial products and services;
- Help build a global consensus on integrating natural capital into private sector accounting and decision-making;
- Encourage a consensus on integrated reporting to include natural capital as one of the key components of an organisation's success.

== Natural Capital Protocol ==
In July 2016, the Natural Capital Coalition (now known as Capitals Coalition) released the Natural Capital Protocol. The Protocol provides a standardised framework for organisations to identify, measure and value their direct and indirect impacts and dependencies on natural capital. The Protocol harmonises existing tools and methodologies, and guides organisations towards the information they need to make strategic and operational decisions that include impacts and dependencies on natural capital.

The Protocol was developed in a unique collaboration between 38 organisations who signed voluntary, pre-competitive contracts. This collaboration was led by Mark Gough, who is now the CEO of the Capitals Coalition.

The Protocol is available on a creative commons license and is free for organisations to apply.

== Internationally agreed standard ==
Environmental-economic accounts provide the conceptual framework for integrated statistics on the environment and its relationship with the economy, including the impacts of the economy on the environment and the contribution of the environment to the economy. A coherent set of indicators and descriptive statistics can be derived from the accounts that inform a wide range of policies.

These include, but are not limited to:

- Green economy/green growth
- Natural resource management
- Sustainable development

The System of Integrated Environmental and Economic Accounting (SEEA) contains the internationally agreed standard concepts, definitions, classifications, accounting rules and tables for producing internationally comparable statistics on the environment and its relationship with the economy. The SEEA is a flexible system in the sense that its implementation can be adapted to countries' specific situations and priorities. Coordination of the implementation of the SEEA and ongoing work on new methodological developments is managed and supervised by the UN Committee of Experts on Environmental-Economic Accounting (UNCEEA). The final, official version of the SEEA Central Framework was published in February 2014.

In March 2021, the United Nations Statistical Commission adopted the SEEA Ecosystem Accounting (SEEA EA) standard at its 52nd session. The SEEA EA is a statistical framework that provides a coherent accounting approach to the measurement of ecosystems. Ecosystem accounts enable the presentation of data and indicators of ecosystem extent, ecosystem condition, and ecosystem services in both physical and monetary terms in a spatially explicit way. Following its adoption, the Statistics Division of the United Nations Department of Economic and Social Affairs (UN DESA) in collaboration with the United Nations Environment Programme (UNEP) and the Basque Centre for Climate Change (BC3) released the ARIES for SEEA Explorer in April 2021, an artificial intelligence-powered tool based on the Artificial Intelligence for Environment and Sustainability (ARIES) platform for rapid, standardized and customizable natural capital accounting. The ARIES for SEEA Explorer was made available on the UN Global Platform in order to accelerate SEEA's implementation worldwide.

== Private sector approaches ==
Some studies envisage a private sector natural capital 'ecosystem', including investors, assets and regulators. Classification of natural capital aids decisions makers and the ability of governments and businesses to monitor their natural capital assets. There are several proposed systems to classify natural capital into parts, such as land or timber, however many of them do not include all aspects of natural systems.

One approach has been the invention of Natural Asset Companies a form of investment in natural capital.

Several governments have implemented policies to incentivize the private sector to protect natural capital. The operations and practices of businesses have not dramatically altered.

== Criticism ==
Whilst measuring the components of natural capital in any region is a relatively straightforward process, both the task and the rationale of putting a monetary valuation on them, or on the value of the goods and services they freely give us, has proved more contentious. Within the UK, Guardian columnist, George Monbiot, has been critical of the work of the government's Natural Capital Committee and of other attempts to place any sort of monetary value on natural capital assets, or on the free ecosystem services they provide us with. In a speech referring to a report to government which suggested that better protection of the UK's freshwater ecosystems would yield an enhancement in aesthetic value of £700m, he derided attempts 'to compare things which cannot be directly compared'. He went on to say:

These figures, ladies and gentlemen, are marmalade. They are finely shredded, boiled to a pulp, heavily sweetened ... and still indigestible. In other words they are total gibberish.

— G. Monbiot

This idea is echoed by Brown University professor Jeff Todd Tinton, who argues that predictions of economic value are unlikely to be accurate because of how complicated the environment is. Furthermore, he argues that the current understanding of environmental capital does not adequately address the importance the environment has on culture. Cultural values are not able to be labeled with a dollar amount, so there will be aspects of nature and the environment that natural capital does not take into account.

Others have defended efforts to integrate the valuation of natural capital into local and national economic decision-making, arguing that it puts the environment on a more balanced footing when weighed against other commercial pressures, and that 'valuation' of those assets is not the same as monetisation.

Global biogeochemical cycles critical for life
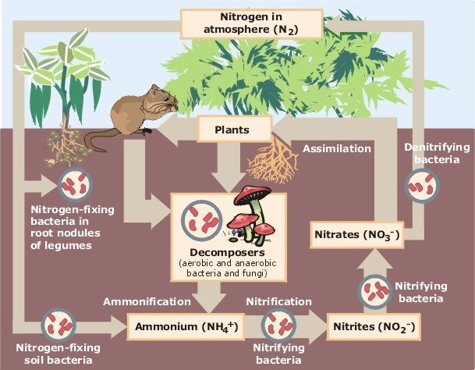
Nitrogen cycle

Water cycle

Carbon cycle

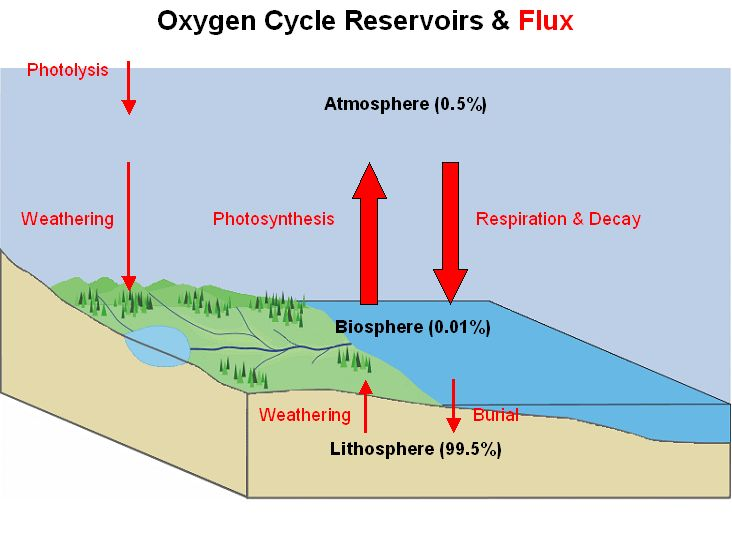
Oxygen cycle

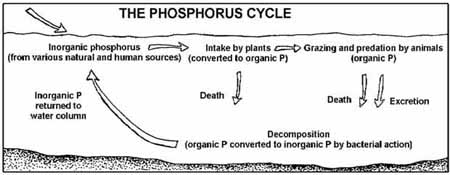
Phosphorus cycle

== See also ==
- Bioeconomics (biophysical)
- Biocapacity
- Conservation biology
- Earth Economics (organization)
- Ecodynamics
- Ecological deficit
- Ecological economics
- Ecological footprint
- Ecology
- Econophysics
- Ecosystem services
- Energy accounting
- Environmental degradation
- Environmental economics
- Environmental protection
- Habitat conservation
- Natural capital accounting
- Natural Capital Committee
- Natural Capital Initiative
- Oil depletion
- Payment for ecosystem services
- Population dynamics
- Renewable resource
- Sustainability
- Sustainable development
- The Economics of Ecosystems and Biodiversity
- Thermoeconomics
- True cost accounting
- Value of Earth
