= Victoria Transport Policy Institute =

Canadian transport policy think tank

The Victoria Transport Policy Institute is a Canadian think tank seeking to improve transportation planning and transportation policy.

The institute is an independent research organization dedicated to developing innovative and practical solutions to transportation problems. It is headed by Todd Litman, and it is located in Victoria, British Columbia.

The institute often comments on American transportation policies. It generally favours public transportation and alternatives to driving.
