= Bequest value =

Bequest value, in economics, is the value of satisfaction from preserving a natural environment or a historic environment, in other words natural heritage or cultural heritage for future generations.

It is often used when estimating the value of an environmental service or good. Together with the existence value, it makes up the non-use value of such an environmental service or good. In some optimization treatments, this value is also called the "salvage value" of the system.
