= Existence value =

Class of economic value

Existence values are a class of economic value, reflecting the benefit people receive from knowing that a particular environmental resource, such as Antarctica, the Grand Canyon, endangered species, or any other organism or thing exists.

Existence value is a prominent example of non-use value, as they do not require that utility be derived from direct use of the resource: the utility comes from simply knowing the resource exists. The idea was first introduced by John V. Krutilla in his essay "Conservation Reconsidered."

These values are commonly measured through contingent valuation surveys and have been actionable damages in the US since State of Ohio v. United States Department of the Interior, 880 F.2d 432 (U.S. App. D.C. 109 1989).. They were used in a legal assessment of damages following the Exxon Valdez oil spill.

== See also ==
- Ecosystem services
- Value of Earth
