= Earth Economics =

U.S. non-profit organization

- Founded: 2004
- Type: 501(3)(c)
- Purpose: Ecological Economics, Tools for Decision Makers
- Headquarters: Tacoma, Washington, USA
- Region served: Local, National, International
- Product: Workshops and training, ecosystem services valuation, benefit-cost analysis, industry analysis, finance and investment strategies
- Website: http://www.eartheconomics.org

Earth Economics is a 501(c)(3) non-profit formally established in 2004 and headquartered in Tacoma, Washington, United States. The organisation uses natural capital valuation to help decision makers and local stakeholders to understand the value of natural capital assets. By identifying, monetising, and valuing natural capital and ecosystem services.

Earth Economics primary focus is to help communities and organisations make investments and policy decisions. The organisation has a staff of economists and analysts, and long-standing collaborative partnerships with ecological economics founding leaders including Herman Daly, Robert Costanza and others.

== Approach ==
Earth Economics' current mission states, "We quantify and value the benefits nature provides. Our work drives effective decisions and systemic change through a combination of education, natural capital analysis, and policy recommendations."

Earth Economics was one of the earliest pioneering global consultancies applying ecological economics concepts and methods for management of urban and technosphere impact assessment, ecosystem services, natural capital and integrated multiple capitals, green infrastructure investment, net present value with zero discount rates for distributional social equity adjustments, as well as other methods for comprehensive sustainability accounting and biodiversity finance.

Earth Economics offers "a pragmatic, collaborative approach to help organisations make sound investment and policy decisions that mitigate risk, add value, and build resilience by taking nature into account." The organisation currently focuses on the global and regional priorities of working lands, freshwater, oceans, forests, and communities.

Earth Economics offers five types of services:

- Workshops & Trainings: Earth Economics offers hands-on workshops, trainings, and presentations that aim to raise awareness about ecological economics concepts and cost-effective solutions that build resilience, biodiversity, and equity.
- Ecosystem Services Valuation: Earth Economics is best known for their expertise in natural capital valuation. The Ecosystem Valuation Toolkit (EVT), an expanding and searchable database of ecosystem service values, serves as the foundation for these analyses.
- Benefit-Cost Analysis: Earth Economics’ benefit-cost analysis framework expands traditional cost-benefit equations to include ecosystem services and other factors including health, recreation, and effects on culture and community.
- Industry Analysis: Earth Economics works with businesses and economic development agencies to reduce risk, improve the efficiency of operations, reduce carbon footprint, and expand job opportunities.
- Finance & Investment Strategies: Earth Economics works with organizations to develop innovative approaches and practical financing strategies to preserve, enhance, or restore natural capital assets, including conservation lands, green infrastructure, working forests and farms, and green buildings.

== History ==
Earth Economics was established as a non-profit IRS 501(c)(3) tax exempt, public charity in March 2006. Prior to this program activities were managed as the Asia-Pacific Environmental Exchange (APEX), launched in 1997 as a project of The Tides Center.

Earth Economic's research and advocacy work since then has focused on the value that natural systems have in providing food, water, flood risk reduction, climate stabilisation, and other benefits. This work has been used to establish the value of watersheds and new funding mechanisms for maintaining natural capital.

Earth Economics has a track record of working alongside NGOs, businesses, and governmental organisations to inform investment and shift local and international policy in ways that account for the benefits of ecosystem services. Since 2013, Earth Economics has been working to incorporate ecosystem services in federal benefit-cost analysis and accounting practices.

== See also ==
- Ecological economics
- Ecosystem services
- Environmental economics
- Green accounting
- Natural capital
- Natural resource economics
- Sustainability
