= Population Balance =

US-American nonprofit organization for sustainability

Population Balance (formerly World Population Balance) is a 501(c)(3) non-profit organization in the United States that raises awareness of the connections between pronatalism, human overpopulation, human supremacy, social inequalities, and ecological overshoot, and advocates pathways that address their combined impacts on the planet, people, and animals.

== History and background ==
Population Balance was founded by David Paxson as World Population Balance in 1993. He was succeeded as the executive director in 2016 by Dave Gardner. In 2021 Nandita Bajaj became executive director and the organization adopted its current name of Population Balance and a new vision, mission, and philosophy.

Notable past and present advisors include Nobel Peace Prize laureate Norman Borlaug, former Governor of Michigan William Milliken, originator of the "ecological footprint" concept William E. Rees, actress and activist Alexandra Paul, and physicist Albert Allen Bartlett.

== Activities ==
Activities include two podcasts: OVERSHOOT | Shrink toward abundance and Beyond Pronatalism | Finding fulfillment, with or without kids, classroom and conference presentations, academic publications, and media and podcast interviews.

=== OVERSHOOT | Shrink Toward Abundance (Podcast) ===
OVERSHOOT is released twice monthly and is ranked in the top 1.5% of podcasts globally. The podcast hosts interview expert guests to explore the drivers and impacts of ecological overshoot as well as pathways forward. Notable guests have included William E. Rees, Alan Weisman, Mechai Viravaidya, Riane Eisler, Louie Psihoyos, Ingrid Newkirk, Carol Adams, Gladys Kalema-Zikusoka, Olivier De Schutter, Marc Bekoff, Paul Ehrlich, Naomi Oreskes, Angela Saini, Mathis Wackernagel, Partha Dasgupta, Carl Safina, Richard Heinberg, Orna Donath, Robert Jensen, Jo-Anne McArthur, Robert Engelman, Malcolm Potts, Alexandra Paul, Kevin Bales, Sally Armstrong, and Vegard Skirbekk.
