= Overexploitation =

Depleting a renewable resource

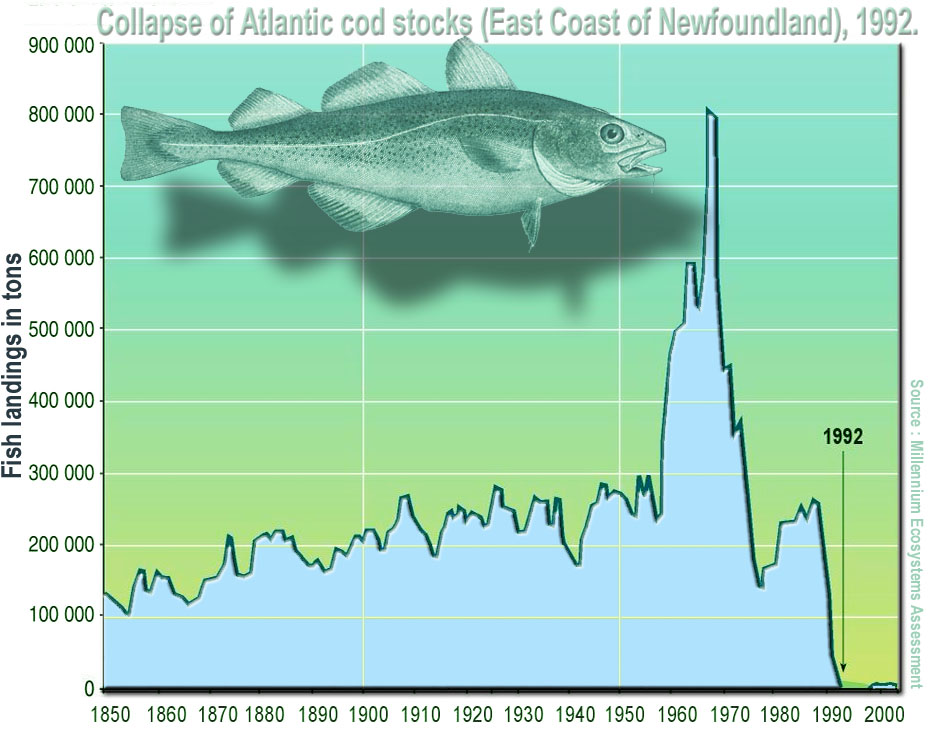
Atlantic cod stocks were severely overexploited in the 1970s and 1980s, leading to their abrupt collapse in 1992.

Overexploitation, also called overharvesting or ecological overshoot, refers to harvesting a renewable resource to the point of diminishing returns. Continued overexploitation can lead to the destruction of the resource, as it will be unable to replenish itself. The term applies to various natural resources, such as water aquifers, grazing pastures and forests, wild medicinal plants, fish stocks, and other wildlife.

In ecology, "overexploitation" describes one of the five main activities threatening global biodiversity. Ecologists use the term to describe populations that are harvested at an unsustainable rate, given their natural rates of mortality and capacities for reproduction. Such practices can result in extinction at the population level and even extinction of whole species. In conservation biology, the term is usually used in the context of human economic activity that involves the taking of biological resources, or organisms, in larger numbers than their populations can withstand. The term is also used and defined somewhat differently in fisheries, hydrology, and natural resource management.

Overexploitation can lead to resource destruction, including extinctions; however, it can also be sustainable, as discussed below in the section on fisheries. In the context of fishing, the term "overfishing" can be used instead of "overexploitation," as can "overgrazing" in stock management, "overlogging" in forest management, "overdrafting" in aquifer management, and "endangered species" in species monitoring. Overexploitation is not an activity limited to humans. Introduced predators and herbivores, for example, can overexploit native flora and fauna.

== History ==
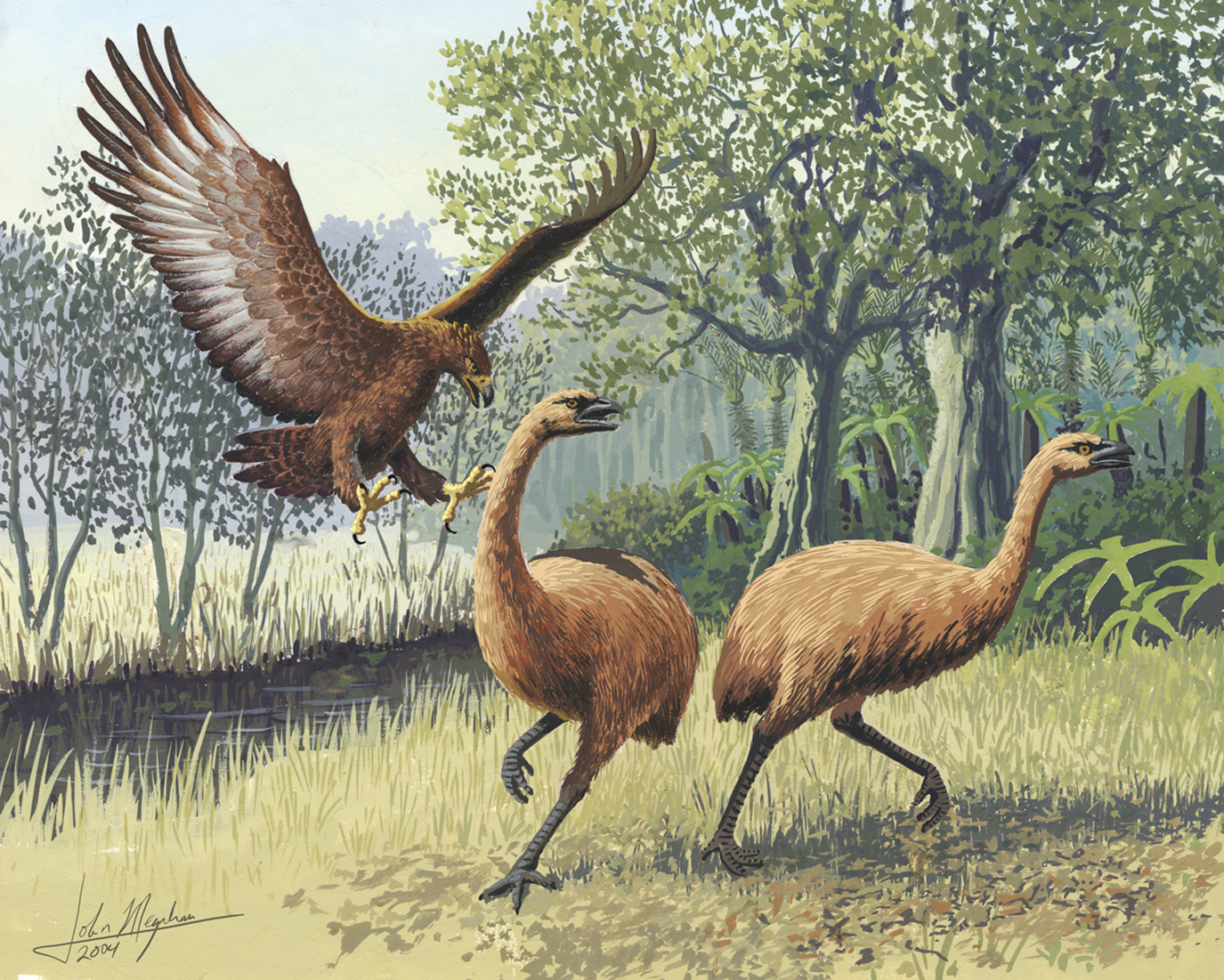
When the giant flightless birds called moa were overexploited to the point of extinction, the giant Haast's eagle that preyed on them also became extinct.

Even though people are only starting to care about the environment in modern times, worries about overexploitation have been around for a long time. Overexploitation has been recorded for millennia and is not confined to humans, contrary to popular belief. History demonstrates that numerous societies have excessively exploited natural resources, occasionally resulting in severe repercussions such as species extinction and ecosystem degradation. There is paleontological evidence that prehistoric communities led to the extinction of certain species. The possibility that human influence has drastically affected various animal species is not a new idea; already in 1916 Edward Winslow Gifford proposed that overexploitation was the most logical explanation for the stratigraphic variation of remains of marine invertebrates present in San Francisco Bay.

One poignant example can be found in the ceremonial cloaks of Hawaiian kings, which were adorned with the feathers of the now-extinct mamo bird. Crafting a single cloak required the feathers of approximately 70,000 adult mamo birds, illustrating a staggering scale of resource extraction that ultimately contributed to the extinction of these birds. This instance highlights how cultural traditions and their associated demands can sometimes lead to the overexploitation of a species to the brink of extinction.

The story of the dodo bird from Mauritius is another clear example of overexploitation. The dodo, a flightless bird, exhibited a lack of fear toward predators, including humans, making it exceptionally vulnerable to hunting. The dodo quickly became extinct because it was naive and lacked natural defenses against both human hunters and newly introduced species. This case offers insight into how certain species, particularly those isolated on islands, can be disproportionately affected by human activities due to their evolutionary adaptations.

Hunting has been an important part of survival for a long time, giving people food, clothes, and tools. However, the history of hunting also includes episodes of overexploitation, particularly in the form of overhunting, which has led to significant declines in certain animal populations and disrupted ecosystems, such as the extinction of species like the woolly mammoth and the saber-toothed cat. The overkill hypothesis, which addresses the Quaternary extinction events, explains the relatively rapid extinction of megafauna after human arrival. This hypothesis posits that these extinctions were intricately associated with human migration and subsequent population growth. One strong piece of evidence for this theory is that about 80% of North America's large mammal species became extinct within about a thousand years of humans arriving in the Western Hemisphere. This rapid disappearance indicates the significant impact of human activity on these species, which emphasizes the profound effect humans have had on their environment throughout history. A 2018 study says that large mammals started to become extinct in Africa at least 125,000 years ago because of human hunting. This extinction occurred 90,000 years earlier than previously estimated. As humans migrated, size-biased extinctions occurred in regions that aligned with human migration patterns, resulting in a significant global decrease in average mammal body size.

A study of the East African carnivore fossil record over the last four million years published in the March 2020 issue of Ecology Letters found that extinction rates in large carnivores correlate with increased hominin brain size and vegetation changes, but not with precipitation or temperature changes. While temporal analyses cannot distinguish between the effects of vegetation changes and hominins, spatial analyses of contemporary carnivores in Africa suggest that only hominin causation is plausible. This suggests that substantial anthropogenic influence on biodiversity started millions of years earlier than currently assumed.

The fastest-ever recorded extinction of megafauna occurred in New Zealand. By 1500 AD, a mere 200 years after the first human settlements, ten species of the giant moa birds were driven to extinction by the Māori. This swift extinction underscores the significant impact humans can have on native wildlife, particularly in remote ecosystems like New Zealand. The Māori, relying on the moa as a primary food source and for resources such as feathers and bones, hunted these birds extensively. The moa's inability to fly and their size, which made them easier targets, contributed to their extinction. This event serves as a cautionary tale about the delicate balance between human activity and biodiversity, highlighting the potential consequences of overhunting and habitat destruction. A second wave of extinctions occurred later as a result of European settlement. This period marked significant ecological disruption, primarily due to the introduction of new species and changes in land use. European settlers introduced animals such as rats, cats, and stoats, which preyed upon native birds and other wildlife. Additionally, deforestation for agricultural purposes has significantly altered the habitats of many endemic species. These combined factors accelerated the decline of New Zealand's unique biodiversity, resulting in the extinction of several additional species.

In more recent times, overexploitation has led to the gradual emergence of the concepts of sustainability and sustainable development, which have built upon other concepts, such as sustainable yield, eco-development, and deep ecology.

== Overview ==
Overexploitation may not destroy the resource, and it can be sustainable. However, reducing either the population or the quantity of a resource can negatively affect its quality. For example, the footstool palm is a wild palm tree found in Southeast Asia. Its leaves are used for thatching and food wrapping, and overharvesting has resulted in its leaf size becoming smaller.

=== Tragedy of the commons ===
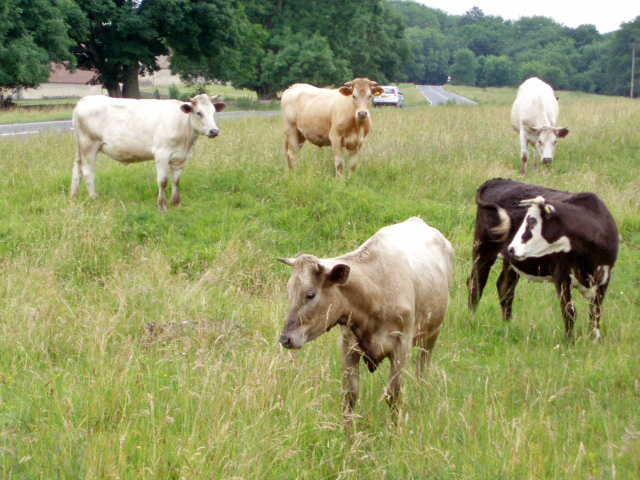
Cows on Selsley Common. The tragedy of the commons is a useful parable for understanding how overexploitation can occur.

In 1968, the journal Science published an essay by Garrett Hardin. It was based on a parable that William Forster Lloyd published in 1833 to explain how individuals innocently acting in their own self-interest can overexploit and destroy a resource that they all share. Lloyd described a simplified hypothetical situation based on medieval land tenure systems in Europe, where herders share common land on which they are each entitled to graze their cows. In Hardin's article, it is in each herder's individual interest to graze each new cow that the herder acquires on the common land, even if the carrying capacity of the common is exceeded, which damages the common for all the herders. The self-interested herder receives all of the benefits of having the additional cow, while all the herders share the damage to the commons. However, all herders reach the same rational decision to buy additional cows and graze them on the common, which eventually destroys it. Hardin concluded:

Therein is the tragedy. Each man is locked into a system that compels him to increase his herd without limit—in a world that is limited. Ruin is the destination toward which all men rush, each pursuing his own interest in a society that believes in the freedom of the commons. Freedom in a commons brings ruin to all.

Hardin developed the theme, drawing in many examples of latter-day commons, such as national parks, the atmosphere, oceans, rivers, and fish stocks. The example of fish stocks had led some to call the phenomenon the "tragedy of the fishers." A major theme running through the essay is the growth of human populations, along with the idea that Earth's finite resources are commonly shared.

The tragedy of the commons has intellectual roots tracing back to Aristotle, who noted that "what is common to the greatest number has the least care bestowed upon it," as well as to Hobbes and his Leviathan.

Proper regulation can prevent the tragedy of the commons. Hardin's use of "commons" has frequently been misunderstood, leading Hardin to later remark that he should have titled his work "The tragedy of the unregulated commons."

== Sectors ==
=== Fisheries ===
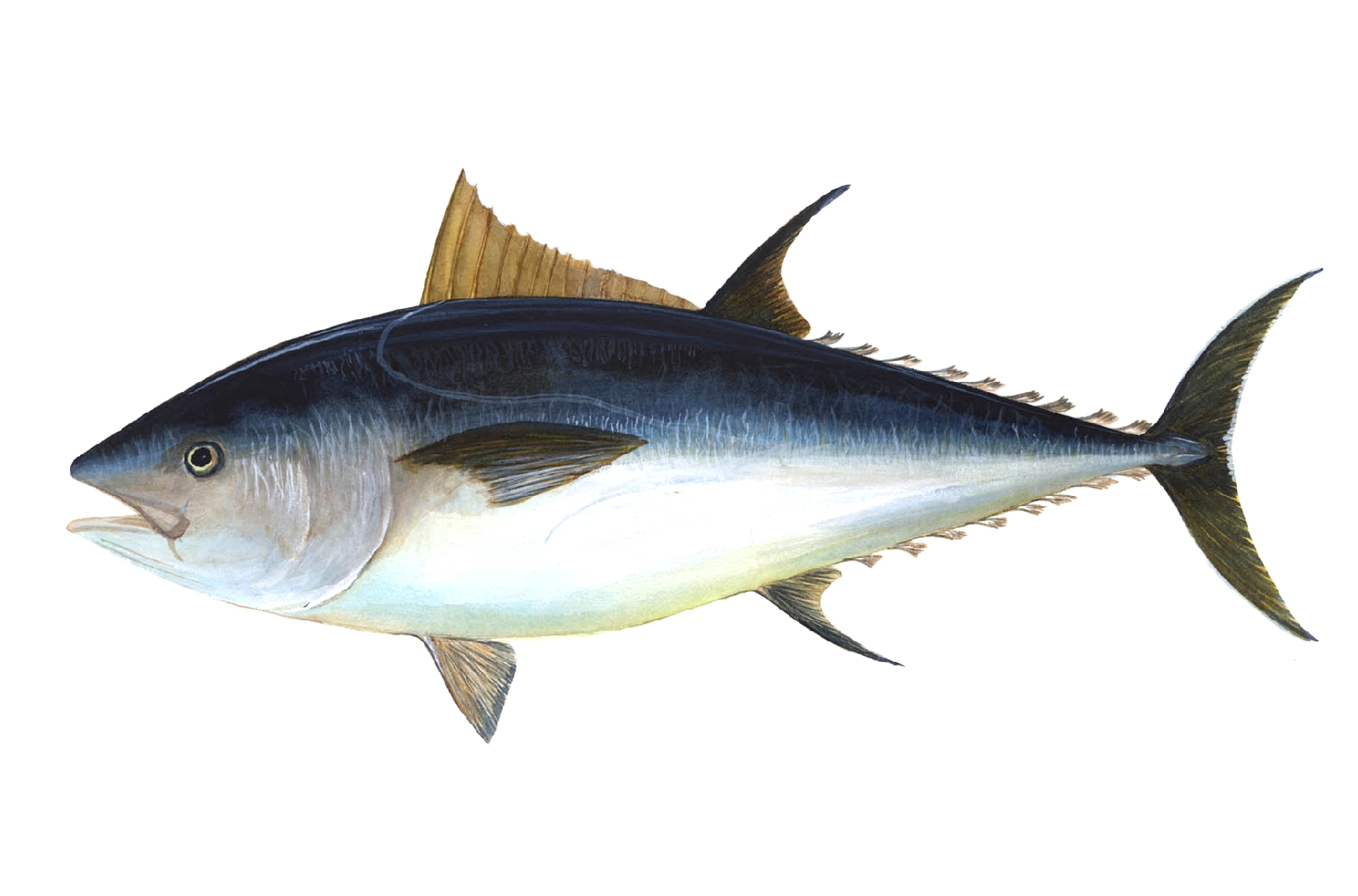
The Atlantic bluefin tuna is currently overexploited. Scientists say 7,500 tons annually is the sustainable limit, yet the fishing industry continue to harvest 60,000 tons.

In wild fisheries, overfishing occurs when a fish stock has been fished down "below the size that, on average, would support the long-term maximum sustainable yield of the fishery."

When a fishery starts harvesting fish from a previously unexploited stock, the biomass of the fish stock will decrease, since harvesting means fish are being removed. For sustainability, the rate at which the fish replenish biomass through reproduction must balance the rate at which the fish are being harvested. Increasing the harvest rate will lead to a further decrease in the stock biomass. At a certain point, the maximum harvest yield that can be sustained will be reached, and further attempts to increase the harvest rate will result in the collapse of the fishery. This point is called the maximum sustainable yield and, in practice, usually occurs when the fishery has been fished down to about 30% of the biomass it had before harvesting started.

Fish stocks are said to "collapse" if their biomass declines by more than 95 percent of the maximum historical biomass recorded. Atlantic cod stocks were severely overexploited in the 1970s and 1980s, leading to their abrupt collapse in 1992. Even though fishing has ceased, the cod stocks have failed to recover. The absence of cod as the apex predator in many areas has led to trophic cascades.

About 25% of world fisheries are now overexploited to the point where their current biomass is less than the level that maximizes their sustainable yield. Reducing fishing pressure often allows these depleted fisheries to recover until the stock biomass reaches the optimal level. At this point, harvesting can be resumed near the maximum sustainable yield.

The tragedy of the commons can be avoided within the context of fisheries if fishing effort and practices are regulated appropriately by fisheries management. One effective approach may involve assigning individual transferable quotas (ITQs) as a form of ownership to fishermen. In 2008, a large-scale study of fisheries that used ITQs and ones that did not provided strong evidence that ITQs help prevent collapses and restore fisheries that appear to be in decline.

=== Water resources ===
Water resources, such as lakes and aquifers, are usually renewable resources that naturally recharge (the term "fossil water" is sometimes used to describe aquifers that do not recharge). Overexploitation occurs if a water resource, such as the Ogallala Aquifer, is mined or extracted at a rate that exceeds the recharge rate, that is, at a rate that exceeds the practical sustained yield. Recharge usually comes from local streams, rivers, and lakes. An aquifer that has been overexploited is said to be overdrafted or depleted. Forests enhance the recharge of aquifers in some locales, although generally forests are a major source of aquifer depletion. Depleted aquifers can become polluted with contaminants like nitrates, or they can be permanently damaged by subsidence or saline intrusion from the ocean.

This turns much of the world's underground water and lakes into finite resources with peak-usage debates similar to oil. These debates usually focus on agriculture and suburban water usage, but the generation of electricity from nuclear energy or coal and tar sands mining is also water-resource intensive. A modified Hubbert curve applies to any resource that can be harvested faster than it can be replaced. Though Hubbert's original analysis did not apply to renewable resources, their overexploitation can result in a Hubbert-like peak. This conclusion has led to the concept of peak water.

=== Forestry ===
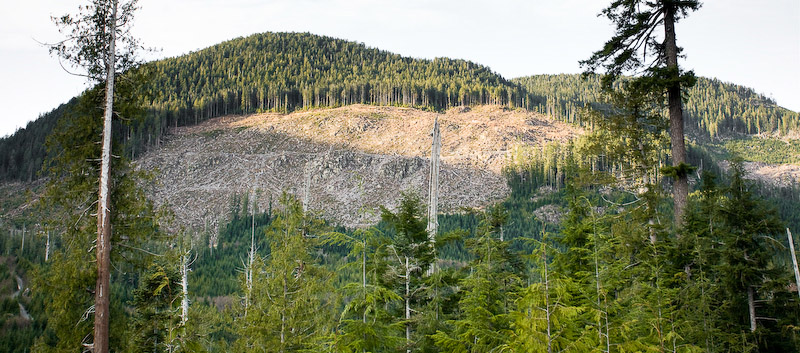
Clear cutting of old growth forests in Canada.

Forests are considered overexploited when logging occurs at a rate that exceeds the rate of reforestation. Reforestation competes with other land uses such as food production, livestock grazing, and living space for further economic growth. Historically, the utilization of forest products, including timber and fuel wood, has played a key role in human societies, comparable to the roles of water and cultivable land. Today, developed countries continue to utilize timber for building houses and wood pulp for paper. In developing countries, about three billion people rely on wood for heating and cooking. Short-term economic gains from converting forests to agriculture or overexploiting wood products typically result in a loss of long-term income and biological productivity. Madagascar, Southeast Asia, and many other regions have experienced lower revenue because of overexploitation and the consequent declining timber harvests.

== Biodiversity ==
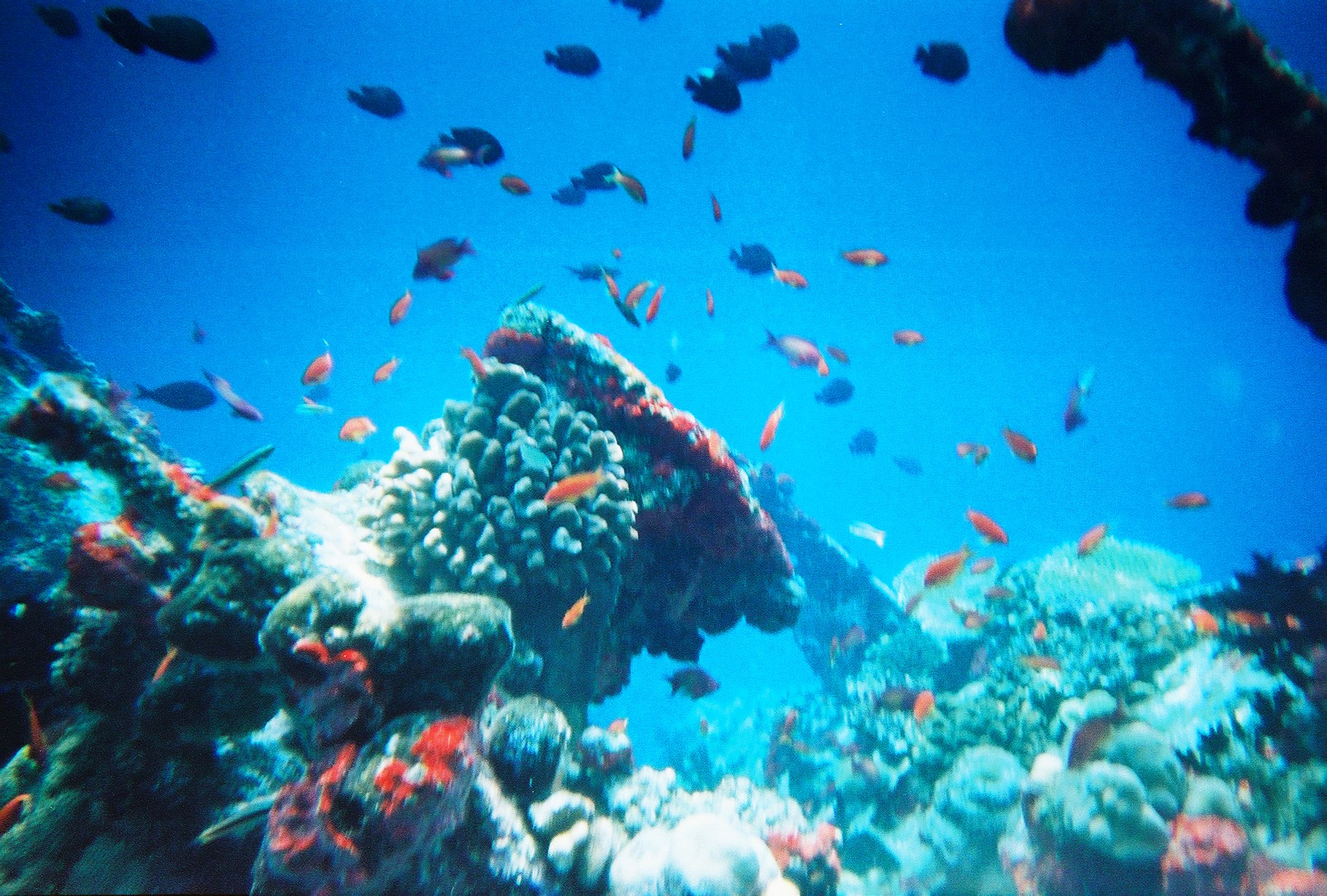
The rich diversity of marine life inhabiting coral reefs attracts bioprospectors. Many coral reefs are overexploited; threats include coral mining, cyanide and blast fishing, and overfishing in general.

Overexploitation is one of the main threats to global biodiversity. Other threats include pollution, introduced and invasive species, habitat fragmentation, habitat destruction, uncontrolled hybridization, climate change, ocean acidification, and the driver behind many of these, human overpopulation.

One of the key health issues associated with biodiversity is drug discovery and the availability of medicinal resources. A significant proportion of drugs are derived from natural products that come directly or indirectly from biological sources. Marine ecosystems are of particular interest in this regard. However, unregulated and inappropriate bioprospecting could potentially lead to overexploitation, ecosystem degradation, and loss of biodiversity.

== Endangered and extinct species ==
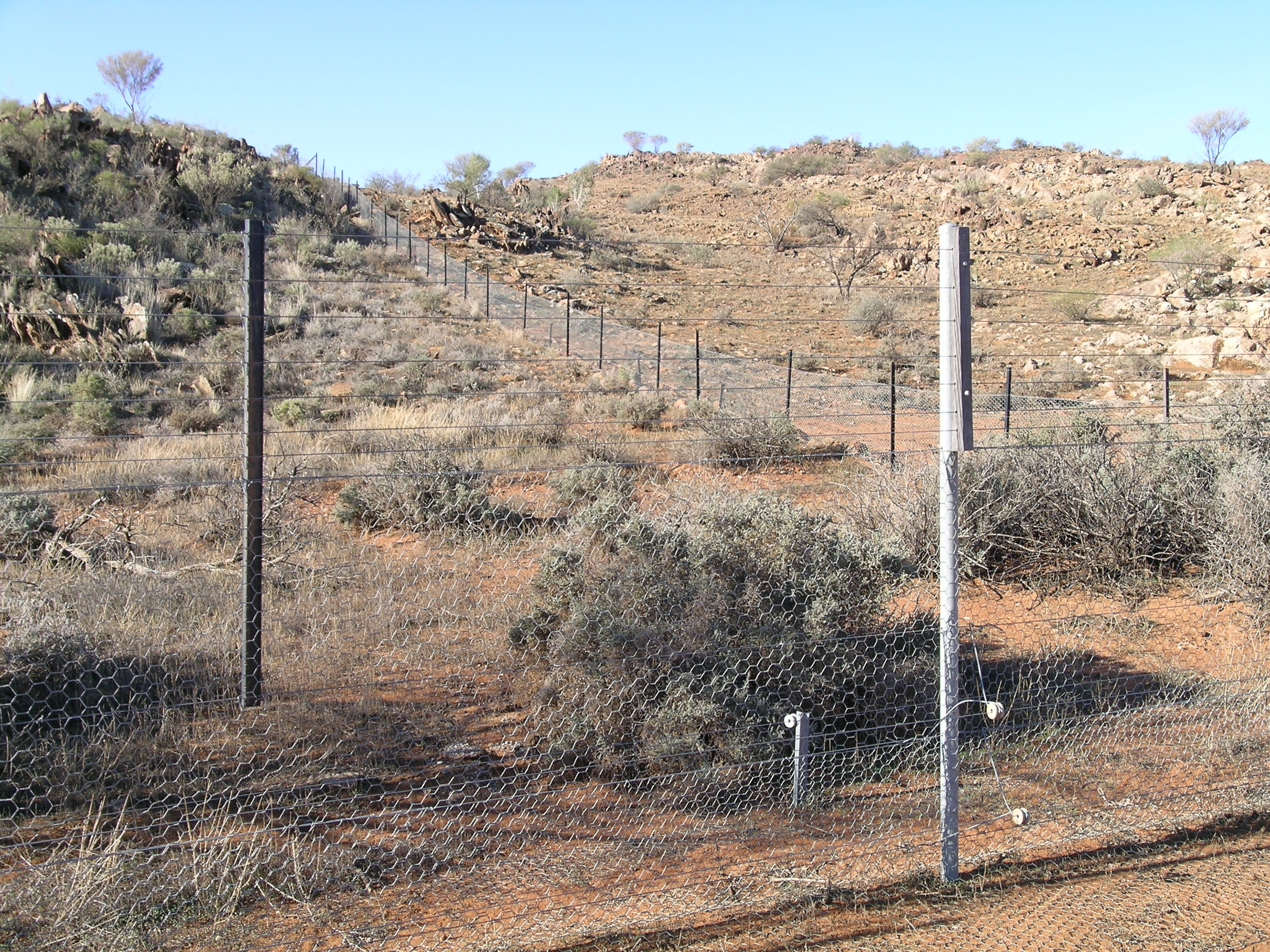
It is not just humans that overexploit resources. Overgrazing can be caused by native fauna, as shown in the upper right. However, past human overexploitation (leading to elimination of some predators) may be behind the situation.

Overexploitation affects species from all groups of fauna and flora. This phenomenon is not bound by taxonomy; it spans across mammals, birds, fish, insects, and plants alike. Animals are hunted for their fur, tusks, or meat, while plants are harvested for medicinal purposes, timber, or ornamental uses. This unsustainable practice disrupts ecosystems, threatening biodiversity and leading to the potential extinction of vulnerable species.

All living organisms require resources to survive. Overexploitation of these resources for protracted periods can deplete natural stocks to the point where they are unable to recover within a short time frame. Humans have always harvested food and other resources they need to survive. Historically, human populations were small, and collection methods limited them to small quantities. With an exponential increase in human population, expanding markets, and increasing demand, combined with improved access and techniques for capture, the exploitation of many species is beyond sustainable levels. In practical terms, if continued, it reduces valuable resources to such low levels that their exploitation is no longer sustainable and can lead to the extinction of a species, in addition to having dramatic, unforeseen effects on the ecosystem. Overexploitation often occurs rapidly as markets open, using previously untapped resources or locally used species.

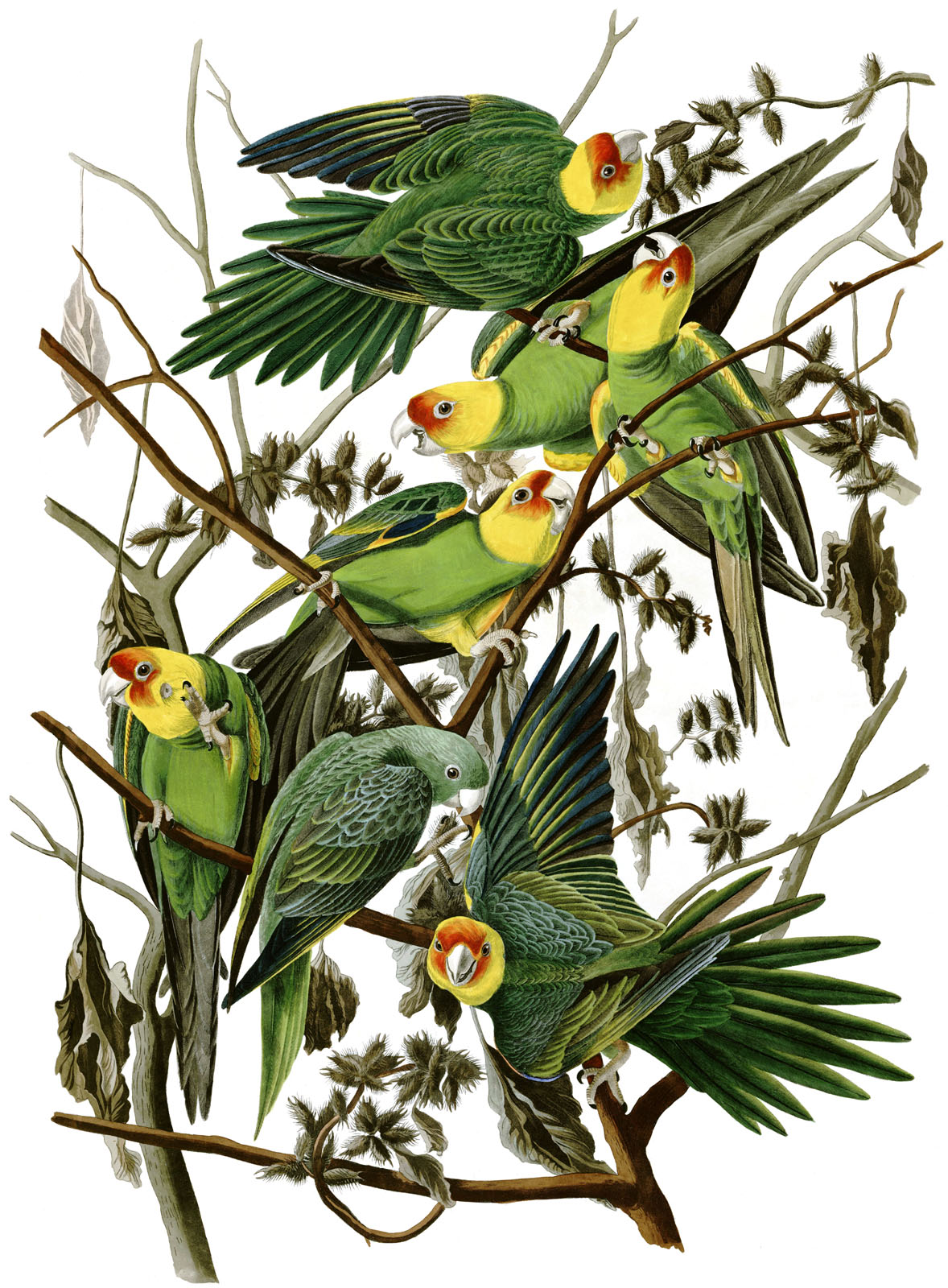
The Carolina parakeet was hunted to extinction.

Overexploitation and misuse of natural resources are an ever-present threat to species richness. This phenomenon is more common in island ecology, where islands are like miniature worlds. Island endemic populations are more prone to extinction from overexploitation, as they often exist at low densities with reduced reproductive rates. Favorable examples of such populations are island snails, such as the Hawaiian Achatinella and the French Polynesian Partula. Achatinelline snails have 15 species listed as extinct and 24 as critically endangered, while 60 species of Partulidae are considered extinct, with 14 listed as critically endangered. The WCMC has attributed over-collecting and very low lifetime fecundity to the extreme vulnerability exhibited among these species.

As another example, when the humble hedgehog was introduced to the Scottish island of Uist, the population greatly expanded and took to consuming and overexploiting shorebird eggs, with drastic consequences for their breeding success. Twelve species of avifauna are affected, with some species numbers being reduced by 39%.

Where there is substantial human migration, civil unrest, or war, controls may no longer exist. With civil unrest, for example, in the Congo and Rwanda, firearms have become common, and the breakdown of food distribution networks in such countries leaves the resources of the natural environment vulnerable. Animals are even killed as target practice or simply to spite the government. Populations of large primates, such as gorillas and chimpanzees, ungulates, and other mammals, may be reduced by 80% or more by hunting, and certain species may be eliminated. This decline has been called the bushmeat crisis.

=== Vertebrates ===
Overexploitation threatens one-third of endangered vertebrates, as well as other groups. Excluding edible fish, the illegal trade in wildlife is valued at $10 billion per year. Industries responsible for such activities include the trade in bushmeat, the trade in Chinese medicine, and the fur trade. The Convention for International Trade in Endangered Species of Wild Fauna and Flora, or CITES, was set up to control and regulate the trade in endangered animals. It currently protects, to a varying degree, some 33,000 species of animals and plants. It is estimated that a quarter of the endangered vertebrates in the United States of America and half of the endangered mammals are attributed to overexploitation.

==== Birds ====
Overexploitation has affected 50 bird species that have become extinct since 1500 (approximately 40% of the total), including:

- The great auk, the penguin-like bird of the north, was hunted for its feathers, meat, fat, and oil.
- Carolina parakeet—The only parrot species native to the eastern United States, it was hunted for crop protection and its feathers.

==== Mammals ====
- The international trade in fur: chinchilla, vicuña, giant otter and numerous cat species

==== Fish ====
- Aquarium hobbyists: tropical fish

==== Various ====
- Novelty pets: snakes, parrots, primates and big cats
- Chinese medicine: bears, tigers, rhinos, seahorses, Asian black bear and saiga antelope

=== Invertebrates ===
- Insect collectors: butterflies
- Shell collectors: Marine molluscs

=== Plants ===
- Horticulturists: New Zealand mistletoe (Trilepidea adamsii), orchids, cacti and many other plant species

== Cascade effects ==
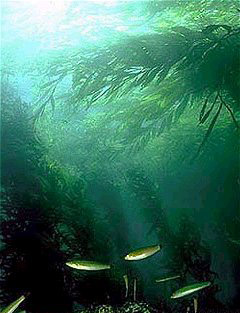
Overexploiting sea otters resulted in cascade effects that destroyed kelp forest ecosystems.

Overexploitation of species can result in knock-on or cascade effects. Such effects can particularly apply if, through overexploitation, a habitat loses its apex predator. The loss of the top predator can lead to a dramatic increase in the population of its prey species. In turn, the unchecked prey can then overexploit their food resources until population numbers dwindle, possibly to the point of extinction.

A classic example of cascade effects is the case of sea otters. Starting before the 17th century and not phased out until 1911, sea otters were hunted aggressively for their exceptionally warm and valuable pelts, which could fetch up to $2500 US. This caused cascade effects through the kelp forest ecosystems along the Pacific Coast of North America.

One of the sea otters' primary food sources is the sea urchin. When hunters caused the sea otter populations to decline, their decline led to an ecological release of the sea urchin populations. The sea urchins then overexploited their main food source, kelp, creating urchin barrens, areas of seabed denuded of kelp but carpeted with urchins. Consequently, the sea urchin population also became locally extinct due to the lack of food. Also, since kelp forest ecosystems are homes to many other species, the loss of the kelp caused other cascade effects of secondary extinctions.

In 1911, when only one small group of 32 sea otters survived in a remote cove, an international treaty was signed to prevent further exploitation of the sea otters. Under heavy protection, the otters multiplied and repopulated the depleted areas, which slowly recovered. More recently, with declining numbers of fish stocks, again due to overexploitation, killer whales have experienced a food shortage and have been observed feeding on sea otters, again reducing their numbers.

== See also ==
- Carrying capacity
- Common-pool resource
- Conservation biology
- Defaunation
- Deforestation
- Ecological footprint
- Ecological overshoot
- Ecosystem management
- Earth Overshoot Day
- Exploitation of natural resources
- Extinction
- Human overpopulation
- Inverse commons
- Jevons paradox
- Lotka–Volterra equations
- Maximum power principle
- Over-consumption
- Overpopulation in wild animals
- Paradox of enrichment
- Planetary boundaries
- Social dilemma
- Sustainability
- Tyranny of small decisions
