= Glacier Loss Day =

Indicator for glacial loss

Glacier Loss Day (GLD) marks the time of year when a glacier has lost all the ice and snow it gained the previous winter. GLD can serve as an indicator for glacier's state of "illness".

== Definition ==
The concept of the Glacier Loss Day was introduced 2022 by researchers Annelies Voordendag, Rainer Prinz, Lilian Schuster and Georg Kaser of the University of Innsbruck. They refer to GLD "as being the day in the hydrological year on which the mass accumulated during winter is lost, and the glacier loses mass irrecoverably for the rest of the mass balance year."

== Purpose ==
The Glacier Loss Day aims to raise awareness of the rapid loss of glaciers due to climate change. The concept is inspired by Earth Overshoot Day, the day when humanity's demand for renewable resources exceeds the Earth's supply and capacity to reproduce those resources that year.

== Method ==
The basis for determining the Glacier Loss Day is the continuous monitoring of a glacier, which has been technically possible for some years.

Austrian scientists use laser scanners to take daily measurements of a glacier's volume in the back of the Ötztal valley (Hintereisferner). In this way, it has been possible to precisely determine GLD for this glacier from 2020 on.

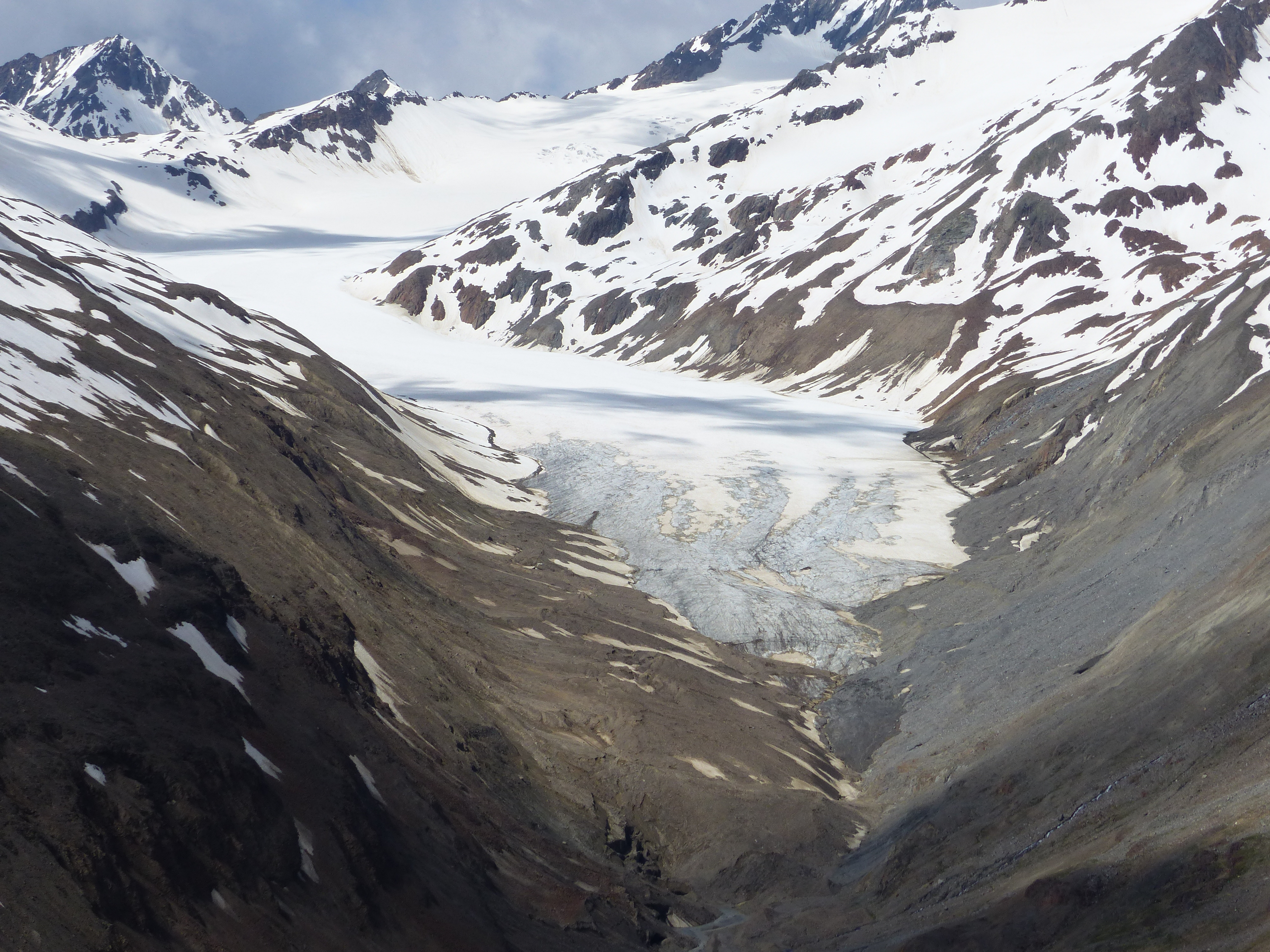
Hintereisferner in the Ötztal valley in Austria, Europe.

Hintereisferner
Year	Glacier Loss Day
2022	23 June
2021	11 August
2020	11 August

An early Glacier Loss Day means that the potential for further mass loss of a glacier is much higher. At Hintereisferner the low winter accumulation and the early start of the ablation season defined the early GLD and gave way to a long and extensive ice ablation period. Mass loss was therefore 5 times higher than in the 2 preceding years.

== Scope ==
So far, Hintereisferner is the only glacier for which GLD has been identified for several consecutive years. However, scientist are confident that with ongoing developments in modelling approaches and improvements in glaciological and geodetic measurements GLD can be studied for other glaciers soon.

The GLD can be calculated not only for individual glaciers but also for a whole region, e.g. the Swiss Alps.

All Swiss glaciers
Year	Glacier Loss Day
2022	26 June
2026	29 June

A global GLD is not meaningful because of the different ablation periods in the northern and southern hemispheres.
