= ISEE Kenneth Boulding Award for Ecological Economics =

International prize awarded to eminent researchers in ecological economics

'The International Society for Ecological Economics Kenneth E. Boulding Memorial Award for Ecological Economics' has been awarded since 1994. It is named after Kenneth E. Boulding to scholars who shared Boulding's sensibility for moral philosophy and natural sciences. This is not to be confused with the Boulding Award established since 1990 by the Association for Interdisciplinary Studies.

== ISEE Boulding Award Recipients ==
Winners
Year	Laureate	Laureate
1994	Robert Goodland	Herman Daly
1996	Ann-Mari Jansson	-
1998	Robert Costanza	-
2000	C.S. Holling	-
2002	Robert Ayres	-
2004	Karl Goran-Maler	Partha Dasgupta
2006	Richard Norgaard	-
2008	Manfred Max Neef	Charles Perrings
2010	Joan Martinez Alier	Ignacy Sachs
2012	William Rees	Mathis Wackernagel
2014	Peter Victor	-
2016	Kanchan Chopra	Arild Vatn
2018	Inge Røpke	-
2020	Rashid Hassan	-
2023	Bina Agarwal	David Barkin
2025	Jerome R. Ravetz	Silvio Funtowicz

== See also ==
- Ecological Economics (journal)
