= William E. Rees =

Canadian ecologist (born 1943)

William Rees
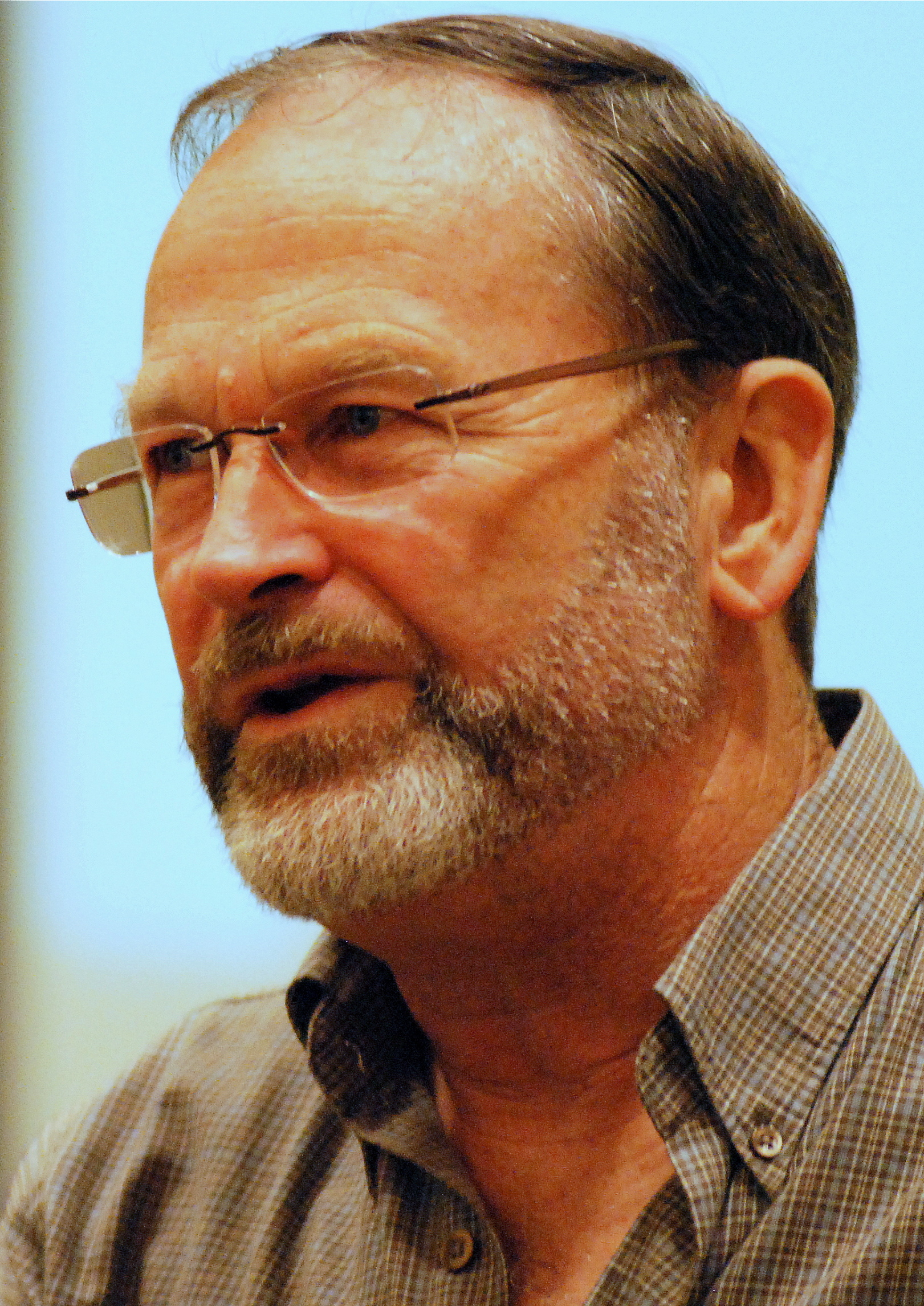
- William Rees, in 2008
- Born: December 18, 1943 (age 82); Brandon, Manitoba, Canada
- Education: University of Toronto (Ph.D)
- Occupation: Professor
- Known for: Creating the ecological footprint concept
- Title: Professor

William E. (Bill) Rees, PhD, FRSC, is a Canadian human ecologist,^{[1]} ecological economist^{[2]} and Professor Emeritus at the University of British Columbia in Vancouver, Canada, where he taught and conducted interdisciplinary research for more than four decades. He is perhaps best known for co-developing the ecological footprint concept and method of analysis with his graduate students. This quantitative tool estimates humanity's demand on nature, through measurable flows of energy and materials to and from ecosystems; it thus reinforces associated concepts such as ecological limits and biocapacity, and shows clearly that the human enterprise is in a state of advanced ecological overshoot.

Rees' work has long focused on the relationship between the human enterprise and the ecosphere, sustainability, human carrying capacity, over-exploitation, ecological overshoot, and urban systems and on cognitive barriers to understanding the depth of our eco-predicament. He has authored or co-authored hundreds of peer-reviewed papers and popular articles on these issues. His work is taken up by governments, nongovernmental organizations, educators, and scholars internationally. Rees has been a member of various sustainability-oriented organizations, including the Canadian Society for Ecological Economics (co-founder and past-president), OneEarth Living (co-founder), the Post Carbon Institute, and the Club of Rome.

Rees' contributions are widely recognized. He was elected a Fellow of the Royal Society of Canada and received a Pierre Elliott Trudeau Foundation Fellowship. Honours include the Blue Planet Prize (shared with his former student Mathis Wackernagel), the ISEE Kenneth Boulding Award for Ecological Economics, the Herman Daly Award, and an honorary doctorate from Université Laval.

He also held senior administrative roles at UBC, including Director of the School of Community and Regional Planning (SCARP).

== Background ==
Background / Youth

William E. (Bill) Rees was born on December 18, 1943, in Brandon, Manitoba, Canada, and spent his early childhood in Montreal, Quebec, and later in Toronto, Ontario. Many of his most formative experiences took place on his grandparents' farm in southern Ontario, where he began to experience and understand humans as a species within many ecosystems. With various cousins, Rees worked the market garden, picked apples, fed and "dusted" the chickens, pitch-forked hay onto a horse-drawn wagon, and went fishing when the day's work was done.

On one occasion after the day's exertions, a ten-year old 'Billy' was sitting at his Grandmother's dinner table, staring absently at the food heaped on his plate. "My subconscious must have been grinding away because it suddenly struck me that I had had a hand in raising everything I was about to eat. Trivial observation? Perhaps, but with it came an unexpected rush of emotion including a profound insight. I knew deep in my bones that farm work and food made me a product of sun and soil. I acquired a very personal understanding that we are, quite literally, what we eat. No science there. This was the experience of raw truth, my personal epiphany."

Since then, Rees has been concerned that few young people today have an opportunity to be "up close and personal" with the ecosystems that support them – and thus have never come to feel "in their bones" that they are part of nature.

Undergraduate studies

Rees first earned an undergraduate degree (B.Sc.) in Zoology from the University of Toronto. This foundational study of animal biology and ecosystems provided the groundwork for his later explorations of human ecology, carrying capacity and biophysical limits.

Ph.D in Population Ecology (University of Toronto)

Continuing his education with a scholarship to the University of Toronto, Rees earned his Ph.D. in population ecology. His fieldwork and academic courses equipped him with the conceptual and analytical tools to study population dynamics in relation to biocapacity, inter- and intra-specific competition, the interplay of positive and negative feedback, and how these factors ultimately impose limits on population and material growth. It also infused him with a lasting fascination with society's general ignorance of the biophysical foundations of its own existence. Thus equipped, Rees joined the University of British Columbia (UBC) in September 1969, initially with a joint appointment as assistant professor in the School of Community and Regional Planning (SCARP) and the (former) Institute of Animal Resource Ecology.

Early academic Experience

Rees was assigned the task of developing an "ecological planning" stream in SCARP, beginning with courses on the ecological basis for planning and on ecological land-use planning. His early research focused on the application of environmental impact assessment in Canada, but his background in ecology helped him maintain his broad interest in the biophysical requirements for human sustainability.

Shortly after joining UBC, Dr. Rees was appointed to an interdisciplinary committee tasked with establishing the parameters for a proposed new water-oriented research centre. He was asked to explain his research interests and potential contribution to the new centre. Rees presented a seminar to the committee on human carrying capacity and the relevance of the concept to water resource management. A senior colleague (one of Canada's foremost resource economists) later took him aside and warned him that, should he pursue this line of research, his career at UBC would be a Hobbesian "nasty, brutish and short." Apparently, economists had negated the concept of carrying capacity as applied to Homo sapiens.

This was Rees' introduction to the assumptions of neoliberal economics that the human enterprise operates separately from, and largely independent of, nature. His economist colleague told him that "human ingenuity (read 'technology') is the greatest resource" and that any residual local resource limits could be overcome through trade, at least until technology came to the rescue.

Despite this initial discouragement, Rees continued to dwell on the humanity-nature connection, convinced that the material assumptions of neoliberal economic theory were deeply flawed. This instinct was buoyed by the early ecology-oriented publications of renegade economist Herman Daly, one of the fathers of ecological economics (and who subsequently became a collaborator and friend). Rees was encouraged enough to develop a special focus on the material ecology of modern cities. He came to view them as massive "dissipative structures" that can be sustained only by the continuous consumption/dissipation of low-entropy energy and matter and the production of entropic waste. This urban metabolism makes cities essentially parasitic on the ecosphere; at best, they are the eco-dependent consumptive components of the total human ecosystem and thus highly vulnerable to adverse global change. People are generally unaware that the bio-productive components of human urban ecosystems are actually rural hinterlands, increasingly dispersed across the planet by trade. He would ask his urban planning students: "What would happen to a city's millions of inhabitants if cut off from their supportive ecosystems?" Instead of viewing human settlements as isolated from nature, his research began to map the massive, unseen flows of energy and materials extracted from the ecosphere and required to sustain urban populations, as well as the equal flow of useless waste injected back into the ecosphere. This ecological framing – seeing cities and human economies as wholly embedded sub-systems of the biosphere – set the stage for Rees' articulation of the ecological footprint concept.

Academic career

William E. Rees was initially jointly appointed as Assistant Professor in the University of British Columbia's School of Community and Regional Planning (SCARP) and UBC's Institute for Animal Resource Ecology in September 1969. He was promoted to Associate Professor (1976) and Professor (1990), and became Professor Emeritus following his official retirement from UBC in 2012.

Rees taught 15 different courses at UBC from 1969–70 until his retirement in 2011–12. His long-running and interdisciplinary offerings spanned planning practice, environmental assessment, human ecology, and ecological economics. Courses included: Environmental Assessment; Ecological Basis of Planning; Urban Land-use Planning and Economic Change; Resource Analysis for Regional Planning; Enviro-Economic Systems (ecological economics); and Regional Planning Workshop, as well as graduate colloquia including an advanced workshop on Global Change, Complexity, and Panarchy.

Rees' research and teaching originally focused on project assessment and the biophysical prerequisites for sustainability in an era of accelerating ecological change. He developed a special interest in cities and in ecologically relevant metrics of urban sustainability, including urban ecological footprint analysis. These pursuits led to explorations of complexity theory, human socio-behavioural ecology, and beyond.

As of 2026, Rees remained Professor Emeritus at UBC. His most recent interests and publications explore the role of human evolution in the emergence of the contemporary (un)sustainability crisis. What are the neurobiological, cognitive, and cultural barriers to sustainability? How can we account for humanity's well-developed capacity for self-delusion? Rees has authored or co-authored hundreds of peer-reviewed papers, book chapters, and numerous popular articles on the above and related topics.

Active across disciplines, Rees was/is a long-term member of the Global Ecological Integrity Group, a fellow of the Post Carbon Institute, a founding member and past president of the Canadian Society for Ecological Economics, and co-founder of OneEarth Living, a nonprofit "think and do tank" advancing sustainable everyday living around the world. The influence of Rees' work is recognized and awarded. Rees has been invited to lecture on areas of his expertise across Canada and the United States, as well as in Mexico, many European countries, Australia, China, Thailand, Malaysia, Sri Lanka, Indonesia, Japan, South Korea, Brazil, Ecuador, and the former Soviet Union.

Within UBC's SCARP, Rees held various senior administrative roles, including Director (1 January 1994 – 30 June 1999). Later, he served as Associate Director of SCARP and the Centre for Human Settlements (2007–2009). Rees also contributed to departmental and university governance. Documented roles include chairing the SCARP Ph.D. Admissions Committee and as a member of UBC's Senior Appointments Committee (2002–2006), and a committee formed to define an undergraduate program in sustainability studies (1998–2000).

== Research Focus ==
Sustainability science generally

Rees' scholarly contributions examine the biophysical requirements for, and natural constraints on, industrial civilization, including the implications of the growing human ecological footprint for resource and public policy planning. He explores the question: "How can we integrate ecological constraints into planning and policy, given that mainstream economic logic practically ensures that human demand will exceed ecosystems' regenerative, assimilative capacities?" A key interest is in the role of energy in the expansion/sustainability of the human enterprise. Rees' research and teaching also explore the socio-cultural and human behavioural barriers to the sustainability transition. He wonders why high intelligence (e.g., the capacity for logical thought and reasoning from the evidence) plays such a small role in societal decision-making, particularly pertaining to sustainability.

Ecological overshoot

A central aim of Rees' recent scholarship is to raise consciousness about ecological overshoot, the systemic condition in which human activity depletes ecosystems faster than they can regenerate and generates wastes beyond nature's capacity to absorb them. Overshoot means that the human enterprise exceeds long-term global carrying capacity. This framing sees overshoot as a meta-crisis and the cause of multiple so-called environmental problems; its co-symptoms include global heating, plunging biodiversity, ocean acidification, land/soil degradation, tropical forest loss, pollution, etc. In this framing, the current global focus on global heating/climate change, (a serious problem) is actually a counterproductive distraction from its cause–overshoot, the fact that there are too many people consuming and polluting too much.

Ecological economics

Ecological economics attempts to restructure economics (resource extraction, allocation, and distribution) on a sound foundation of biophysical theory, particularly far-from-equilibrium thermodynamics. Rees argues that economic analysis must account for biophysical limits and ecological feedbacks, which would involve the implementation of degrowth dynamics when resource and waste constraints become binding. His 2020 article, "Ecological economics for humanity's plague phase," develops these arguments using ecological analogies of expansion and corrective feedback in complex systems.

Urban systems and ecological footprint

Rees contributes to debates on urban sustainability by applying ecological accounting concepts to cities and urbanization. His work on ecological footprints and "appropriated carrying capacity" argues that urban planning should acknowledge the crucial fact that cities' supportive land base typically lies far beyond usual municipal boundaries and that the provisioning of cities is dependent on continued availability of abundant cheap energy. This perspective considers the question: "Is further population growth and urbanization advisable in an era of growing energy uncertainty?" In a 2023 paper with Mathis Wackernagel, Rees reviewed the foundational principles of ecological footprint accounting, its role in sustainability debates, and major critiques of the method.

Human carrying capacity

Conventionally, economists have dismissed the concept of human carrying capacity on the grounds that human inventiveness, techno-efficiency and international trade free regional populations from biophysical constraints. Rees argues that ecological footprint accounting dissolves this argument. Instead of asking the traditional carrying capacity question, "How many people can this area support?" ecological footprint accounting inverts the question and asks, "How much productive land/water area is needed to support this population, wherever that land/water is located?"

According to Rees, by posing the carrying capacity question this way, ecological footprint accounting demonstrates that, far from freeing humans from the "environment," growing modern cities survive by drawing on an ever-greater, if unseen, area of productive ecosystems scattered all over the world. Rees argues that fossil-fueled growth has blown the urbanizing world far beyond long-term carrying capacity into ecological overshoot even at average (inadequate) material standards of living. As a consequence, energy and resource consumption and pollution by an expanding population now exceed what the planet can support indefinitely. Rees reminds policymakers that overshoot is, by definition, a terminal condition.

== Legacy and Influence ==
=== Ecological footprint ===
Rees' and his students' work helped establish the ecological footprint, a measure of the human load on Earth, as one of the most widely recognized global sustainability metrics. The term "ecological footprint" is an entry in the Oxford English Dictionary and has become part of the contemporary vernacular. The late biologist and naturalist E. O. Wilson called the ecological footprint "one of the most important environmental concepts today." The Post Carbon Institute describes it as the "world's best-known indicator of the (un)sustainability of techno industrial society."

Rees' legacy is closely tied to the ecological footprint concept; the Royal Society of Canada called it his "most influential contribution." Ecological footprint accounting has been acknowledged or used by governments at all levels, by major international organizations and agencies, and by dozens of private consulting firms to assess their or clients' demands on global biocapacity. The Global Footprint Network calls it "the world's premier measure of humanity's demand on nature." American environmentalist and entrepreneur Paul Hawken describes it as "the only standard by which we may calibrate our collective impact upon the planet." The World Wide Fund for Nature (WWF) adopted Ecological Footprint Analysis as a co-indicator of sustainability along with the WWF's own Living Planet Index. In short, the ecological footprint is an unusually successful example of an ecological concept crossing from the academic realm into public and policy language. Rees and other practitioners regret only that the method has not seriously constrained the ethic of perpetual growth.

=== Ecological economics ===
Rees has had a significant impact on ecological economics, as ecological footprint accounting is firmly rooted in ecological economic theory. Ecological footprint accounts show graphically that the economy is a growing subsystem within the non-growing biosphere and, while in overshoot, is depleting the finite resources – even essential self-producing resources – of Earth. Rees describes his work on ecological footprint accounting and ecological overshoot as efforts to reconnect humanity functionally to the natural world in ways that reflect better biophysical reality. This perspective distinguishes his work from mainstream economics by insisting that economic systems remain materially constrained by ecosystem dynamics, energy flows, and thermodynamic limits. Neoclassical economists and proponents of ecomodernism, such as the California-based Breakthrough Institute, have pushed back against Rees' theories, arguing that technological innovation and human ingenuity allow economies to decouple from environmental degradation, effectively expanding carrying capacity.

In April 2011, Rees was the only ecological economist invited to present that year at George Soros' Institute for New Economic Thinking (INET) Annual Conference at Bretton Woods, a high-level meeting of financiers and finance economists. His renegade paper was titled "Toward a Sustainable Global Economy."

=== Carrying capacity ===
Rees' work helped revive the debate about planetary limits and human carrying capacity. He had a major role in elevating discussions around ecological overshoot and the need to constrain consumption and reduce populations. Ecological footprint accounting shows unambiguously how much human demand on ecosystems has outpaced Earth's capacity to regenerate resources and absorb wastes. Swedish scientist Karl-Henrik Robèrt called the method "the most ingenious way of communicating unsustainability to the general public." In short, by explaining sustainability in simple-to-understand terms, Rees has helped elevate the concepts of ecological limits and overshoot to the forefront in sustainability discussions.

=== Educator ===
Rees has received praise from former students for his skill in teaching interdisciplinary science, describing his classes as "captivating," "compelling," and "exciting." In a feature on his retirement, the Vancouver-based news site The Tyee quoted former student Thomas Bevan as saying that Rees made the classroom safe for asking "the silliest questions."

== Ecological Footprint ==
Conceptual origins and development

Rees reasoned that the first question of personal human ecology should be: "How much of Earth's productive surface is dedicated to supporting just me in the lifestyle to which I am accustomed?" Using this as a conceptual starting point, Rees began exploring the validity of human carrying capacity using what he called the "Regional Capsule Concept." This model asked how large an impermeable glass bell-jar or capsule, placed over a study population–a well-known city, for example–would have to be in order to contain a sufficient area of global average productive and assimilative ecosystem area to support that population.

The transition to the now-famous "ecological footprint" terminology occurred purely by serendipity in 1990. While Rees was drafting a formal paper on regional capsule modelling, a colleague visited his office and asked how he was enjoying his new computer. Rees said he was delighted, particularly since it was a tower model that imposed a smaller "footprint" on his desk. Eureka! Recognizing the potential metaphorical power of that term, Rees immediately used his word processor's "find and replace" function to change every instance of "regional capsule" in his manuscript to "ecological footprint." From 1990 to 1994, Rees collaborated with his Ph.D student, Mathis Wackernagel, to formally develop the quantitative calculation method, culminating in their 1996 book, Our Ecological Footprint: Reducing Human Impact on the Earth.

Methodological framework

A detailed breakdown of the ecological footprint's current global calculation standards and national biocapacity data can be found in Wikipedia's ecological footprint article and at the Global Footprint Network (GFN). GFN was founded by Prof. Rees' former PhD student Mathis Wackernagel. Rees intended the ecological footprint concept to serve as a consciousness-raising tool to communicate biophysical reality to economists, other academics, and particularly the public. The metric's credibility derives from methodological strengths that are scientifically well-founded, consolidating measurable energy and material flows into a single concrete variable: the corresponding appropriated land and water (ecosystem) area.

The methodology is rooted in several sustainability indicators:

- It acknowledges that humans are biophysical entities that make constant metabolic demands on their supportive ecosystems and that all our manufactured capital imposes a parallel industrial metabolism on the ecosphere.
- It recognizes the crucial role of natural capital and natural income (biophysical stocks and flows) in economic development and sustainability.
- It accepts that the economy is a fully contained, growing, dependent subsystem of the non-growing biosphere.
- It recognizes the second law of thermodynamics as the ultimate governor of material transformations and economic activity, noting that beyond a certain (optimal) scale, the growth and maintenance of human enterprise must necessarily accelerate the entropic disordering and dissipation of the biosphere.
- It compares human demands to available biocapacity, allowing populations to calculate their ecological deficit, the difference between domestic biocapacity and a larger ecological footprint.
- It corresponds closely to and incorporates all the factors in Paul Ehrlich and John Holdren's widely known definition of human impact on the environment: I = PAT (Impact = Population x Affluence x Technology).

A 2023 article by Rees and Wackernagel provides a 30-year update on ecological footprint accounting.

Global adoption, policy influence and critiques

Ecological Footprint Analysis (EFA) has gained great popular acceptance because it personalizes sustainability by focusing on consumption. It encourages people to reflect on their personal consumption habits and allows nations to estimate their own ecological footprint as well as any "ecological deficit," the difference between domestic biocapacity and a larger ecological footprint.

The concept has also seen wide educational integration, with junior and high school textbooks adapting the tool for students. Today the metric is institutionalized and promoted by the Global Footprint Network, which tracks the ecological overshoot of over 200 countries, making it one of the most widely used sustainability indicators in global public policy. Even so, critics argue that Ecological Footprint Analysis is too static. They point out that it relies on agricultural yields per year (ignoring technological improvements in farming) and that it relies heavily on carbon land equivalence while ignoring ocean carbon sinks. Critics often label Rees' predictions of ecological overshoot as "neo-Malthusian" (referencing Thomas Malthus), arguing that his views on population contraction and degrowth are unnecessarily alarmist.

Additionally, in public climate discourse, the footprint has been criticized for emphasizing individual responsibility. This is in part because it has been used by the corporate sector in ways perceived to shift responsibility from corporations and governments onto individuals. For example, in 2005, fossil fuel company British Petroleum hired the advertising campaign Ogilvy to popularize the idea of a carbon footprint for individuals. The campaign instructed people to calculate their personal footprints and provided ways for people to "go on a low-carbon diet." This critique has occasionally contributed to broader skepticism toward footprint-based metrics, despite methodological differences between personal carbon footprinting and ecological footprint accounting, which compares demand on ecosystems with biocapacity.

In 2002, a Nature news report described skepticism by Danish political scientist Bjørn Lomborg's environmental policy group, including the arguments that there is no single "correct" ecological footprint and that footprint assessments ignored technological developments such as wind and solar electricity. In a published reply, Rees argued that ecological footprint analysis was developed to test claims that the economy was decoupling from nature (it isn't) and disputed the claim that footprint projections ignore renewable energy (RE) growth on grounds that if RE reduced consumption and emissions, the effect would show up in any subsequent eco-footprint study

== Major Intellectual Contributions (Philosophy) ==
Ecological overshoot

Rees describes ecological overshoot as the condition in which human demand on ecosystems exceeds Earth's capacity to regenerate bioregulators and absorb wastes. In this context, ecological footprint accounts enable us to estimate the extent to which humanity is living beyond available biocapacity.> Rees argued that overshoot undermines the idea of indefinite economic growth. The latter erroneously considers nature to be an externality and illogically assumes perfect substitutability between manufactured/financial capital and natural capital.

By contrast, Rees argues that modern growing economies remain dependent subsystems of the ecosphere, i.e., they are effectively contained by their supportive ecosystems. Growing economies still demand increasing flows of energy/materials from nature, imposing an increasing burden on productive land and on nature's waste assimilation processes. In short, growth is ultimately constrained by the finite capacity of the ecosphere. Rees notes that technological efficiency and market dynamics can delay or mask these limits, but cannot eliminate them. He states that: "Modern techno-industrial society is in a state of advanced overshoot. We are consuming and polluting the biophysical basis of our own existence." Continued growth to overshoot thus leads not to sustainability, but to irreversible resource depletion and over-reaching pressure on global life-support processes essential to human societies. This is a terminal condition.

Rees' publications and presentations on these concepts have helped reopen the debate on "alternatives to material growth." He argues that some widely promoted climate change "solutions" are distractions from the real eco-crisis, ecological overshoot, because they are not "fixing" the climate (most solutions, including wind turbines, solar panel installations and electric vehicles, are even fossil fuel dependent) and help to extend overshoot. He calls these faux solutions "business-as-usual-by-alternative-means."

Biophysical limits to growth

Biophysical limits to growth refers to Rees' and others' argument that human economies are materially embedded within the ecosphere and therefore cannot expand indefinitely on a finite planet. This view places Rees' analyses within ecological economics and distinguishes his work from mainstream models that treat growth as potentially indefinite through efficiency or novel technological solutions.

Rees argues that human societies and economies are constrained by ecological limits, including finite biocapacity and thermodynamic realities. His ecological footprint method underscores that the economy is increasingly embedded within (and dependent on) the ecosphere and that material transformations are governed by physical laws.

Human behaviour and sustainability

Rees' later research focuses heavily on the neurobiological, cognitive, and cultural barriers to sustainability. He suggests that the human enterprise is constrained not just by biophysical limits, but by human nature itself. According to Rees, Homo sapiens is biologically predisposed, much like any other species, to expand geographically, reproduce exponentially, and consume all available resources (i.e., H. sapiens is potentially unsustainable by nature). However, he posits that humans are victims of our own success; in our materially excessive overgrown world, we are now suffering from "human maladaptation syndrome." Our paleolithic brains, which evolved to manage life in small, egalitarian bands within unchanging habitats, are cognitively obsolete to comprehend the sheer complexity and rapid changes characteristic of global-scale systems; we are unable to cope with the crises that emerge from excess exploitation and hostile interactions between human and natural systems.

To overcome the causative, deeply ingrained, and now maladaptive behavioural tendencies, Rees argues that modern humans could, in theory, use our capacity for logical thought to raise to consciousness the behavioural sources of our predicament. Only then will we be able to devise cultural constraints that override these growth-oriented biological impulses. He acknowledges that the necessary personal-to-civilizational transformation will require 'writing' (and abiding by) new cultural narratives and policy frameworks that facilitate (heretofore unheard of) absolute reductions in consumption/pollution and populations as necessary, until humanity is functioning once again within the biophysical means of nature.

Solution space

Rees outlines radical and specific opportunities for change to avert societal collapse. He argues, for example, that mainstream climate solutions under global capitalism (such as the "alleged" transition to renewable energy) fail because they do not address the proximate cause, ecological overshoot and its cause, excessive industrialization (mostly capitalist) on a finite planet. Rather, they increase overshoot by augmenting the already excessive scale of industrial civilization. Instead, Rees' solution space advocates for intentional compound degrowth, calling for a planned contraction of human economies and populations toward a steady-state. This is the system's ideal in which human material demands and impacts are kept within Earth's productive and assimilative capacities.

To restore alignment with the planet's regenerative limits, Rees emphasizes the necessity for non-coercive, voluntary population decline, helped by enhanced access to birth control methods, improved family planning education, and greater economic independence for women. He also challenges society to assert "collective reason over instinct" and socially constructed narratives, shifting the emphasis away from the modern fixation on competitive individualism toward mutual support and community cooperation.

Ecological footprint accounting has become one of the most widely recognized indicators used in sustainability and education, but it has also been the subject of ongoing scholarly debate. Some economists have argued that the ecological footprint is not a comprehensive or fully transparent planning tool, raising conceptual criticisms. Eco-modernist critics have further argued that the ecological footprint can be misleading and provides weak guidance for policy evaluation.

Rees and Wackernagel have acknowledged recurring critiques, such as that the footprint does not capture all environmental impacts and is primarily deductive rather than predictive; they defend the approach as a synthetic accounting metric intended to complement, not replace, other indicators.

== Awards and honours ==
Over the course of his career, Rees received a large range of scholarships, fellowships, academic honours, and international awards. These awards showcase his early scholarly achievements and his later contributions to ecological economics and sustainability science.

- New College In-Course Scholarship, University of Toronto (1965–1966)
- National Research Council of Canada Postgraduate Scholarship (1966–1967)
- Ramsay Wright Scholarship, Department of Zoology, University of Toronto (1967–1968)
- National Research Council of Canada Postgraduate Scholarship (1967–1968)
- National Research Council of Canada Postgraduate Scholarship (1968–1969)
- Social Sciences and Humanities Research Council Study Leave Fellowship and Grant (1985–1986)
- Killam Senior Research Prize, University of British Columbia (1996)
- Named one of British Columbia's top / leading public intellectuals by the Vancouver Sun (2000)
- City of Barcelona 2004 Award (Multimedia Category), as a member of the winning team for the exhibition Inhabiting the World (awarded 10 February 2005)
- Elected Fellow of the Royal Society of Canada (FRSC) (2006)
- Pierre Elliott Trudeau Foundation Fellowship (2007–2010)
- Honorary Doctoral Degree, Laval University (2012)
- Kenneth Boulding Prize / Boulding Memorial Award in Ecological Economics (jointly with Mathis Wackernagel) (2012)
- Blue Planet Prize (jointly with Mathis Wackernagel) (2012)
- Herman Daly Award in Ecological Economics (2015)
- Dean's Medal of Distinction, UBC Faculty of Applied Science (2016)

== Key Organization Affiliations ==
Post Carbon Institute: Rees has been a Fellow since 2008/2009 at this think tank focused on helping the world transition away from fossil fuels and build resilient, sustainable communities.

Club of Rome: Rees served as a full member from 2014 to 2019. This international network of prominent scientists and economists is devoted to studying the complex interrelationships of global problems (the "world problematique"). The Club of Rome sponsored the (in)famous 1972 report The Limits to Growth.

Global Footprint Network: Rees helped institutionalize the footprint concept by serving as a founding adviser to GFN, an international nonprofit established in 2003 by his former PhD student and co-developer of Ecological Footprint Analysis, Mathis Wackernagel. GFN tracks the ecological footprints of all the world's countries, monitors global ecological overshoot, and manages the National Footprint Accounts (now located at York University).

OneEarth Living: In 2006, Rees was one of five co-founders of OneEarth Living, including sisters Vanessa and Dagmar Timmer, who continue to lead this organization. The Vancouver-based nonprofit "think-and-do tank" advances sustainable everyday living around the world.

Canadian Society for Ecological Economics (CANSEE): As a founding member and past-president, Rees helped establish this national chapter to bring together academics and policymakers to develop alternative economic models that operate within Earth's biophysical limits.

Royal Society of Canada (RSC): In 2006, Rees was elected a Fellow of the Royal Society of Canada (FRSC), the country's highest academic honour, recognizing his outstanding career contributions to ecological economics and sustainability science.

Great Transition Initiative: Rees serves as an associate fellow for this international network of scholars and activists, established under the aegis of the Global Scenario Group, analyzing the requirements for a transition to a sustainable global future.

== Representative publications ==
William E. Rees has written extensively across academic, policy, and public platforms. Biographies and source materials consistently describe him as the author or co-author of hundreds of peer-reviewed papers, book chapters, and popular articles.

In addition to academic papers, popular articles, and public presentations on ecological footprinting, ecological economics, sustainability, ecological overshoot, and the human ecological predicament, Rees' recent writing continues in a reflective public form through his "standstoreeson" platform on the online Substack application.

These are some of Rees' scholarly articles and popular publications:

- Rees, W.E. and K. Szocik. 2026. Overshoot and procreative ethics: at an ecological crossroads. Sustainability Science. https://doi.org/10.1007/s11625-026-01810-2
- Rees, W.E. 2026. Reframing the SDGs: Can they be tethered to reality? In N. Montesano Montessori and A.K. Lautensach (eds.). The Palgrave Handbook of Critical Approaches to the UN 2030 Sustainable Development Goals. Palgrave Macmillan. (in press)
- Rees, W.E., D. Appleby, A. Yamabe, V. Timmer, and D. Timmer. 2026. One-earth living explained. In M.J. Cohen, S. McGreevy, S. Lorek, R. Lambino, and M. Bengtsson (eds.). Handbook of Research on Sustainable Lifestyles. Cheltenham, UK. Edward Elgar Publishing.
- Rees, W.E. 2025. Energy overshoot. In L. Akenji, P.J. Vergragt, H. S. Brown, T.S.J. Smith, and L.M. Wallnöfer (eds.). Vocabulary for Sustainable Consumption and Lifestyles. Sustainable Consumption Research and Action Initiative. London, Routledge. https://doi.org/10.4324/9781003584056
- Rees, W.E. 2024. On being a snowflake in an avalanche: The catastrophe of overshoot and how to cope. Resilience 11 July 2024. https://www.resilience.org/stories/2024-07-11/on-being-a-snowflake-in-an-avalanche-the-catastrophe-of-overshoot-and-how-to-cope
- Rees, W.E. 2023. The human ecology of overshoot: Why a major 'population correction' is inevitable. World 4: 509–27. https://doi.org/10.3390/world4030032
- Rees, W.E. 2023. The human eco-predicament: Overshoot and the population conundrum. Vienna Yearbook of Population Research 21(1): 21–39. Vienna Institute of Demography of the Austrian Academy of Sciences. Vienna.
- Rees, W.E. and M. Wackernagel. 2023. Ecological Footprint Accounting: Thirty years and still gathering steam. Environment: Science and Policy for Sustainable Development 65(5): 5–18. https://doi.org/10.1080/00139157.2023.2225405
- Rees, W.E. 2022. Why Large Cities Won't Survive the Twenty-First Century. In R.C. Brears (ed.). The Palgrave Encyclopedia of Urban and Regional Futures. Palgrave Macmillan, Cham. https://doi.org/10.1007/978-3-030-87745-3_285
- Rees, W.E. 2020. The fractal biology of plague and the future of civilization. The Journal of Population and Sustainability 5(1): 15–30. https://www.whp-journals.co.uk/JPS/article/view/653/408
- Rees, W.E. 1996. Revisiting carrying capacity: Area-based indicators of sustainability. Population and Environment. 17(3): 195–215. https://doi.org/10.1007/BF02208489
- Merz, J.J., Barnard, P., Rees, W.E., Smith, D., Maroni, M., Rhodes, C.J., Dederer, J.H., Bajaj, N., Joy, M.K., Wiedmann, T., Sutherland, R. 2023. "World scientists' warning: the behavioural crisis driving ecological overshoot." Science Progress. 106: https://doi.org/10.1177/00368504231201372.
- Barnard, P., Moomaw, W.R., Fioramonti, L., Laurance, W.F., Mahmoud, M.I., O'Sullivan, J., Rapley, C.G., Rees, W.E., Rhodes, C.J., Ripple, W.R., Semiletov, I.P., Talberth, J., Tucker, C., Wysham, D., Ziervogel, G. 2021. "World scientists' warnings into action: local to global." Science Progress. 104: https://doi.org/10.1177/00368504211056290
- Rees, W.E. 2020 "MegaCities at Risk: The Climate–Energy Conundrum", chapter in: Sorensen, A and Labbe, D (eds.) The International Handbook on Megacities and Megacity Regions. Cheltenham: Edward Elgar.
- Rees, W.E. 2020. "Scorched Earth", foreword to H. Washington, What Can I do to Help Heal the Environmental Crisis, London: Earthscan (Routledge), p. xxii-xxvi.
- Rees, William E. (March 2020). "Ecological economics for humanity's plague phase". Ecological Economics. 169 106519. Bibcode:2020EcoEc.16906519R. doi:10.1016/j.ecolecon.2019.106519. S2CID 209502532.
- Rees, W.E. 2019. "Avoiding the 'Endarkenment'", foreword to J Bell and J Marlow, Sketches of the History of Science, Montreal: Champlain St-Lambert, p. ix –xi.
- Rees, William (26 June 2019). "Why Place-Based Food Systems? Food Security in a Chaotic World". Journal of Agriculture, Food Systems, and Community Development: 1–9. doi:10.5304/jafscd.2019.091.014.
- Rees, W.E. 2019 "End Game – The economy as eco-catastrophe and what needs to change". Real-World Economics Review ( March 2019) at http://www.paecon.net/PAEReview/issue87/Rees87.pdf
- Rees, W.E. 2018. "Planning in the Anthropocene", Chapter 5 in: M Gunder, A Madinipour and V Watson (eds), The Routledge Handbook of Planning Theory. New York: Routledge.
- Rees, W.E. 2017. "Going Down? Human Nature, Growth and (Un)sustainability," Chapter 22 in: PA Victor, B Dolter (eds), Handbook on Growth and Sustainability. Cheltenham, UK: Edward Elgar.
- Rees, W.E. 2013. "Ecological Footprint, Concept of." In: Levin S.A. (ed.) Encyclopedia of Biodiversity, second edition, Vol. 2: 701–713. Waltham, MA: Academic Press.
- Rees, William (October 2010). "What's blocking sustainability? Human nature, cognition, and denial". Sustainability: Science, Practice and Policy. 6 (2): 13–25. Bibcode:2010SSPP....6...13R. doi:10.1080/15487733.2010.11908046. S2CID 8188578.
- Rees, W.E. 2010. "True Cost Economics". Chapter in the Berkshire Encyclopedia of Sustainability, Vol 2, The Business of Sustainability. C. Lazlo et al. eds. Berkshire Publishing Group.
- Rees, W.E. 2010 "The Roots of Our Crises: Does Human Nature Drive Us Toward Collapse?" Chapter 6 in: D Lerch (ed), The Community Resilience Reader. Washington, Island Press (for the Post Carbon Institute.)
- Rees, W.E. 2006. "Ecological Footprints and Bio-Capacity: Essential Elements in Sustainability Assessment." Chapter 9 in Jo Dewulf and Herman Van Langenhove (eds) Renewables-Based Technology: Sustainability Assessment, pp. 143–158. Chichester, UK: John Wiley and Sons.
- Rees, W.E. 2006. "Why Conventional Economic Logic Won't Protect Biodiversity." Chapter 14 in D.M. Lavigne (ed.). Gaining Ground: In Pursuit of Ecological Sustainability, pp. 207–226. International Fund for Animal Welfare, Guelph, Canada, and the University of Limerick, Limerick, Ireland.
- Rees, W.E. 2004." Is Humanity Fatally Successful?" Journal of Business Administration and Policy Analysis 30-31: 67-100 (2002–2003).
- Rees, W.E. 2003. "Understanding Urban Ecosystems: An Ecological Economics Perspective." Chapter in Alan Berkowitz et al.eds., Understanding Urban Ecosystems. New York: Springer-Verlag.
- Rees, W.E. 2002. "Globalization and Sustainability: Conflict or Convergence?" Bulletin of Science, Technology and Society 22 (4): 249–268.
- Rees, William E. (October 1992). "Ecological footprints and appropriated carrying capacity: what urban economics leaves out". Environment and Urbanization. 4 (2): 121–130. Bibcode:1992EnUrb...4..121R. doi:10.1177/095624789200400212. S2CID 153374382.
- Moore, J and W.E. Rees. 2013. "Getting to One Planet Living". Chapter 4 in: State of the World 2013 – Is Sustainability Still Possible? Washington, World Watch Institute.
- Kissinger, M. & W.E. Rees. 2010. "An interregional ecological approach for modelling sustainability in a globalizing world—Reviewing existing approaches and emerging directions." Ecological Modelling 221(21):2615-2623.
- Kissinger, M & W.E. Rees. 2010. "Importing terrestrial biocapacity: The U.S. case and global implications." Land Use Policy 27: 589–599.
- Kissinger, M & W.E. Rees. 2009. "Footprints on the Prairies: Degradation and Sustainability of Canadian Agriculture in a Globalizing world." Ecological Economics 68: 2309–2315
- Wackernagel, M. and W. Rees. 1996. Our Ecological Footprint: Reducing Human Impact on the Earth. New Society Publishers.
