= Ecological overshoot =

Demands on ecosystem exceeding regeneration

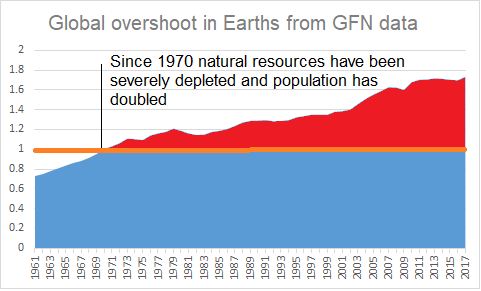
Ecological overshoot expressed in terms of how many Earths equivalent of natural resources are consumed by humanity each year.

Ecological overshoot is the phenomenon which occurs when the demands made on a natural ecosystem exceed its regenerative capacity. Global ecological overshoot occurs when the demands made by humanity exceed what the biosphere of Earth can provide through its capacity for renewal. Scientific use of the term in the context of the global ecological impact of humanity is attributed to a 1980 book by William R. Catton, Jr. titled Overshoot: The Ecological Basis of Revolutionary Change.

== Measurement of ecological overshoot ==
To determine whether ecological overshoot is happening requires the collection of global and nation-specific data regarding the availability of natural resources, the capability of the ecosystems to renew any natural resources that were consumed, and the rate at which the resources are being consumed, usually assessed for each calendar year.

This data collection, and analysis is typically done by scientific and conservation organisations, such as the Global Footprint Network, which aggregates data to assess the ecological footprint of each country and the global community.

These ecological resource accounts reveal that the global community has been exceeding the regenerative capacity of the Earth since 1970, which was the year when the consumption capacity of humanity first exceeded Earth's biocapacity. Each year since 1970 humanity has witnessed global ecological overshoot.

=== Biocapacity ===
The data collected by the Global Footprint Network (GFN) makes the assumption that the whole biocapacity of the Earth is entirely at the disposal of humanity.

The biocapacity is measured by calculating the amount of biologically productive land and sea area available to provide the resources a population consumes and to absorb its wastes, given the prevailing technology and management practices. Countries differ in the productivity of their ecosystems, and this is reflected in the National Footprint and Biocapacity Accounts kept by York University, FoDaFo and Global Footprint Network. A country has an ecological reserve if its Ecological footprint is smaller than its biocapacity; otherwise it is operating with an ecological overshoot. The former are often referred to as ecological creditors, and the latter as ecological debtors. Today, most countries, and the world as a whole, are in ecological overshoot. Over 85% of the world population lives in countries operating with an ecological overshoot.

=== Earth Overshoot Day ===
Humans' overconsumption of Earth's resources has grown progressively over decades, as illustrated by the concept of Earth Overshoot Day.

This problem is highlighted each year on Earth Overshoot Day, an illustrative calendar date obtained through calculation, on which day humanity's resource consumption for the year is considered to have exceeded the Earth's capacity to regenerate those resources for that year.

== Drivers ==
A crisis of human behaviour (the Human Behavioural Crisis) has been highlighted as the driver of anthropogenic ecological overshoot in a peer-reviewed World Scientists' Warning paper led by Joseph J. Merz and co-authored by William E. Rees, Phoebe Barnard et al.

According to Nikolay S. Ivanov, Arian Z. Abilmagzhanov, et al., modern society is facing a growing problem of municipal solid waste management caused by rapid population growth, increasing consumption and inefficient waste management systems. This leads to serious environmental and socio-economic consequences.

== Related risks ==
In 2024, fourteen academics well known for their publications and efforts to warn humanity about the dangers of ongoing climate change published a "Special Report" in the journal BioScience where they attributed the "risk of societal collapse" to the underlying cause of "overshoot."

== See also ==
- Anthropocene – Proposed geologic epoch
- Earth Overshoot Day – Calculated calendar date when humanity's yearly consumption exceeds Earth's replenishment
- Ecological footprint – Individual's or a group's human demand on nature
- Biocapacity – Estimate of an ecosystem's production of certain biological materials
- Overshoot (population) – Phenomenon in which populations temporarily exceed carrying capacity of environment
- Planetary boundaries – Limits to safe impact on the Earth ecology
