= Phoebe Barnard =

American global change scientist

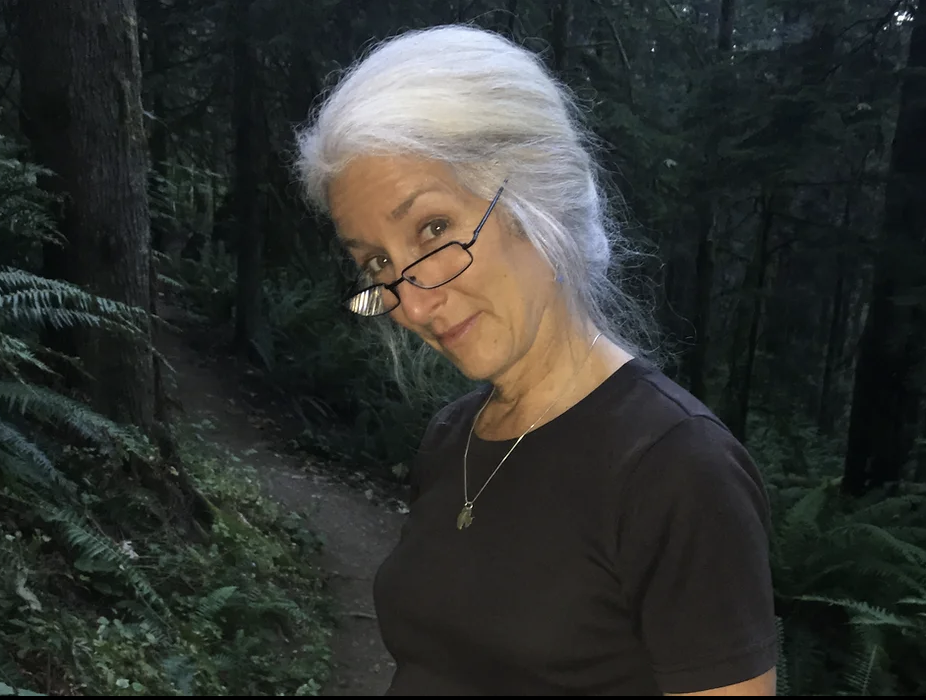
Barnard in the Chuckanut Forest, Washington, USA, circa 2020

Phoebe Elizabeth Barnard (born June 10, 1961) is an American global change scientist and professor of conservation biology and environmental futures at the University of Washington. Barnard has written more than 180 publications on the vulnerability of biodiversity and ecosystems to climate and land use change. She is a member of several global initiatives including the Club of Rome's Planetary Emergency Partnership and Ecocivilization Coalition, one of five core co-authors of the 2020 paper World Scientists’ Warning of a Climate Emergency, lead author of the action-focused 2021 World Scientists' Warnings into Action: Local to Global, second of 11 co-authors of the 2023 World Scientists' Warning: the Behavioural Crisis Driving Ecological Overshoot, a provocative collaboration of scientists, educators and global marketing strategists, and major co-author of Earth at Risk: an Urgent Call to End the Age of Destruction and Forge a Just and Sustainable Future.

Impatient with warnings, Barnard has focused on bold global actions. In 2021, she co-founded and led for two years the Stable Planet Alliance, a global coalition of organizations working to reduce ecological overshoot. In late 2022, she and John D. Liu started the Global Restoration Collaborative, a global coalition of organizations working to restore ecosystems, climate, biodiversity and human connection with Nature while upskilling and co-designing with leaders from youth, women, indigenous and technical networks. Her ideas on the crossroads of civilization and collaborative solutions are increasingly influencing organizational plans and visions of the EcoRestoration Alliance, Institute for Ecological Civilization, Planetary Emergency Partnership of the Club of Rome, and others. Barnard has mentored hundreds of young professionals, especially women conservation scientists, across Africa, the Americas, Europe and Asia.

Barnard and John Bowey co-produced from 2022-2025 a four-film global documentary series exploring the fast-changing world of climate and ecosystem restoration solutions, in the context of this crossroads, called The Climate Restorers, which is broadcasting in five countries.

== Education ==
Barnard fled a large public high school for the small and creative Bancroft School and graduated with highest honors in 1979. Moving to the maritime provinces of Canada, Barnard graduated in 1983 with a BSc (Hons) in biology from Acadia University with minors in geology and education, specializing in ornithology and evolutionary ecology. She then earned MSc and PhD degrees in environmental sciences, especially behavioral ecology and evolution, from University of the Witwatersrand in South Africa (1990, with distinction) and Uppsala University in Sweden (1994), the latter working under the prolific and cross-pollinating evolutionary ecologist Anders Pape Møller.

== Career ==
Barnard founded and led the Government of Namibia’s first national biodiversity and climate change programs. She led a collaborative study of biological diversity of Namibia and the collaborative development and publication of Namibia's first national biodiversity strategy and action plan for the years 2001–2010, among policy drafts, a national park proposal and other accomplishments.

Barnard was on the board and executive committee shaping the Millennium Ecosystem Assessment, which evaluated the status and trends of Earth's ecosystems and their capacity to support human health, well-being and economic activities.

From 2005 to 2016, she worked as a principal and then lead scientist at the South African National Biodiversity Institute on climate change bioadaptation and biodiversity futures.

During this time, she co-led an international research team on species’ vulnerability to past, present and future climates. She also coordinated the development of a biodiversity early warning system and policy applications for South Africa.

In 2016, Barnard was a participant in a leadership expedition to Antarctica with the global STEM women's collaborative leadership program Homeward Bound. She is a member of its Busara Circle of 10 distinguished elder women mentors for the program including legendary climate diplomat, activist and writer Christiana Figueres.

Moving back to the United States in 2017, Barnard ran the Pacific Biodiversity Institute through a difficult transition after a predecessor's financial mismanagement, successfully merging its staff, data and other assets into three stronger, better resourced institutions. She served as chief science and policy officer for the Conservation Biology Institute and co-founded and led the Stable Planet Alliance until 2023. She now co-develops and co-leads with youth, women and academic and funding partners the Global Restoration Collaborative, a participatory initiative to accelerate and upscale ecosystem restoration, climate restoration and carbon removal during and beyond the UN Decade on Ecosystem Restoration through transformative global collaboration and acceleration of previously siloed, but like-minded initiatives on climate, biodiversity, society and leadership.

In 2026, Barnard moved to Oxford to establish the Global Restoration Collaborative as a visible global movement: a global research, action and communications collaborative on planetary and societal futures. She has also focused in 2025 on leading two global initiatives - to support unmet financial needs of important transformative initiatives and organizations, and Future Preparedness, a top-level team to support national and sub-national governments to govern wisely, collaboratively and proactively in much riskier, less predictable and less stable times. She has referred publicly, on both community radio and social media podcasts, to urgent and transformative societal actions at these crossroads of human history as 'civilizational shift,' a term now rapidly picking up popularity.

== Research ==
Barnard has written and edited over 180 peer-reviewed scientific and policy publications, including books, reports, chapters and papers on biodiversity, global change, early warning systems, climate resilience, ornithology, ecological overshoot and the crossroads of humanity

She is one of five core co-authors of the 2020 paper World Scientists’ Warning of a Climate Emergency, co-signed by more than 15,484 scientists from 163 countries. She is also lead author of the 2021 paper World Scientists’ Warnings into Action: Local to Global in Science Progress (for COP26), co-signed so far by 3000+ scientists from 110+ countries. Impatient with the dry strictures of scientific publications, she increasingly balances peer-reviewed journals with popular and policy summaries, public speaking and writing, and from 2013 onwards, filmmaking for greater societal impact.

== Filmmaking ==
Barnard and John Bowey have co-produced short- and long-format documentaries on big issues for society and the planet since 2018, including My Otherland and The Climate Restorers. She has contributed script and strategic elements to a number of Bowey's other productions as a co-producer. They are now busy with a new short-format news-magazine project on climate repair and societal change, and Climate in a Time of Conflict, a moving documentary on Ukraine's fortitude, innovation and decarbonization while coping with military invasion, climate change, soil contamination and geopolitical turbulence.

== Awards and recognition ==
Barnard received a Fulbright Program Full Doctoral Grant in 1993-1994 and a Society for Conservation Biology Distinguished Service Award in 2002. She was also recognized by the University of Washington in 2017 with an affiliate full professorship in conservation biology and environmental futures, and by the University of Oxford in 2026 with an honorary research fellowship at the School of Geography and the Environment's Leverhulme Centre for Nature Recovery. In 2019 she received the Forbes Award for Distinguished Professional Achievement from her alma mater, the Bancroft School.
