= Rashid Hassan =

Economics professor in Pretoria

Rashid Mekki Hassan

Academic background
- Education: University of Khartoum(BSc.) (MSc.); Iowa State University (MSc) (Ph.D.)

Academic work
- Discipline: Environmental economics Ecological economics
- Institutions: University of Pretoria
- Awards: ISEE Kenneth Boulding Award for Ecological Economics (2020)

Rashid Mekki Hassan is the Professor and Director at the Centre for Environmental Economics and Policy in Africa (CEEPA) at the University of Pretoria. He specialises in natural resource and environmental economics, agricultural economics, and optimisation and modelling of economic systems.

== Education ==
Hassan holds a BSc and MSc., both in Agricultural Economics, from the University of Khartoum in 1977 and 1983 respectively. He proceeded to Iowa State University where he got MSc and Ph.D. degrees, both in Economics, in 1988 and 1989 respectively.

== Career ==
Hassan is the professor of economics at the University of Pretoria where he studies natural resources management.

He has authored co-authored and co-edited journal articles and books on Water management in the South Africa which has been used to chart the efficiency of use of water.

He was elected a foreign associate of the US National Academy of Sciences in April 2019.

== Select publications ==
=== Books ===
The books which Hassan has authored, co-authored, or co-edited include:

- Rashid M. Hassan; Glenn-Marie Lange; Jaap Arntzen; Jackie Crawford; Eric Mungatana (2007). The Economics of Water Management in southern Africa: an environmental accounting approach. Edward Elgar Publishing. doi:10.4337/9781847203021. ISBN 9781843764724.

=== Journal articles ===
Hassan has written dozens of articles including:

- Rashid Hassan; Eric Mungatana; Glenn-Marie Lange (2007). "Water accounting for the Orange River Basin: An economic perspective on managing a transboundary resource". Ecological Economics. 61 (4): 660–670. doi:10.1016/j.ecolecon.2006.07.032.
- Rashid M. Hassan; Temesgen Tadesse Deressa; Claudia Ringler; Tekie Alemu; Mahmud Yesuf (2009). "Determinants of farmers' choice of adaptation methods to climate change in the Nile Basin of Ethiopia". Global Environmental Change. 19 (2): 248–255. doi:10.1016/j.gloenvcha.2009.01.002. hdl:2263/9270.
