= Ecosphere (planetary) =

Planetary closed ecological system

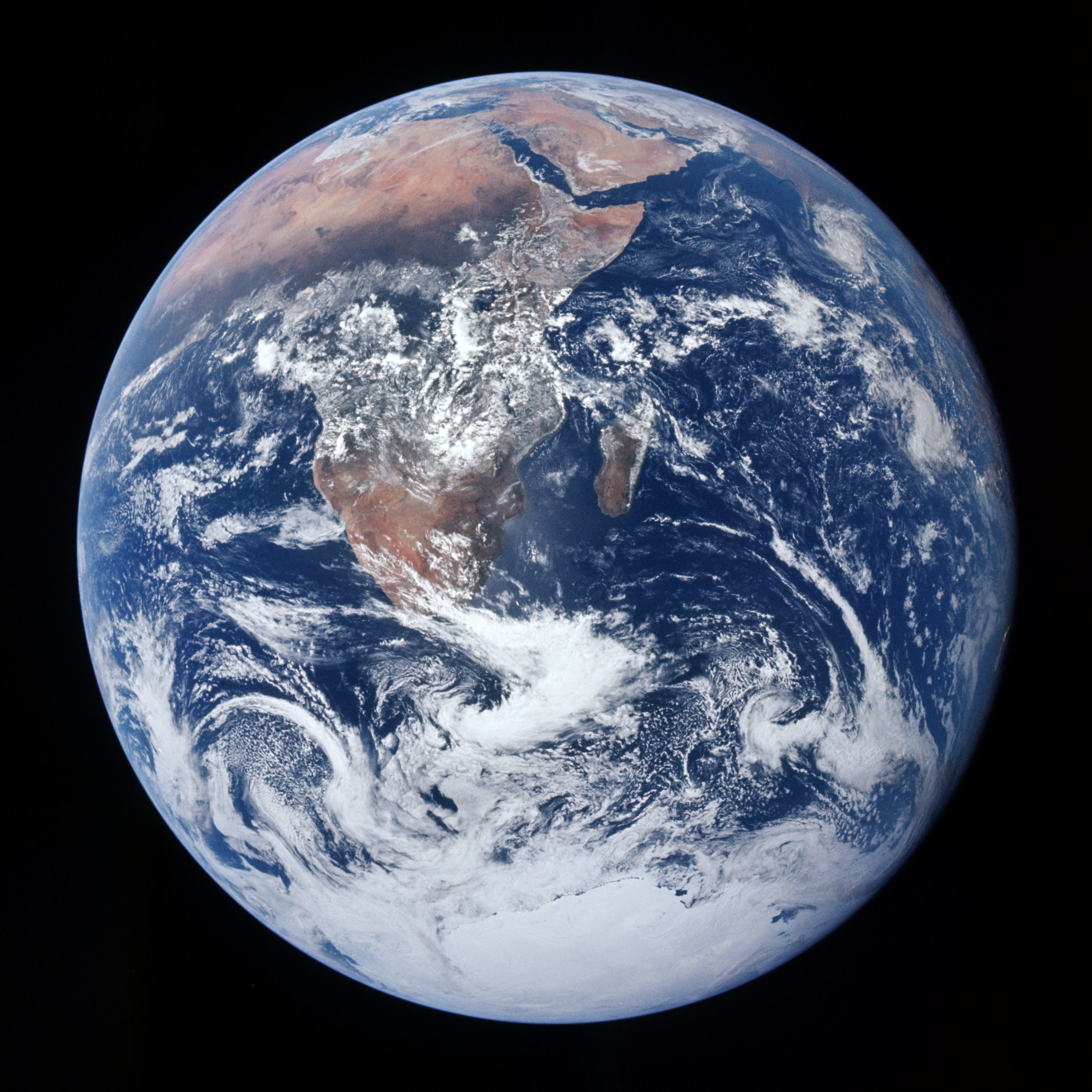
A view of the Earth's ecosphere

An ecosphere is a closed ecological system for a planet. In this global ecosystem, the various forms of energy and matter that constitute a given planet interact on a continual basis. The forces of the four Fundamental interactions cause the various forms of matter to settle into identifiable layers. These layers are referred to as component spheres with the type and extent of each component sphere varying significantly from one particular ecosphere to another. Component spheres that represent a significant portion of an ecosphere are referred to as primary component spheres. For instance, Earth's ecosphere consists of five primary component spheres: the Geosphere, Hydrosphere, Biosphere, Atmosphere, and Magnetosphere.

== Types of component spheres ==
=== Geosphere ===
The layer of an ecosphere that exists at a Terrestrial planet's Center of mass and which extends radially outward until ending in a solid and spherical layer known as the Crust (geology). This includes rocks and minerals that are present on the Earth as well as parts of soil and skeletal remains of animals that have become fossilized over the years. This is all about process how rocks metamorphosize. They go through solids to weathered to washing away and back to being buried and resurrected. The primary agent driving these processes is the movement of Earth's tectonic plates, which creates mountains, volcanoes, and ocean basins. The inner core of the Earth contains liquid iron, which is an important factor in the geosphere as well as the magnetosphere.

=== Hydrosphere ===
The total mass of water, regardless of phase (e.g. liquid, solid, gas), that exists within an ecosphere. It's possible for the hydrosphere to be highly distributed throughout other component spheres such as the geosphere and atmosphere. There are about 1.4 billion km^{3} of water on Earth. That includes liquid water in the ocean, lakes, and rivers. It includes frozen water in snow, ice, and glaciers, and water that's underground in soils and rocks. It also includes water that is in the atmosphere as clouds and vapor. Water is always on the move changing from a solid to vapor to ice and back to water. Water stays on the Earth for various amounts of time. It can be minutes, days or years and it doesn't have any set schedule. A drop of water can be in the ocean for years, or evaporate after a few days. Water is constantly changing and moving forms. Climate change can alter the life of a drop of water. With global warming, water evaporates faster and the cycle keeps moving at faster rates. The key here is the water cycle and how this works on a daily basis.

=== Biosphere ===
All living organisms that exist within a given ecosphere. J.B. Lamarck defined the term biosphere. When modern biologists mention the biosphere they usually mean the best part of the Earth's crust, which is the lithosphere and hydrosphere, and of the lower parts of the Earth's lower parts, which is the troposphere. All these together and the living organisms make up the biosphere. Other authorities go further and define the biosphere as " the space of our planet that is taken up by living beings" or as " that part of the Earth's crust, of its hydrosphere and atmosphere, that builds the environment for life".

=== Atmosphere ===
The layer of an ecosphere that exists as a gas. The atmosphere is the most distant component sphere of matter from the planet's Center of mass, beyond which is Outer space.

The whole mass of air surrounding the Earth, the density of the atmosphere decreases outward, which pushes the oxygen inward allowing humans to breathe without consequence. The general circulation of the atmosphere is defined as the zonally and temporally averaged wind and temperature fields.

=== Magnetosphere ===
The magnetic field of an ecosphere along with the charged particles that are being controlled by that magnetic field.

The Earth is one large magnet that is continuously subjected to plasma flow. The plasma flow is the solar wind that is propelled from the Sun. The interaction between solar wind and geomagnetic field eventually combine to result in the formation of an electrical current layer, which is called the magnetopause. This electric current layer confines the Earth's magnetic field. The region in which the magnetopause is enclosed in is known as the magnetosphere.

== See also ==
- Outline of Earth sciences
