= Global Footprint Network =

Ecological organization

National ecological surplus or deficit, measured as a country's biocapacity per person (in global hectares) minus its ecological footprint per person (also in global hectares). Data from 2013.: x ≤ -9 -9 < x ≤ -8 -8 < x ≤ -7 -7 < x ≤ -6 -6 < x ≤ -5 / -5 < x ≤ -4 -4 < x ≤ -3 -3 < x ≤ -2 -2 < x ≤ -1 -1 < x < 0 / 0 ≤ x < 2 2 ≤ x < 4 4 ≤ x < 6 6 ≤ x < 8 8 ≤ x Data unavailable

The Global Footprint Network was founded in 2003 and is an independent think tank originally based in the United States, Belgium and Switzerland. It was established as a charitable not-for-profit organization in each of those three countries. Its aim is to develop and promote tools for advancing sustainability, including the ecological footprint and biocapacity, which measure the amount of resources we use and how much we have. These tools aim at bringing ecological limits to the center of decision-making.

== Work ==
Global Footprint Network's goal is to create a future where all humans can live well, within the means of one planet Earth. The organization is headquartered in Oakland, California. The Network brings together over 70 partner organizations, including WWF International, ICLEI, Bank Sarasin, The Pictet Group, the New Economics Foundation, Pronatura México, and the Environment Agency Abu Dhabi.

=== National Footprint and Biocapacity Accounts ===
Every year, Global Footprint Network produced a new edition of its National Footprint and Biocapacity Accounts, which calculate Ecological Footprint and biocapacity of more than 200 countries and territories from 1961 to the present. Based on up to 15,000 data points per country per year, these data have been used to influence policy in more than a dozen countries, including Ecuador, France, Germany, Japan, Korea, the Philippines, Russia, Switzerland, and the United Arab Emirates. Since 2019, the National Footprint and Biocapacity Accounts are produced in collaboration between Global Footprint Network, York University, and Footprint Data Foundation.

The 2022 Edition of the National Footprint and Biocapacity Accounts cover 1961-2018 (latest UN data available), and incorporate data from the Food and Agriculture Organization, the UN Comtrade database, the International Energy Agency, and over 20 other sources.

=== Ecological Footprint Explorer ===
In April 2017, Global Footprint Network launched the Ecological Footprint Explorer, an open data platform for the National Footprint and Biocapacity Accounts. The website provides ecological footprint results for over 200 countries and territories, and encourages researchers, analysts, and decision-makers to visualize and download data.

== Earth Overshoot Day ==
The inward spiral shows how humans have progressively used more of Earth's resources than the planet can regenerate. Earth's ability to regenerate consumed resources now lasts only about 57% as long as in 1971.

Previously known as Ecological Debt Day, Earth Overshoot Day is the day when humanity has exhausted nature's budget for the year. For the rest of the year, society operates in ecological overshoot by drawing down local resource stocks and accumulating carbon dioxide in the atmosphere. In 2025, Earth Overshoot Day advanced to 24 July.

== Founding ==
In 2003, Mathis Wackernagel, PhD, and Susan Burns founded Global Footprint Network, an international think-tank headquartered in Oakland, California, with offices in Geneva and Brussels. Wackernagel received an honorary doctorate in December 2007 from the University of Bern in Switzerland.

== Leadership ==
- Co-founder & President: Dr. Mathis Wackernagel
- Co-founder: Susan Burns
- Chief Executive Officer: Laurel Hanscom
- Chief Science Officer: Dr. David Lin
- Director, Marketing & Communications: Amanda Diep
- Director, Mediterranean and MENA Regions: Dr. Alessandro Galli
- Board Chair: Keith Tuffley
- Honorary Chair: Swiss entrepreneur and investor André Hoffmann

== Awards and honours ==
- Nobel Sustainability Trust Leadership and Implementation Award 2024 to Mathis Wackernagel
- World Sustainability Award 2018
- International Association for Impact Assessment's Global Environment Award 2015
- RECYCLAPOLIS National Sustainability Award 2015
- ISSP Sustainability Hall of Fame Inductees Susan Burns and Mathis Wackernagel 2014
- Prix Nature Swisscanto 2013
- Global Footprint Network was recognized as one of the top 100 NGOs worldwide by the Global Journal in 2012 and 2013.
- Blue Planet Prize 2012
- Boulding Award 2012
- Binding Prize 2012

== See also ==
- Ecological footprint
- Carrying capacity
- Demography
- Human overpopulation
- New Economics Foundation
- Sustainable development
