= Mathis Wackernagel =

Swiss-born sustainability advocate (born 1962)

- Born: 10 November 1962 (age 63); Basel, Switzerland
- Education: Ph.D. in Community and Regional Planning
- Occupation: President
- Employer: Global Footprint Network
- Known for: creating the ecological footprint concept, promoting Earth Overshoot Day
- Website: http://footprintnetwork.org/

Mathis Wackernagel is a Swiss-born sustainability advocate. He is President of Global Footprint Network, an international sustainability think tank with offices in Oakland, California, and Geneva, Switzerland. The think-tank is a non-profit that focuses on developing and promoting metrics for sustainability.

After earning a degree in mechanical engineering from the Swiss Federal Institute of Technology, he completed his Ph.D. in community and regional planning at the University of British Columbia in Vancouver, Canada in 1994. There, in his doctoral dissertation under Professor William Rees, he worked with Rees in creating the ecological footprint concept and developed the accounting methodology for it. He has worked on sustainability issues for organizations in Europe, Latin America, North America, Asia and Australia. Wackernagel previously served as the director of the Sustainability Program at Redefining Progress in Oakland, California (1999 - 2003), and directed the Centre for Sustainability Studies / Centro de Estudios para la Sustentabilidad in Mexico (1995-2001). In 2004, he was also adjunct faculty at SAGE of the University of Wisconsin–Madison. In 2010, he was appointed Frank H. T. Rhodes Class of 1956 Visiting Professor at Cornell University (1 July 2011 – 30 June 2013). Wackernagel was a member of the Global Business Network.

Wackernagel has said that "Overshoot will ultimately liquidate the planet's ecological assets." He also noted that "We look at all the problems in separate ways – climate change or biodiversity loss or food shortage – as if they were occurring independently. But they're all symptoms of the same underlying theme: that our collective metabolism, the amount of things that humanity uses, has become very big compared to what Earth can renew."

== Awards and honors ==
Università di Siena awarded Mathis Wackernagel with an honorary degree on March 21, 2025, for which he provided a "lectio magistralis".

On November 21, 2024, the Nobel Sustainability Trust awarded Wackernagel with the Award for Leadership in Implementation. It is the second year the Trust has bestowed this honor; the first time they imparted the implementation award to Nicolas Stern.

In November 2022, the University of Stirling presented Wackernagel with an honorary doctorate. In his address, he proposed a "question with which to start everything – whether you design a policy or develop any new strategy [...]: do you love people?"

In 2018, Wackernagel and Zhifu Mi were the joint recipients of the second World Sustainability Award. Wackernagel, along with Susan Burns, received the Skoll Award for Social Entrepreneurship from the Skoll Foundation in 2007. He received an honorary doctorate from the University of Bern in 2007, a 2006 World Wide Fund for Nature Award for Conservation Merit, and the 2005 Herman Daly Award of the US Society for Ecological Economics. With Global Footprint Network, he received the International Prize Calouste Gulbenkian 2008 (Lisbon, Portugal) “dedicated to the respect for biodiversity and defense of the environment in man's relationship with nature.”

In 2013, Wackernagel received the Prix Nature Swisscanto. Prior, he received the 2012 Binding-Prize for Nature Conservation, the bi-annual Kenneth Boulding Award of the International Society for Ecological Economics, and the Blue Planet Prize of the Asahi Glass Foundation (the latter two with William E. Rees). He also received the 2011 Zayed International Prize for Environment in the category "action leading to positive change in society." The Zayed prize recognized Wackernagel's contribution to “translate[ing] the complexity of humanity's impact on the environment and natural resources into a more understandable and actionable form. The concept of ‘ecological limits' and relating the demands of human beings to the planet's available ecological resources, has attracted and is catalyzing action among governments, business and civil society."

The (En)Rich List ranked Wackernagel as the 19th of the 100 most inspirational individuals whose contributions enrich paths to sustainable futures.

== Published works ==
- Our Ecological Footprint: Reducing Human Impact on the Earth (with Williams E. Rees, and Phil Testemale, 1995, New Society Publishers) ISBN 0-86571-312-X
- Ecological Footprint: Managing our Biocapacity Budget (with Bert Beyers, 2019, New Society Publishers) ISBN 978-0-86571-911-8
- Sharing Nature's Interest (with Nicky Chambers and Craig Simmons, 2001) ISBN 1-85383-738-5
- The Winners and Losers in Global Competition: Why Eco-Efficiency Reinforces Competitiveness: A Study of 44 Nations (with Andreas Sturm, 2003) ISBN 1-55753-357-1
- Der Ecological Footprint. Die Welt neu vermessen. (with Bert Beyers)
  - 2010, ISBN 3-931705-32-3
  - 2016, ISBN 978-3863930745 (with updated figures)
- MDPI-Sustainability, 2019, "Defying the Footprint Oracle: Implications of Country Resource Trends" (open access)
- Frontiers in Energy Research, 2017, "Making the Sustainable Development Goals Consistent with Sustainability" (open access)
- Planetary Prosperity Means Zero Carbon, Impakter.com, 2017
- Are the Sustainable Development Goals Already in Trouble?, Impakter.com, 2017

== Interviews with Wackernagel ==
- 5th Switzerland. "A Man's Fight for our Survival.," also available on Apple, January 2023
- Cosmos Magazine. "Finding Australia's biocapacity: Dr Mathis Wackernagel explains biocapacity and how it's calculated" April 2022
- Swissinfo.com. "The Swiss man behind the Ecological Footprint" April 2022
- Research Outreach. "Measure what you treasure" April 2019
- Natural Intelligence. PodCast. "Balancing our Account with Nature" September 2019
- La Vanguardia (in Spanish). "La Tierra tiene un límite, pero la avaricia de algunos, no" November 2017

== Websites and videos ==
- Website of Mathis Wackernagel
- Website on Global Footprint Network
- Website on Earth Overshoot Day
- Website on Switzerland's resource security - «Watch out, dear Switzerland!»
- Video: Choosing your future in the era of ecological overshoot | David Lin & Mathis Wackernagel, RE:WIRED Green, San Francisco, September 2022
- Video: How much Nature do we have? How much do we use? | Mathis Wackernagel, TEDxSanFrancisco 2016
- Video: Mathis Wackernagel on Whole Earth Systems | at the 2018 Saint Louis Climate Summit
