= Earth Overshoot Day =

Calculated calendar date when humanity's yearly consumption exceeds Earth's replenishment

The inward spiral shows how humans have progressively used more of Earth's resources than the planet can regenerate. Earth's ability to regenerate consumed resources now lasts only about 57% as long as in 1971.

Humans' overconsumption of Earth's resources has grown progressively over decades.

Earth Overshoot Day (EOD) is the calculated calendar date on which humanity's resource consumption for the year exceeds Earth's capacity to regenerate those resources that year. In 2026, it falls on July 30. The term "overshoot" represents the level by which human population's demand overshoots the sustainable amount of biological resources regenerated on Earth. When viewed through an economic perspective, the annual Earth Overshoot Day represents the day by which the planet's annual regenerative budget is spent, and humanity enters environmental deficit spending. Earth Overshoot Day is calculated by dividing the world biocapacity (the amount of natural resources regenerated by Earth that year), by the world ecological footprint (humanity's consumption of Earth's natural resources for that year), and multiplying by 365 (366 in leap years), the number of days in a year:

$$\frac{ \text{world biocapacity}}{\text{world ecological footprint}} \times 365 = \text{EOD}$$

Earth Overshoot Day is calculated by Global Footprint Network and is a campaign supported by dozens of other nonprofit organizations. Information about Global Footprint Network's calculations and national Ecological Footprints are available online.

== Background ==
Andrew Simms of UK think tank New Economics Foundation originally developed the concept of Earth Overshoot Day. Global Footprint Network, a partner organization of New Economics Foundation, launches a campaign every year for EOD to raise awareness of Earth's limited resources. Global Footprint Network measures humanity's demand for and supply of natural resources and ecological services. Global Footprint Network estimates for 2024 that in just about seven months, humanity demanded more from nature than the planet's ecosystems can regenerate in the entire year. Human demand includes all demands that compete for the regenerative capacity of the planet's surface, such as renewable resources, CO_{2} sequestration, and urban space.

According to Global Footprint Network, throughout most of history, humanity has used nature's resources to build cities and roads, to provide food and create products, and to release carbon dioxide at a rate that was well within Earth's budget. But by the early 1970s, that critical threshold had been crossed: Human consumption began outstripping what the planet could reproduce. According to their accounts, humanity's demand for resources is now equivalent to that of more than 1.7 Earths. The data shows us on track to require the resources of two planets well before mid-21st century. They state that the costs of resource depletion are becoming more evident. Climate change — a result of greenhouse gases being emitted — is the most obvious result and widespread effects. Other biophysical effects include: deforestation, species loss, soil erosion, or fisheries collapse. Such resource insecurity can lead to economic stress (such as monetary inflation) and conflict (such as civil unrest).

Global Footprint Network maintains that ecological footprint accounts document the gap between human demand and regeneration. According to them, demand is now exceeding what the planet renews. They recognize that the accounting can be improved, and more details added, believing that in its current applications to countries the accounts typically underestimate human demand as not all aspects are measured (there are gaps in UN data). They also claim to overestimate biocapacity because it is ambiguous to determine how much of current yields are enabled by reduced future yield (for instance as in the case of overuse of groundwater, or erosion). Mathis Wackernagel, founder and president of the Global Footprint Network, states that soil depletion on crop land could be included in the Ecological Footprint accounts informing EOD, but that would "require data sets that do not exist within the UN data set". Thus, they claim ecological footprint accounts are metrics that merely define minimal conditions for sustainability, and that human impact on the planet is likely higher than the results that their accounts reveal.

== History ==
In 2020 the calculated overshoot day fell on 22 August (more than three weeks later than 2019) due to coronavirus-induced lockdowns around the world. The president of the Global Footprint Network claims that the COVID-19 pandemic by itself is one of the manifestations of "ecological imbalance".

== Criticism ==
In 2017, the ecomodernist Breakthrough Institute dismissed the idea of Earth Overshoot Day by calling it "a nice publicity stunt". According to United Nations data, forests and fisheries are, as a whole, regenerating faster than they are depleted (but admitting that "the surplus might be more a reflection of poor UN fisheries data than healthy fisheries"), while cropland and pasture use is equal to what is available. Hence, EOD does a poor job at measuring water and land mismanagement (e.g., soil erosion) and only highlights the excess of carbon dioxide that humanity releases above what the ecosystem can absorb. In other words, the additional equivalent number of Earths that humanity requires is equivalent to a land area that, if filled with carbon sinks like forests, would balance carbon dioxide emissions. Researchers associated with Global Footprint Network answered these criticisms in a response in the same PLOS journal. More detailed discussions about criticism are available on Global Footprint Network website.

== See also ==
- Ecological footprint
- Ecological overshoot
- Equal Pay Day
- Overshoot (population)
  - Human overpopulation
- Tax Freedom Day
