= Ecological footprint =

Individual's or a group's human demand on nature

The ecological footprint measures human demand on natural capital, i.e. the quantity of nature it takes to support people and their economies. It tracks human demand on nature through an ecological accounting system. The accounts contrast the biologically productive area people use to satisfy their consumption to the biologically productive area available within a region, nation, or the world (biocapacity). Biocapacity is the productive area that can regenerate what people demand from nature. Therefore, the metric is a measure of human impact on the environment. As Ecological Footprint accounts measure to what extent human activities operate within the means of our planet, they are a central metric for sustainability.

The metric is promoted by the Global Footprint Network which has developed standards to make results comparable. FoDaFo, supported by Global Footprint Network and York University are now providing the national assessments of Footprints and biocapacity.

Footprint and biocapacity can be compared at the individual, regional, national or global scale. Both footprint and demands on biocapacity change every year with number of people, per person consumption, efficiency of production, and productivity of ecosystems. At a global scale, footprint assessments show how big humanity's demand is compared to what Earth can renew. Global Footprint Network estimates that, as of 2022, humanity has been using natural capital 71% faster than Earth can renew it, which they describe as meaning humanity's ecological footprint corresponds to 1.71 planet Earths. This overuse is called ecological overshoot.

Ecological footprint analysis is widely used around the world in support of sustainability assessments. It enables people to measure and manage the use of resources throughout the economy and explore the sustainability of individual lifestyles, goods and services, organizations, industry sectors, neighborhoods, cities, regions, and nations.

== Overview ==
The ecological footprint concept and calculation method was developed as the PhD dissertation of Mathis Wackernagel, in collaboration with his supervisor William Rees at the University of British Columbia in Vancouver, Canada, from 1990 to 1994. The first academic publication about ecological footprints was written by William Rees in 1992. Originally, Wackernagel and Rees called the concept "appropriated carrying capacity". To make the idea more accessible, Rees came up with the term "ecological footprint", inspired by a computer technician who praised his new computer's "small footprint on the desk". In 1996, Wackernagel and Rees published the book Our Ecological Footprint: Reducing Human Impact on the Earth.

The simplest way to define an ecological footprint is the amount of environmental resources necessary to produce the goods and services that support an individual's lifestyle, a nation's prosperity, or the economic activity of humanity as a whole.

The model is a means of comparing lifestyles, per capita consumption, and population numbers, and checking these against biocapacity. The tool can inform policy by examining to what extent a nation uses more (or less) than is available within its territory, or to what extent the nation's lifestyle and population density would be replicable worldwide. The footprint can be a useful tool to educate people about overconsumption and overpopulation, with the aim of altering personal behavior or public policies. Ecological footprints may be used to argue that current lifestyles and human numbers are not sustainable. Country-by-country comparisons show the inequalities of resource use on this planet.

The touristic ecological footprint (TEF) is the ecological footprint of visitors to a particular destination, and depends on the tourists' behavior. Comparisons of TEFs can indicate the benefits of alternative destinations, modes of travel, food choices, types of lodging, and activities.

The carbon footprint is a component of the total ecological footprint. Often, when only the carbon footprint is reported, it is expressed in weight of CO_{2} (or CO2e representing GHG warming potential (GGWP)), but it can also be expressed in land areas like ecological footprints. Both can be applied to products, people, or whole societies.

From Mathis Wackernagel, it is generally probably true that the lower the ecological footprint, the greater the ecological resilience.

== Methodology ==
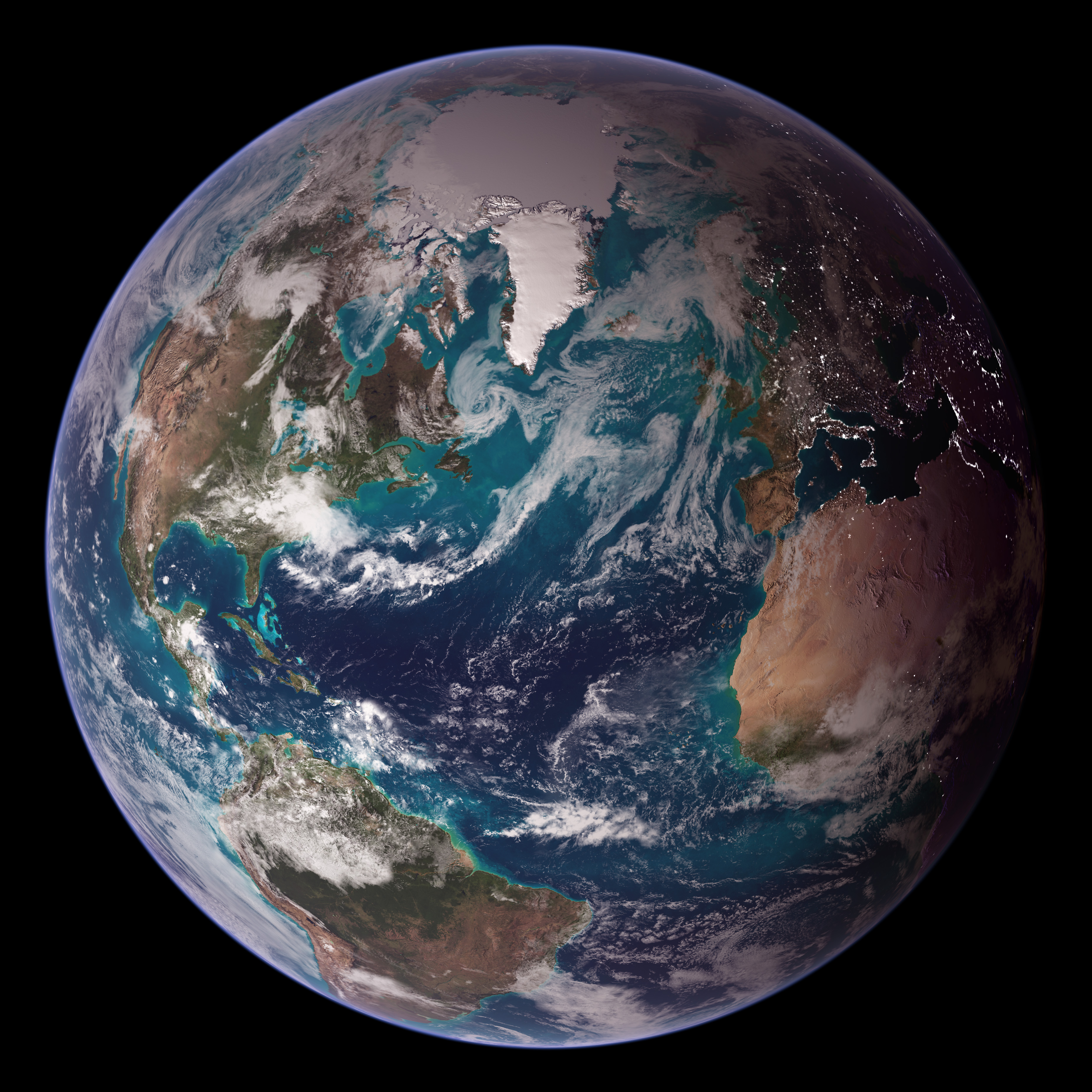
The natural resources of Earth are finite, and are being used unsustainably given current levels of use.

Ecological footprint accounting is built on the recognition that regenerative resources are the physically most limiting resources of all. Even fossil fuel use is far more limited by the amount of sequestration the biosphere can provide rather than by the amounts left underground. The same is true for ores and minerals, where the limiting factor is how much damage to the biosphere we are willing to accept to extract and concentrate those materials, rather than by how much of them is still left underground. Therefore, the focus of ecological footprint accounting is human competition for regenerative resources.

The amount of the planet's regeneration, including how many resources are renewed and how much waste the planet can absorb, is dubbed biocapacity. Ecological footprints therefore track how much biocapacity is needed to provide for all the inputs that human activities demand. It can be calculated at any scale: for an activity, a person, a community, a city, a region, a nation, or humanity as a whole.

Footprints can be split into consumption categories: food, housing, and goods and services. Or it can be organized by area types occupied: cropland, pasture, forests for forest products, forests for carbon sequestration, marine areas, etc.

When this approach is applied to an activity such as the manufacturing of a product or driving a car, it uses data from life-cycle analysis. Such applications translate the consumption of energy, biomass (food, fiber), building material, water and other resources into normalized land areas called global hectares (gha) needed to provide these inputs.

Since the Global Footprint Network's inception in 2003, it has calculated the ecological footprint from UN data sources for the world as a whole and for over 200 nations (known as the National Footprint and Biocapacity Accounts). This task has now been taken over by FoDaFo and York University. The total footprint number of Earths needed to sustain the world's population at that level of consumption are also calculated. Every year the calculations are updated to the latest year with complete UN statistics. The time series are also recalculated with every update, since UN statistics sometimes correct historical data sets. Results are available on an open data platform.

Lin et al. (2018) find that the trends for countries and the world have stayed consistent despite data updates. In addition, a recent study by the Swiss Ministry of Environment independently recalculated the Swiss trends and reproduced them within 1–4% for the time period that they studied (1996–2015). Since 2006, a first set of ecological footprint standards exist that detail both communication and calculation procedures. The latest version are the updated standards from 2009.

The ecological footprint accounting method at the national level is described on the website of the Global Footprint Network or in greater detail in academic papers, including Borucke et al.

The National Accounts Review Committee has published a research agenda on how to improve the accounts.

== Footprint measurements ==
For 2023 Global Footprint Network estimated humanity's ecological footprint as 1.71 planet Earths. According to their calculations this means that humanity's demands were 1.71 times more than what the planet's ecosystems renewed.

If this rate of resource use is not reduced, persistent overshoot would suggest the occurrence of continued ecological deterioration and a potentially permanent decrease in Earth's human carrying capacity.

In 2022, the average biologically productive area per person worldwide was approximately 1.6 global hectares (gha) per capita. The U.S. footprint per person was 7.5 gha, and that of Switzerland was 3.7 gha, that of China 3.6 gha, and that of India 1.0 gha. In its Living Planet Report 2022, the WWF documents a 69% decline in the world's vertebrate populations between 1970 and the present, and links this decline to humanity greatly exceeding global biocapacity. Wackernagel and Rees originally estimated that the available biological capacity for the 6 billion people on Earth at that time was about 1.3 hectares per person, which is smaller than the 1.6 global hectares published for 2024, because the initial studies neither used global hectares nor included bioproductive marine areas.

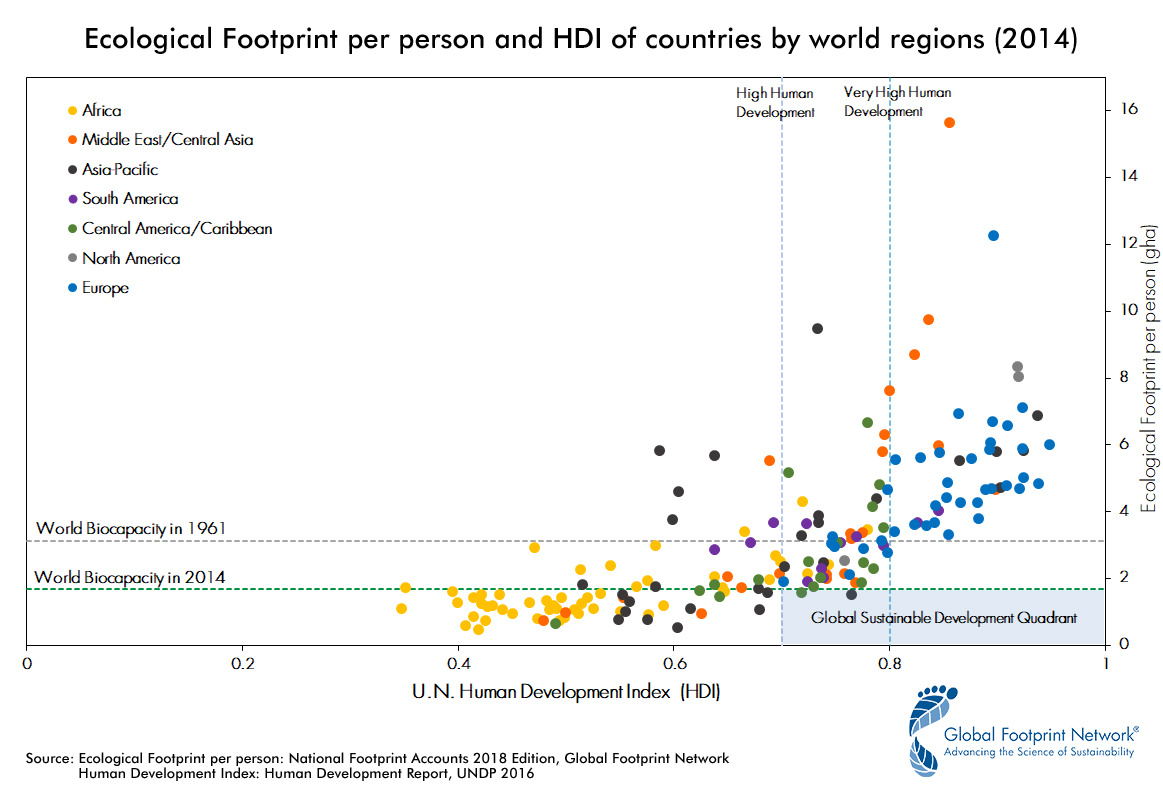
Ecological Footprint per person and HDI of countries by world regions (2014) and its natural resource consumption.

According to the 2018 edition of the National footprint accounts, humanity's total ecological footprint has exhibited an increasing trend since 1961, growing an average of 2.1% per year (SD= 1.9). Humanity's ecological footprint was 7.0 billion gha in 1961 and increased to 20.6 billion gha in 2014, a function of higher per capita resource use and population increase. The world-average ecological footprint in 2014 was 2.8 global hectares per person. The carbon footprint is the fastest growing part of the ecological footprint and accounts currently for about 60% of humanity's total ecological footprint.

The Earth's biocapacity has not increased at the same rate as the ecological footprint. The increase of biocapacity averaged at only 0.5% per year (SD = 0.7). Because of agricultural intensification, biocapacity was at 9.6 billion gha in 1961 and grew to 12.2 billion gha in 2016.

However, this increased biocapacity for people came at the expense of other species. Agricultural intensification involved increased fertilizer use which led to eutrophication of streams and ponds; increased pesticide use which decimated pollinator populations; increased water withdrawals which decreased river health; and decreased land left wild or fallow which decreased wildlife populations on agricultural lands. This reminds us that ecological footprint calculations are anthropocentric, assuming that all Earth's biocapacity is legitimately available to human beings. If we assume that some biocapacity should be left for other species, the level of ecological overshoot increases.

Humans' overconsumption of Earth's resources has grown progressively over decades.

According to Wackernagel and the organisation he has founded, the Earth has been in "overshoot", where humanity is using more resources and generating waste at a pace that the ecosystem cannot renew, since the 1970s. According to the Global Footprint Network's calculations, currently people use Earth's resources at approximately 171% of capacity. This implies that humanity is well over Earth's human carrying capacity at current levels of affluence. In 2025, Earth Overshoot Day advanced to 24 July. Earth Overshoot Day marks the date when humanity has exhausted nature's budget for the year. For the rest of the year, we are maintaining our ecological deficit by drawing down local resource stocks and accumulating carbon dioxide in the atmosphere.

Currently, more than 85% of humanity lives in countries that run an ecological deficit. This means their citizens use more resources and generate more waste and pollution than can be sustained by the biocapacity found within their national boundaries. In some cases, countries are running an ecological deficit because their per capita ecological footprints are higher than the hectares of bioproductive land available on average globally (this was estimated at <1.7 hectares per person in 2019). Examples include France, Germany and Saudi Arabia. In other cases, per capita resource use may be lower than the global available average, but countries are running an ecological deficit because their populations are high enough that they still use more bioproductive land than they have within their national borders. Examples include China, India and the Philippines. Finally, many countries run an ecological deficit because of both high per capita resource use and large populations; such countries tend to be way over their national available biocapacities. Examples include Japan, the United Kingdom and the United States.

According to William Rees, writing in 2011, "the average world citizen has an eco-footprint of about 2.7 global average hectares while there are only 2.1 global hectare of bioproductive land and water per capita on earth. This means that humanity has already overshot global biocapacity by 30% and now lives unsustainabily by depleting stocks of 'natural capital'."

Since then, due to population growth and further refinements in the calculations, available biocapacity per person has decreased to <1.7 hectares per person globally. More recently, Rees has written:

The human enterprise is in potentially disastrous 'overshoot', exploiting the ecosphere beyond ecosystems' regenerative capacity and filling natural waste sinks to overflowing. Economic behavior that was once 'rational' has become maladaptive. This situation is the inevitable outcome of humanity's natural expansionist tendencies reinforced by ecologically vacuous growth-oriented 'neoliberal' economic theory.

Rees now believes that economic and demographic degrowth are necessary to create societies with small enough ecological footprints to remain sustainable and avoid civilizational collapse.

== Footprint by country ==
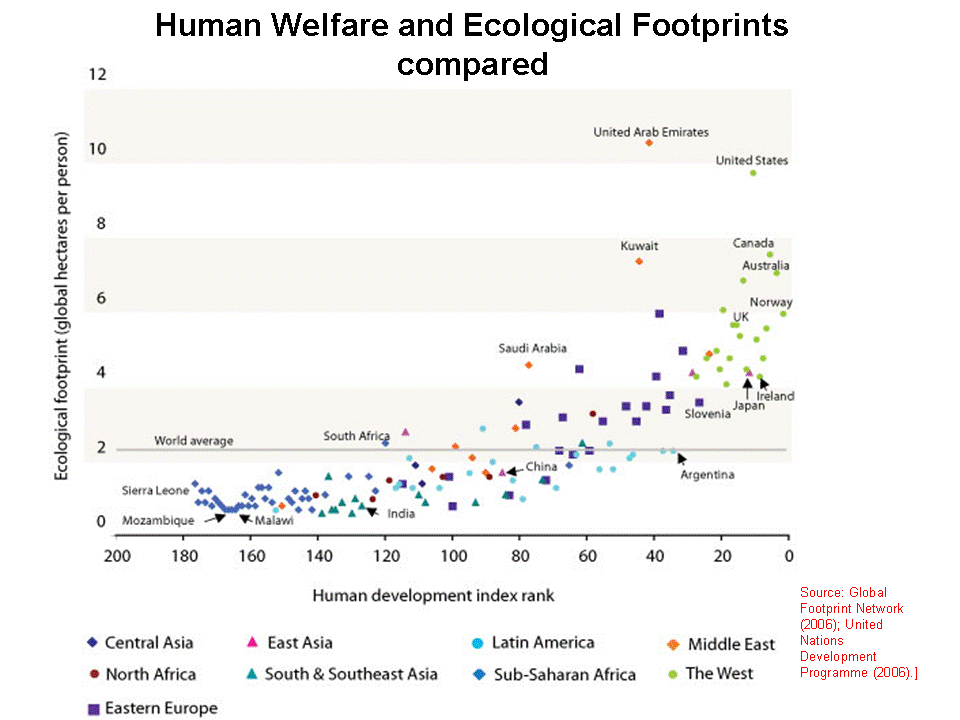
Ecological footprint for different nations compared to their Human Development Index (2007)

The world-average ecological footprint in 2013 was 2.8 global hectares per person. The average per country ranges from 14.3 (Qatar) to 0.5 (Yemen) global hectares per person. There is also a high variation within countries, based on individual lifestyles and wealth.

In 2022, countries with the top ten per capita ecological footprints were: Qatar (14.3 global hectares), Luxembourg (13.0), Cook Islands (8.3), Bahrain (8.2), United States (8.1), United Arab Emirates (8.1), Canada (8.1), Estonia (8.0), Kuwait (7.9) and Belize (7.9).

Total ecological footprint for a nation is found by multiplying its per capita ecological footprint by its total population. Total ecological footprint ranges from 5,540,000,000 global hectares used (China) to 145,000 (Cook Islands) global hectares used. In 2022, the top ten countries in total ecological footprint were: China (5.54 billion global hectares), United States (2.66 billion), India (1.64 billion), Russian Federation (774 million), Japan (586 million), Brazil (542 million), Indonesia (460 million), Germany (388 million), Republic of Korea (323 million) and Mexico (301 million). These were the ten nations putting the greatest strain on global ecosystem services.

The Western Australian government State of the Environment Report included an Ecological Footprint measure for the average Western Australian seven times the average footprint per person on the planet in 2007, a total of about 15 hectares.

The figure (right) examines sustainability at the scale of individual countries by contrasting their Ecological Footprint with their UN Human Development Index (a measure of standard of living). The graph shows what is necessary for countries to maintain an acceptable standard of living for their citizens while, at the same time, maintaining sustainable resource use. The general trend is for higher standards of living to become less sustainable. As always, population growth has a marked influence on total consumption and production, with larger populations becoming less sustainable. Most countries around the world continue to become more populous, although a few seem to have stabilized or are even beginning to shrink. The information generated by reports at the national, regional and city scales confirm the global trend towards societies becoming less sustainable over time.

=== Studies in the United Kingdom ===
The UK's average ecological footprint is 5.45 global hectares per capita (gha) with variations between regions ranging from 4.80 gha (Wales) to 5.56 gha (East England).

BedZED, a 96-home mixed-income housing development in South London, was designed by Bill Dunster Architects and sustainability consultants BioRegional for the Peabody Trust. Despite being populated by relatively average people, BedZED was found to have a footprint of 3.20 gha per capita (not including visitors), due to on-site renewable energy production, energy-efficient architecture, and an extensive green lifestyles program that included London's first carsharing club. Findhorn Ecovillage, a rural intentional community in Moray, Scotland, had a total footprint of 2.56 gha per capita, including both the many guests and visitors who travel to the community. However, the residents alone had a footprint of 2.71 gha, a little over half the UK national average and one of the lowest ecological footprints of any community measured so far in the industrialized world. Keveral Farm, an organic farming community in Cornwall, was found to have a footprint of 2.4 gha, though with substantial differences in footprints among community members.

== Ecological footprint at the individual level ==
In a 2012 study of consumers acting 'green' vs. 'brown' (where green people are "expected to have significantly lower ecological impact than 'brown' consumers"), "the research found no significant difference between the carbon footprints of green and brown consumers". A 2013 study concluded the same.

== Reviews and critiques ==
Early criticism was published by van den Bergh and Verbruggen in 1999, which was updated in 2014. Their colleague Fiala published similar criticism in 2008.

A comprehensive review commissioned by the Directorate-General for the Environment (European Commission) was published in June 2008. The European Commission's review found the concept unique and useful for assessing progress on the EU's Resource Strategy. They also recommended further improvements in data quality, methodologies and assumptions.

Blomqvist et al.. published a critical paper in 2013. It led to a reply from Rees and Wackernagel (2013), and a rejoinder by Blomqvist et al. (2013).

An additional strand of critique is from Giampietro and Saltelli (2014), with a reply from Goldfinger et al., 2014, and a rejoinder by Giampietro and Saltelli (2014). A joint paper authored by the critical researchers (Giampietro and Saltelli) and proponents (various Global Footprint Network researchers) summarized the terms of the controversy in a paper published by the journal Ecological Indicators. Additional comments were offered by van den Bergh and Grazi (2015).

A number of national government agencies have performed collaborative or independent research to test the reliability of the ecological footprint accounting method and its results. They have largely confirmed the accounts' results; those who reproduced the assessment generating near-identical results. Such reviews include those of Switzerland, Germany, France, Ireland, the United Arab Emirates and the European Commission.

Global Footprint Network has summarized methodological limitations and criticism in a comprehensive report available on its website.

Similarly, Newman (2006) has argued that the ecological footprint concept may have an anti-urban bias, as it does not consider the opportunities created by urban growth. He argues that calculating the ecological footprint for densely populated areas, such as a city or small country with a comparatively large population—e.g. New York and Singapore respectively—may lead to the perception of these populations as "parasitic". But in reality, ecological footprints just document the resource dependence of cities on rural hinterlands. Critics argue that this is a dubious characterization, since farmers in developed nations may easily consume more resources than urban inhabitants, due to transportation requirements and the unavailability of economies of scale. Furthermore, such moral conclusions seem to be an argument for autarky. But this is similar to blaming a scale for the user's dietary choices. Even if true, such criticisms do not negate the value of measuring different cities', regions', or nations' ecological footprints and comparing them. Such assessments can provide helpful insights into the success or failure of different environmental policies.

Since this metric tracks biocapacity, the replacement of original ecosystems with high-productivity agricultural monocultures can lead to attributing a higher biocapacity to such regions. For example, replacing ancient woodlands or tropical forests with monoculture forests or plantations may therefore decrease the ecological footprint. Similarly if organic farming yields were lower than those of conventional methods, this could result in the former being "penalized" with a larger ecological footprint. Complementary biodiversity indicators attempt to address this. The WWF's Living Planet Report combines the footprint calculations with the Living Planet Index of biodiversity. A modified ecological footprint that takes biodiversity into account has been created for use in Australia.

Ecological footprint for many years has been used by environmentalists as a way to quantify ecological degradation as it relates to an individual. Recently, there has been debate about the reliability of this method.

== See also ==
- Biocapacity
- Carbon footprint
- Carrying capacity
- Dependency theory
- Earth Overshoot Day formerly also called Ecological Debt Day
- Ecological economics
- Ecosystem valuation
- Environmental impact assessment
- Greenhouse debt
- Greenhouse gas emissions accounting
- Happy Planet Index
- Human Footprint
- Life cycle assessment
- List of countries by ecological footprint
- Netherlands fallacy
- Our Common Future
- Overshoot (population)
- Physical balance of trade
- Simon–Ehrlich wager
- Social metabolism
- The Limits to Growth
- Water footprint
- Artificialization
