= World Resources Forum =

Non-profit organisation

World Resources Forum (WRF)
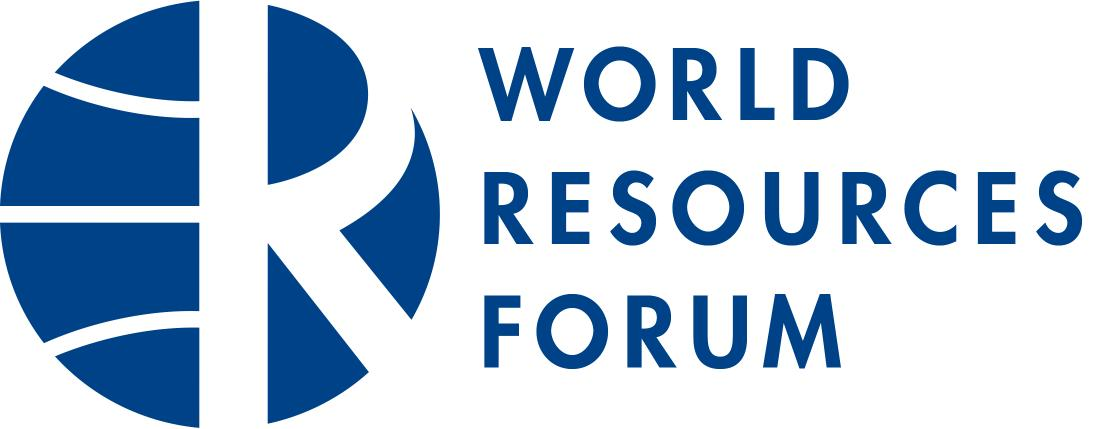
- Founded: 16 March 2012; 14 years ago
- Founder: Xaver Edelmann
- Type: Nonprofit organisation
- Purpose: Resource efficiency, circular economy
- Location: St.Gallen, Switzerland
- Key people: Bruno Oberle (President); Mathias Schluep (Managing Director); Sonia Valdivia (Scientific Director)
- Employees: 10-50
- Website: www.wrforum.org

The World Resources Forum (WRF) is a non-profit organisation for sharing knowledge about the economic, political, social and environmental implications of global resource use. WRF promotes resource productivity among researchers, policymakers, business, NGOs and the public. In addition to organizing international and regional conferences, the WRF Secretariat coordinates multistakeholder dialogue projects, amongst others such as the Sustainable Recycling Initiative (SRI) as well as the H2020 projects Towards a World Forum on Raw Materials (FORAM), and CEWASTE. The WRF contributes to other EC-projects (like CICERONE and RE:SOURCE) and projects with the German development organisation GiZ, UNEP and UNIDO.

WRF serves as a platform fostering knowledge exchange between academics, politicians, research-oriented practitioners, entrepreneurs, consultants and other professionals in the areas of the Sustainable Development Goals (SDGs) (sustainable development.)

== Overview ==
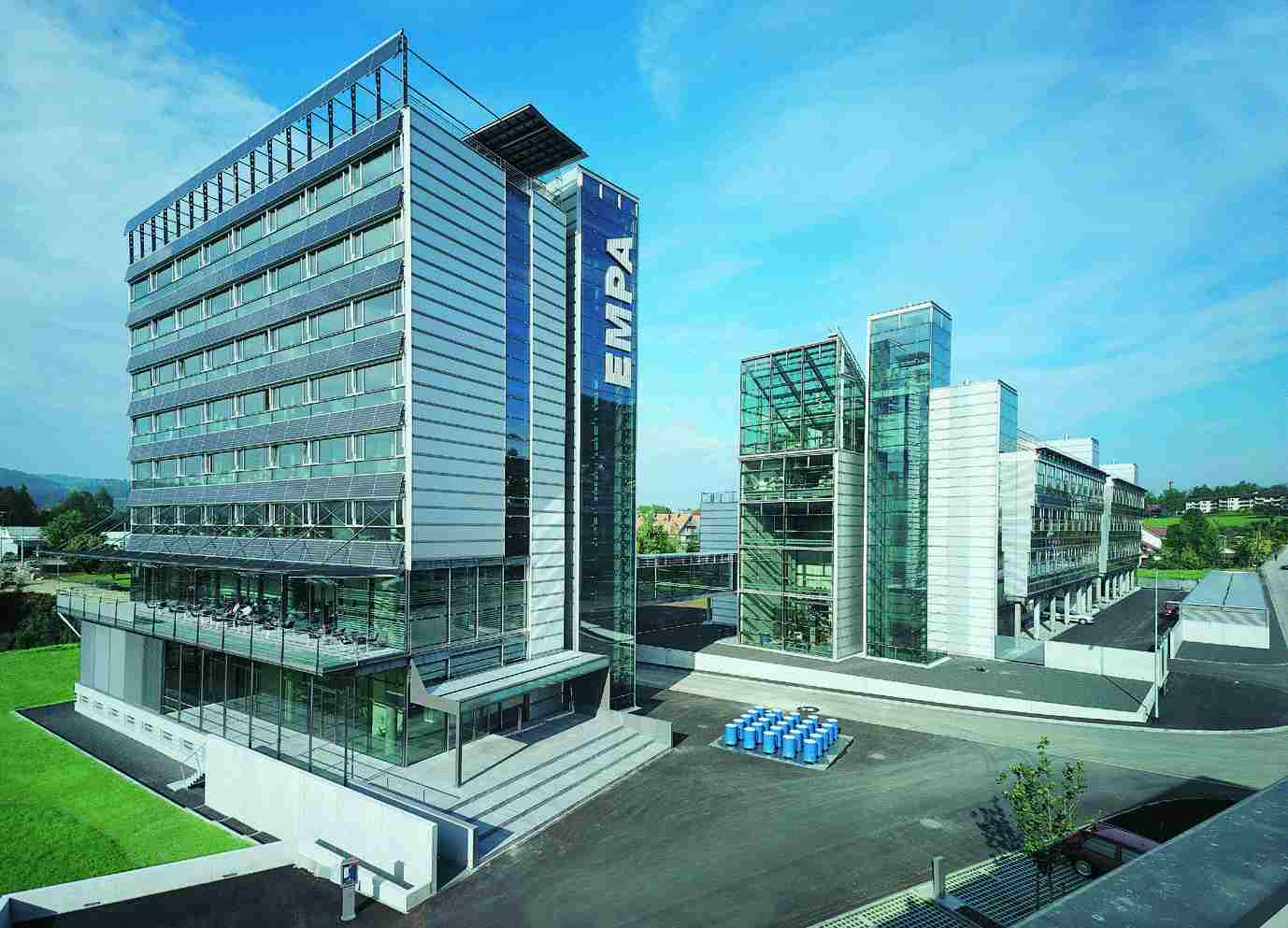
WRF Headquarters at Empa in St. Gallen, Switzerland

The WRF aims to bring the issues of global resource consumption and resource productivity higher on the agenda of policymakers and business leaders. Aspects covered by the WRF include the scarcity and security of supply as well as the price risks of key resources. The issues of pollution and energy use over the life-cycle of certain resources, their social impact – in particular in developing countries – and in general the Sustainable Development Goals (SDGs) are topics examined by the WRF as well.

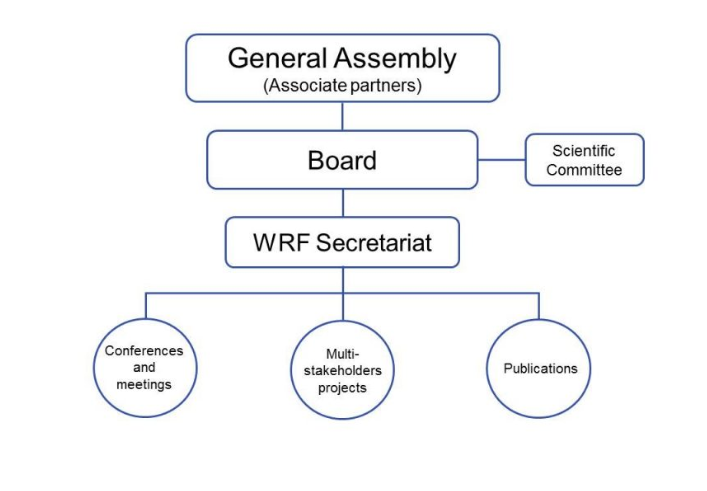
Organisational structure of the World Resources Forum

As an inter-link between research, industry and policymaking, WRF emphasises the facilitation of networking in order to optimise the transfer of knowledge between the different stakeholders. For that purpose, special events are organised and connections to key leaders can be established through the WRF Secretariat.

The WRF's capacity-building activities include, for instance, supporting the participation of scientists from developing countries and of young people (for example the youth programme of the 2011 WRF Conference) and Kids and yWRF program of WRF 2013.

The main event is the organisation of the annual WRF Conference, which usually takes place in the fall and brings together science, research, policymakers, and industry. The programme usually includes a series of high-level keynotes, parallel sessions and targeted workshops as well as special side events. Apart from that, regular media reports are regularly written by Student Reporters. Furthermore, the WRF Secretariat conducts other knowledge and multi-stakeholder dialogue as well, such as the dissemination of UN Environment International Resource Panel reports though website, social media and MOOCs.

The Corporate image of the World Resources Forum was designed by Helmut Langer. It shows a white R in a blue world which symbolizes not only the resource issue but also associations like Refusing, Reducing, Re-using, Repairing, Refurbishing, Remanufacturing, Re-purposing, Recycling and Recovering.

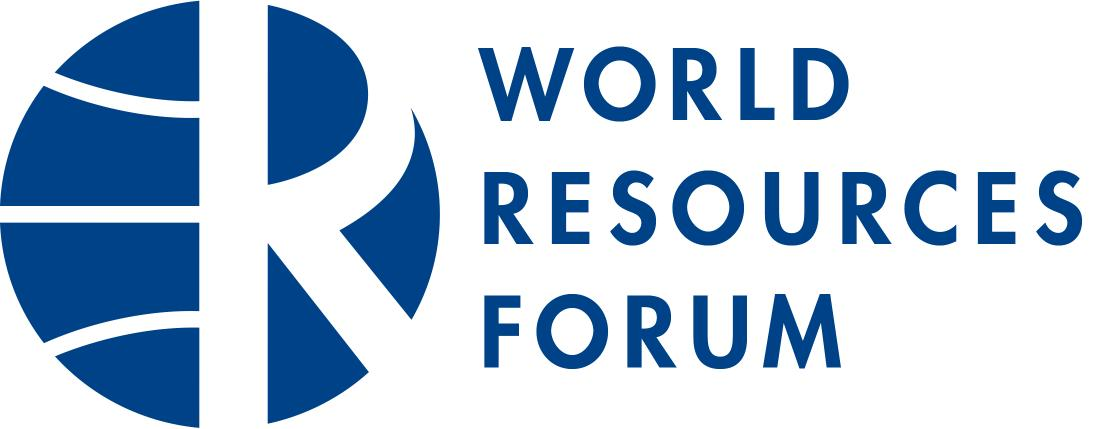
Logo of the World Resources Forum as of 2015

=== Organisational structure ===
The WRF is a not-for-profit association, with a General Assembly and Board. The WRF Secretariat, based in St. Gallen, Switzerland, is responsible for the coordination and organisation of multiple activities.

Founding members are the Swiss Federal Office for the Environment, the Swiss interdisciplinary research institution and service provider for materials science and technology Empa, the United Nations Environment International Resource Panel, Hewlett-Packard, and the city of St. Gallen.

Other members have included the German Federal Environment Agency, the Dutch Ministry of Infrastructure and Environment, the United Nations Industrial Development Organisation, the Swiss Academies of Arts and Sciences, the Rhomberg Group, the Global e-Sustainability Initiative (GeSI), the Mercator Foundation Switzerland, the Association for Quality and Management Systems (SQS), the Chinese Academy of Sciences, the Foundation for Rare Metals ESM, the Swiss Academy of Engineering Sciences (SATW) and the Finnish Innovation Fund SITRA.

=== History ===
The Swiss Federal Laboratories for Materials Science and Technology, Empa, part of the ETH Domain, has organised international conferences on recycling and re-use of resources since 1995, the so-called "R"series (R'93, R'95 etc). R referred to reduce, reuse and recycle. In 2009 Empa together with the Factor 10 Institute decided to broaden the scope of the conferences to include the full life-cycle of products and services. And so the series of conferences became the World Resources Forum, which has been attracting high-level politicians, business leaders, NGOs and scientists from all over the world ever since.

In 2009 the WRF Conference was organised in Davos, Switzerland, back to back with the R'09 Twin World Congress on Resource Management and Technology for Material and Energy Efficiency.

The R' Conferences got entirely integrated into the WRF and in 2011 the enlarged WRF Conference took place again in Davos, followed by annual flagship meetings in Switzerland and beyond.

The spin-off of the Secretariat from Empa and inauguration of the independent WRF Association took place on 16 March 2012 in St. Gallen, Switzerland, with support from governmental and non-governmental organizations, as well as the private sector. Bas de Leeuw (former UN Environment) became its first Managing Director, and Xaver Edelmann (former Empa) its first President. Former FOEN (Federal Office for the Environment) Director Bruno Oberle was elected President in 2018, Xaver Edelmann stayed on as Vice-President.

== Conferences ==
Flagship activity of the World Resources Forum is the organisation of the annual WRF Conference, which brings together science, research, policymakers and industry. The programme includes a series of high-level keynotes, parallel sessions and targeted workshops as well as special side events. The program normally also include WRF Cinema, WRF Art Gallery, WRF Workshop Parade and WRF Gala Dinner. The Workshop Parade format was shortlisted for the Audience Interaction Award by the Meeting Design Institute at the multi-hub FRESH 2018 conference. The World Resources Forum Secretariat also organizes regional conferences such as the Asia-Pacific Resources Forum, and the Latin America and the Caribbean Resources Forum, and it contributes to the bi-annual European Resources Forum, held in Berlin, organised by the German Federal Environment Agency UBA. In 2016 the first Swiss Resources Forum, focusing on resources issues within Switzerland, was organised in the NEST, Empa's Innovation Hub in Dubendorf, Zurich.

=== WRF 2020 ===
WRF 2020 was scheduled to be held in Accra, Ghana, in June 2020, so announced the Minister of Environment, Science, Technology, and Innovation of Ghana, H.E. Kwabena Frimpong-Boateng, in the closing session of WRF 2019. In response to the COVID-19 pandemic the conference was rescheduled to 2021.

=== WRF 2019 ===
WRF 2019 on Resource Governance was held in Geneva, October 23–24, 2019, at the Centre International de Conférences Genève. The conference attracted over 300 participants coming from some 50 countries and international organisations. Participants called for ambitious international rules for mineral resources management. A low-carbon and resource efficient economy requires an uptake in technologies such as electric vehicles, renewable energy, and digitalization. Without improved governance it will be impossible to ensure proper provision of the resources needed. The chair summary was published in November 2019.

=== WRF19 Antwerp ===
WRF19 on Closing Loops was held in Antwerp, Belgium, on 24–27 February 2019, at the Flanders Meeting & Convention Center, co-organised with OVAM, the Public Waste Agency of Flanders. The conference attracted some 750 participants from 70 countries. Her Majesty the Queen of Belgium visited the opening session in her capacity as Advocate of the UN Sustainable Development Goals. The conference was originally planned to take place in Autumn 2018. The meeting report was published in October 2019.

=== Swiss Resources Forum 2018 ===
The Swiss Resources Forum 2018 was organised 25 October in Dubendorf, near Zurich, as an initiative of a broad group of organizations, including the WRF, the Swiss Federal Office for the Environment FOEN, Empa, the Swiss Academies of Art and Sciences a+, ecos, engageability, the "Entwicklungsfonds Seltene Metalle" ESM Foundation, the Swiss Network of Mineral Resources NEROS, NFP 73, the Swiss Network for Sustainable Management Öbu, Reffnet.ch, the Swiss Academy of Engineering Sciences SATW, and the Swiss Association for Quality and Management Systems SQS. A "Raw Materials Market" enabled visitors to discover through an interactive poster exhibition the diversity of Swiss initiatives and networks on resource efficiency in Switzerland that already exist today and are working towards a more resource efficient society. By visiting the NEST Urban Mining and Recycling (UMAR) Unit, the participants had the opportunity to learn more about innovative solutions in the building sector.

=== WRF 2017 ===
This conference took place in Geneva on 24–26 October 2017 at the Centre International de Conférences Genève. WRF 2017 has focused on Accelerating the Resource Revolution and the over 400 participants from 48 countries discussed topics such as the Governance of Raw Materials, Circular Economy and Sustainable Recycling, the Sustainable Development Goals, Business Concepts on Resource Efficiency and Decoupling, Sustainable Consumption and Production, Life Cycle Thinking, Smart Cities, Infrastructure and Lifestyles and Capacity Building for Resource Efficiency. Keynote speakers have included, amongst others, Mathis Wackernagel, Jørgen Randers, Anders Wijkman and Janez Potočnik. The meeting report was published in 2018.

=== World Circular Economy Forum 2017 ===
Together with the Finnish Innovation Fund SITRA, World Resources Forum has co-organized the World Circular Economy Forum (WCEF) in June 2017 with the Nordic Council of Ministers, the Ellen Macarthur Foundation, the Finnish government, the European Commission, the European Environment Agency, International Institute for Sustainable Development, UN Environment and WBCSD. The forum has focused on showcasing circular economy solutions for business, cities and finance and attracted 1500 participants from 105 countries. Overall conclusion of the WCEF was that the business case for Circular Economy does not have to be made, but that many countries and businesses are already leading the way.

=== Swiss Resources Forum 2016 ===
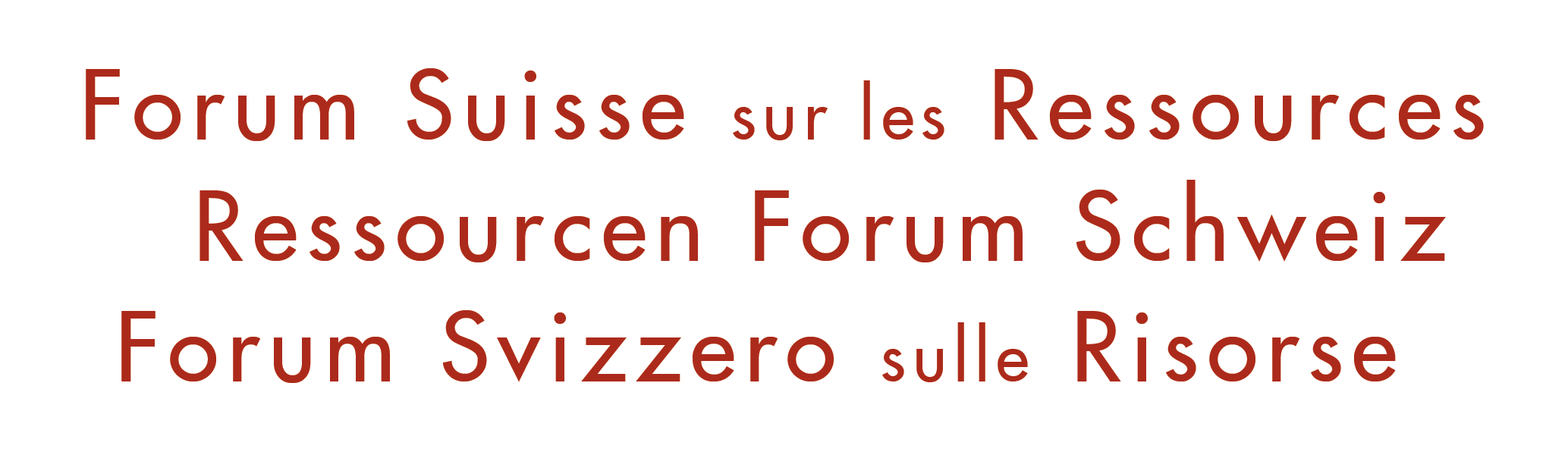
Logo of the Swiss Resources Forum

The WRF organized together with other stakeholders a resource forum focusing on Switzerland. The conference brought together over 100 participants from industry as well as policymakers and researchers. It focused on the supply of critical metals and other resources needed for renewable energy and energy-efficient technologies, innovation and economic growth. The main outcome stated that Switzerland not only needs an Energy Revolution (away from fossil fuels) but also a Resource Revolution.

=== WRF LAC 2016 ===
The World Resources Forum Latin America and the Caribbean was held in San José, Costa Rica in conjunction with the International Sustainable Building Congress, organised by the Green Building Council Costa Rica, WRF and UNEP. About 380 participants from 30 countries focused on the key topics of sustainable business and financing; bio economy – priority resources for cities; sustainable lifestyles and education; resource efficiency policies for sustainable cities and lifestyles; sustainable and inclusive cities and buildings. The meeting report was published in 2016.

=== WRF 2015 ===
World Resources Forum 2015 was held in Davos, Switzerland, from 11–14 October 2015, and had over 600 participants coming from 108 countries. Discussed topics included Circular Economy and Decoupling; technological innovation, business and finance; targets, indicators, and benchmarks for resource use as well as lifestyles and education. One of the main outcomes of the conference was that there is a strong need for reliable and comprehensive indicators and benchmarks that could produce meaningful data to set targets and goals for policymakers in the field of resource management. The meeting report was published in 2015.

=== WRF Asia-Pacific 2015 ===
World Resources Forum Asia-Pacific was held in Sydney, Australia, from 1–3 June 2015, and attracted close to 300 participants. An Action Agenda on Resource Productivity and Innovation was launched by the Institute for Sustainable Futures of the University of Technology (UTS) and the Centre for Sustainable Materials Research and Technology at UNSW Australia. The chairman's summary was published in 2015. Key themes discussed during the conference were Resource Productivity in the Asia‐Pacific, Enabling Transition Pathways and Innovation through Collaboration.

=== WRF 2014 ===
World Resources Forum 2014 was held in Arequipa, Peru, from 19–22 October 2014 and attracted over 1,000 participants coming from 40 countries and international organisations. Main topics of the conference included issues such as increasing resource productivity, fighting climate change, decreasing the environmental and social burden of current consumption and production patterns, and achieving a high quality of life for the current and future generations. The meeting report was published in 2015.

=== WRF 2013 ===
World Resources Forum 2013 was held in Davos, Switzerland, 6–9 October 2013 and attracted over 400 participants from 53 countries and international organisations. Main conference topics at WRF 2013 were Resource Efficiency and Governance, Sustainable Business and Industry, Sustainable Cities and Infrastructure, and Lifestyles and Education. The conference included plenary speeches by leading experts such as Ernst Ulrich von Weizsäcker, as well as debates featuring Gerben-Jan Gerbrandy, Reinhard Bütikofer and H.R.H. Prince Jaime of Bourbon-Parma. The meeting report was published in 2013. A video with conference highlights was published by UBrainTV.

=== WRF 2012 ===
World Resources Forum 2012 was held from 21–23 October at the China National Convention Center in Beijing, China, and attracted over 700 participants. Main theme of this forum, co-organised with the Chinese Academy of Sciences, was Resources and Green Economy. The outcome of the conference stated that scarcity of resources, increasing prices, and unsustainable use of resources do hinder economic development and therefore pose risks for global stability. The meeting report was published in 2012.

=== WRF 2011 ===
More than 400 participants from over 40 countries and international organisations attended the World Resources Forum 2011 in Davos, Switzerland, from 19–21 September 2011. The results from the conference were documented in a meeting report and were submitted to the Rio+20 Earth Summit's compilation document, as well as other stakeholders, such as the International Monetary Fund. The Swiss government adopted the recommendations and integrated these in their statements in Rio. Topics discussed at the conference included the Security of Supply; Assessment Methods, Resource Use Indicators and Targets; the Social Dimension of Resources as well as communication and education. The meeting report was published in 2011.

=== WRF 2009 ===
The R'09 conference on resource management and technology for material and energy efficiency was run simultaneously in Davos and Nagoya from 14 to 16 September 2009. The main goal of the ninth event in the R' World Congress series was to promote technologies and frameworks for enhancing the material and energy efficiency of products, services and processes (from production and use to recycling), including developing sustainable solutions for tackling the growing mountain of e-waste. The conference was organized by Empa in cooperation with the Swiss Academy of Engineering Sciences, the EcoTopia Science Institute of the University of Nagoya, and the Factor 10 Institute. For the first time, that year's conference was followed by the World Resources Forum, where politicians and scientists had the opportunity to discuss new economic frameworks promoting the sustainable use of resources. The innovative two site conference concept saved considerable amounts of CO_{2}, so the conclusion of a scientific paper, published in Elsevier's Telematics and Informatics Journal.

At the Davos meeting, WRF attendees adopted a declaration that calls for western economies to massively reduce their material inputs and for the world to dramatically increase resource productivity. They also agreed that, because the price of natural resources is low compared to that of labour, industry will not purposely drive those changes. Only governments can provide the necessary framework and incentives.

== Key projects ==
The World Resources Forum Secretariat coordinates and has the project lead for various programs. They range from development cooperation projects to more governance oriented initiatives.

=== Sustainable Recycling Industries ===
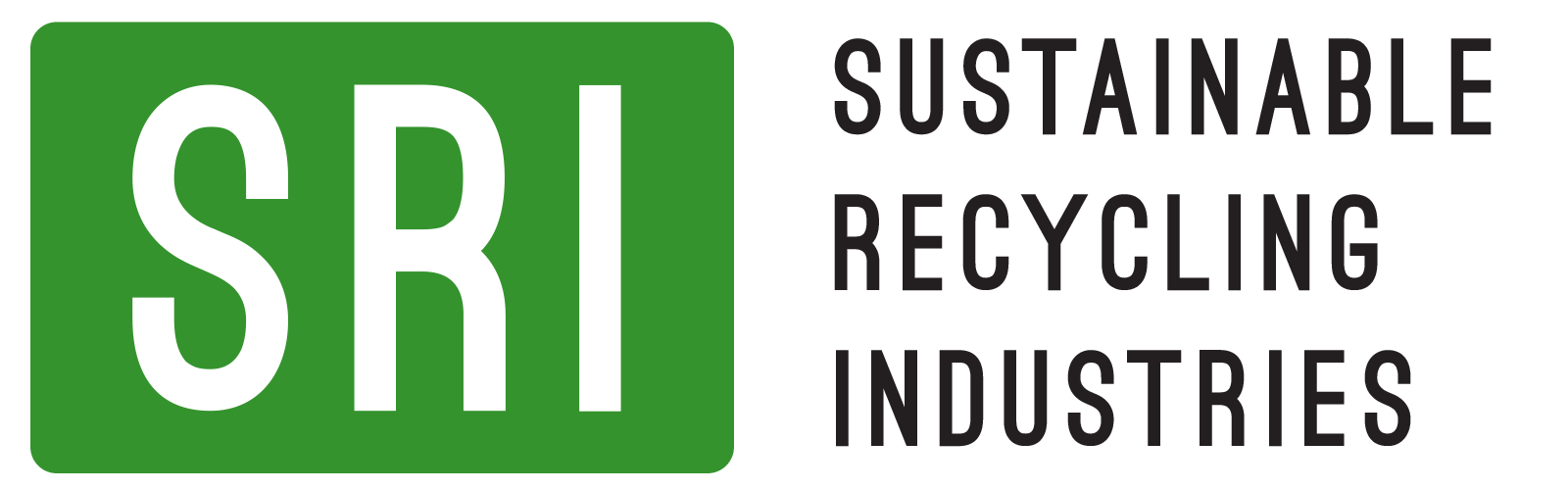
SRI Logo

The Sustainable Recycling Industries (SRI) program builds capacity for sustainable recycling in developing countries. The program is funded by the Swiss State Secretariat of Economic Affairs and is implemented by the Empa, WRF and ecoinvent. It builds on the success of implementing e-waste recycling systems together with various developing countries for more than ten years. The SRI programme attempts to attain three objectives. First, it develops basic data for the assessment of environmental and social life cycle performance for industrial activities through the improvement of local and regional expertise in Brazil, India and South Africa. Furthermore, SRI improves local capacity for sustainable recycling together with private and public institutions, as well as the informal sector in Colombia, Egypt, Ghana, India, Peru, and South Africa. Lastly, the program facilitates a stakeholder consultation for the development of sustainability criteria for secondary raw materials. This has resulted in the ISO International Workshop Agreement on the 'Guidance Principles for the Sustainable Management of Secondary Metals' (ISO IWA 19:2017), which was launched at the Thirteenth Meeting of the Conference of the Parties to the Basel Convention. This new ISO document aims to guide economic operators of secondary metals value chains, including the informal sector, in the efficient and credible implementation of improved recycling practices, in particular in emerging and developing economies. The video "Tales of Trash: 5 Principles for Inclusive Recycling" introduces the program in just 3,5 minutes.

=== CEWASTE ===
CEWASTE is a two-year project funded by European Union's Horizon 2020 research and innovation program. It will develop a voluntary certification scheme for waste treatment. Specifically, the CEWASTE project will create, validate and launch the scheme for collection, transport and treatment facilities of key types of waste containing significant amounts of valuable and critical raw materials such as waste electrical and electronic equipment (WEEE) and batteries. The project has received funding from the European Union's Horizon 2020 research and innovation programme.

=== CICERONE ===
CICERONE is a project to build a joint platform for efficient circular economy programming. It seeks to involve all actors in society in the switch to circular practices for a more sustainable economy. It is in cooperation with a variety of practitioners including government bodies, research and technology organisations, civil society, industry, SMEs, startups, cities and investors. The project has received funding from the European Union's Horizon 2020 research and innovation programme.

=== RE-SOURCING ===
The project will set up a Global Stakeholder Platform for Responsible Sourcing (RS). This platform is expected to facilitate the development of a globally accepted definition of RS and develop ideas for incentives facilitating responsible business conduct in the EU, enable exchange of stakeholders for information exchange and promotion, foster the emergence of RS in international political fora, and to support the European Innovation Partnership on Raw Materials. The project has received funding from the European Union's Horizon 2020 research and innovation programme.

=== FORAM ===
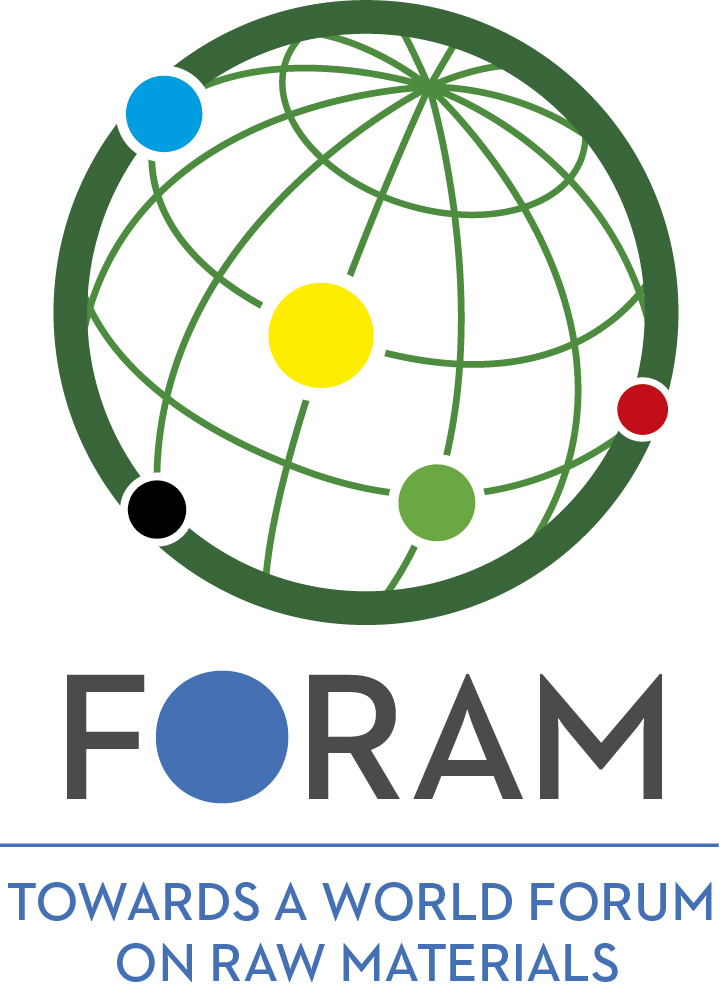
FORAM Logo

The project Towards a World Forum on Raw Materials (FORAM) developed and set up an EU-based platform of international experts and stakeholders, advancing the international cooperation on raw material policies and investments. The platform works together on making the current complex maze of existing raw material related initiatives more effective. As such, the FORAM project is said to be the largest collaborative effort for raw materials strategy cooperation on a global level so date. The project has received funding from the European Union's Horizon 2020 research and innovation programme.

The global use of mineral resources has drastically increased and supply chains have become ever more complex. Several global initiatives and organizations have been contributing to knowledge and information transfer, including the European Commission, the European Geological Survey, the European Federation of Geologists, UNEP International Resource Panel, the World Resources Forum, the World Materials Forum, the Organisation for Economic Co-operation and Development and others. It is widely felt that improved international resource transparency and governance would be beneficial for all, since it would lead to stability, predictability, resource-efficiency and hence a better foundation for competitiveness on a sustainable basis.

FORAM 18 - the pilot event of the project - was organised on 27 June 2018 in Nancy, France, back-to-back with the World Materials Forum. Gerben-Jan Gerbrandy, Member of the European Parliament, was one of the keynote speakers. Launching and preparatory events have been held in Brussels during Raw Materials Week, and Geneva, as part of the World Resources Forum 2017.

=== Providing e-learning platforms and webinars ===
WRF also takes up a leading role in the planning, coordination and production of massive open online courses on issues such as e-waste, resource efficiency and circular economy. Examples are the MOOC on e-waste and the MOCC on decoupling with partners such as UN Environment International Resources Panel, Secretariat of the Basel Convention, Climate-KIC, Stellenbosch University and engageability.

=== Other projects and programs ===
In addition to the dissemination of scientific reports and papers, WRF also funds publications and papers in collaboration with universities and research institutes. In cooperation with Leiden University, WRF published the paper Towards a resource-efficiency index of nations.
