= Bas de Leeuw =

Dutch economist (born 1959)

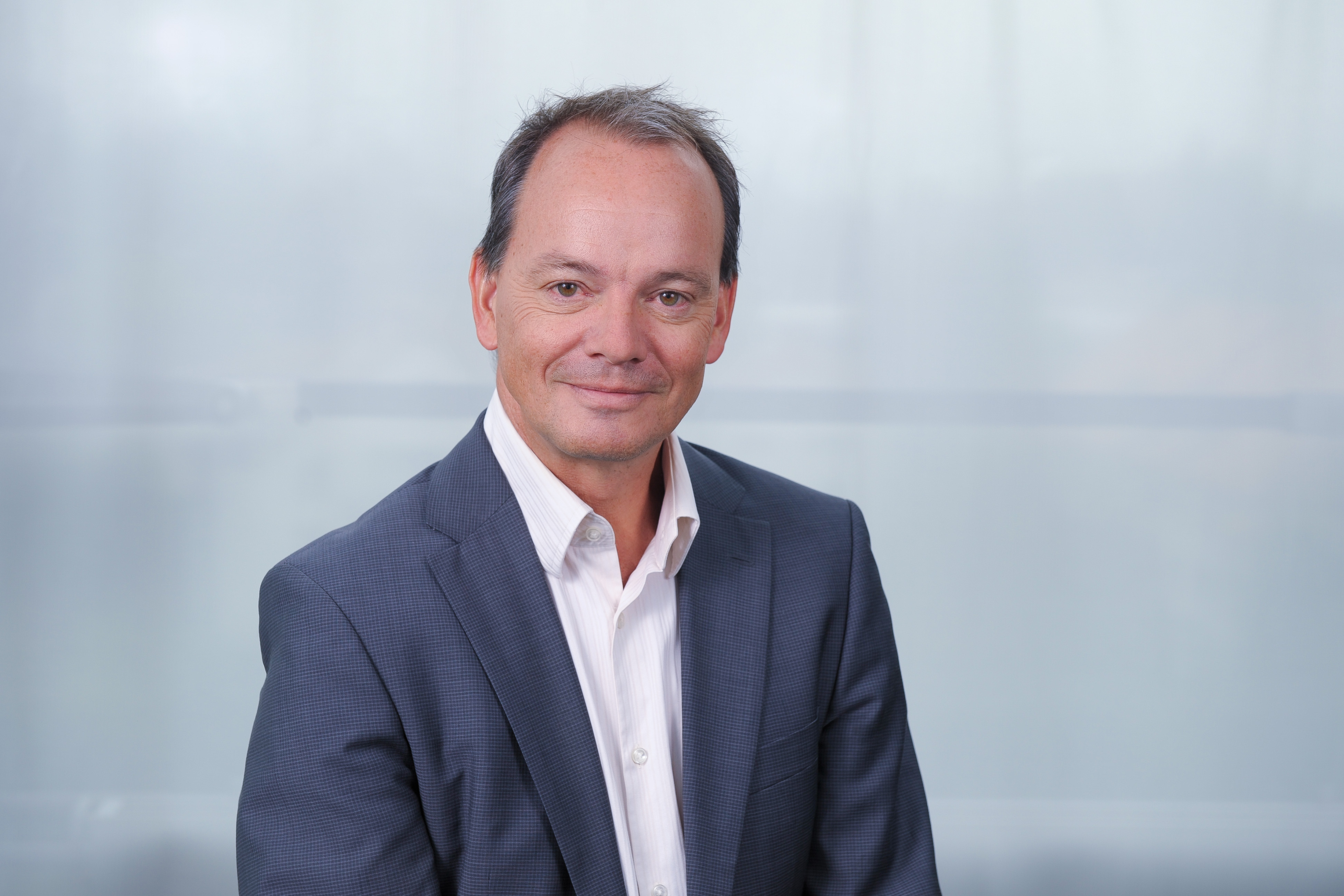
- Education: Erasmus University Rotterdam, (MA)
- Occupation: Managing Director World Resources Forum

Bas de Leeuw (born 1959) is a Dutch economist and sustainability expert. He is currently Managing Director of the World Resources Forum.

== Career ==
After graduation from the Erasmus University Rotterdam, de Leeuw held various positions in the Dutch Ministries of Economic Affairs and Infrastructure. In 1997, he started his international career and joined the United Nations Environment Programme. Based in UN Environment's Economy Division in Paris, he introduced programs at the nexus of sustainable consumption, lifestyle, advertising and resource management. He has set up and managed several new UN initiatives, such as the Sustainable Consumption Program, the Marrakesh Process on Sustainable Consumption and Production, the International Life Cycle Panel, and the International Resource Panel. He was Head of the Secretariat of the last two. He has also worked as a National Expert for the OECD on sustainable consumption policies.

In 2009, Leeuw became Executive Director of the Sustainability Institute, founded by Donella Meadows. The institute based in Vermont, USA, was later rebranded as Donella Meadows Institute and Donella Meadows Project.

In 2011 he led the spinoff of the Swiss-based World Resources Forum, which used to be an initiative of the interdisciplinary Swiss research institute for applied materials sciences and technology, Empa. He initiated the transformation towards an independent non-profit international organization that serves as a platform connecting and fostering knowledge exchange on resources management amongst business leaders, policy-makers, NGOs, scientists and the public. He introduced professional management and communication programs, such as the WRF Workshop Parade, nominated for the 2018 Audience Interaction Awards at the FRESH 18 Conference of the Meeting Design Institute. Apart from organising conferences the WRF has been managing or contributing to various international and regional coordination and research projects, such as Sustainable Recycling Industries (SRI), and the EC Horizon2020 projects FORAM, CICERONE, RE-SOURCING and CEWASTE, and has set up MOOCS with UNEP IRP on decoupling resource use (Resource Revolution Trainer) respectively - with the Basel Convention Secretariat and other partners - on e-waste management (the E-waste Challenge).

De Leeuw is elected full member of the Club of Rome and has served on various advisory and steering committees, including the Advisory Board of Global Action Plan International, Green Cross Netherlands and the Council of the Union of International Associations (UIA). He is currently Strategic Advisor of the One Planet Network's 10-year Framework of Programmes on Sustainable Consumption and Production Patterns (10YFP) Sustainable Lifestyles Initiative Multi-Stakeholders Advisory Committee (SLE MAC) at UN Environment and a member of the UN Task Group on Catalysing Science-based Policy Action on SCP.

== Publications ==
De Leeuw's most cited publication has been on the use of life cycle thinking for sustainable consumption and production policies, World Behind the Product. Other publications include:

- Tales of Trash, 2017, animated video on principles for responsible recycling (Sustainable Recycling Industries program)
- Towards a World Forum on Raw Materials, 2019, animated video on EC H2020 FORAM project
- Accelerating The Resource Revolution. World Resources Forum 2017 Meeting Report. ISBN 978-3-906177-18-2
- With Lewis Akenji, Magnus Bengtsson, Arnold Tukker, Raimund Bleischwitz, Sylvia Lorek, SatoshKojima, PhilipVergragt, Takeshi Kuramochi: Absolute Reductions in Material Throughput, Energy Use and Emissions. Journal of Cleaner Production 132 (2016), 1–318.
- Building Sustainable Cities and Lifestyles in Latin America and the Caribbean (LAC) – WRF LAC & International Sustainable Building Congress (ISBC) 2016 Meeting Report. ISBN 978-3-906177-14-4
- Boosting Resource Productivity by Adopting the Circular Economy – WRF 2015 Davos Meeting Report. ISBN 978-3-906177-11-3
- Innovation, Competitiveness and Resource Efficiency – WRF 2014 Arequipa Meeting Report. ISBN 978-3-906177-09-0
- with Martin Lehmann and Eric Fehr: Circular Economy: Improving the Management of Natural Resources. Swiss Academy of Engineering Sciences (2014)
- Resource Efficiency, Governance and Lifestyles – WRF 2013 Davos Meeting Report. ISBN 978-3-906177-07-6
- Towards a More Sustainable Use of Resources: A View from the World Resources Forum. Eco-Efficiency in Industry and Science (2013)
- Resources and Green Economy. Meeting Report World Resources Forum 2012. ISBN 978-3-906177-03-8
- World Resources Forum 2011: Towards a Resource Efficient Green Economy. GAIA - Ecological Perspectives for Science and Society 20/4 (2011), 277– 280
- Shaping the Future of our Natural Resources - Meeting Report World Resources Forum 2011.
- with Guido Sonnemann and Sonia Valdivia: New activities launched in Warsaw and consultations on emerging ideas. The International Journal of Life Cycle Assessment (2008)
- Life Cycle Management in Developing Countries: State of the Art and Outlook. The International Journal of Life Cycle Assessment 11 (2006), 123–126. DOI: Life Cycle Management in Developing Countries: State of the Art and Outlook
- with Guido Sonnemann: Promoting sustainable consumption and production at the international level. Governance of Integrated Product Policy (2006)
- The World Behind the Product. Journal of Industrial Ecology 9 (2005), 7-10. DOI: The World Behind the Product
- UNEP/SETAC life cycle initiative: promoting a life-cycle approach. International Journal of Life Cycle Assessment (2002)
- With Nick Robins: Rewiring global consumption: Strategies for transformation. In Sustainable solutions: Developing products and services for the future, ed. M. Charter & U. Tischner (2001). Sheffield, UK: Greenleaf Publishing Limited.
- with Garrette Clark: How to Improve Adoption of LCA. The International Journal of Life Cycle Assessment 4 (1999), 184-187
