= Resource intensity =

Resource intensity is a measure of the resources (e.g. water, energy, materials) needed for the production, processing and disposal of a unit of good or service, or for the completion of a process or activity; it is therefore a measure of the efficiency of resource use. It is often expressed as the quantity of resource embodied in unit cost e.g. litres of water per $1 spent on product. In national economic and sustainability accounting it can be calculated as units of resource expended per unit of GDP. When applied to a single person it is expressed as the resource use of that person per unit of consumption. Relatively high resource intensities indicate a high price or environmental cost of converting resource into GDP; low resource intensity indicates a lower price or environmental cost of converting resource into GDP.

Resource productivity and resource intensity are key concepts used in sustainability measurement as they measure attempts to decouple the connection between resource use and environmental degradation. Their strength is that they can be used as a metric for both economic and environmental cost. Although these concepts are two sides of the same coin, in practice they involve very different approaches and can be viewed as reflecting, on the one hand, the efficiency of resource production as outcome per unit of resource use (resource productivity) and, on the other hand, the efficiency of resource consumption as resource use per unit outcome (resource intensity). The sustainability objective is to maximize resource productivity while minimizing resource intensity.

== Use in policy and sustainability measurement ==
Resource intensity is widely used in international sustainability reporting and policy analysis. Organisations such as the Organisation for Economic Co-operation and Development (OECD) and the United Nations Environment Programme (UNEP) use resource intensity indicators to assess progress toward decoupling economic growth from environmental degradation.

== See also ==
- Bioeconomics
- Econophysics
- Energy and Environment
- Energy intensity
- Environmental economics
- Energy Accounting
- Ecodynamics
- Ecological Economics
- Industrial ecology
- Population dynamics
- Resource productivity
- Sustainability accounting
- Sustainable development
- Systems ecology
- Thermoeconomics
