= Stefan Bringezu =

German researcher

Stefan Bringezu is a German environmental scientist. He has conducted pioneering research in the field of material flow analysis and derived policy-relevant indicators of resource use, which contributed to statistical standards in the EU, OECD, and UNEP and environmental footprinting across scales. He had been selected as inaugural member of the International Panel for Sustainable Resource Management (now: International Resource Panel) and lead-coordinated in three of their reports. He was scientific director of the Center for Environmental Systems Research at Kassel University, Germany.
