= Oberle =

Oberle is a surname. Notable people with the surname include:

- Emil Oberle (1889–1955), German amateur footballer
- Eugene Oberle (1929-2010), American politician
- Florence Oberle (1869–1943), American actress
- Frank Oberle Sr. (1932–2024), Canadian politician
- Bruno Oberle (born 1955), Swiss environmentalist
- Frank Oberle Jr. (born 1957), Canadian politician
