= Anders Wijkman =

Swedish politician (born 1944)

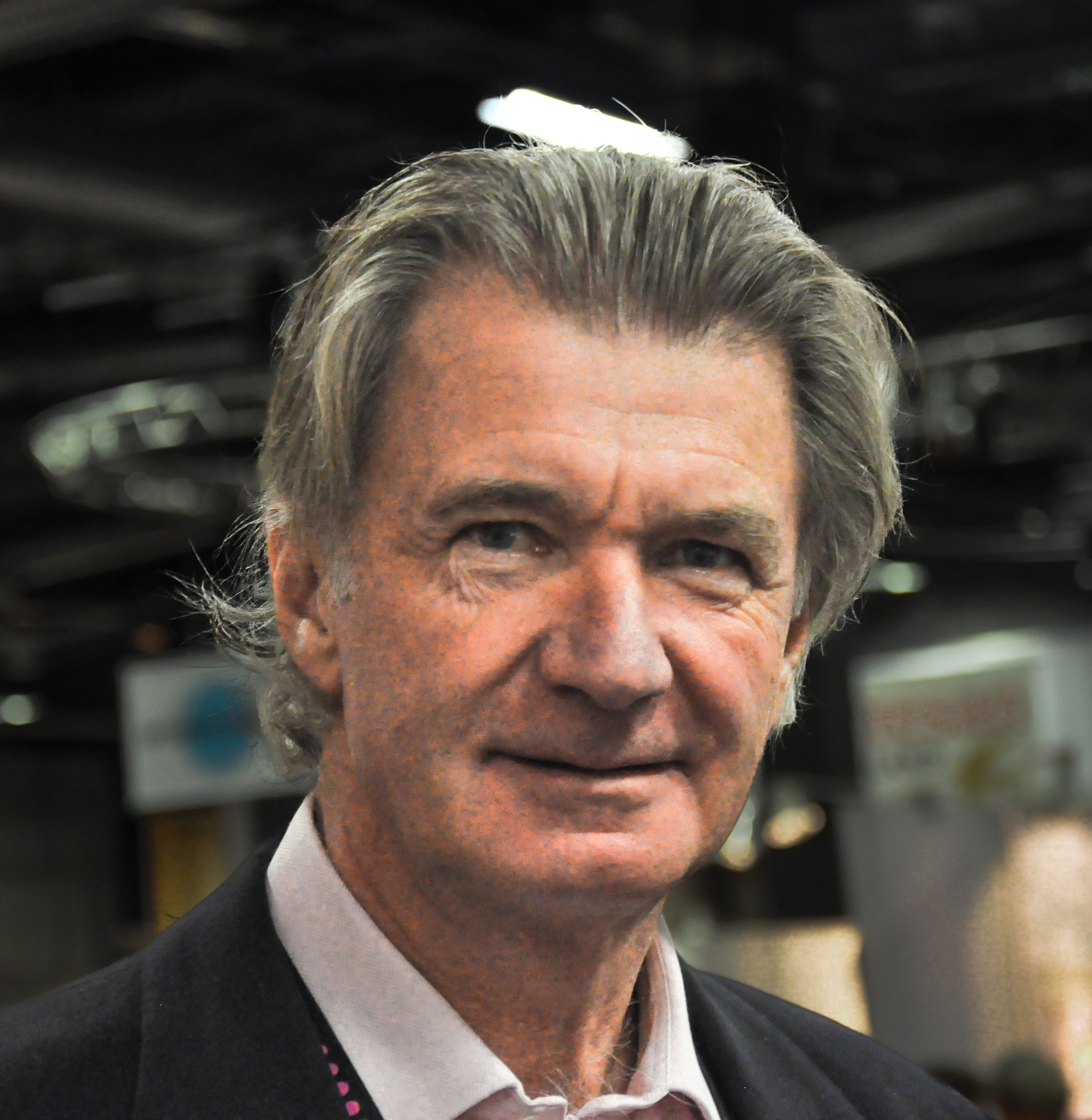
- Anders Wijkman in 2009
- Born: 30 September 1944 (age 81); Stockholm, Sweden
- Occupation: Member of Swedish Christian Democrat Party

Anders Ivar Sven Wijkman (born 30 September 1944) is a Swedish politician (Swedish: Kristdemokraterna, KD) who was Member of the European Parliament from 1999 to 2009. As a member of the European Parliament, he focused on issues related to climate change, environment, development cooperation and humanitarian affairs. He is a member of the Christian Democrats, part of the European People's Party - European Democrats group.

He sat on the European Parliament's Committee on the Environment, Public Health and Food Safety. He was also a substitute for the Committee on Development, a member of the delegation to the ACP-EU Joint Parliamentary Assembly, and a substitute for the delegation for relations with the United States.

Anders has been a member of the Swedish parliament, secretary general of the Swedish Red Cross, and president of the International Red Cross Disaster Relief Commission. Anders Wijkman is Co-President of Club of Rome and the Tällberg Foundation, and is a member of the Royal Swedish Academy of Sciences. He is also a councillor for the World Future Council.

== Career ==
- University degree (1967)
- Secretary-General of the Swedish Red Cross (1979–1988) and the Swedish Society for Nature Conservation (1989–1991)
- Director-General of the Swedish Agency for Research Cooperation with Developing Countries (1992–1994)
- Ambassador, Ministry of Foreign Affairs (since 1998)
- Member of the Swedish Parliament (1971–1978)
- Vice-Chairman of Committee on Development and Cooperation (2002–2004)
- Assistant Secretary-General of United Nations and Policy Director of UNDP (1995–1997)
- Member of the Club of Rome
- Member of International Factor 10 Club
- Member of the World Academy of Art and Science
- Member of the Board of Lead International
- Member of the Board of the World Resources Forum
- Member of the Royal Swedish Academy of Sciences
- Member of the Royal Academy of Agriculture and Forestry, Sweden
- Chairman of the board of the National Museum of Natural History
- Chairman of the board of the ZERI Foundation
- Member of the European Parliament (1999–2009)
- Chair of the Governing Board of Climate-KIC since 2017
- Member of the board of Think-thank Tankesmedjan Global Utmaning
