= Resource consumption =

Ecological and economic concept

Resource consumption is about the consumption of non-renewable, or less often, renewable resources. Specifically, it may refer to:

- water consumption
- energy consumption
  - electric energy consumption
  - world energy consumption
- natural gas consumption/gas depletion
- oil consumption/oil depletion
- logging/deforestation
- fishing/overfishing
- land use/land loss or
- resource depletion and
- general exploitation and associated environmental degradation

Measures of resource consumption are resource intensity and resource efficiency. Industrialization and globalized markets have increased the tendency for overconsumption of resources. The resource consumption rate of a nation does not usually correspond with primary resource availability, this is called resource curse.

Unsustainable consumption by the steadily growing human population may lead to resource depletion and a shrinking of the earth's carrying capacity.

== See also ==
- Ecological footprint
- Jevons paradox
- Natural resource management
- Scarcity
- Uneconomic growth
