= SITRA =

Public Finnish fund

The Finnish Innovation Fund Sitra
- Finnish: Suomen itsenäisyyden juhlarahasto
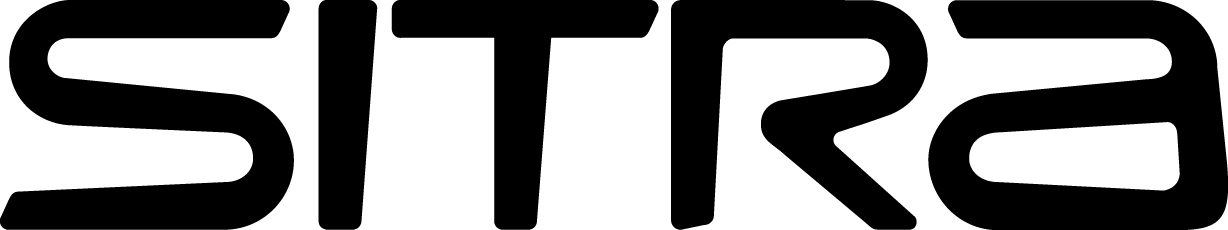
- Sitra's logo

Agency overview
- Formed: 1967
- Type: independent fund
- Headquarters: Ruoholahti, Helsinki
- Agency executive: Mikko Kosonen, President
- Parent agency: Parliament of Finland
- Website: www.sitra.fi/en

Sitra (Finnish: Suomen itsenäisyyden juhlarahasto), the Finnish Innovation Fund, is an independent public foundation which operates directly under the supervision of the Finnish Parliament. Its endowment was valued at 771 million euros in 2017. Its duties are stated in legislation: the objective of the foundation is "to promote stable and balanced development in Finland, qualitative and quantitative economic growth and international competitiveness and cooperation", by means of supporting "projects that increase the efficiency of the economy, improve the level of education or research, or study future development scenarios". Sitra functions both as a think tank and as an investment company. Sitra was founded in 1967 as a part of the Bank of Finland, on the country's 50th anniversary. However, most of the value of its current endowment comes from a donation of Nokia stock from the Finnish Parliament in 1992.

Sitra's operational independence has been further strengthened by its funding model. It is not answerable to the government in power and does not depend on the state budget; instead, its operations are funded with the profits of its endowment and the profits of its operations. According to law, the funds must be invested securely and in a profitable manner. The return from Sitra's endowment averages at approximately 30 million euros a year. Sitra does not spend the core endowment or receive any tax-generated government funding. While Sitra can be compared to Business Finland, their roles are different: Sitra invests in companies and startups to create new profitable business, while Business Finland is a part of the government through a ministry and funds research in companies or universities without an explicit profit motive.

== Operations ==
In practice, Sitra's work consists of research, studies, trials, pilots, events, and training that are all closely related to Sitra's three strategic themes. These strategic themes present the most central challenges for the future sustainable well-being in Finland.

=== "A Carbon-Neutral Circular Economy" theme ===
The goal of the theme is to build sustainable everyday life based on a circular economy, where well-being is not built upon the overconsumption of fossil fuels. Recently, Sitra has for example published the world's first national road map for a circular economy and launched trials of the road map. In addition, Sitra was the main organizer of the world's first World Circular Economy Forum in 2017. The event gathered the world's top business leaders, policymakers, researchers, and innovators to present the world's best circular economy solutions on 5-7 June in Helsinki.

The on-going projects within the Circular Economy theme are Sustainable everyday life, A circular economy and Climate solutions. In the transition to a circular economy, all solutions have a role to play in enabling and implementing the transition, even podcasts.

=== "Capacity for Renewal" theme ===
The theme aims to strengthen the ability and will of Finnish society to renew itself. In recent years, Sitra has introduced the groundbreaking data exchange layer concept, the youth work approach and information system Tajua Mut! (Get me!) and the Palvelutori concept for senior citizen services. Sitra has also promoted the drafting of the national genome strategy and created the virtual clinic concept, which is unique even by international standards.

The on-going projects within the Capacity for Renewal theme are Fair data economy, Well-being data, Human-driven Health and Public-sector leadership.

=== "New Working Life and a Sustainable Economy" theme ===
The theme promotes efforts to find new solutions for work and the economy, experiments with those solutions and helps guide their practical implementation. Among other things, Sitra has built an ecosystem for impact investing and launched the first social impact bonds in Finland.

The on-going projects with the Working Life and a Sustainable Economy theme are Lifelong learning and Impact investing.

=== Foresight and Insight ===
The on-going projects within the Foresight and Insight theme are Megatrends, Weak signals, The Next Era, Timeout, Knowledge in decision-making and Education for a Changing World.

=== Training ===
The on-going projects within Training are Leadership training for sustainable economic policy and Sitra Lab.

== See also ==
- Business Finland
