= World Circular Economy Forum =

- WCEF logo
- Date: 2017–present
- Organized by: SITRA
- Website: https://wcef.global

For the radio station in Ripley, West Virginia, USA, see WCEF.

The World Circular Economy Forum (WCEF) is an annual event which brings together business leaders, policymakers and experts to advance the transition to a circular economy. Organisers promote the circular economy because it can mitigate climate change, biodiversity loss, waste and pollution by using techniques such as smarter design, digital innovation and service-based models to preserve resources. The WCEF is a global initiative of Finland and the Finnish Innovation Fund SITRA.

== About ==
The two-day annual forum consists of speeches, discussions, presentations and networking about circular economy solutions. The main event is amended by two days of accelerator sessions hosted by collaborating organisations. In addition to these, many complementary events are organised throughout the year.

The main event is held in a different country every year and has about 2,000 invited attendees from the government, business, non-profit and academia sectors. Free online participation is always available to the public.

The WCEF covers global, regional and local topics relevant to the circular economy. These include e.g., bioeconomy, the built environment, critical minerals, data and AI, design, education, energy, finance, food, governance, nature, plastics and waste.

The Finnish Innovation Fund Sitra organises each WCEF with local co-hosts and international partners. Partners have included a variety of organisations, including the Governments of Finland, Canada and the Netherlands; the United Nations Environmental Programme; the European Investment Bank; the African Circular Economy Network and the World Economic Forum.

WCEF2026 took place in Gandhinagar, Gujarat, from 15 to 18 September 2026 at the Mahatma Mandir convention centre, hosted jointly by the Finnish Innovation Fund SITRA and the Central Pollution Control Board (CPCB) which operates under India’s Ministry of Environment, Forest and Climate Change. Read more about the circular economy in India and pre-events.

== History ==
The WCEF was initially conceived in 2015 and was first held in 2017. It has been held in Africa, Asia, Europe, North America and South America. The event was solely online in 2020 due to travel restrictions during the COVID-19 pandemic.

== List of conferences ==
Year	Name	Host country
2017	WCEF2017	Finland
2018	WCEF2018	Japan
2019	WCEF2019	Finland
2020	WCEFOnline	Finland
2021	WCEF+Climate	Netherlands
2021	WCEF2021	Canada
2022	WCEF2022	Rwanda
2023	WCEF2023	Finland
2024	WCEF2024	Belgium
2025	WCEF2025	Brazil
2026	WCEF2026	India
2027	WCEF2027	USA
