= The Natural Edge Project =

Australian think-tank for sustainability

The Natural Edge Project (TNEP) was an not-for-profit think-tank.

== Description ==
The Natural Edge Project (TNEP) was located in a number of Australian cities. Members were hosted and mentored by several universities, including Griffith, Adelaide, QUT, and Curtin, in collaboration with the Institution of Engineers Australia.

The patron of TNEP in 2005 was Sir Ninian Stephen, former Governor General of Australia.

== Publications ==
- Natural Capitalism by Amory Lovins (1999)
- The Natural Advantage of Nations edited by Karlson Hargroves and Michael H Smith (2005)

== Awards ==
The Natural Edge Project was the winner of the 2005 Banksia Award for Environmental Leadership Education and Training. The Banksia Awards aims to recognise individuals and organisations for work in the environment.
