= Global Action Plan International =

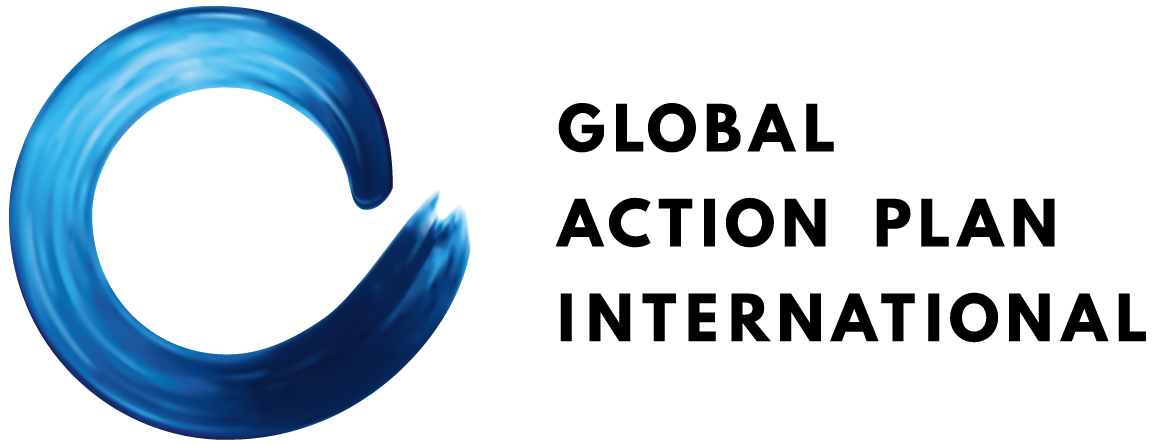

Global Action Plan (GAP) International is a global network of organisations who work together with the aim of empowering individuals to adopt sustainable lifestyles. The network comprises 21 member organisations which span across 16 countries all over the world, including Europe, Asia, Africa and Latin America.

GAP International runs regular events for its member organisations, which hold a common theme of sustainability and behaviour change. Members also collaborate on various international programmes, from inspiring water-wise learners in schools and creating energy efficient households and communities, to helping people live happier, healthier, and more planet-friendly lifestyles.

== Mission ==
The mission of GAP I is to be a global behaviour change catalyst. All members of GAP I work together to promote and implement approaches that empower people around the world to adopt truly sustainable lifestyles. GAP I's vision is a thriving planet with caring people and resilient societies.

All GAP I programmes are based on three fundamental values:

1) GAP I is aspirational: The network shares a positive vision of a more sustainable world where engaged people live in just and inclusive societies that respect planetary boundaries.

2) GAP I empowers people to change the way they live and work. GAP I meets people where they are and supports them in finding their own motivation for change.

3) GAP I is impactful: GAP I develops programmes that use the latest research findings to bring about measurable and lasting change. The network is always action-orientated and works on long-term solutions.^

== Approach ==
“Action” is the keyword to GAPI’s common approach. GAP I sees action as practice, as a way of transforming behaviour, social arrangements, rules and policies in response to the manifold global and local crises with which people are confronted. Action is not a one-off exercise. It allows for practising and experiencing actual changes. Through action, people are becoming empowered, individually and collectively.

GAP International’s approach to behaviour change is cyclical and based on the belief that engaging a person’s emotions, desires, beliefs and social relationships is the best way to create true care for long-lasting, continuous action. Thus, it is a process of ‘success’ and ‘relapse’ and a process of enthusiasm and frustration that is gradual and requires long-term attention and care. To the extent that a group or community embraces the change process, believes in it and takes care of it, the changes will become more embedded in the daily life of the group, they will go deeper and wider, and they will last longer.

GAP-I members support the people they work with – young or adult – to lead lives, choose education and career pathways and make daily choices and decisions that are in closer alignment with our natural compassionate values. They are supported in building resilience against and crowding out the all-pervading self-interest values continuously flooding our society and communities. GAP I helps people to develop the curiosity, confidence, capability, and compassion to question and challenge the status quo and become change makers for life, no matter what the setting, the issue or their age and stage.

It is in the practice itself that people experience being in charge of their own behaviour change while acquiring the necessary information and knowledge, rather than being simply recipients of such information. It is in the practice of actually changing behaviour that people actively learn new skills and new attitudes and develop new norms governing their relationships with others.
