= Thermoeconomics =

Heterodox economic theory

Thermoeconomics, also referred to as bioeconomics or biophysical economics, is a school of heterodox economics that applies the laws of thermodynamics to economic theory. Thermoeconomics applies statistical mechanics to economic value. It is a subfield of econophysics, extenuating to ecological economics.

Thermoeconomics studies the ways and means by which human societies procure and use energy and other biological and physical resources to produce, distribute, consume and exchange goods and services, while generating various types of waste and environmental impacts. Biophysical economics builds on both social sciences and natural sciences to overcome some of the most fundamental limitations and blind spots of conventional economics. It makes it possible to understand some key requirements and framework conditions for economic growth, as well as related constraints and boundaries.

== Thermodynamics ==
"Rien ne se perd, rien ne se crée, tout se transforme"

"Nothing is lost, nothing is created, everything is transformed."

-- Antoine Lavoisier

Thermoeconomists maintain that human economic systems can be modeled as thermodynamic systems. Thermoeconomists argue that economic systems always involve matter, energy, entropy, and information.

The thermodynamic approach helps to formulate the relationship between the production output $Y$ and the traditinal producton factors. Among four established forms of the production function, one can find the functions on labour $L$ and capital $K$

$Y = Y_0 \, \frac{L}{L_0}\left(\frac {L_0}{L}\left[\frac{K}{K_0}\right]^{\overline{\varepsilon}} \, \right)^\alpha, \quad 0 < \alpha = \frac{1 - \overline{\lambda}}{\overline{\varepsilon} - \overline{\lambda}}< 1 \quad$

$Y = Y_0 \, \frac{ K }{ K_0}$

These formulae contain also the technological characteristics of the production equipment: labour and energy requirements, $\overline \lambda (t)$ and $\overline \varepsilon (t)$. These quantities indicate the amounts of labour and productive energy required to operate a unit of production equipment.

The first relation from (1) represents the law of labour substitution by capital. An increase in output can be achieved through increasing relative labour expenses, or the relative amount of capital. An analysis of substitution mechanisms shows that workers' efforts to produce goods are substituted by the work of the production equipment, not by equipment itself. The substitution coefficient depends on technological characteristics of production equipment. The thermodynamic results correct empirical specification of the dependence of output on the labour $L$ and physical capital $K$; the existing empirical formulae for the calculation of output do not contain the appropriate technological characteristics of production equipment.

It is possible to think that these results provide a solid thermodynamic foundation for the theory of economic production. In any case, understanding the quantitative relationship between outputs and resources can be beneficial in the development of mathematical models of production.

Based on this premise, theoretical economic analogs of the first and second laws of thermodynamics are developed. The global economy is viewed as an open system.

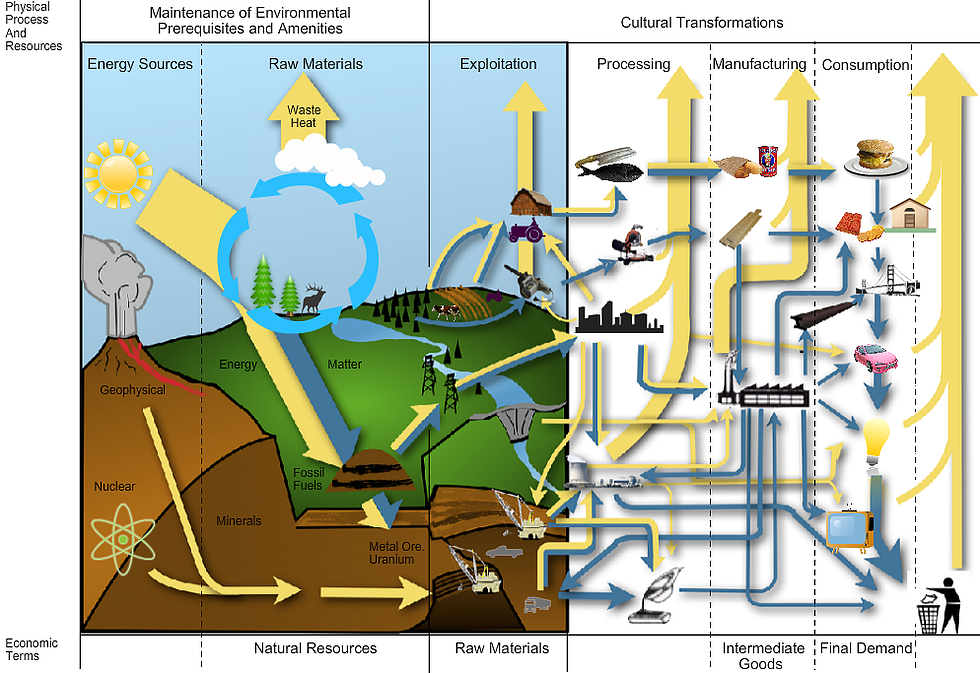
A comprehensive and accurate model of how real economic systems work

Moreover, many economic activities result in the formation of social classes. Thermoeconomics applies the statistical mechanics of non-equilibrium thermodynamics to model these activities. In thermodynamic terminology, human economic activity may be described as a dissipative system, which flourishes by consuming free energy in transformations and exchange of resources, goods, and services.

== Energy return on investment ==
$$EROI = \frac{\text{Energy returned to society}}{\text{Energy required to get that energy}}$$

Thermoeconomics is based on the proposition that the role of energy in biological evolution should be defined and understood not through the second law of thermodynamics but in terms of such economic criteria as productivity, efficiency, and especially the costs and benefits (or profitability) of the various mechanisms for capturing and utilizing available energy to build biomass and do work.

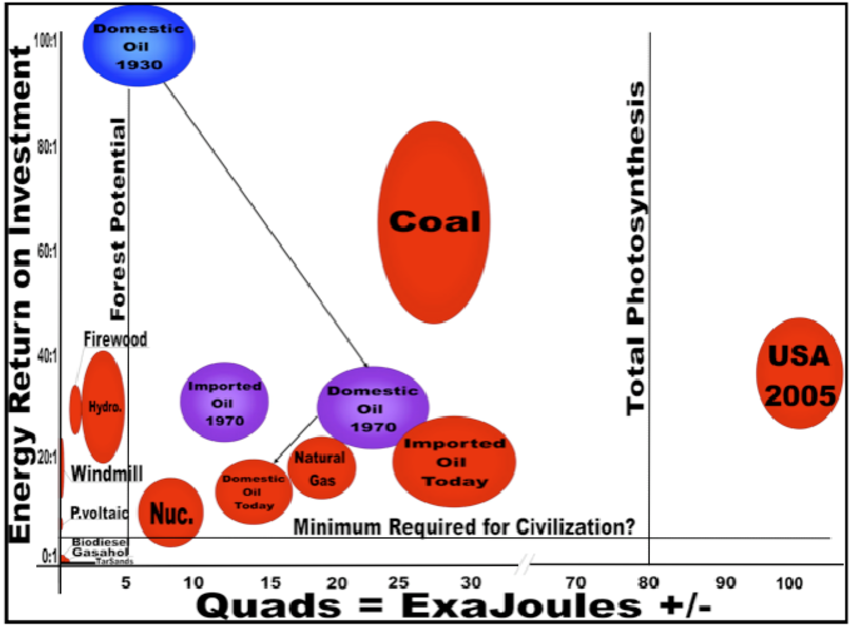
Quality EROI

== Peak oil ==
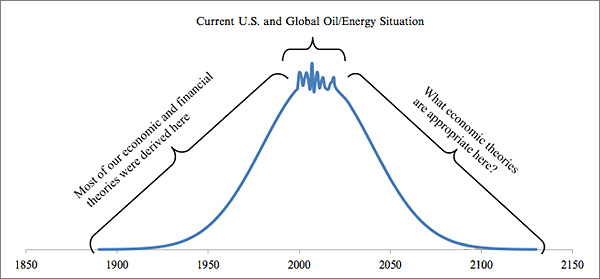
Current US/Global Oil/Energy situation. The Y-axis is the production (and availability) of fossil fuels.

=== Political implications ===
"[T]he escalation of social protest and political instability around the world is causally related to the unstoppable thermodynamics of global hydrocarbon energy decline and its interconnected environmental and economic consequences."

=== Energy backed credit ===
One 2020 analysis concluded that a reduction of GDP in advanced economies is likely when the economy can no longer access consumption by adding credit and when there is a shift towards lower quality and more costly energy and resources. The analysis predicts decreasing energy quality and increasing energy costs in the 21st century.

== See also ==
- Ecodynamics
- Kinetic exchange models of markets
- Systems ecology
- Nicholas Georgescu-Roegen
- Energy quality
- Limits to growth
- Myron Tribus
