= Bruno Oberle =

Swiss biologist (born 1931)

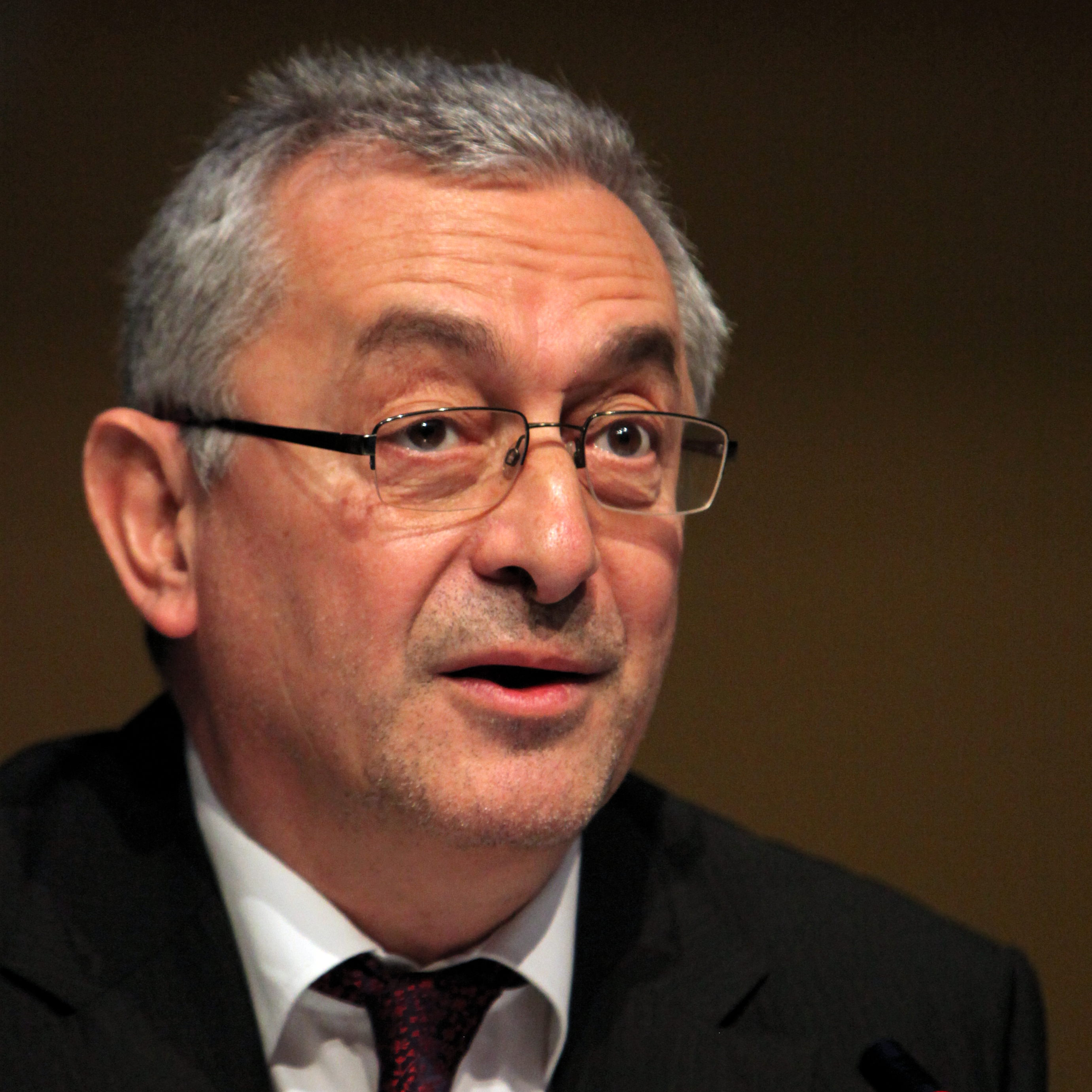
- Bruno Oberle

Director General of the International Union for Conservation of Nature
- In office August 2020 – July 2023

Personal details
- Born: 12 October 1955 (age 71) St. Gallen, Switzerland
- Education: ETH Zurich (PhD)
- Occupation: Environmental scientist, environmental protection, environmental management

Bruno Oberle (born 12 October 1955) is a Swiss environmental scientist and former senior civil servant whose career has centred on environmental policy, sustainable resource management, green economy, biodiversity, climate policy and international environmental governance. He served as Director of the Swiss Federal Office for the Environment (FOEN) from 2005 to 2015 and represented Switzerland internationally as State Secretary for the Environment. From July 2020 to June 2023, he was Director General of the International Union for Conservation of Nature (IUCN).

== Education and early career ==
Oberle studied biology and environmental sciences at ETH Zurich, completed additional education in political economy and pedagogy, and obtained a doctorate from ETH Zurich. He subsequently lectured for several years in ETH Zurich's Department of Environmental Sciences. From 1980 to 1999, he founded and managed two consulting firms specialising in environmental management and environmental protection.

His consulting work included assignments in Switzerland and internationally, with an early focus on building environmental-management capacity and introducing environmental impact assessment in North and West Africa. Projects in Algeria, Mali, Morocco and Tunisia formed part of this work.

== Swiss federal administration ==
In 1999, Oberle joined the then Swiss Agency for the Environment, Forests and Landscape (BUWAL) as Deputy Director. He became Director in 2005. On 1 January 2006, BUWAL was merged with substantial parts of the Federal Office for Water and Geology to form the Federal Office for the Environment (FOEN/BAFU), with Oberle as Director.

During his tenure, FOEN developed a broader approach to environmental policy centred on sustainable resource management and international interdependence. Green economy, climate and biodiversity became major priorities, linking environmental protection more closely with economic policy and the management of natural resources.

== Climate policy and emissions trading ==
Climate policy was one of Oberle's central responsibilities. Under his leadership period at FOEN, Switzerland used a combination of regulatory and market-based instruments and fulfilled its Kyoto Protocol commitment for 2008–2012 through domestic reductions, international certificates and carbon sequestration by Swiss forests.

Oberle played a leading role on the Swiss side in negotiations to link the Swiss emissions trading system with the European Union Emissions Trading System. Negotiations began in 2011; after their conclusion, Oberle, Dominique Paravicini and the European Commission's Jos Delbeke initialled the negotiated agreement in January 2016.

== International climate negotiations and Green Climate Fund ==
As State Secretary for the Environment, Oberle represented Switzerland for more than a decade in international environmental negotiations, including under the United Nations Framework Convention on Climate Change (UNFCCC). At COP18 in Doha in 2012, he and Mariyam Shakeela of the Maldives conducted the informal ministerial consultations on finance, helping to prepare compromise language for the final negotiations.

Oberle was a Swiss member of the Transitional Committee established in 2011 to design the Green Climate Fund. He contributed directly to the design process, including through a documented submission on finance entry points and funding modalities.

== Sustainable finance ==
During the later years of Oberle's leadership of FOEN, the relationship between environmental policy and the financial system became an explicit field of Swiss environmental policy. FOEN supported the UNEP Inquiry into the Design of a Sustainable Financial System from the outset and initiated a dialogue with Swiss financial-sector stakeholders. Oberle contributed the foreword to the Swiss report and was listed among the Swiss team contributing to the Inquiry.

== EPFL ==
After leaving the federal administration, Oberle was appointed Adjunct Professor of Green Economy at the École Polytechnique Fédérale de Lausanne (EPFL), taking up the position in January 2016. EPFL cited his experience in sustainable resource management, green economy and environmental management.

== International Resource Panel ==
Oberle was a member of the United Nations Environment Programme’s International Resource Panel (IRP) and served as coordinating lead author of the Global Resources Outlook 2019: Natural Resources for the Future We Want. The report provided a comprehensive assessment of global trends in natural resource extraction and use and their relationship with economic development and human well-being. It highlighted the links between resource use, climate change and biodiversity loss and examined pathways towards greater resource efficiency and the decoupling of economic development from environmental pressures.

== Global Tailings Review ==
Following the Brumadinho tailings dam disaster in Brazil in January 2019, UNEP, the Principles for Responsible Investment and the International Council on Mining and Metals convened the Global Tailings Review and appointed Oberle as its independent Chair. He led the multi-stakeholder review process that produced the Global Industry Standard on Tailings Management, launched in August 2020 after international consultation.

== Director General of IUCN ==
Oberle became Director General of IUCN in July 2020 and served until the end of June 2023.

He assumed office during the COVID-19 pandemic and led IUCN through the World Conservation Congress in Marseille in 2021, the Union’s principal global congress. During his tenure, IUCN expanded scalable workstreams linking conservation with agriculture, economy and finance, strengthened its financial sustainability, and restructured and modernised parts of the Secretariat.

Under Oberle’s leadership, IUCN also strengthened the connection between its biodiversity knowledge and economic and financial decision-making, including through cooperation with the Taskforce on Nature-related Financial Disclosures.

== World Resources Forum and other advisory activities ==
Oberle became President of the World Resources Forum after having previously served on its board. As President, his work with the Forum has focused on sustainable natural-resource management, resource efficiency, circular economy and the governance of resource transitions.

He has also held international expert and advisory roles in resource governance, sustainable finance and responsible mining. These include work with the International Resource Panel and the Consolidated Mining Standard Initiative. He was also co-president of the Green Digital Finance Alliance.

== See also ==
- Inger Andersen (environmentalist)
- Julia Marton-Lefèvre
