= International Resource Panel =

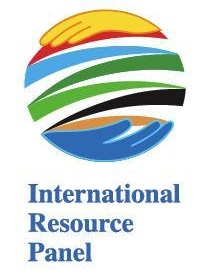
- Abbreviation: IRP
- Formation: 2007
- Type: Independent scientific panel
- Key people: Janez Potočnik and Izabella Teixeira (co-chairs)
- Parent organisation: UN Environment
- Website: https://www.resourcepanel.org/

The International Resource Panel is a scientific panel of experts that aims to help nations use natural resources sustainably without compromising economic growth and human needs. It provides independent scientific assessments and expert advice on a variety of areas, including:

- The volume of selected raw material reserves and how efficiently these resources are being used
- The lifecycle-long environmental impacts of products and services created and consumed around the globe
- options to meet human and economic needs with fewer or cleaner resources.

The Secretariat of the IRP is hosted by the United Nations Environment Programme (UN Environment) through its office in Paris, France.

== Structure of the IRP ==
The Panel has more than 35 expert members drawn from a wide range of academic institutions and scientific disciplines, supported by a small Secretariat hosted by UNEP. It is co-chaired by Janez Potočnik, former European Commissioner for the Environment, and Izabella Teixeira, former Environment Minister of Brazil. Its Steering Committee is drawn from representatives of governments, the European Commission (EC) and UNEP. It guides the Panel's strategic direction, ensures policy relevance, and oversees budgets.

== History of the IRP ==
While climate change and biodiversity loss have emerged as the world's most pressing environmental issues in recent decades, both issues are increasingly being seen as symptomatic of a broader problem of overuse of resources and lack of attention to the impacts on the environment they cause. The resources in question include materials (fossil fuels, biomass, construction minerals and metals), water, land and energy.

The 2005 Millennium Ecosystem Assessment found that rapid rises in human demands for natural resources have caused substantial and irreversible loss of biodiversity Our current rate of consumption of resources such as fossil fuels, metals, water and timber, is unsustainable and inequitable. WWF has pointed out that if we continue to consume resources at current levels, by 2050 we will need two planet's worth of natural materials to support the human race.

The concept of sustainable use of resources was placed on the global governance agenda in 1992 at the United Nations Conference on Environment and Development or ‘Earth Summit’ in Rio de Janeiro, Brazil. By 2005, several leading international environmental organisations were undertaking disparate work related to natural resources. The OECD was investigating sustainable materials management, the European Commission put forward a new Strategy on the Sustainable Use of Natural Resources used in Europe and UN Environment was conducting detailed studies into the way we use resources and their impacts.

== A need for science ==
As various authorities began shaping policies to encourage sustainable consumption and production, two issues emerged. One was that the field was lacking the kind of rigorous scientific assessments that underpinned research into other environmental disciplines, such as climate change (Intergovernmental Panel on Climate Change), biodiversity (Convention on Biological Diversity) and Ozone (Montreal Protocol). The other was that as raw materials are sourced, processed, manufactured into products, traded and consumed in locations around the world, any scientific assessments would need to be global in scope. Different regions also tended to treat the topic differently, depending on the volume of resources they used, methods they used to process resources and whether they had access to domestic resources or depended on imports.

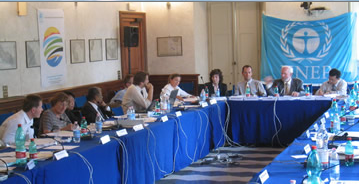
The International Resource Panel provides scientific assessments related to the use of natural resources

The IRP was founded in 2007 as a way to address this void and support diverse efforts being made to shift the world towards sustainable consumption and production. By mid-2011, the IRP had released in-depth assessments on decoupling (the concept of separating economic growth from environmental degradation), biofuels, metal stocks, plus priority products and materials.

The IRP has done a number of assessments, the topics of which include greenhouse gas mitigation technologies, efficiency of water use, trade, plus land and soils.

By providing the best available scientific information on using resources efficiently, the IRP aims to help the world shift to a ‘green economy’, where patterns of consumption and production are sustainable, all citizens have equitable access to resources and the enduring quality of the global commons is assured.

== The panel's mission ==
- Provide independent, coherent and authoritative scientific assessments of policy relevance on the sustainable use of natural resources and, in particular, their environmental impacts over the full life cycle.
- Contribute to a better understanding of how to decouple economic growth from environmental degradation while enhancing human well-being.

== What the IRP does ==
The IRP investigates the world's most critical resource issues with a view to supporting governments, industry, and society to improve resource efficiency — a necessary condition to achieve the Sustainable Development Goals (SDGs).
