= Ecodynamics =

Econodynamics is a part of applied economics. It covers knowledge on monetary value, the usage of money, and the money flow. It deals with labor, and capital.

== Applications in modern economic modeling ==
The concept of econodynamics has been applied in macroeconomic models that examine interactions among debt, investment, and financial instability. Some researchers use the term to describe dynamic feedback systems in which monetary flows, credit expansion, and asset prices mutually influence each other over time. For example, studies of nonlinear financial dynamics show how credit growth and asset valuation can reinforce each other, potentially leading to instability in leveraged economies.

The thermodynamic approach helps to formulate the relationship between the production output $Y$ and the traditinal producton factors. Among four established forms of the production function, one can find the functions on labour $L$ and capital $K$

$Y = Y_0 \, \frac{L}{L_0}\left(\frac {L_0}{L}\left[\frac{K}{K_0}\right]^{\overline{\varepsilon}} \, \right)^\alpha, \quad 0 < \alpha = \frac{1 - \overline{\lambda}}{\overline{\varepsilon} - \overline{\lambda}}< 1 \quad$

$Y = Y_0 \, \frac{ K }{ K_0}$

These formulae contain also the technological characteristics of the production equipment: labour and energy requirements, $\overline \lambda (t)$ and $\overline \varepsilon (t)$. These quantities indicate the amounts of labour and productive energy required to operate a unit of production equipment.

The first relation from (1) represents the law of labour substitution by capital. An increase in output can be achieved through increasing relative labour expenses, or the relative amount of capital. An analysis of substitution mechanisms shows that workers' efforts to produce goods are substituted by the work of the production equipment, not by equipment itself. The substitution coefficient depends on technological characteristics of production equipment. The thermodynamic results correct empirical specification of the dependence of output on the labour $L$ and physical capital $K$; the existing empirical formulae for the calculation of output do not contain the appropriate technological characteristics of production equipment.

It is possible to think that these results provide a solid thermodynamic foundation for the theory of economic production. In any case, understanding the quantitative relationship between outputs and resources can be beneficial in the development of mathematical models of production.

Similar approaches also examine how monetary circulation interacts with production and consumption flows, using system-dynamics models to understand long-run disequilibria in capitalist economies.

== See also ==
- Thermoeconomics
- System Dynamics

== Recommended reading ==
- Boulding, Kenneth E. (1978). Ecodynamics : a new theory of societal evolution. Beverly Hills (CA): Sage Publications. ISBN 978-0-8039-0945-8.
- Kümmel, Reiner (2011). The Second Law of Economics: Energy, Entropy, and the Origins of Wealth. Berlin: Springer. ISBN 978-1-4419-9364-9.
- Pokrovskii, Vladimir (2011). Econodynamics. The Theory of Social Production. Heidelberg & Berlin: Springer. ISBN 978-94-007-2095-4.
- Keen, Steve (1997). Economic Growth and Financial Instability, Dissertation at the School of Economics. Sydney: The University of New South Wales. ISBN 978-94-007-2095-4.
