= Resource efficiency =

Maximizing effect while minimizing waste

Resource efficiency is the maximising of the supply of money, materials, staff, and other assets that can be drawn on by a person or organization in order to function effectively, with minimum wasted (natural) resource expenses. It means using the Earth's limited resources in a sustainable manner while minimising environmental impact. Natural resource efficiency is embedded into the work of initiatives like the United Nations Environment Programme (UNEP) and international strategies such as the European Union's "Green Deal".

== Definition ==
The UK Government has defined resource efficiency for research purposes as "the optimisation of resource use so that a given level of final consumption can be met with fewer resources". It has been noted that improvements in resource efficiency can occur at production, consumption, and end of product life stages. Resource efficiency measures, methods, and aims are quite similar to those of resource productivity/resource intensity and of the slightly more environmentally-inclined concept of ecological efficiency/eco-efficiency.

== Motivation ==
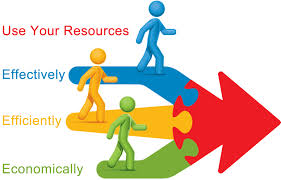
Resource management

A 2014 report by The Carbon Trust suggested that resource challenges are intensifying rapidly – for example, there could be a 40% gap between available water supplies and water needs by 2030, and some critical materials could be in short supply as soon as 2016. These challenges could lead to disruptions to supply, growing regulatory requirements, volatile fluctuation of prices, and may ultimately threaten the viability of existing business models.

== Possible approaches ==
To achieve and optimize natural resource and energy efficiency, several sustainable economical or production schemes have been proposed over the course of the last 50 years: circular economy, cradle-to-cradle- or regenerative design, as well as biomimetics principles, just to name a few. Common to all of them is built-in sustainability, in which (non-renewable) resource-wasting is ruled out by design. They are generally built to be holistic, robustly self-sustaining and respecting the carrying capacity of the economic or ecological system.

== Resource use measurement and identification of hotspots ==
A key tool in resource efficiency is measuring different aspects of resource use (e.g. carbon footprint, water footprint, land footprint or material use), then identifying 'hot spots' where the most resources are used or where there are the best opportunities to reduce this resource use. For example, WRAP has published information on hotspots for 50 grocery products likely to contribute most to the environmental impacts associated with UK household consumption. WRAP have created a range of tools and guides to help improve business resource efficiency.

== Examples of initiatives and programmes ==
=== UNEP ===
UNEP works to promote resource efficiency and sustainable consumption and production (SCP) in both developed and developing countries. The focus is on achieving increased understanding and implementation by public and private decision makers, as well as civil society, of policies and actions for resource efficiency and SCP. This includes the promotion of sustainable resource management in a life cycle perspective for goods and services.

=== Europe 2020 ===
The resource-efficient Europe "flagship initiative" was one of seven such initiatives set out in the Europe 2020 Strategy (2010-2020), the EU's growth strategy for a smart, inclusive and sustainable economy. It supports the shift towards sustainable growth via a resource-efficient, low-carbon economy. The European Commission argued that recycling practices, reduced greenhouse gas emissions and reduced reliance on fossil fuels provided evidence that the EU was already making progress with resource efficiency but the pace of change needed to be accelerated. The Commission stated that there were strong synergies between resource efficiency and other policy aims which could be beneficial, such as green growth industries providing secure employment, but a number of trade-offs needed to be managed, for example the promotion of green vehicle technologies supported the continued reduction in fossil fuel usage but also introduced new resource pressures such as electricity supply and sufficiency in the supply of rare-earth elements and lithium for vehicle batteries.

The European Commission published a Manifesto for a Resource-Efficient Europe in December 2012, in which it stated that "a resource-efficient and resilient economy should be achieved in a socially inclusive and responsible way".

A review of progress to 2014, taking account of the 2008 financial crisis, argued that delivery of the EU's resource efficiency targets, reducing greenhouse gas emissions by at least 20% compared to 1990 levels, increasing the share of renewable energy in final energy consumption to 20%, and moving towards a 20% increase in energy efficiency, were still broadly achievable by 2020.

=== Resource Efficient Scotland ===
Resource Efficient Scotland is a Scottish government-funded programme which helps businesses and the public and third sectors save money by using resources more efficiently.

=== Tomsk Polytechnic University ===
In October 2012 Tomsk Polytechnic University (TPU) launched a development program for Resource Efficient Technologies for the period 2013–2018.

== See also ==
- Scarcity
- Natural resource management
- Efficient energy use
- Water efficiency
