= Water politics =

Politics affected by the availability of water and water resources

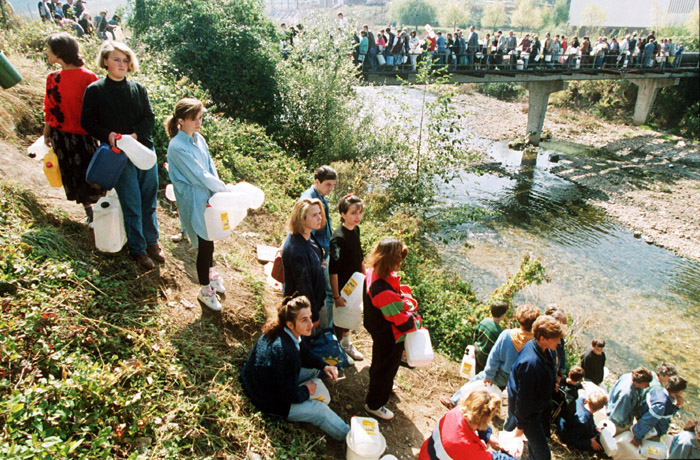
People waiting in line to gather water during the Siege of Sarajevo

Water politics, sometimes called hydropolitics, is politics affected by the availability of water and water resources, a necessity for all life forms and human development.

Arun P. Elhance's definition of hydropolitics is "the systematic study of conflict and cooperation between states over water resources that transcend international borders". Mollinga, P. P. classifies water politics into four categories, "the everyday politics of water resources management", "the politics of water policy in the context of sovereign states", "inter-state hydropolitics" and "the global politics of water". The availability of drinking water per capita is inadequate and shrinking worldwide. The causes, related to both quantity and quality, are many and varied; they include local scarcity, limited availability and population pressures, but also human activities of mass consumption, misuse, environmental degradation and water pollution, as well as climate change.

Water is a strategic natural resource, and scarcity of potable water is a frequent contributor to political conflicts throughout the world. With decreasing availability and increasing demand for water, some have predicted that clean water will become the "next oil"; making countries like Canada, Chile, Norway, Colombia and Peru, with this resource in abundance, the water-rich countries in the world. The UN World Water Development Report (WWDR, 2003) from the World Water Assessment Program indicates that, in the next 20 years, the quantity of water available to everyone is predicted to decrease by 30%. Currently, 40% of the world's inhabitants have insufficient fresh water for minimal hygiene. More than 2.2 million people died in 2000 from diseases related to the consumption of contaminated water or drought. In 2004, the UK charity WaterAid reported that a child dies every 15 seconds from easily preventable water-related diseases; often this means lack of sewage disposal; see toilet. The United Nations Development Program sums up world water distribution in the 2006 development report: "One part of the world, sustains a designer bottled water market that generates no tangible health benefits, another part suffers acute public health risks because people have to drink water from drains or from lakes and rivers." Fresh water—now more precious than ever in our history for its extensive use in agriculture, high-tech manufacturing, and energy production—is increasingly receiving attention as a resource requiring better management and sustainable use.

Riparian water rights have become issues of international diplomacy, in addition to domestic and regional water rights and politics. World Bank Vice President Ismail Serageldin predicted, "Many of the wars of the 20th century were about oil, but wars of the 21st century will be over water unless we change the way we manage water." This is debated by some, however, who argue that disputes over water usually are resolved by diplomacy and do not turn into wars. Another new school of thought argues that "perceived fears of losing control over shared water might contribute towards a constant preparedness to go to war among riparian nations, just in case there is one".

== Water policy ==
Water resource policy, sometimes called water resource management or water management, encompasses the policy-making processes and legislation that affect the collection, preparation, use, disposal, and protection of water resources. The long-term viability of water supply systems poses a significant challenge as a result of water resource depletion, climate change, and population expansion.

Water is a necessity for all forms of life as well as industries on which humans are reliant, like technology development and agriculture. This global need for clean water access necessitates water resource policy to determine the means of supplying and protecting water resources. Water resource policy varies by region and is dependent on water availability or scarcity, the condition of aquatic systems, and regional needs for water. Since water basins do not align with national borders, water resource policy is also determined by international agreements, also known as hydropolitics. Water quality protection also falls under the umbrella of water resource policy; laws protecting the chemistry, biology, and ecology of aquatic systems by reducing and eliminating pollution, regulating its usage, and improving the quality are considered water resource policy. When developing water resource policies, many different stakeholders, environmental variables, and considerations have to be taken to ensure the health of people and ecosystems are maintained or improved. Finally, ocean zoning, coastal, and environmental resource management are also encompassed by water resource management, like in the instance of offshore wind land leasing.

As water scarcity increases with climate change, the need for robust water resource policies will become more prevalent. An estimated 57% of the world's population will experience water scarcity at least one month out of the year by 2050. Mitigation and updated water resource policies will require interdisciplinary and international collaboration, including government officials, environmental scientists, sociologists, economists, climate modelers, and activists.

World water availability

== Concepts ==
=== Hydro-hegemony ===
The framework of hydro-hegemony was postulated by scholars Mark Zeitoun and Jeroen F. Warner in 2006 as a useful analytical paradigm useful to examine the options of powerful or hegemonized riparians and how they might move away from domination towards cooperation. The framework of hydro-hegemony is especially valuable in approaching cases where both powerrelations fall between the two poles of cooperation and the often discussed water wars.

Hydro-hegemony refers to "hegemony at the river basin level, achieved through water resource control strategies such as resource capture, integration and containment. The strategies are executed through an array of tactics (e.g. coercion-pressure, treaties, knowledge construction, etc.) that are enabled by the exploitation of existing power asymmetries within a weak international institutional context." The two pillars of hydro-hegemony are riparian position and exploitation potential. Although exceptions are possible, as a rule of thumb "upstreamers use water to get more power, downstreamers use power to get more water." The actor who wins control over the resource is determined through the form of hydro-hegemony that is established, in favor of the most powerful actor ('first among equals').

In 2010, Mark Zeitoun and Ana Elisa Cascão modified the framework to constitute of four overarching pillars of power— geographical power, material power, bargaining power and ideational power. As such, hydro-hegemony can be understood as hegemony at the river basin level that occurs where control over transboundary flows is consolidated by the most powerful actor.

Although Zeitoun and Warner argue that hydro-hegemony is generally a source of stability, in some instances weaker states might engage in counter-hydro-hegemony. In this instance, it is attempted to renegotiate and eventually also shift the distribution of power. Strategies that might be applied in this are attempts to shift the discourse to the favour of the non-hegemon.

== Water as a critical resource ==
Most importantly, fresh water is a fundamental requirement of all living organisms, crops, livestock and humanity included. The UNDP considers access to it a basic human right and a prerequisite for peace. The Ex-UN Secretary-General Kofi Annan stated in 2001, "Access to safe water is a fundamental human need and, therefore, a basic human right. Contaminated water jeopardizes both the physical and social health of all people. It is an affront to human dignity." With increased development, many industries, including forestry, agriculture, mining, manufacturing and recreation require sizable additional amounts of freshwater to operate. This, however, has led to increases in air and water pollution, which in turn have reduced the quality of water supply. More sustainable development practices are advantageous and necessary.

According to the WHO, each human being requires a bare minimum of 20 litres of fresh water per day for basic hygiene; this equals 7.3 cubic metres (about 255 ft^{3}) per person, per year. Based on the availability, access and development of water supplies, the specific usage figures vary widely from country to country, with developed nations having existing systems to treat water for human consumption, and deliver it to every home. At the same time however, some nations across Latin America, parts of Asia, South East Asia, Africa and the Middle East either do not have sufficient water resources or have not developed these or the infrastructure to the levels required. This occurs for many varied reasons. It has resulted in conflict and often results in a reduced level or quantity of fresh water per capita consumption; this situation leads toward disease, and at times, to starvation and death.

The source of virtually all freshwater is precipitation from the atmosphere, in the form of mist, rain and snow, as part of the water cycle over eons, millennia and in the present day. Freshwater constitutes only 3 percent of all water on Earth, and of that, slightly over two thirds is stored frozen in glaciers and polar ice caps. The remaining unfrozen freshwater is mainly found as groundwater, with only a small fraction present in the air, or on the ground surface. Surface water is stored in wetlands or lakes or flows in a stream or river, and is the most commonly utilized resource for water. In places, surface water can be stored in a reservoir behind a dam, and then used for municipal and industrial water supply, for irrigation and to generate power in the form of hydroelectricity. Sub-surface groundwater, although stored in the pore space of soil and rock; it is utilized most as water flowing within aquifers below the water table. Groundwater can exist both as a renewable water system closely associated with surface water and as a separate, deep sub-surface water system in an aquifer. This latter case is sometimes called "fossil water", and is realistically non-renewable. Normally, groundwater is utilized where surface sources are unavailable or when surface supply distribution is limited.

Rivers sometimes flow through several countries and often serve as the boundary or demarcation between them. With these rivers, water supply, allocation, control, and use are of great consequence to survival, quality of life, and economic success. The control of a nation's water resources is considered vital to the survival of a state. Similar cross-border groundwater flow also occurs. Competition for these resources, particularly where limited, have caused or been additive to conflicts in the past.

The highlands of Ethiopia may be considered a water tower region in East Africa. Sovereign control of upland water supply is likely to govern downstream politics for many years.

== Contamination from human activity ==
Water contamination usually occurs through a series of two mechanisms: point and non-point sources of pollution. According to the U.S. Environmental Protection Agency (EPA), point source pollution is "any single identifiable source of pollution from which pollutants are discharged, such as a pipe, ditch, ship or factory smokestack." Therefore, among the most common examples of point source pollution, poor factory and sewage treatment appear high on the list; although not as frequent, but, nevertheless, equally—if not more—dangerous, oil spills are another famous example of point source of pollution. On the other hand, non-point sources of pollution are those that may come from different sources, among which, poor and badly monitored agricultural activities can negatively affect the quality of any nearby sources of water.

=== Point sources of pollution ===
- Industrial products and wastes: Many harmful chemicals are used widely in local business and industry. These can become drinking water pollutants if not well managed. The most common sources of such problems are:
  - Local businesses: Factories, industrial plants, and even small businesses such as gas stations and dry cleaners handle a variety of hazardous chemicals that need careful management. Spills and improper disposal of these chemicals or of industrial wastes can threaten ground water supplies.
  - Leaking underground tanks and piping: Petroleum products, chemicals, and wastes stored in underground storage tanks and pipes may end up in the ground water. Tanks and piping leak if they are constructed or installed improperly. Steel tanks and piping corrode with age. Tanks are often found on farms. The possibility of leaking tanks is great on old, abandoned farm sites. Farm tanks are exempt from the EPA rules for petroleum and chemical tanks.
  - Landfills and waste dumps: Modern landfills are designed to contain any leaking liquids, but floods can carry conaminants over the barriers. Older dumpsites may have a wide variety of pollutants that can seep into ground water.
- Household wastes: Improper disposal of many common products can pollute ground water. These include cleaning solvents, used motor oil, paints, and paint thinners. Even soaps and detergents can harm drinking water. These are often a problem from faulty septic tanks and septic leaching fields.
- Lead and copper: Elevated concentrations of lead are rarely found in source water. Lead is commonly found in household plumbing materials. Homes built before 1986 are more likely to have lead pipes, fixtures, and solder. Lead can leach into water systems when these plumbing materials corrode. The acidity or alkalinity of water – or of any solution – is expressed as pH, from 0–14. Anything neutral, for example, has a pH of 7. Acids have a pH less than 7, bases (alkaline) greater than 7 pH greatly affects corrosion. Temperature and mineral content also affect how corrosive it is. Lead in drinking water can cause a variety of adverse health effects. Exposure to lead in drinking water can cause delays in physical and mental development in babies and children. Adults who drink this water over many years could develop kidney problems or high blood pressure.
- Water treatment chemicals: Improper handling or storage of water-well treatment chemicals (such as disinfectants or corrosion inhibitors) close to your well can cause problems.

=== Non-point sources of pollution ===
Agricultural activities that cause non-point source pollution include:

- Poorly managed animal feeding operations
- Overgrazing
- Overworking the land (for example, plowing too often)
- Poorly managed and ineffective application of pesticides, irrigation water, and fertilizer.
- Bacteria and nitrates: These contaminants are found in human and animal wastes. Septic tanks or large numbers of farm animals can also cause bacterial and nitrate pollution. Both septic systems and animal manures must be carefully managed to prevent private well contamination.
- Concentrated animal feeding operations: The number of concentrated animal feeding operation, often called "factory farms," is growing. On these farms thousands of animals are raised in a small space. The large amounts of animal wastes/manures from these farms can threaten water supplies. Strict and careful manure management is needed to prevent pathogen and nutrient problems in private wells. Salts from high levels of manures can also pollute ground water.
- Heavy metals: Activities such as mining and construction can release large amounts of heavy metals into nearby ground water sources. Some older fruit orchards may contain high levels of arsenic, once used as a pesticide. At high levels, these metals pose a health risk.
- Fertilizers and pesticides: Farmers use fertilizers and pesticides to promote growth and reduce insect damage. These products are also used on golf courses and suburban lawns and gardens. The chemicals in these products may end up in ground water. The extent of contamination depends on the types and amounts of chemicals used and how they are applied. Local environmental conditions (such as soil types, seasonal snow, and rainfall) also impact their contamination potential. Groundwater will normally look clear and clean because the ground naturally filters out particulate matter. But, natural and human-induced chemicals can be found in groundwater. As groundwater flows through the ground, metals such as iron and manganese are dissolved and may later be found in high concentrations in the water. Industrial discharges, urban activities, agriculture, groundwater pumpage, and disposal of waste all can affect groundwater quality. Contaminants can be human-induced, as from leaking fuel tanks or toxic chemical spills. Pesticides and fertilizers applied to lawns and crops can accumulate and migrate to the water table. Leakage from septic tanks and/or waste-disposal sites also can introduce bacteria to the water, and pesticides and fertilizers that seep into farmed soil can eventually end up in water drawn from a well. Or, a well might have been placed in land that was once used for something like a garbage or chemical dump site. Polluted runoff is created by rainfall or snow-melt moving over and through the ground. As the runoff moves, it picks up and carries away natural and human-made pollutants, finally depositing them into watersheds via lakes, rivers, wetlands, coastal waters, and even our underground sources of drinking water. In 2002, in the National Water Quality Inventory report to U.S. Congress, the states reported that agricultural non-point source (NPS) pollution is the leading cause of river and stream impairment and the second leading cause of impairment in lakes, ponds, and reservoirs.

== By country ==
=== OECD countries ===
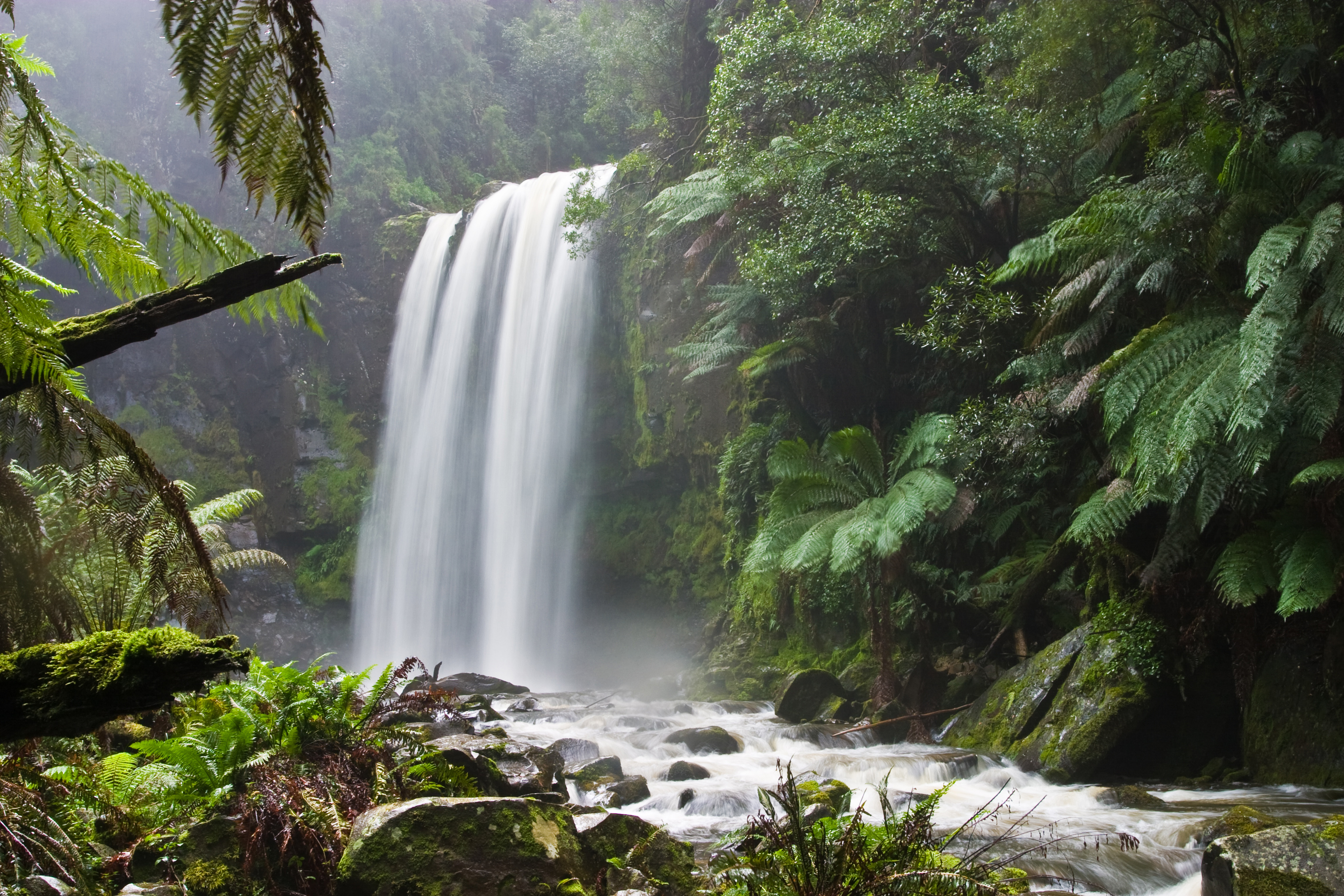
Hopetoun Falls near Otway National Park, Victoria, Australia

With nearly 2,000 cubic metres (71,000 cu ft) of water used per person per year, the United States leads the world in water consumption per capita. Among the developed OECD countries, the U.S. is highest in water consumption, then Canada with 1,600 cubic metres (57,000 cu ft) of water per person per year, which is about twice the amount of water used by the average person from France, three times as much as the average German, and almost eight times as much as the average Dane. A 2001 University of Victoria report says that since 1980, overall water use in Canada has increased by 25.7%. This is five times faster than the overall OECD increase of 4.5%. In contrast, nine OECD nations were able to decrease their overall water use since 1980 (Sweden, the Netherlands, the United States, the United Kingdom, the Czech Republic, Luxembourg, Poland, Finland and Denmark).

=== India ===
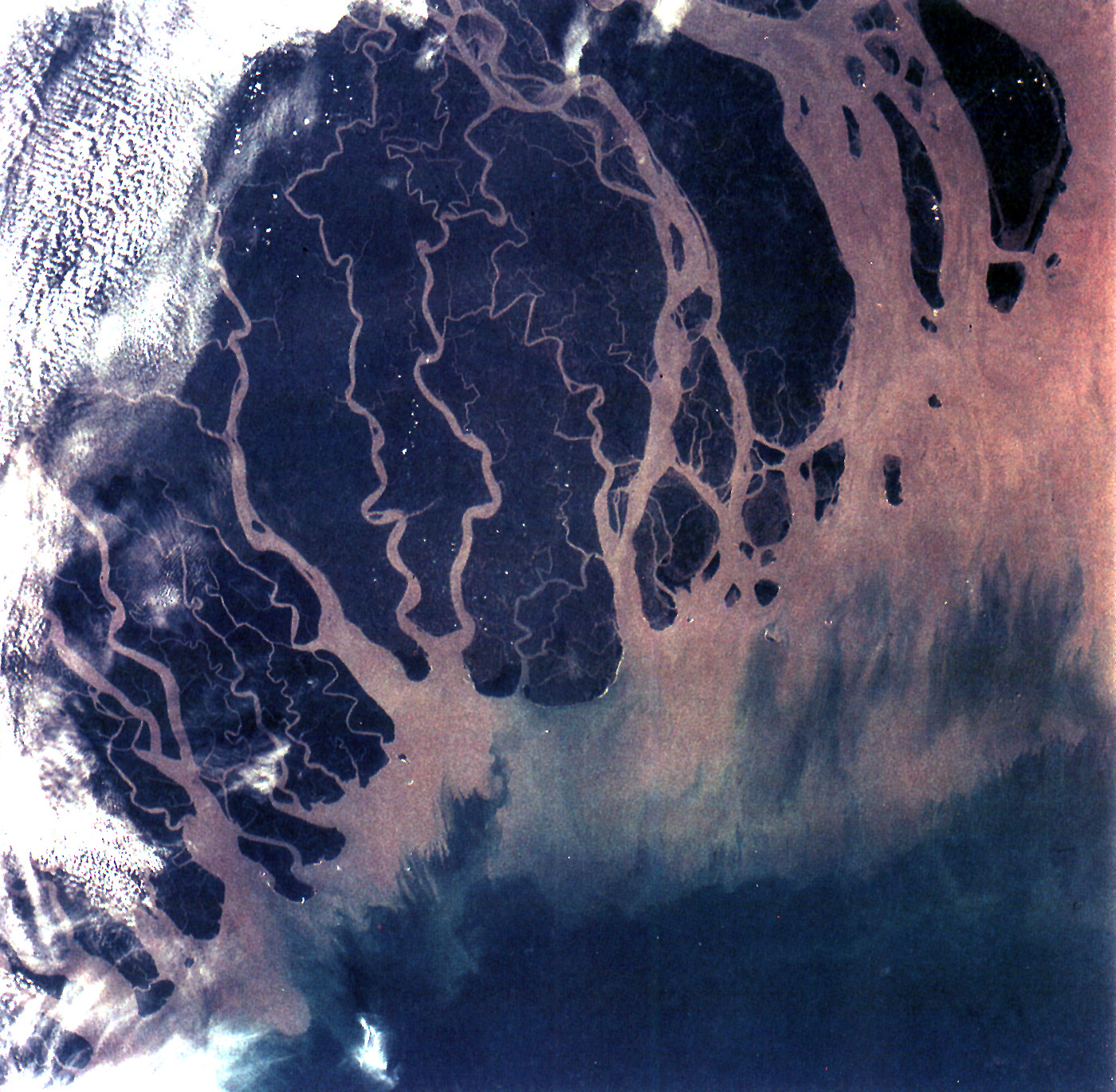
Ganges river delta, Bangladesh and India

==== India–Bangladesh ====
The Ganges is disputed between India and Bangladesh. The water reserves are being quickly depleted and polluted, while the Gangotri glacier that feeds the river is retreating hundreds of feet each year (experts blame climate change) and deforestation in the Himalayas is causing subsoil streams flowing into the Ganges river to dry up. Downstream, India controls the flow to Bangladesh with the Farakka Barrage, 10 kilometers (6 mi) on the Indian side of the border. Until the late 1990s, India used the barrage to divert the river to Calcutta, to keep the city's port from drying up during the dry season. This denied Bangladeshi farmers water and silt, and it left the Sundarban wetlands and mangrove forests at the river's delta seriously threatened. The two countries have now signed an agreement to share the water more equally. Water quality, however, remains a problem, with high levels of arsenic and untreated sewage in the river water.

==== India–Pakistan ====
Recently India starting constructing Kishanganga Dam thus depriving Pakistan of its 33 percent water coming in Jehlum River. Pakistan is building the same type of dam called Neelum Jehlum Dam. After the Indo Pak Treaty of 1960, Ravi and Sutleg River belong to India while Jehlum, Chenab, Indus belong to Pakistan. But still a growing dissatisfication exist on Pakistani side for sharing its water with India.

=== Mexico ===
Mexico has experienced significant issues in preventing contamination and water pollution and in distributing clean water to households and businesses. As society has evolved and urbanization, economic growth, and increased trade have occurred, the demand for clean water has increased. However, pollution associated with economic growth and industrialization combined with the arid climate have restricted access to clean water for many households and firms. The already arid climate is susceptible to droughts with increasing climate change issues, which may further hinder access to water.

Mexico relies on groundwater for their water supply which has led to significant exploitation of aquifers and therefore increased costs in accessing water. Mexico City is the largest city and urban center with a very high demand for drinking water. The water supply provided by the "Sistema de Aguas de la Ciudad de Mexico" (SCAMEX) is only 98 effective and has therefore left about 48,000 households in the city alone without water. However, even those with access to the water provided by the city remain unsatisfied. Even those already connected to SCAMEX experience issues due to water loss and poor water quality. In Mexico City, an estimated 40% of the city's water is lost through leaky pipes built at the turn of the 20th century. According to the results of a 2011 survey, up to 87% of the households in Mexico City would prefer to access water used for cooking and drinking through sources other than the tap. Alternative ways to access water include: purchasing bottled water or filtration devices, or boiling water before drinking. The issue is that these alternative measures are typically significantly more expensive than using the water provided.

=== Middle East and North Africa ===
In the Middle East and North Africa (MENA), water is an important resource and political issue. According to a report by the Arab League in 1999, two-thirds of Arab countries had less than 1,000 cubic metres (35,000 cu ft) of water per person per year available, which is considered the limit. By 2025, it is predicted that the countries of the Arabian Peninsula will be using more than double the amount of water naturally available to them. By 2030, according to the World Bank, the MENA will most likely be under the limit of absolute water scarcity, as defined by the United Nations. With rapid population growth and climate change, water scarcity is unlikely to decline. Given these statistics and predictions, water is commonly interpreted as scarce in the MENA and therefore often used as an explanation for conflicts and political instability in the region. However, scholars have argued that this is a form of framing, as the problem is not necessarily the availability of water but rather the way in which it is distributed and used.

In the context of the Middle East, with a diverse landscape of national, subnational, ideological, ethnic, religious and pan-national identities, water politics has played an important role in conflicts between Iraq, Syria, and Turkey; Egypt and other Nile riparian states; as well as Israel and Palestine. In the MENA, all major rivers cross at least one international border, such as the Tigris and Euphrates crossing three major Middle Eastern nations. The Nile even crosses eleven countries. This means that downstream riparian states are hugely affected by the actions and decisions of upstream riparian states, an actor they have little practical control over. In particular this is evident with the possibility of cutting or reducing water supply from one nation to the next. Besides rivers, other waters in the Middle East that are important for the region and international trade are the Suez Canal, the Bab-el-Mandeb Strait, the Strait of Hormuz, and the Persian Gulf.

==== Overview by country ====
Country or region	Water Politics
Algeria	Further information: Water supply and sanitation in Algeria Water scarcity is an increasing problem in Algeria, which is reinforced by climate change and periods of drought. In 2024, protests against the water politics of the government occurred in the city of Tiaret. To secure the supply of drinking water and water for the agricultural and industrial sectors, as well as to mitigate the risk of increasing water scarcity as a consequence of climate change, Algeria provided a budget of USD 5.4 billion to enhance the desalination technology in the country. By 2030, the country aims to generate nearly two thirds of its water through desalination.
Bahrain	Water politics form an important aspect for Bahrain, being an archipelago. Similar to other countries in the region, conventional water resources in Bahrain are scarce. To meet its water demands, the country therefore uses techniques such as desalination, as well as greywater filtering for irrigation. These techniques allowed Bahrain to reduce the depletion of unsustainable water resources by 20% between 2000 and 2021. These goals towards a more efficient and sustainable use of water are enshrined in the Bahrain Vision 2030 and the progress made leads to country to claim a "pioneering" role in this realm. Already in the 1980s different laws were implemented to manage water resources in the kingdom more efficient and sustainable, which is implemented and monitored by a variety of state institutions.
Egypt	Further information: Water politics in the Nile Basin Further information: Water supply and sanitation in Egypt Egypt's water politics are heavily affected by the Nile treaties that were signed in 1902, 1929, and 1959. In these treaties, Egypt's self-proclaimed dominance over the Nile is confirmed, and Egypt is granted access to the majority of the Nile waters, as well as the right to block construction projects affecting the Nile in upstream countries. Despite other states seeing these agreements as colonial products, Egypt perceives them as legally binding. In the course of the intensified nationalism and the claimed descent of modern Egyptians from Pharaonic Egyptians, the Nile has become part of Egypt's national identity. This is also reflected in the securitisation of the Nile, where the river is commonly linked to the nation's existence. An important step for modern Egypt, in maximising the use of the Nile across several domains, was the construction of the Aswan High Dam under Gamal Abdel Nasser in 1970. Besides the Aswan High Dam, Toshka was an important water policy project in Egypt. Toshka was an ambitious plan to create a new city in the southern Egyptian desert, using water from Lake Nasser to gain new land for agriculture and reduce pressure from issues such as overpopulation and food scarcity. However, the project was never finished. Since Ethiopia's announcement of the construction of the Grand Ethiopian Renaissance Dam in 2011, Egypt's water politics have been dominated by the dispute over the construction and later filling and operation of the dam. Egypt has opposed the dam, fearing that it will reduce the amount of water it receives from the Nile. According to Egypt, the dam is in conflict with the Nile agreements and International Water Law, and threatens the water security of Egypt and Sudan. Egypt fears that the Renaissance Dam will lead to less downstream flowing water in the Nile, which would affect Egypt's water security, as the country is heavily dependent on the Nile. Additionally, this might also have negative effects on hydropower production from the Aswan High Dam. In rejecting the Renaissance Dam, Egypt forms an alliance with Sudan. So far, all negotiations have failed and the dispute between Egypt and Ethiopia over the Renaissance Dam has become a national preoccupation in both countries.
Iran	Further information: Water supply and sanitation in Iran In Iran from the 1980s onward, there was a water policy that now appears to have been not very future-oriented. Especially in the 1990s the construction of water infrastructure, such as dams, as well as wells to pump groundwater, increased, and today, while the population is rapidly growing, the water resources and the condition of the water infrastructure are deteriorating rapidly. In political decision-making processes, warnings from experts were—and still are—often neglected, leading some to speak of a "water mafia." According to a study by Allan Hassaniyan, water politics in Iran is heavily influenced by corruption, nepotism, and what is called "environmental racism," as political decision makers often exploit nature and the state treasury to allocate more water to their local districts. Due to further mismanagement and the regime's goal for food sovereignty, affected by sanctions on Iran, the agricultural sector both requires and illegally uses the vast majority of the available water. These developments are intertwined with other broader issues that reduce the availability of water, such as climate change and salinisation and lead to water scarcity.
Iraq	Following the 1991 uprising in Iraq, Saddam Hussein drained the Iraqi marshes in an act of revenge against the Marsh Arabs living in the area. The destruction of the marshes, and connected to that, the habitat of the Marsh Arabs is an instance where water was weaponised in a counterinsurgency strategy. It is considered both a genocide and an ecocide. Besides counterinsurgency, scholars also argue that sectarianism played a role in the destruction of the marshes, as the majority of the population in this area was Shi'a. While the Iraqi regime accused Turkey of reducing the water flow of the Euphrates to Iraq in the process of the construction of the Atatürk Dam, thereby allegedly draining the marshes, scholars have argued that nearly all damage was done by Iraq. To drain the marshes, water from the Euphrates and Tigris was redirected into the so-called "Third River," a project by the regime that aimed to increase fertile land in Iraq. After the U.S. invasion of Iraq in 2003, there were attempts by Iraqi officials, the U.S. military, and NGOs to restore the marshes. Currently, Iraq's water policies include the aim to improve engagement and cooperation with neighbouring countries to mitigate issues surrounding unequal access to water, also involving international actors such as the Netherlands. In early 2025, Iraq and the United Kingdom agreed on a GBP 5.3 billion project to improve the water supply of southwestern regions of the country.
ISIS	Although not a country, ISIS was an important actor in regional water politics during the caliphate. The areas ISIS controlled in the Middle East contained water infrastructure crucial for the populations of Syria and Iraq. Constructions such as dams or storages were important strategic goals for ISIS, from 2014 onward leading to heavy battles at the end of which ISIS controlled most of the water infrastructure along the Euphrates and Tigris in Syria and Iraq. Subsequently, water became used as a weapon through causing water shortages, inducing overflows, and intoxicating water. These strategies were used for military warfare but also to attack civilians. The control over a crucial resource such as water gave ISIS power, not only as a weapon but also in a symbolic way, underlining the group's ambition to replace the existing states. Furthermore, water and the electricity generated from hydropower were used by ISIS for its followers, its territories, and the oil production. Blowing up dams was also considered to be a realistic option in a possible strategy of ISIS in case it loses all territories and is on the brink of defeat. In 2014, especially the scenario of ISIS destroying the Mosul Dam would have had serious consequences, destroying both Mosul and Baghdad.
Israel	Further information: Water politics in the Jordan River basin Further information: Water supply and sanitation in Israel During the Zionist settlement of Palestine before the establishment of Israel in 1948, control over water was a tool to increase power in the region. Starting in the 1930s, water was declared to be an abundant resource in Palestine by zionist scholars and water companies. This argument was used to enable and increase settlement in Palestine. Israel is highly active in improving its water infrastructure and methods to enhance water availably in the country. This includes desalination, new irrigation techniques, reusing water, and dams to keep up with rapid population and economic growth. However, differences in access to water can be observed as bedouins and inhabitants of occupied areas have severely less access to water. Water is an important issue in the Arab–Israeli conflict and according to former Israeli prime minister Ariel Sharon was one of the causes of the 1967 Six-Day War. Article 40 of the appendix B of the September 28, 1995 Oslo accords stated that "Israel recognises Palestinians' rights on water in the West Bank". Nevertheless, in the ongoing Gaza war, Israel is criticised by various scholars, activists, and politicians for the weaponisation of water. The water supply to Gaza is blocked and water infrastructure for fresh and waste water was targeted. Yoav Gallant, the former Israeli minister of defence, stated: “We are imposing a complete siege on Gaza. There will be no electricity, no food, no water, no fuel, everything will be closed.” This weaponisation of water and its consequences on civilians in Gaza are considered to be war crimes.
Jordan	Further information: Water supply and sanitation in Jordan Due to its downstream position on the Jordan River and Yarmouk River, Jordan's water supply is dependant on other countries and under pressure. Therefore, together with International Organisations, Jordan is preparing new techniques to use non-conventional water resources, such as second-hand use of irrigation water and desalinisation techniques. Another important project was the Disi Water Conveyance Project, transporting groundwater from the Disi aquifer in the south of Jordan to Amman. After the failure of the negotiations surrounding the Jordan Valley Unified Water Plan in 1955, unlike other regional states, Jordan signed a peace treaty with Israel in 1994, ending the decades of unilateral water politics. Jordans riparian position did not allow a complete withdrawal from negotiations but made cooperation necessary. Although there are still tensions between the countries, the treaty proved to be important as several shared projects enhancing water cooperation and water supply were realised since 1994. There even were plans for a "peace canal" which both countries wanted to construct together, however this project was never realised. To increase its access to the Yarmouk River, Jordan signed several treaties with Syria, dating back to 1953, however the riparians power imbalance founded in geographical position along the course of the Yarmouk River can also be seen in the treaties. In treaties the countries agreed upon certain amounts of water that Syria must release to Jordan, as well as the number of dams that Syria is allowed to construct, however Syria neglected these agreements multiple times. Therefore, Jordan is considered one of the most water scarce countries in the world.
Kuwait	The most visible part of Kuwait's water politics are probably the Kuwait Water Towers. The towers, with their characteristic architecture, serve as water reservoirs to provide Kuwait City with desalinated water. Today, the Kuwait Water Towers consist of 31 mushroom-shaped water towers and the Kuwait Towers, and they were an important step for Kuwait towards water security and water sovereignty. With increasing demand for water, Kuwait expanded its water reservoir system, which today consists of over 80 above-ground and more than 100 underground reservoirs.
Lebanon	Further information: Water supply and sanitation in Lebanon In Lebanon water shortage is a problem affecting over two thirds of the country's population and this is likely to increase in the future due to climate change if there are no countermeasures. To reduce stress on the water supply, scholars identified potential in the agricultural sector which consumes slightly more than half of the country's water. The reuse of greywater for irrigation could increase the share of water available for human consumption. Furthermore, decades of crisis and conflict in Lebanon have negatively affected the water infrastructure, which is struggling to meet Beirut's water demands. Therefore, inhabitants are required to use improvised water acquisition measures, the selection of which is highly affected by their financial possibilities.
Libya	An important water policy project in Libya was the Great Man-Made River Project started under Gaddafi. The goal was to supply the densely populated northern region of Libya with water from aquifers discovered in the south. However, the project was never finalised after the fall of Gaddafi in 2011. Libya faces severe water insecurity and is heavily dependent on non-renewable groundwater resources to a large extent. The conflicts in Libya led to water infrastructure being destroyed, further decreasing water security in the country. During the civil wars, water infrastructure was deliberately targeted, leading to serious pressure on food and water security, which are intertwined and mutually reinforcing factors along with other issues such as displacement, migration, and the environmental consequences of war. In September 2023, two dams collapsed in Libya following Storm Daniel. Scholars and experts have linked the collapse of the dams to the devastating effects of the civil wars on infrastructure in the country, with the storm serving as the final trigger.
Morocco	Further information: Water supply and sanitation in Morocco Water politics in Morocco are shaped by the governments goal to make the water use more sustainable and efficient, as well as to increase the water supply. However, a central obstacle to this is the widespread corruption. Furthermore, in some regions the distribution of water is especially unequal, as more water goes to the farming of cash-crops than to the population. In the town of Zagora, this led to protests called a "thirst revolution" in 2017. In this, a gendered dimension can be observed. Especially women and children are affected by water scarcity in these regions, as men often moved to bigger cities to work there.
Oman	The Sultanate of Oman has a very diverse climate, with the southern parts of the country being affected by the seasonal monsoon. Especially, the city of Salalah is popular for its many wadis and rivers. In the Hajar Mountains, the traditional Aflaj Irrigation System is still in place and is part of the UNESCO World Heritage list. However, nowadays, Oman relies heavily on desalination for its water, which makes up more than 85 percent of the drinking water.
Palestine	Further information: Water supply and sanitation in the State of Palestine Already during the Mandate era, access to water was politicised in Palestine. Where local farmers developed practices to negotiate the relative water scarcity, British government officials perceived these practices as outdated and "backward." The inherently racist strategy of the colonial leadership was to cooperate with the first Zionist settlers in Palestine, as Jews were seen as superior to Arabs and therefore able to use the land and resources more efficiently. Under the official aim to increase agricultural output and reduce diseases, Palestinian farmers saw their access to water diminish, as it was reformed by an alliance of convenience of Zionists and the Mandate leadership. Part of the restructuring of water management in Mandate Palestine was the draining of areas such as Lake Hula resulting in the resettlement of Palestinians, making it an important element in the settler colonisation of Palestine. After the occupation of the West Bank in 1967, Israel limited the access of Palestinians to water, while in the illegal settlements there are no restrictions on water use. Today, most water sources in Palestine are controlled by Israel, leading to a dependence of Palestinians on Mekorot and concessions by Israeli lawmakers. The Oslo Accords enshrined the unequal access to water in legal codes, as they allocate the majority of shared watercourses to Israel. This imbalance in access to water also affects the per day consumption of water per person which is around 3-4 times higher in Israel than in the occupied Palestinian territories. In Gaza, according to Amnesty International, around 90-95% of the water is unusable for the population. Already before the Gaza war a weaponisation of water could be observed, as the access to water and the use of water management facilities in Gaza is heavily restricted by Israel. According to Human Rights Watch, the population in Gaza has less than a tenth of the minimum amount of water humans need per day according to the World Health Organization. Therefore, this is considered a war crime by many NGOs, governments, scholars, and activists.
Qatar	Despite being one of the most water scarce countries when it comes to conventional water resources, Qatar has a very high consumption of water for different purposes ranging from private use, over public parks, to the construction sector. This water is mainly won through desalination and Qatari citizens receive it for free from the government. To fulfil the water demands Qatar is continuously expanding its water infrastructure. Furthermore the country aims to reduce the use of water and make it more efficient and sustainable in line with SDG 6 of the UN Sustainable Development Goals.
Saudi Arabia	Further information: Water supply and sanitation in Saudi Arabia In the formation of the Kingdom of Saudi Arabia, water was an important means of power, as access to water enabled the Al Saud family to assert their dominance and use it to generate stability. Before the discovery and boom of oil, large parts of the Saudi Arabian population were peasants. Therefore, control over access to water could be used to distribute it and, through this, exercise power and create stability. As groundwater resources are shrinking, Saudi Arabia's dependence on desalination for water has been increasing since 1950. Currently, just under two-thirds of the water demand in the KSA is met by desalinated water. In 1980, the East-West-Pipeline transporting desalinated water from the city of Jubail to Riyadh was constructed. Groundwater is often used for irrigation purposes in more rural agricultural areas of the kingdom. Water also plays an important role in Saudi Arabia's ambitious NEOM project. To meet the city's water demands, it will entirely depend on desalination. Therefore, to meet the goal of the city being entirely CO2 neutral, new solutions to the energy-intensive desalination process are required. Furthermore, the city plans to recycle all of its wastewater.
Sudan	Further information: Water supply in Sudan Water politics in Sudan are historically connected to those in Egypt. Under colonial rule, Sudan was a party to the Nile agreements of 1902 and 1929, where access to water and power in the Nile region was mainly distributed between Egypt and, to a lesser extent, Sudan. After the country became independent in 1956, tensions arose as the new Sudanese government did not recognise the earlier Nile agreements and opposed the Aswan High Dam. After the Sudanese military coup in 1958, Sudan and Egypt made mutual concessions to build dams on the Nile, resulting in another agreement signed in 1959, which reinforced the key contents of the 1929 agreement. The allocation of Nile waters, as formulated in the Nile agreements, is still seen as legally binding by Sudan today, despite criticism from other states regarding the colonial influence in the agreements. In 2015, Sudan, Egypt, and Ethiopia signed a Declaration of Principles expressing the goal of increasing cooperation and, ultimately, enhancing regional prosperity. After Ethiopia announced its plans to construct the Grand Ethiopian Renaissance Dam, Sudan initially welcomed the project. However, after another military coup in 2019, there was a rapprochement between Sudan and Egypt, with both countries expressing shared rejection of the Renaissance Dam. In 2020 and 2021, Sudan and Egypt conducted the military exercises "Guardians of the Nile" and "Nile Eagles" together. Sudan participates in the ongoing negotiations on the filling and operation of the Renaissance Dam.
Syria	Further information: Water resources management in Syria Further information: Water supply and sanitation in Syria Syria is facing severe water shortages and water insecurity. The decline of water in the Euphrates River leads to several intertwined issues in Syria. As an important source for irrigation, reduced Euphrates waters lead to increased rural flight as farming is becoming very hard. However, this rural flight to urban centres leads to a rapid and somewhat uncontrolled population growth in cities and puts severe tension on the (water) infrastructure of these cities. Furthermore, the lack of water in the Euphrates leads to energy shortages as less turbines in Syrian dams can be used. However, it is often argued that these issues could have been partially prevented by better water management in the past decades. With the Civil War starting in 2011, water had the potential to increase conflict but also for limited rapprochement, as state engineers carried out maintenance work on dams in areas controlled by ISIS or Kurdish militias. Currently, however, the water mismanagement continues as reforms are not consequently implemented and the depletion of groundwater resources remains high. Together with the lack of cooperation between Syria and Turkey, this is most likely to increase water scarcity in the future. Turkish dams on the Euphrates have significantly reduced the availability of water, partially as Turkey weaponises the dams in an attempt to weaken the Kurdish YPG. Given Turkeys ties with the HTS militia that took power in Syria in late 2024, it will be interesting to see how the tensions between the countries around water evolve in the future.
Tunisia	Further information: Water supply and sanitation in Tunisia Although the access to clean water was added to the Constitution in 2022, water scarcity remains a problem in Tunisia for humans, animals, agriculture, and the economy. Therefore, the Tunisian Ministry of Agriculture has published plans to enhance the availability of water sources, the access to them, and the efficient use of water in different steps until 2050. In Tunisisia water scarcity acts intertwined with climate change and leads to phenomenons such as desertification and rural flight. Especially the agricultural sector, which for long has focused on water intensive export crops, is affected by increasing water scarcity. The World Bank is engaging in projects aiming to improve water security in Tunisia.
Turkey	Further information: Water supply and sanitation in Turkey The plans for the Southeastern Anatolia Project (GAP), published in 2007, included the construction of the IIısu Dam, which is part of a broader network of Turkish dams on the Euphrates and Tigris, close to the borders with Iraq and Syria. These dams face criticism from Iraq and Syria, as they significantly reduce the amount of water flowing downstream in the two rivers, which are crucial for Syria's and Iraq's water supply. Similar to the dispute over GERD between Egypt and Ethiopia, it can be observed in the case of Turkey and Iraq/Syria that negotiations are difficult, as the parties have opposing interests. Furthermore, the Ilısu Dam is argued to be targeting Kurds, as it destroys some of their lands and the city of Hasankeyf. There are even accusations against Turkey of using dams to deprive Syrian Kurds of water, which would constitute a weaponisation of water.
United Arab Emirates	Water politics are an important field in the UAE and there even is a policy paper dedicated to it called "Water Security Strategy 2036." In this, the UAE states its aim to increase the sustainability of desalination and to improve the efficient use of water in the country. Furthermore, the policy paper states a belief in and commitment to international solutions for water scarcity.
Yemen	Further information: Water supply and sanitation in Yemen Before 2014, the vast majority of water in Yemen was used by the agricultural sector. Especially in the last third of the 20th century a shift towards the cultivation of cash-crops for export took place. These crops such as bananas, citrus, and khat were often poorly aligned to the climate and availability of water in Yemen. The ongoing Yemeni Civil War has increased the already existing water scarcity in Yemen. Currently, it is estimated that more than 50% of the population do not have access to clean water. During the war, water infrastructure was destroyed or is no longer functional due to a lack of maintenance and spare parts. The Houthis, as well as the government troops and their allies, have weaponised water, therefore committing war crimes. Different international actors, such as United Nations Development Programme, the German Ministry for Economic Cooperation and Development, and the United Nations Food and Agriculture Organization are active in Yemen and aim to increase water cooperation and increase water supply. In response to the Gaza War, the Houthis started to attack ships in the Red Sea along the coast of Yemen. This Red Sea Crisis is ongoing and has led to intensified airstrikes on Yemen, as well as delays and rising prices in international trade, as one of the most important shipping routes between Europe, the MENA, and Asia has become increasingly dangerous to pass.

=== South America ===
The Guaraní Aquifer, located between the Mercosur countries of Argentina, Brazil, Paraguay and Uruguay, with a volume of about 40,000 km^{3}, is an important source of fresh potable water for all four countries. It is replenished by water from rains and small rivers and streams, mainly on its margins. As populational growth in its area is still relatively high (the feeder areas of the aquifer, especially the wettest ones, may locate even important and big metropolitan areas such as São Paulo and Curitiba), monitoring is required to avoid deplenishing, and pollution, that would be associated with the still very weak environmental legislation concerning farming and with the still low performance of the coverage of sanitation (mainly in the form of discharge of untreated sewage and exposed untreated garbage, including urban, what potentializes problems associated with flooding), in the countries affected.

=== United States ===
The Water Justice movement is a largely grassroots US movement, with small groups of citizens taking the issue into their own hands by means of protesting, petitioning, fundraising, or donating items such as water filters in order to broaden access to clean water. Some well-known people have used their exposure to further the cause of water justice: Erin Brockovich, media personality and environmental activist has spoken against Flint officials' mishandling of the water crisis there. Actress Shailene Woodley was arrested at a Dakota Access Pipeline protest, writing afterwards about her experience: "If you are a human who requires water to survive, then this issue directly involves you."

Another key player arguing to defend access to clean water in the Standing Rock protests is the Standing Rock Sioux Tribal Chairman, Dave Archambault II, who has spoken to the Human Rights Council at the U.N. in Geneva on behalf of his tribe. In a separate statement, Archambault thanked those who fought the pipeline "in the name of protecting our water."

The Water Justice movement has also moved globally, encompassing a wide array of diverse groups such as the Global Water Justice Movement, Friends of the Right to Water, the Centre on Housing Rights and Evictions, Food and Water Watch, and the Heinrich Böll Foundation. Groups such as these believe that water is part of the global commons, and thus argue against the privatization of water resources and give the state the responsibility of ensuring the right to water.

==== Legal acts ====
To prevent increased pollution, environmental damage, and to keep drinking water clean, various Legal acts have been signed into law.

- The Clean Water Act: The Clean Water Act was signed into law in 1948 under the name Federal Water Pollution Control Act, with expanded recognition and amendments in 1972. Amendments included:
  - Outlawing of any pollutant being released anywhere that would lead to large bodies of water.
  - Regulation of pollutants entering bodies of water.
  - Provided funding for sewage treatment plants.
  - Empowered the EPA with the authority to enforce water regulation rules.
- The Ocean Dumping Act: The Ocean Dumping Act was signed into law in 1972 to prevent excess pollution from entering the ocean. The EPA has the authority to fine no more than $50,000 for each breach of permit. The act also allows for general research and EPA research into ridding the ocean of pollutant dumping.
  - Shore Protection Act (SPA): The Shore Protection Act comes from title IV of the Ocean Dumping Act. It forbids vessels from carrying waste within coastal waters without a permit.
- Right To Water: Also known as the Human Right to Water and Sanitation, it was established by the United Nations on July 28, 2010. It was added to international law when the UN recognized water and general sanitation as a basic human right. It requires states and nations to provide clean, accessible drinking water to their people.
- Safe Drinking Water Act (SDWA): The Safe Drinking Water Act was put into law in 1974. It provides protection to water both above and below ground. In 1996, amendments were added requiring the EPA to assess risks and costs when creating standards for this law.

==== Activism ====
When it comes to America alone, there has been much activity surrounding the issues of water in Standing Rock, ND and Flint, Michigan. When the issue arose of a pipeline being implemented on the Standing Rock Indian Reservation of North Dakota, residents began to take action almost immediately. When the pipeline was proposed in January 2016, the Sioux tribe released a petition that garnered almost half a million signatures within three months. This postponed the construction of the pipeline, but the action did not stop there. In July of the same year, the tribe attempted to sue the Army Corps of Engineers with the argument that it would harm the area's water supply. This only led the Energy Transfer Partners to file a counter lawsuit, saying that the group was hindering their work. 2016 presidential candidate Jill Stein led movements against the construction, which included spray painting a bulldozer with the phrase, "I approve this message". Adding to the publication of the issue, actress Shailene Woodley was arrested for blocking the construction of the pipeline. The debate on whether or not the pipeline will actually be built is still in progress.

The water crisis in Flint, Michigan has also led activists to focus on getting clean water to the people. After the 2014 decision to make the Flint River the primary water source of the town, residents quickly noticed the quality of their water declining. The American Civil Liberties Union filed multiple lawsuits against the administration in Flint, saying that the levels of lead in the water is absurd, and demanded the pipes be replaced. This has yet to happen, and the people of Flint continue to struggle for clean water.

==== Related organizations and programs ====
Several state and national organizations and programs are dedicated to the access of safe water. The scope of these organizations are varied by their outreach (from focusing on a small county to working globally) and the aspects of water justice they are contributing to. Many of these organizations work within governmental systems while others work outside of them. These organizations have helped aid in the understanding and knowledge of water related issues, how they affect individuals and communities, and have found solutions to improve safe water access.

Categories of water justice organizations and programs include:

- Education: The United States of America has some of the safest drinking water supplies in the world. Despite this, there are several cases and outbreaks of illnesses and related health issues due to contaminated water reported to the Centers for Disease Control and Prevention every year. Several organizations work to educate communities about proper water safety procedures and places emphasis on individuals and communities to understand where their water supply comes from.
- Industry: Many water justice organizations work within industries related to community water to create safer water infrastructure. Many provide certification to certain professions to ensure work and product quality related to water. Additionally, many organizations have created groups for professions that deal with water infrastructure and safety. Some of these profession include public health professionals, engineers, and scientific researchers.
- Research: Several of these organizations also promote environmental and public health related research and aid in funding and education of these projects.
- Governmental:Many organizations related to water justice work with or within the government to enact change in water policy and management. This can include city and state governments, to the federal government, to Tribal governments.

=== Case studies: Africa ===
Obuasi, Ghana is the home of one of the world's top gold mining sites. It was in 1897 when the first machinery was used to mine the gold from the region. As the years went by, new strategies were needed to establish out ways to "treat the ores". By 1908, A leading chemist was brought in to help with the strategies and brought his Australian method of "dry crushing and roasting preparatory to treatment with cyanide". Many rivers, fishing areas, and irrigation systems have been either slightly or permanently damaged. The mining industry has tried to compensate by building standpipes but for many, they have been to no use. The average amount of contamination in the water system of Obuasi was over 10–38 times the maximum amount that is allowable by law. The two main sources of the contamination is the arsenic powder that flows out from the mills and the extensive amount of run-off water that is disposed of through dams. "Thus in the processing of the ore for gold, the dust may contain particles of the ore, ferric oxide, oxides of arsenic and sulphur". The dust will then get carried into the atmosphere and settle on the soil, humans, and rivers. In Obuasi, they receive a high annual rainfall due to the tropical rainforest that surrounds it (Smedley, 1996, 464). During precipitation or rainfall, the dust "may be oxidized to the trioxide by the air and be converted to the sulphate in dew and rainwater". The soil is the main target of contamination because the soil is contaminated and whatever vegetation grows and decays goes right back in the soil which results in the contamination of the groundwater. However, the groundwater is not as polluted as the streams or rivers mainly due to the high dissolving process of the arsenic and due to the basement rocks that lie between the groundwater and the soil. "The only disadvantage is that whatever is deposited on the surface soil may be carried to greater depths with time by rainwater (Gish et al, 2010, 1973)". The most extensively damaged areas are the ones closest to the mines, but with the wind carrying the dust, areas hundreds of miles away are getting contaminated by the chemicals. Due to the extensive output of the chemicals from the mining mills and un resolved toxic spills, many rivers, streams, lakes and irrigation systems have been damaged or obsolete. The local residents have been affected greatly by this phenomenon. Residents have seen the environmental changes especially in the water. Sludge floats down on streams that were once main sources of drinking water according to local residents. All the marine life in the rivers and streams has died due to the high amounts of chemicals in the water. According to Action Aid, residents have seen pipes that run straight into local streams and rivers that were depositing the waste directly sometimes causing flooding of the streams and rivers (2006, 11). Many local farmers suffered the hardest with the contamination of the water. Due to the irrigation systems using the contaminated water to irrigate all of the soil were then contaminated as well. The soil was no longer usable, causing the killing off their crops that were used for their business as well as for their own families. Children have also been targeted and affected by the pollution. According to Action Aid, many schools have been flooded with the over flow of the local streams, causing the children to leave school, sometimes permanently. AngloGold Ashanti (AGA) has put up standpipes to compensate for the contaminated water supplies, but these have also been useless to the locals. Standpipes were installed in the 1940s and 50s that have now been contaminated with arsenic from the mills. AGA staff claim it is because of them being made of iron, but studies have shown large amounts of arsenic in the water. Many standpipes have been either broken or obsolete. This leads to the residents to walk at least 1.5 miles to go get clean water. All the work the local people have to go through to get clean water is uncalled for. No compensation has been giving to the local residents for the damage they have done to their water and environment.

== Economy ==
=== Global economy ===
Globalization has benefitted the economy greatly through increased trade and production of food, energy, and goods. However, the increase of trade and production of goods requires large quantities of water, in fact the OECD countries predict that by 2050, the global demand for water will increase by 55%. Multiple countries and organizations have declared a water crisis. Water is a finite resource that is shared between nations, within nations, multiple interest groups and private organizations. Roughly 50% of all water available is located between two or more nation states. Water politics and management requires efficient water allocation through policies and cooperation between nations. Poor water politics and practices can result in water conflict, which is more common surrounding freshwater due to its necessity for survival. Countries that have a greater supply of water have greater economic success due to an increase in agricultural business and the production of goods, whereas countries, which have limited access to water, have less economic success. This gap in economic success due to water availability can also result in water conflict. The World Trade Organization has emerged as a key figure in the allocation of water in order to protect the agricultural trade. Water is an essential commodity in the global market for economic success.

==== Jordan River ====
The Jordan River conflict, otherwise known as the War over Water is an example of transboundary conflict between Israel, Jordan, Lebanon and Palestine. This water conflict begun in 1953 as a result of poor water politics and management between nation states and negotiations are ongoing. The conflict begun with Jordan's intention to irrigate land using a shared basin for agriculture and economic purposes, in response, Israel closed the gates of a dam in the Sea of Galilee, draining the water available. Negotiations started with the Bunger Plan that would allocate water from the Jordan River fairly among the surrounding nations, however Israel declared its riparian rights were not recognized. The consequences of the Jordan River conflict has resulted in economic damages to irrigation, agriculture, production, and resources to all of the nation states involved. The World Health Organization records that the total global economic loss associated with inadequate water politics, supply and sanitation is estimated at $260 billion annually USD. The Jordan River conflict demonstrates a lack of efficient transboundary water politics, which has contributed to this annual global economic loss. Currently, negotiations have attempted to establish a fair divide and share of the Jordan River, but have had little success.

==== Aral Sea ====
The water conflict in the Aral Sea is an ongoing transboundary conflict starting from 1991 between Kazakhstan, Kyrgyzstan, Turkmenistan, Tajikistan and Uzbekistan. Social causes such as economic development, population growth, electricity demand, and pollution has resulted in water scarcity. The water scarcity has resulted in limited availability to allocate water efficiently between the neighboring countries. The water scarcity has impacted many aspects of life and resources such as; fish, biodiversity, water, air pollution, forestry, agricultural land and ecosystem availability. The impact of poor water politics and management has negatively influenced the economy of the surrounding countries and has created stress on resources that are crucial to the agricultural sector. Research indicates that water scarcity can cost regions up to 6 percent of their GDP and cause migration, which negatively impacts the local economy. There have been multiple attempts to resolve the conflict from different organizations such as The Interstate Commission for Water Coordination, Interstate Council of the Aral Sea, and The Aral Sea Basin Program, but the issue is still ongoing.

=== Local economy ===
Water politics is present within nations, otherwise known as subnational. The shared jurisdiction of access to water between intergovernmental actors is crucial to efficient water politics. Inefficient water politics at the subnational level has a greater impact on the local economy through increased costs for businesses, increased costs for the agricultural sector, decreased local competitiveness, decrease in local jobs and infrastructure costs. For instance, Texas plans to build reservoirs to combat water shortages; these reservoirs will cost more than $600 per acre-foot for construction. Subnational states have a crucial role in water politics through managing local water sources and addressing issues concerning water politics such as allocation, scarcity and water pollution.

==== Colorado River basin ====
The Colorado River basin is transboundary basin shared between the United States and Mexico. However at the subnational level within United States, the basin is shared between Colorado, Utah, Arizona, Nevada and California. The Colorado River Basin demonstrates intergovernmental conflict over the autonomy of water politics. Intergovernmental water politics has many actors such as private organizations and interest groups. Cooperation in subnational water politics can result in economic benefits through shared costs and risk for infrastructure. In addition, efficient water politic management results in profitable allocations of water that can sustain irrigation and the agricultural sector.

== Human rights ==
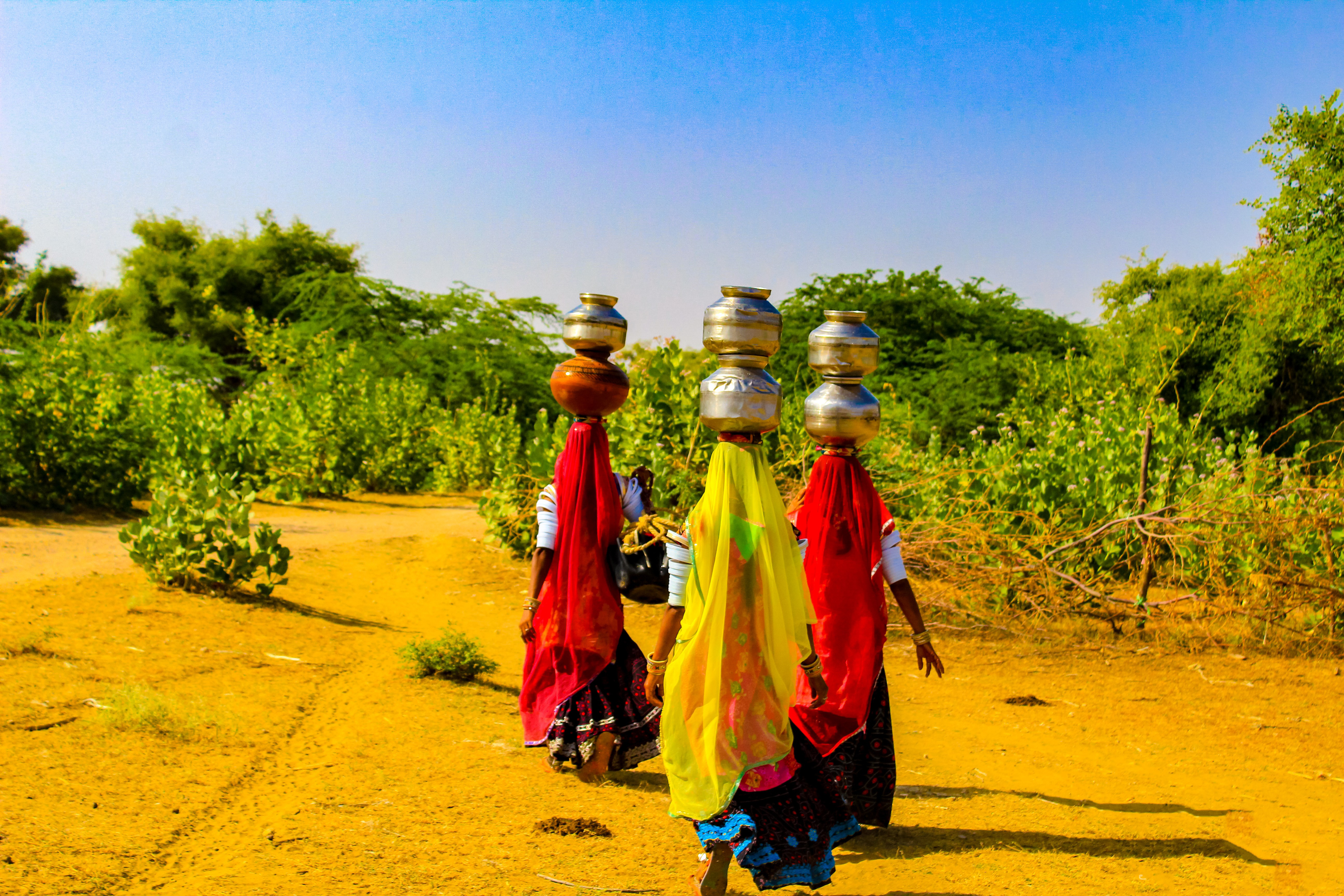
Indian women carrying water

Water is an absolute necessity in human sustainability and human survival. There is no human activity that can be sustained without the use of water whether it be at a direct or indirect level. The United Nations declared access to water as a fundamental basic human right under articles 11 and 12 of the International Covenant, which identifies and protects rights at an international level. In addition, the Millennium Development Goals of 2000 includes the sharing and fair allocation of water as a major goal. The United Nations and Millennium Development Goals oppose water privatization because water is a human right and every human being is entitled to water use. Equal access to water entails that no individual should be given privilege over the other at the absolute basic level. The sale of water cannot be permitted or justified under the United Nations at the basic level because water is seen as a universal human right. The right to water was created specifically to assist poor individuals in developing countries through attaining equitable access to water to prevent illness and death. Additionally, water rights are also associated with protecting the environment, strengthening the economy and strengthening the water delivery system.

There have been many agreements set in place to try to avoid inequality and conflict with the use of water. Still, international leaders are struggling with incorporating bilateral and multilateral agreements to ensure efficient and fair water allocation. For instance, there are approximately 275 river basins and 270 ground water aquifers with policies that manage the sharing of the resource by two or more nations. Despite the use of policies in the shared management of water, there have been multiple conflicts between nations because of poor water allocation. Likewise, there has been over 300 water treaties signed internationally in dealing with water sharing yet the management and allocation of water is still unresolved. Currently, policies and agreements intended to address water politics and allocation between nation states are insufficient. The United Nations has not presented an initiative to create a strategic framework to penalize nations, which have water conflicts. Without enforcement of such policies and frameworks nations feel minimal pressure in complying with policies, resulting in continued inefficient practice of water politics. There has been a demand from countries and interest groups for the United Nations to set out a policy with rules and boundaries on water sharing and allocation. This policy must include clear-cut penalties for countries that go against the policies.

As the availability of water decreases daily, the demand for policies and agreements to address water allocation and sharing increases. Bilateral and multilateral agreements are most important for third world countries since water is a scarce resource, and they will be the first to face water shortages. The purpose of agreements is to ensure that all individuals have access to water as part of their fundamental basic human rights. Developed countries can offer resources to trade for water but third world countries are not as well off as developed countries and will lag behind. If agreements are not set in place many third world countries will have no choice but to turn to warfare in order to secure water. Water wars can arise over the necessity of water for survival; a lack of water can result in economic consequences, biodiversity consequences, environmental consequences, illness and even death. The United Nations emphasizes and prioritizes water as a human right. However, the United Nations fails to create a policy that appropriately creates balance in terms of water-sharing and allocation.

== Hydropsychology ==
The creation of policies and agreements becomes even more difficult when the matter of hydropsychology is factored in. Hydropsychology is known as the use of water at the micro-level or at the individual level. Hydropsychology is advantageous because it studies the use of water at the smaller scale. Hydropsychology is noted as the bottom-up approach whereas hydropolitics (water politics) is the top-down approach. Historically, hydropsychology was not given much attention because international leaders focused on international water sharing and allocation rather than domestic use. Currently, international leaders are now requesting urgent and increased attention from the international community on the matter of hydropsychology because it greatly impacts water scarcity. For example, the United States has a large abundance of water; as a result the United States micro-level management of water provides the ability for the United States to have recreational activities such as water parks that provides economic advantages. Whereas, many third world countries do not have access to clean water and their situation will only worsen as the water supply lessens. Hydropsychology is important because it determines how much of the world's water supply is being used at the micro-level. Furthermore, the usage of water for recreational activity instead of sustainability creates a significant increase in the attention that hydropsychology is now receiving as there are drastic gaps between the availability of water in countries. Some countries use water freely for recreation, whereas other countries had limited supplies for survival, efficient water politics addresses this issue through good water allocation and management. Hydropsychology indicates that the interest of certain individuals and communities in certain countries takes precedence over the importance of equality and water as a human right. However countries can utilize resources however they please, international agreements exist to avoid water conflict between nations through efficient water allocation practices.

There has been a proposition in a more balanced approach for water-sharing and allocation through a combination of large scale politics on the international level and smaller scale politics (hydropsychology) rather than focusing strictly one a singular approach. This balanced approach would include policies created at community levels and national levels in order to address the issue of water-sharing and allocation. Currently, hydropolitics only studies water at the international level and hydropsychology studies water at local level. The failure of hydropolitics on its own is demonstrated through the conflicts that have occurred in the past and present between nations that share and manage water together. Thus the combination of hydropolitics and hydropsychology would assist international leaders with addressing water-sharing. Both hydropolitics and hydropsychology have different approaches on dealing with the matter and the different ideas can merge to create a more complete solution. The combination of hydropsychology and hydropolitics will also assist in dealing with matters such as virtual water trading, river linking scheme, large dams, and climate change. The advantage is based on the premise that the use of water starts at the individual level, which eventually impacts the actions of governments and major institutions. The international level pays minimal attention to local affairs but has extensive knowledge on international policies. Subsequently, the local level pays minimal attention to international affairs but has major knowledge on local water use. Thus, the combination of the two make up for the lack of attention each level gives to the other. It is also important to note that the individual level has an impact on the governmental level, which affects the abundance of water, and international agreements that will be created. The reconciliation of hydropolitics and hydropsychology must be considered in dealing with water-sharing. The importance of hydropsychology was neglected in the past but its importance is extremely evident for the present and future.

== Privatization ==
Privatization of water companies has been contested on several occasions because of poor water quality, increasing prices, and ethical concerns. In Bolivia for example, the proposed privatization of water companies by the International Monetary Fund was met by popular protests in Cochabamba in 2000, which ousted Bechtel, a US engineering firm based in San Francisco. Suez has started retreating from South America because of similar protests in Buenos Aires, Santa Fe, and Córdoba, Argentina. Consumers took to the streets to protest water rate hikes of as much as 500 percent mandated by Suez. In South and Central America, Suez has water concessions in Argentina, Bolivia, Brazil and Mexico. "Bolivian officials fault Suez for not connecting enough households to water lines as mandated by its contract and for charging as much as $455 a connection, or about three times the average monthly salary of an office clerk", according to The Mercury News.

South Africa also made moves to privatize water, provoking an outbreak of cholera that killed 200.

In 1997, World Bank consultants assisted the Philippine government in the privatization of the city of Manila's Metropolitan Waterworks and Sewerage Systems (MWSS). By 2003, water price increases registered at 81% in the east zone of the Philippines and 36% in the west region. As services became more expensive and inefficient under privatization, there was reduced access to water for poor households. In October 2003, the Freedom from Debt Coalition reported that the diminished access to clean water resulted in an outbreak of cholera and other gastrointestinal diseases.

Water privatization is a strategy utilized to deliver a secure and sustainable supply of water from private organizations rather than having the public sector provide this service. Privatization of water politics entails a reorganization of water allocation from the public sector to the private sector through privatization and commercialization of water. The government forfeits the management of water politics to a private organization. Private organizations allocate water based on capitalism mechanisms. The commercialization of water politics in the private sector distributes water based on rationales that concern economic profitability.

Historically, water privatization has resulted in civil disputes, protests and wars. The United Nations classifies access to clean drinking water as a universal human right.

=== Mexico City ===
Water privatization has been adopted in Mexico City to combat the growing concern of poor water politics offered by the public sector. Under the public sector, it was estimated that Mexico City lost up to 40% of its water through leaky pipes. In 1994, Mexico City privatized its water services through the Distrito Federal to tackle water shortages. The environmental and economic scenario at the time pressured the Party of the Democratic Revolution to adapt water privatization in order to address water shortages. Mexico City is one of few examples of a successful privatization of water services. From 1994 to 2003 multinational water corporations provided an increase of water quality services, while the public sector held control of infrastructure. However, recently Mexico City has faced some hardships in water privatization due to contract negotiations between the public and private sector, which has resulted in stalled efficiency of water services.

=== Bolivia ===
Bolivia privatized its water supply in the city of Cochabamba in 1999 to Sempa, a multinational private water organization. Afterwards, Bolivia signed a $2.5 billion contract, behind closed doors for Cochabamba's water system to Aguas del Tunari. The privatization of Cochabamba's water supply resulted in The Cochabamba Water War, which started in 1999 and concluded in 2000. The Cochabamba Water War resulted in multiple protests and violent outbreaks in response to the privatization of water. Aguas del Tunari promised to provide electricity and irrigation to Cochabamba. In addition, Bechtel, a major shareholder of Aguas del Tunari, ensured that water and sewage services would increase dramatically under private management. However, Cochabamba citizens were told that these services would result in a 35% increase in costs for water. The Bolivian government enacted Law 2029 which provided a regime of concessions regarding the provision of water, Law 2029 essentially gave the private sector the water monopoly and exclusive rights to water within Cochabamba. The goal of law 2029 was to provide more efficient water services to areas in Cochabamba that had a population over 10,000 citizens through water privatization. The situation in Cochabamba was exacerbated when the cost of water doubled, and even tripled in certain areas. The rise in costs was due to the construction of the Misicuni dam project and the debt left behind by Sempa. The drastic increase in cost for water supply resulted in protests that shut down the city for four days. Peaceful protests led by Oscar Olivera quickly became violent causing multiple protests that lasted days resulting in the Bolivian government declaring a state of emergency The Cochabamba water war concludes with President Huge Banzer resigning from office, leaving Bolivia in similar conditions before the privatization of water

== See also ==
- Drainage law
- Water management
- Water export
- International waters, Territorial waters, Internal waters
- Water politics in the Nile Basin
- Mekong River Commission
- Water scarcity in Africa
- Water supply terrorism
- US:
  - United States groundwater law
  - Clean Water Protection Act
  - Highlands Water Protection and Planning Act
  - California Water Wars
  - Colorado River Compact
  - Ogallala Aquifer
  - Navajo Indian Irrigation Project

== Bibliography ==
- Boccaletti, Giulio. Water: A Biography (Pantheon Books, 2021) online review of this book
- "Gold Rush" (PDF). Action Aid. 2006.
- Golow, A.A; A Schlueter; S Amihere-Mensah; H.L.K. Granson; M.S Tetteh (1996). "Distribution of Arsenic and Sulphate in the Vicinity of Ashanti Goldmine at Obuasi, Ghana". Bulletin of Environmental Contamination and Toxicology. 56 (5): 703–710. Bibcode:1996BuECT..56..703G. doi:10.1007/s001289900103. PMID 8661851. S2CID 44760105..
- Rahaman, M. M. (Editor) in need Issue: Water Wars in 21st Century along International Rivers Basins: Speculation or Reality?, International Journal of Sustainable Society, Vol. 4, Nos. 1/2, 193 pages. 2012
- "HRW, Decade, Water for Life, 2015, UN-Water, United Nations, MDG, Water, Sanitation, Financing, Gender, IWRM, Human Right, Transboundary, Cities, Quality, Food Security, General Comment, BKM, Albuquerque". United Nations, July 2010. Retrieved 2 March. 2017.

=== United States ===
- Burch, Jr., John R. Water Rights and the Environment in the United States (ABC-CLIO 2015), a comprehensive documentary and reference guide to historical water issues.
- Carson, Rachel, Silent Spring (Riverside Press, 1962), highly influential in shaping public opinion in United States.
- Copeland, Claudia. Ocean Dumping Act: A Summary of the Law. Washington, D.C.: Congressional Research Service, Library of Congress, 1999. National Oceanic and Atmosphere Administration. Congressional Research Service, 15 December 2015. Retrieved 2 March 2017.
- Serageldin, I. "Water: conflicts set to arise within as well as between states", Nature, Vol. 459, p. 163. 2009.
- Smith, Frank E. ed. Conservation in the United States: Land and Water 1900–1970 (1971) 780pp of primary sources
- "Drinking Water National and State Organizations and Programs". Drinking Water National and State Organizations and Programs. National Environmental Services Center, 2013. Retrieved 2 March 2017.
- "Drinking Water Safety". Centers for Disease Control and Prevention. Centers for Disease Control and Prevention, 19 May 2014. Retrieved 2 March 2017.
- "History of the Clean Water Act". EPA. Environmental Protection Agency, 25 May 2016. Retrieved 2 March 2017.
- "Human Health and Contaminated Water". EPA. Environmental Protection Agency, 7 June 2016. Retrieved 2 March 2017.
- Perlman, Howard. "Contaminants Found in Groundwater". Contaminants Found in Groundwater, USGS Water Science School. The USGS Water Science School, 2 December 2016. Retrieved 2 March 2017.
- "Summary of the Shore Protection Act". EPA. Environmental Protection Agency, 30 December 2016. Retrieved 2 March 2017.
- "Summary of the Safe Drinking Water Act". EPA. Environmental Protection Agency, 7 February 2017. Retrieved 2 March 2017.
- "Tribal Climate Change Guide". National Tribal Environmental Council. University of Oregon, 20 October 2015. Retrieved 2 March 2017.
- US Department of Commerce, National Oceanic and Atmospheric Administration. "Nonpoint Source Pollution". NOAA's National Ocean Service Education. U.S. Department of Commerce, 19 December 2004. Retrieved 2 March 2017.
- "Water Contamination". Centers for Disease Control and Prevention. Centers for Disease Control and Prevention, 11 October 2016. Retrieved 2 March 2017.
