= Water theft =

Illegal tapping of water supply systems

Water theft is illegal tapping of water supply systems. Together with losses from water leaks in the piping, water theft is one of the major factors contributing to non-revenue water. Thames Water estimated losses by theft to amount to 2 to 3 million litres (660,000 imp gal; 790,000 US gal) per year in 2017, flowing through 734 unauthorized connections. The basic controversy, however, of whether there can be such a thing as water theft (by individuals and for personal use, that is), is open.

== Roman period ==
Water theft is not a new phenomenon. In ancient Rome extensive networks of aqueducts provided a public supply of water to Roman cities. There was extensive theft from this system, often perpetrated by corrupt watermen responsible for installing and maintaining supplies. Corrupt practices included stamping an incorrect size on a supply pipe so that the customer was charged for a smaller pipe than the one they actually obtained, secretly providing an unapproved supply (usually underground where it could not be seen) by puncturing the mains pipe, and a scam that involved providing a new pipe when a property changed hands. In the latter case, instead of simply transferring the existing account to the new occupier, a new pipe was installed from the water tower. The old pipe was kept by the fraudster who then sold on the water from it.

Some other dubious practices may sometimes have been due to incompetence, and sometimes deliberate fraud. Installing a connection lower down on the water tower provides a higher pressure, and therefore faster flow, than one of the same capacity stamp fitted higher up. Another issue was that the connection at the tower could be of the authorised size and correctly stamped, but a much larger pipe was connected to it. This will draw more water than the smaller pipe despite the connectors being the same size. During the first century, much more detailed water standards and practices were promulgated to address some of these issues. These included the requirement that not only the connectors, but also the pipes had to be stamped with their authorised size along their entire lengths at specified distances. The regulations on overflow water was also tightened up. Overflow occurs when the aqueduct is delivering water to the towers faster than it is being consumed. Watermen previously considered that selling this water was a perk of the job, but could now only be supplied to authorised persons.

== See also ==
- Leak
- Right to water
- Water scarcity
- Water metering
- Water wars
- Water supply terrorism
