= Sfax Desalination Plant =

Desalination plant in Tunisia

- Location within Tunisia
- Interactive map of Sfax Desalination Plant
- Location: Sfax, Sfax Governorate
- Coordinates: 34°34′31″N 10°35′57″E
- Estimated output: 100,000 cubic meters (100,000,000 L) of water daily
- Extended output: 200,000 cubic meters (200,000,000 L) of water daily
- Cost: €300 million (US$350 million)
- Energy usage: 40 MW
- Technology: Reverse osmosis, Chlorination
- Percent of water supply: Estimated 100% of Sfax Metropolitan Area
- Operation date: February 2026 Expected

Sfax Desalination Plant is a sea water desalination plant under construction in the city of Sfax in Tunisia. The facility is under development by the Tunisian water utility company, National Company for the Exploitation and Distribution of Water (French: Société Nationale d’Exploitation et de Distribution des Eaux) (Sonede).

A consortium of European and Egyptian companies has been selected to carry out the mechanical, civil and hydrological engineering works on the project. Construction is expected to take 54 months with completion anticipated in the first half of 2026.

== Location ==
The desalination plant would be located on a site measuring 20 hectares (49 acres), in the community of Gargour, Tunisia, approximately 20 kilometres (12 mi), south of the city of Sfax, in the Sfax Governorate.

Sfax is the second-largest city in Tunisia, and is located about 267 kilometres (166 mi) by road, south of Tunis, the capital and largest city in that country.

== Overview ==
The main objective of this project is to improve the "quantity and quality of drinking water" available to the inhabitants of Sfax City and Sfax Governorate. Before the implementation of this infrastructure project, the supply of potable water in the vicinity of Sfax City was severely constrained. Residents have expressed their displeasure regarding the supply of drinking water availed to them.

The project involves the construction the laying of salt water intake pipes from the Mediterranean Sea, building of the desalination plant, laying of the brine discharge pipes back to the sea, a pumping station, a fresh-water storage facility and piping to take the fresh water to where it will enter the Sfax City water system.

Other infrastructure developments include the construction of a 15 kilometres (9 mi) 150kV high voltage electricity transmission line that will bring the 40 megawatts to the desalination plant. The power line is expected to comprise 40 pylons. A substation will be built at the desalination plant, to mediate the wattage and amperage between the plant and power line.

== Construction ==
A consortium of three companies was awarded the engineering, procurement and construction (EPC) contract, in August 2021. The table below details the members in the consortium.

Members of Safix Desalination Consortium
Rank	Member	Domicile		Notes
1	Técnicas de Desalinización de Aguas (Tedagua)	Spain	Water acquisition, treatment and recovery company.	
2	Metito	United Arab Emirates	Water engineering group focusing on Chemicals, Utilities, Design & Build.	
3	Orascom Construction	Egypt	An engineering, procurement and construction (EPC) contractor based in Cairo, Egypt.	

The electrical installations, including the 150kV transmission line and the switchyard (substation) are the responsibility the Tunisian electricity utility company, Tunisian Company of Electricity and Gas (STEG).

As part of the EPC contract, the Construction Consortium will operate the plant for a minimum of two years, before handing it over to Sonede.

== Funding ==
The total budget for the project is reported as US$350 million (approx. €300 million or TND:960 million). Of the total an estimated €250 million (approx. $295 million or TND:800 million) was financed as a loan to the government of Tunisia, by the Japanese government, through the Japan International Cooperation Agency (JICA). The loan is repayable over a 25-year period, with a grace period of 7 years.

== See also ==
- Desalination
- Water supply and sanitation in Tunisia
