= Water supply terrorism =

Acts of sabotage to a water supply system

Water supply terrorism involves acts of sabotage to a water supply system, through chemical or biological warfare or infrastructural sabotage. Throughout military history and the history of terrorism, water supply attacks have been perpetrated by political groups, intending to scare, cause death, or drought.

== Chemical and biological attacks ==
=== Examples ===
In 1984, members of the Rajneeshee religious cult contaminated a city water supply tank in The Dalles, Oregon, United States, using Salmonella and infected 750 people.

In 1992, the Kurdistan Workers' Party (PKK) put lethal concentrations of potassium cyanide in the water tanks of a Turkish Air Force compound in Istanbul.

In 2000, workers at the Cellatex chemical plant in northern France dumped 5000 liters of sulfuric acid into a tributary of the Meuse River when they were denied workers' benefits.

In 2000, Queensland, Australia, police arrested a man for using a computer and a radio transmitter to take control of the Maroochy Shire wastewater system and release sewage into parks, rivers and property.

=== LSD threats to the water supply ===
Despite the fact that it is impractical and very unlikely to produce any effect at large scale, during the 1960s a great deal of attention was paid to the notion that counter-culture figures could intoxicate a whole city by putting a small dose of LSD in the water supply.

On 19 March 1966, London Life ran an interview claiming that anyone could take control of London in under eight hours by putting 'acid' in the water system. Dr Donald Johnson claimed: "It is quite feasible that LSD could be used to take over a city or even a country. I agree if it were put into reservoirs, it would disable people sufficiently for an enemy to take control."

In November 1966 Vue magazine ran "Why They Had to Outlaw LSD", in which writer WH Carr claimed that "[A] few ounces of it, dumped in the water supply of a major city, could shake up millions."

Counter-culture icon Abbie Hoffman threatened to put LSD in Chicago's water-supply to protest the Vietnam War during the Democratic convention.

== Infrastructural or resource-based attacks ==
=== History ===
In 1999, a bomb destroyed the main water pipeline in Lusaka, Zambia, cutting off water for 1.1 million people in the city.

In 2001, water flow to Kumanovo (population 100,000) was cut off for 12 days in conflict between ethnic Albanians and Macedonian forces.

The Revolutionary Armed Forces of Colombia (FARC) detonated a bomb inside a tunnel in the Chingaza Dam, which provides most of Bogotá's water.

Four incendiary devices were found in the pumping station of a Michigan water-bottling plant. The Earth Liberation Front (ELF) claimed responsibility, accusing Ice Mountain Water Company of stealing water for profit.

In 2003, Jordanian authorities arrested Iraqi agents in connection with a failed plot to poison the water supply that serves American troops in the eastern Jordanian desert near the border with Iraq.

In 2006, Tamil Tiger rebels cut the water supply to government-held villages in northeastern Sri Lanka. Sri Lankan government forces then launched attacks on the reservoir, declaring the Tamil actions to be terrorism.

=== Draining of the Mesopotamian Marshes ===
The draining of the Mesopotamian Marshes occurred in Iraq and to a smaller degree in Iran between the 1950s and 1990s to clear large areas of the marshes in the Tigris-Euphrates river system. Formerly covering an area of around 20,000 km^{2} (7,700 mi^{2}), the main sub-marshes, the Hawizeh, Central, and Hammar Marshes were all drained at different times for different reasons. Initial draining of the Central Marshes was intended to reclaim land for agriculture but later all three marshes became a tool of war and revenge.

Many international organizations such as the U.N. Human Rights Commission, the Supreme Council of the Islamic Revolution in Iraq (SCIRI), the International Wildfowl and Wetlands Research Bureau, and Middle East Watch have described the draining as a political attempt to force the Ma'dan people out of the area through water diversion tactics.

== In popular culture ==
- Kurt Vonnegut's book Cat's Cradle (1963) describes a fictional chemical that freezes water at room temperature and ends up destroying the world.
- In 1966, Robert Thom published the short story called "The Day It All Happened, Baby!", which became the film Wild in the Streets, directed by Barry Shear in 1968 and in which LSD added to the water supply of Washington, D.C., is a crucial plot device.
- The film The Tuxedo (2002), starring Jackie Chan, features a power-hungry bottled-water mogul trying to destroy the world's natural water supply to force everyone to drink his bottled water.
- The film Batman Begins (2005) portrays a terrorist's attempt to introduce a vapor-borne hallucinogen into the water system.
- The film Waterborne (2005) is set in the aftermath of a bio-terrorist attack on the water supply of Los Angeles.
- The film V for Vendetta (2006) features corrupt government leaders contaminating London's water supply.
- In the video game Final Fantasy VI (1994), a siege on the fictional kingdom of Doma by an army of the Gestahlian Empire is broken when Kefka Palazzo releases a deadly poison into Doma's water supply. This not only breaks the siege, but kills most of Doma's inhabitants in the process.

== See also ==
- Well poisoning
- Water privatisation
- Water industry
- Water diversion
- Drought
