= Water supply in Sudan =

Sudan is a country that is half desert and much of the population suffers from a shortage of clean drinking water as well as a reliable source of water for agriculture. With the Nile river in the east of the country, parts of Sudan have substantialresources, but those in the west have to rely on wadis, seasonal wells which often dry up. These imbalances in water availability are a source of hardship, as well as a source of conflict. While storage facilities are limited, many local communities have constructed makeshift dams and reservoirs, weirs, which help in stabilizing farming communities. Farmers also utilize hafirs to store rain water which falls in the rainy season, but groundwater remains a vital source of water for over 80% of Sudanese people. For decades, political instability has led to terrible conditions and thwarted many projects and relief efforts, but aid is making its way through. Several water infrastructure projects have been enacted in recent years, with both domestic and international sources of funding. Funding from the UN has provided 9,550 local farmers with better access to water and fertile soils. A project which also plans to replant forest cover in the wadi to reverse desertification.

Darfur is located in an arid region, in the western part of Sudan, where water scarcity is common. Due to recent population growth, there is an increased pressure on urban water supply sources and infrastructure. Now there is a greater difficulty accessing water—especially for cattle farmers. Many women and children, mostly girls, spend countless hours walking to a clean water supply a year preventing time taking care of children and schooling. Collecting water from ponds, marshes, ditches, or hand-dug wells, often contaminated with disease-causing parasites and bacteria. Experience dry and wet seasons. Wet seasons are plentiful with rainfall and crops; however, dry seasons force families to make mile treks for water and some relocated during the dry seasons.

== Water resources ==
The Nile River flows through the eastern part of the country and provides a large portion of those living nearby with ample water for drinking and agriculture. Wetlands flanking the Nile cover almost 10% of the country, and support diverse riparian ecosystems. Others living in the more arid western region rely on wells or seasonal wadi to obtain their daily water. These wadis are dry stream beds for large portions of the year, but people are able to access the groundwater that accumulates underneath by digging well holes. Water storage infrastructure is limited throughout the western part of the country, but many local communities have constructed makeshift dams and reservoirs called weirs which can store water for future use and play big parts in stabilizing farming communities. Farmers also utilize hairs to store rainwater during the rainy season, but groundwater remains a vital source of water for over 80% of Sudanese people. The Nubian Sandstone Aquifer System, the largest aquifer in the country, provides most of Sudan's drinking water,

== Quality ==
Another concern within Sudan is the quality of the water people have access to. In eastern Sudan, a study was conducted in the cities of Wad Madani and Al Khartoum that revealed 86% of water in public taps was meeting both Sudanese and international quality levels. In Darfur, water scarcity is more prevalent with many people regularly being exposed to drought and famine conditions. Most of the western part of Sudan lacks year round access to quality water, as the wadi are dry for much of the year unless heavy rains fall. Due to instability in much of this part of the county, water quality dramatically decreases when compared to the more water-secure east. The capital of Sudan, Khartoum, will benefit greatly from the Grand Ethiopian Renaissance Dam and looks to be in a much better position with regards to accessing quality sanitary water in the near future. Many of the communities living nearby the border of Chad are exposed to chronic water shortages with no solution in sight until the conflicts are fully resolved.

== Water Treatment ==
United Nations Office for Project Services (UNOPS), rehabilitated an unused water treatment plant in El Fasher, Darfur’s state capital, installing a chlorination unit ensuring water quality. This unit now produces enough water for 37,500 people a day.

Fecal contamination of drinking water supplies is the main cause of diseases found in water. Proper disposal, waste removal, of fecal matter are rare and often difficult without a proper plumbing infrastructure. Consequently, child stunting rate increases with high levels of open defecation and limited access to improved water sources. Poor sanitation conditions cause about 700,000 children deaths a year and prevent full mental and physical development.

== Plans for improvement ==
An organization called United Nations Office for Project Services (UNOPS) had done chlorination plant projects in Darfur's capital city of El Fasher with major funding from Japan. The organization rehabilitated a water treatment plant in 2010, then installed a chlorination plant to improve the quality for over 37,500 people. In the city of El Daein, UNOPS had done projects rehabilitating water treatment facilities, helping over 50,000 with access to clean water. Japan has played a huge part by providing funding and expertise in projects to develop rural Sudan and its access to clean water. UNOPS had completed projects that now help over 250,000 people with access to a potable water source.

The Grand Ethiopian Renaissance Dam is already under construction on the Nile river just nine miles upstream of the border of Sudan and has the potential for a multitude of positive effects for the country. More reliable river levels would allow large-scale irrigation and agricultural production that was not possible due to the annual change of the Nile within Sudan being over 8 m Hydro-electric power produced from the dam would exceed the amount needed by Ethiopia, so Sudan will stand to benefit greatly by being able to purchase this extra power. Another benefit from this dam will be creation of jobs, as the infrastructure to distribute the electricity efficiently does not exist yet and will have to be built.

Grassroots organizations have seen success in the Darfur region, an example being the Wadi El Ku Catchment Forum, which was founded to help the 81,000 residents in the Wadi El Ku area provide more water for their crops. The local group consists of 50 representatives from 34 villages in the area, and these men and women decided the construction of weirs would be both cost-efficient and help the most people. Their efforts to build three weirs with funding from the UN provided 9,550 local farmers with better access to water and fertile soils. This project also plans to replant forest cover in the wadi to accommodate pastoral farmers and reverse climate change from previous desertification.

== See also ==
- History of irrigation in Sudan
