= Water supply and sanitation in Tunisia =

Data
- Water coverage (broad definition): (improved water source) 96% (2011)
- Sanitation coverage (broad definition): (improved sanitation) 90% (2011)
- Continuity of supply: 24 hours out of 24 (average 2003)
- Share of household metering: 100% in urban areas
- Annual investment in WSS: 70 Mio. TD (2012) for drinking water in urban areas, corresponding to about US$9/capita/year
- Share of external financing: n/a

Institutions
- National water and sanitation company: For Water Supply: SONEDE; For Sanitation: ONAS
- Responsibility for policy setting: For Water Resources and Supply: The Ministry of Agriculture and Hydraulic Resources; For Sanitation: The Ministry of Environment and Sustainable Development
- Sector law: Yes

Tunisia has achieved the highest access rates to water supply and sanitation services among the Middle East and North Africa. As of 2011, access to safe drinking water became close to universal approaching 100% in urban areas and 90% in rural areas. Tunisia provides good quality drinking water throughout the year.

Responsibility for the water supply systems in urban areas and large rural centres is assigned to the Sociéte Nationale d'Exploitation et de Distribution des Eaux (SONEDE), a national water supply authority that is an autonomous public entity under the Ministry of Agriculture. Planning, design and supervision of small and medium water supplies in the remaining rural areas are the responsibility of the Direction Générale du Génie Rurale (DGGR).

In 1974, ONAS was established to manage the sanitation sector. Since 1993, ONAS got the status of a main operator for protection of water environment and combating pollution.

The rate of non-revenue water is the lowest in the region at 21% in 2012.

== Access ==
In 2015, 98% of Tunisian population had access to "improved water", 100% of the urban population and 93% of the rural population. Subsequently, there were, in 2015, 253 thousand people lacking access to "improved" water. Regarding sanitation, in 2015, 92% of the population had access to "improved" sanitation, 98% and 80%, urban and rural population, respectively. The total number of people that, in 2015, lacked access to "improved" sanitation was around 944 thousand people.

According to the Joint Monitoring Program by WHO and UNICEF, 96% of the Tunisian population had access to an improved water source and 90% to improved sanitation in 2004. Between 1990 and 2011, access to water increased from 81% to 96%, while the access to sanitation increased from 75% to 90%.

Tunisia has achieved the highest access rates to water supply and sanitation services among the MENA countries through sound infrastructure policy. 96% of urban dwellers and 52% of the rural population already have access to improved sanitation. By the end of 2006, access to safe drinking water has been expected to be close to universal (approaching 100% in urban areas and 90% in rural areas).

According to the Tunisian Ministry of Development and International Cooperation, in 2006 92.6% of the population had access to drinking water in homes.

== Service quality ==
=== Continuity of supply ===
Tunis, the capital of Tunisia is able to provide 24-hour water with a supply of 110 litres per capita and day. The continuity of supply is very good with respect to regional standards as it ensures good quality water throughout the year and has the lowest percentage of non-revenue water in the region.

=== Drinking water quality ===
Tunisia provides a good drinking water quality throughout the year. The quality of the water supplied by SONEDE and GBRE/ACI in rural areas varies according to local conditions. Drinking water quality is monitored from production to distribution from bacteriological and physico-chemical quality. The national water distribution utility (SONEDE) and the Ministry of Health undertake this monitoring.

=== Sewer services ===
The rate of connection to sewerage network in Tunisian urban areas increased from 20.6% in 1975 to 35.9% in 1987, and further up to 81.6% in 2007.

=== Wastewater treatment ===
Since 1960, Tunisia has engaged in studies of the re-use of wastewater. Currently, 7,000 hectares (17,000 acres), planted primarily with orchards and for livestock feed, use treated water for irrigation consistent with national law. The number of waste water treatment plants has gradually risen in the last decade and it is expected to reach 83 in 2006. Currently, 61 wastewater treatment plants are in operation with 9,650 km (6,000 mi) of wastewater network collecting 178 hm^{3} (million cubic metres) wastewater. The largest wastewater treatment plant is situated in Choutrana with a daily performance of 120,000 m^{3}.

== Water resources ==
=== Freshwater ===
The annual total volume of exploitable freshwater in Tunisia is about 4670 hm^{3}, out of which about 57% (2700 hm^{3}) is surface water and the remaining 43% (1970 hm^{3}) groundwater. Tunisia is a water stressed country with per capita renewable water availability of 486 m^{3}—well below the average of 1200 m³/capita for the Middle East and North Africa Region (MENA) region. Out of the available surface water resources of 2100 hm^{3}, only about 1220 hm^{3} are expected to be captured for actual use. Eighteen existing dams, 21 projected dams and 235 hillside dams are expected to augment the available supply but rapid sedimentation of reservoirs will progressively reduce storage capacity and shorten life. Excessive groundwater extraction in the coastal regions of Cap Bon, Soukra and Ariana has resulted in saline intrusion in many areas leading to groundwater being unsuitable for further regions. Only 50% of all water resources have salinity levels lower than 1500 mg/L and can be used without restriction. 84% of all groundwater resources have salinity of more than 1500 mg/L, and 30% of the shallow aquifers more than 4000 mg/L.

Table 1 shows accessible (A) and available water (B) in Tunisia in hm^{3} per year for different time-horizons

Accessible and Available Water in Tunisia|
	1990		2010		2020		2030	
	A	B	A	B	A	B	A	B
Large Dams	1340	871	1800	1170	1750	1138	1750	138
Hillside Dams and Lakes	65	59	100	50	70	35	50	45
Tubewells and springs	997	997	1250	1150	1250	1000	1250	1000
Open Wells	720	720	720	720	720	620	720	550
Reclaimed Water	120	120	200	200	290	290	340	340
Desalinated Water	7	7	10	10	24	24	49	49
Total	3249	2774	4080	3300	4104	3107	4159	3122

=== Desalination ===
The government plans to build four seawater desalination plants in Djerba, Kerkennah, Zaarat near Gabes and Sfax. The total installed capacity of the plants is 381,000 cubic meter/day at a cost of 620 million Tunisian Dinar. The capacity of the plants was increased by 50% in 2014 because groundwater availability was less than expected and water demand projections were higher than anticipated in studies conducted in 2006. The tenders for the 50,000 cubic meter/day plant in Djerba financed through a loan by German development bank KfW were opened in April 2014, with an option to increase capacity by another 25,000 cubic meter/day. It still remains to be decided if the large plants in Ziarat and Sfax, with a capacity of 100,000 and 200,000 cubic meter per day respectively, will be financed through loans or by the private sector through Build-Operate-Transfer (BOT) contracts. According to SONEDED chief executive Hedi Belhaj desalination plants are designed for peak demand during the two months summer season, while for the rest of the year demand is only a fraction of the installed capacity.

== Water use ==
The consumption of water was estimated at more than 2.4 km^{3} in Tunisia in 2005. In 1996, 86% of the water withdrawals were from agriculture. The water sector is also obliged to meet the increasing water demand for all urban and rural areas, the agriculture sector as well as for touristic and industrial needs. Through the management and development of water resources, available water resources increased from 2.76 km^{3} in 1991 to 3.525 km^{3} in 2000. It is planned that the supply will reach 4.6 km^{3} by 2010. This will mainly be done by developing unconventional resources, including the use of treated sewage water. According to estimations for the year 2030 by the Ministry of Agriculture, the demand of water would be stabilized of 2.7 km^{3} per year, even if the supposed population of Tunisia in 2030 will be about 13 million people and given today's regular demand would result in a demand of 3.1 km^{3} per year.

== History and recent developments ==
=== Evolution of water policy in Tunisia ===
Water policy in Tunisia from the beginning of the second half of the 20th century until the 1970s contained the limited mobilization of the resources – with the construction of dams and reservoirs.

From the beginning of the 1980s there was an enforcement of the dam policy and application of the Plans Directeurs des Eaux (Water Master Plan).

In 1990 the Decennial Strategy (1990–2000) for the Mobilization of Water Resources and the Maximum Mobilization Maximale of available Resources was set up. This strategy was devised and implemented in order to provide integrated control of potential water sources. The cost of this ten-year strategy approached two billion US dollars. The following table shows the perspective concerning water resources in Tunisia:

Perspective Water Resources in Tunisia|
Type of water resources	Potential resources [hm³]	Mobilizable resources [hm³]	Mobilized resources [hm³]|				
Type of water resources	Potential resources [hm³]	Mobilizable resources [hm³]	1990	1995	2000	2005	2010
Surface water	2700	2500	1179	1876	2200	2400	2500
Ground water	2140	2140	1576	1818	1860	1900	1940
Total	4840	4640	2755	3694	4060	4300	4440
Mobilization rate (%)			59	80	88	93	96

=== Recent developments ===
In 2003, the Ministry of Agriculture published the Water Master Plan for the water sector Two main strategic options were identified and implemented: the 10 years strategy of water resources mobilization (2001–2011) initiated for the 1st time in 1990, and the long-term strategy (2030).

In 2023, with the country in its fourth year of a drought, Sonede the state's water company has begun rationing water, cutting the main water supplies between 9pm and 4am.

== Responsibility for water supply and sanitation ==
=== Policy and regulation ===
The Ministry of Agriculture and Hydraulic Resources sets policies concerning conventional water resources in Tunisia, while the Ministry of Environment and Sustainable Development governs sanitation, wastewater and environmental planning. Its hydraulic works section, the Diréction Générale des Grands Barrages et des Grands Travaux Hydrauliques (DGBGTH), is responsible for the construction of major water resources projects.

=== Water resources management ===
Compared to other North African countries, Tunisia has developed and adopted numerous laws and plans regarding its water resources not only recently. Water Master Plans (WMP) exist already since 1970, when a first WMP was drafted for the Northern part of Tunisia, as this is the region containing most of the resources and related activities. The Centre and South successively followed, 1977 and 1983 respectively. The Ministry of Agriculture and Water Resources developed these Plans, which is also responsible for the implementation and allocation of water resources.

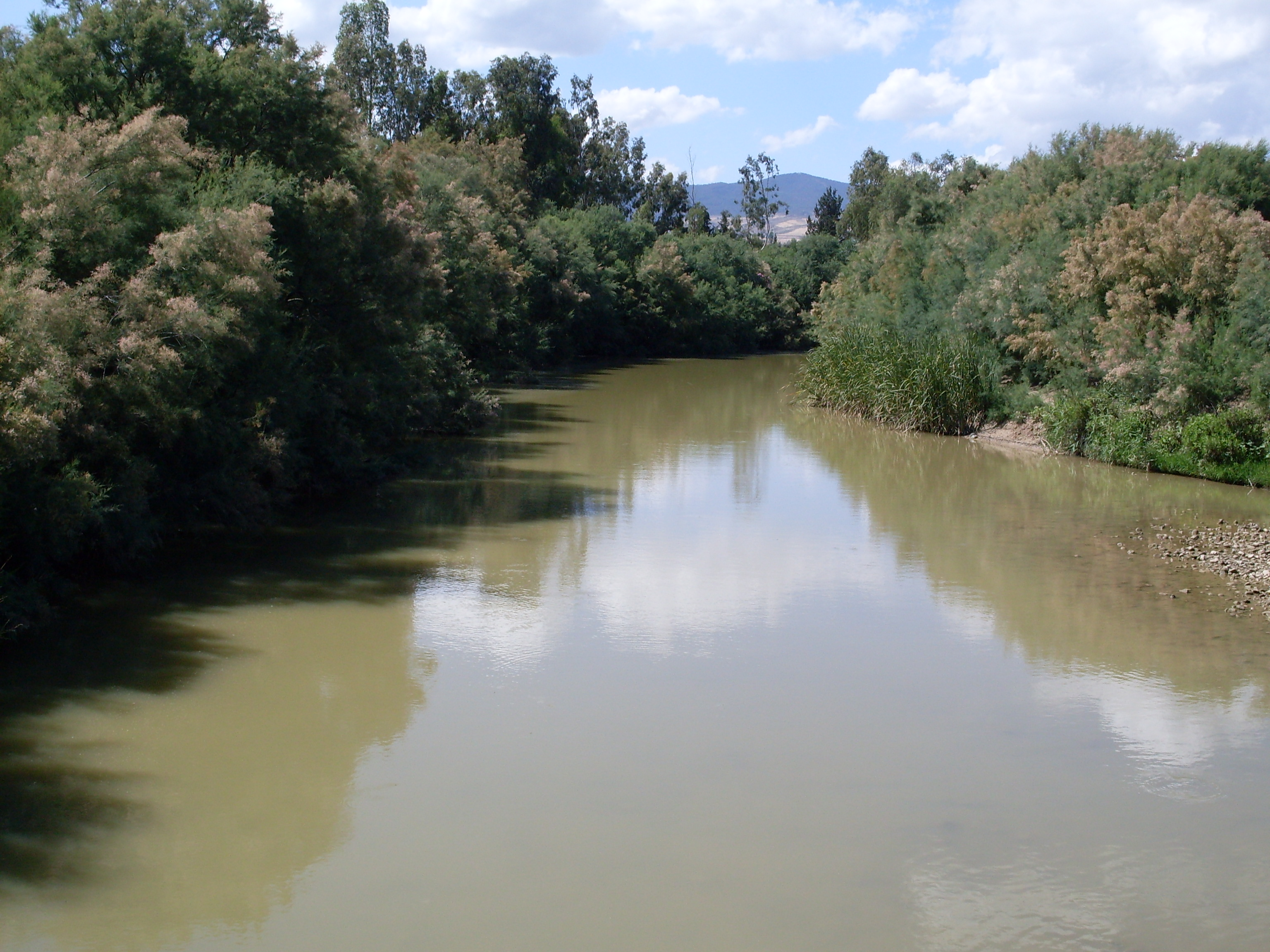
A river in Tunisia

The relatively high vulnerability of Tunisia's water resources has led to numerous programmes and projects aiming at improving water use efficiency. The current status, major deficits and core strategies are well described in Tunisia's country report on the water sector. Out of all relevant programs, the following national policies can be deduced:

a) The continuous development and mobilization of available water resources in order to reach a mobilization rate of 95%.

b) The integrated management of water resources, in particular the enhancement of transferring excess water volumes from rainy periods to seasons of drought.

c) Water saving and the control of demand across all sectors.

d) The further development of non-conventional water resources through expanding the use of treated wastewater in agriculture and desalinating brackish water for uses across all sectors.

e) The protection of water resources against pollution and over-exploitation.

In order to fulfill these policies, three major strategies have been put into place:

1. The Decennial Water Resources Mobilization Strategy (1990–2000): The major priority of this strategy is the increase of supply. The construction of more than 200 small and large dams and the drilling of more than 1000 deep groundwater wells have led to improvements of use of Tunisia's available water resources from 60% in 1990 to 87.5% in 2004. The total budget for the strategy was 2000 MTD (million Tunisian dinar) = US$1678 million).

2. The complementary strategy (2001–2011): The strategy attempts to realize long-term objectives, in particular the sustainable balance of demand and available water resources. It partly consists of similar measures compared to the mobilization strategy, aiming at reaching a mobilization rate of 95%.

Furthermore, the strategy puts an emphasis on regulation measures between wet and dry years, water and soil conservation measures, and the recharge of aquifers. The decennial strategy is divided into two 5-year plans, the Xth development plan (2002–2006) and the XIth development plan (2007–2011).

3. The long-term strategy (until 2030): The long-term strategy mainly builds up on the Water Master Plans for the north, center and south of Tunisia described in section 2. The strategy consists of a high number of studies and research programs with the target to plan and manage water resources more efficiently on a long run.

=== Service provision ===
==== Water supply ====
The National Water Supply Authority in Tunisia (SONEDE) is responsible for the provision of water supply services in Tunisia. SONEDE is a public non-administrative entity placed under supervision of the Ministry of Agriculture, Environment, and Hydraulic Resources (MAERH).

Planning and investment for the allocation of drinking water in rural areas is conducted by the Direction Générale du Genie Rurale (DGGR), which acts in the framework of the Ministry of Agriculture and user associations (Groupements d’intérêt collectif (GIC)).

The water sector in Tunisia has so far only seen very limited private participation. To date, private participation in the water sector is limited to a contracting programme. Despite a 1999 study on contracting, very few activities have been contracted out (security and cleaning).

==== Sanitation ====
The Office National de l'Assainissement (ONAS), is responsible for the sanitation in cities, industrial and tourist zones. The mandate of the ONAS also includes protection of the environment. In 1974, ONAS has been established in order to manage the sanitation sector. Since 1993, ONAS got the status of a main operator for protection of water environment and combating pollution.

Missions of ONAS:

- Combating water pollution
- Planning and implementing of sanitation sector programs and integrated wastewater treatment & storm water disposal projects;
- Construction, operation and maintenance of facilities intended for the sanitation of towns assigned to ONAS by decree;
- Sale and distribution of sub-products such as treated wastewater and sludge

The Directorate of Rural Engineering is responsible for sanitation in rural zones not covered by ONAS, and the municipalities are responsible for collecting and disposing of solid waste as well as drainage systems for the flow of rainwater.

== Economic efficiency ==
Labor productivity. In 2012, SONEDE had around 7016 employees. ONAS had 5500 employees as of 2002. The number of employees per 1000 connections for water only was 2.9, down from 4.1 in 2002. It was much higher adding the ONAS employees and thus above international standards.

Non-revenue water. Non-revenue water for SONEDE stood at 20,7% in 2012, up from only 14% in 2000.

== Financial aspects ==
=== Tariffs ===
Drinking water tariffs are uniform throughout the country. They include a fixed part and a variable part that depends on the consumption of water. As of September 2016, the variable part of the drinking water tariffs in Tunisia was as follows:

Drinking water tariffs in Tunisia
Consumption in m^{3}/3-month period	Tariff in DT per m^{3}
0-20	0.200
21-40	0.325
41-70	0.450
71-100	0.770
101-150	0.940
151-500	1.260
more than 500	1.315

The exchange rate of the Tunisian dinar to the US dollar is 1.00 TND = $0.604 US.

All users, except for the tourism industry, are subject to paying the above variable tariffs. The price of drinking water for the tourism industry is 1.315 DT/m^{3} regardless of consumption.

The fixed part of the tariff depends on the diameter of the water meter.

All drinking water tariffs are subject to an 18% value added tax.

Tariffs are adjusted based on proposals by SONEDE and ONAS to their respective Boards and the government (Ministry of Agriculture, Environment and Hydraulic Resources, and the Ministry of Finance). Sometimes, these requests are refused. Sanitation fees are invoiced and collected by SONEDE. Water and wastewater tariffs were increased by 7 percent in July 2013. It was only the second increase in the last ten years. Tariffs were increased again in September 2016 by about 10 percent on average.

=== Cost recovery ===
SONEDE covers its operation and maintenance costs (and a small fraction of the investment costs) with its revenues. Before the Arab spring, defaulting on water bills was only about 4-5%, but it fell to 30% in the aftermath of the revolution. In 2012 it was back to less than 10%. A quarter of the utilities’ debt is owed by public institutions. SONEDE runs an annual deficit of TND82 million ($50 million). The average cost of a cubic metre is TND0.716 ($0.44) and it is sold at TND0.570 ($0.35). ONAS depends even more on subsidies. For example, the state repays the principal of its loans while ONAS must service only the interest.

=== Investment ===
Public Investments from the budget of the ministry of Agriculture and Hydraulic are composed as following
	Public Investments [MTD]	Part of water sector [MTD]	Percentage Rate [%]
10th Plan (2002–2006)	1975.4	1252.1	63
11th Plan (2007–2011)	2887.9	1580.1	55

The investments of ONAS should go from 390 million TD in the 9th Plan to 525 million TD in the 10th Plan, i.e. an increase of 32%. Compared to the SONEDE investments in the water sector, investment in the sanitation sector remains higher. This is an important point as in the majority of other developing countries sanitation is neglected with respect to water supplies. The corollary is that sanitation prices are high with respect to regional standards, showing a sustained effort in the collection of costs which is absent in almost all other developing countries.

=== Financing ===
Concerning the sector financing, the situation in Tunisia represent is shown in the figure below in MTD.

Financing of Water Sector in Tunisia|
Financing Source	10th Plan (2002-2006)		11th Plan (2007-2011)	
Financing Source	Investments	%	Investments	%
National Budget	947	48	1300	45
External Loans	808	41	1300	45
Grants	150	8	200	7
Self-financing	70	3	28	3
Total	1975	100	2888	100

== External cooperation ==
External partners play a major role in the development of the water and sanitation sector in Tunisia. The French Development Agency AFD, the African Development Bank, the European Investment Bank, the German development bank KfW, the German technical cooperation agency GIZ and the World Bank are among Tunisia's major external partners in the water sector. Since 2000 donors have increasingly financed projects jointly instead of each donor financing projects separately as it had been the case before.

=== Multi-donor projects ===
Water sector investment project (PISEAU). In 2000 the World Bank approved the first water sector investment project (PISEAU) implemented by the Ministry of Agriculture and Water Resources with a total cost of US$258 million. It was financed together with KfW development bank, which contributed US$17.5 million, while the World Bank financed US$103 million. It is not clear how the remaining resources were financed. The main objective of the project was to promote integrated water resources management, together with a better policy for water resources conservation. The project consists of five components: Irrigation management, groundwater management, water conservation and environmental protection, rural drinking water supply, and institutional strengthening and capacity building. The measures taken were expected to significantly improve the productivity of agriculture and increase access to drinking water for rural population. In 2007 the project was concluded.

A follow-up project (PISEAU II) was supported by the African Development Bank with €22.91 million ($31.3 million), as well as by AFD (US$61 million) and the World Bank (US$31 million). The project includes the improvement of conventional as well as non-conventional water sources (reclaimed water and brackish water) in rural areas. Farmers participate in decision-making through Agricultural Development Groups (ADGs) for irrigation and drinking water. The closing date of the project is planned for the year 2015. The total project cost is €122 million ($167.56 million). KfW contributed in 2009 with an amount of 1 Million Euro for tariff studies and measures to strengthen participation by user groups.

Sewage pumping stations and wastewater treatment plants rehabilitation and extension programme. KfW, AFD and the European Commission jointly finance this sanitation programme at a total cost of 81.5 million EUR for 19 wastewater treatment plants and 130 sewage pumping stations in 11 governorates. KfW contributes a EUR 55 million loan, AFD a EUR 18.5 million loan and the EU Commission a EUR 8 million grant. The treated water from some plants will be reused for irrigation.

=== African Development Bank ===
The African Development Bank co-finances projects with other external partners in the water sector (see under multi-donor projects).

=== European Investment Bank ===
ONAS 4 rehabilitation project. In 2006 the European Investment Bank signed the ONAS 4 rehabilitation project. The total cost is EUR 90 million. The project aims to finance the collection and treatment of wastewater in different towns. The treated wastewater will be reused for farming purposes. It supports the upgrading of the primary and secondary networks in Greater Tunis; the expansion and rehabilitation of the sanitation systems in the towns of Monastir, Mahdia, Gabès, Medenine, Tataouine and Gafsa; extension of the South Hammamet treatment plant; construction of three wastewater treatment plants in the towns of Enfidha/Hergla, Menzel Temime and Tazarka/Somâa/ Mâamoura.

=== France ===
The French Development Agency co-finances projects with other external partners in the water sector (see under multi-donor projects).

=== Germany ===
Germany co-finances projects with other external partners in the water sector through financial cooperation projects implemented by KfW.(see under multi-donor projects).

=== World Bank ===
Greater Tunis sewerage and reuse project. In 1997 the World Bank approved the Greater Tunis Sewerage and Reuse project. The total investment amounts to US$107 million. The implementing agencies of the project are ONAS and the Ministry of Agriculture. The project will finance the improvement of urban sewerage services and drinking water supply services. The project promotes the re-use of wastewater for irrigation purposes. Furthermore, the project promotes the reduction of urban pollution and the coastal degradation through the introduction of new technologies and technical assistance. The project concluded in 2005.

Urban water supply project. In 2005 the World Bank approved a US$38 million loan to SONEDE for an urban water supply project in Tunisia. The project objective consists in improving the quality of water in Greater Tunis and other selected urban centres. In order to achieve its objective the project intends to modernize and upgrade the water supply infrastructures and enhance the sustainability of SONEPE activities. The closing date of the project is planned for the year 2012.

Tunis West sewerage. In 2006 the World Bank approved the Tunis West Sewerage project. The investment totals about US$72 million, 67 of which is financed by the World Bank. The project aims to improve the quality of sanitation services in Greater Tunis and of the sewerage sector and promotes reuse of wastewater for irrigation and the improvement of ONAS performance through capacity building. The closing date of the project is planned for the year 2012.

== See also ==
- Sfax Desalination Plant
