= Sustainability metrics and indices =

Measures of sustainability

Sustainability metrics and indices are measures of sustainability, using numbers to quantify environmental, social and economic aspects of the world. There are multiple perspectives on how to measure sustainability as there is no universal standard. Instead, different disciplines and international organizations have offered measures or indicators of how to measure the concept.

While sustainability indicators, indices and reporting systems gained growing popularity in both the public and private sectors, their effectiveness in influencing actual policy and practices often remains limited.

== Metrics and indices ==
Various ways of operationalizing or measuring sustainability have been developed. Since the 2010s, there has been an expansion of interest in Sustainable Development Index (SDI) systems, both in industrialized and, albeit to a lesser extent, in developing countries. SDIs are seen as useful in a wide range of settings, by a wide range of actors: international and intergovernmental bodies; national governments and government departments; economic sectors; administrators of geographic or ecological regions; communities; nongovernmental organizations; and the private sector.

The driving force behind SDI processes is the demand for better, more frequent information with higher temporal and spatial resolution. It is also important to distinguish between relevant and irrelevant data within the context of different policy making decisions.

Alternative aggregate measures for sustainability offer a more detailed view of development than traditional indicators like Gross Domestic Product (GDP). Some examples include: the Ecological Footprint, the UN's Human Development Index (HDI), the Genuine Progress Index (GPI), and the Environmental Sustainability Index (ESI). Alongside these initiatives, there is political interest in producing a green GDP that accounts for resource depletion and pollution. However, due to technical and conceptual difficulties, adoption of a green GDP has been slow.

At the heart of the debate over different indicators are not only different disciplinary approaches but also different views of development. Some indicators reflect the ideology of globalization and urbanization that seek to define and measure progress on whether different countries or cultures agree to accept industrial technologies in their eco-systems. Other approaches, like those that start from international treaties on cultural rights of indigenous peoples to maintain traditional cultures, measure the ability of those cultures to maintain their traditions within their eco-systems at whatever level of productivity they choose.

The Lempert-Nguyen indicator, devised in 2008 for practitioners, starts with the standards for sustainable development that have been agreed upon by the international community and then looks at whether intergovernmental organizations such as the UNDP and other development actors are applying these principles in their projects and work as a whole.

In using sustainability indicators, it is important to distinguish between three types of sustainability that are often mentioned in international development:

- Sustainability of a culture (human system) within its resources and environment;
- Sustainability of a specific stream of benefits or productivity (usually just an economic measure); and
- Sustainability of a particular institution or project without additional assistance (institutionalization of an input).

The following list is not exhaustive but contains the major points of view:

=== "Daly Rules" approach ===
University of Maryland School of Public Policy professor and former Chief Economist for the World Bank Herman E. Daly (working from theory initially developed by Romanian economist Nicholas Georgescu-Roegen and laid out in his 1971 opus "The Entropy Law and the Economic Process") suggested the following three operational rules defining the condition of ecological (thermodynamic) sustainability:

1. Renewable resources such as fish, soil, and groundwater must be used no faster than the rate at which they regenerate.
2. Nonrenewable resources such as minerals and fossil fuels must be used no faster than renewable substitutes for them can be put into place.
3. Pollution and wastes must be emitted no faster than natural systems can absorb them, recycle them, or render them harmless.

Some commentators have argued that the "Daly Rules", based on ecological theory and the Laws of Thermodynamics, should be considered implicit or foundational for the many other systems that are advocated, and are thus the most straightforward system for operationalization of the Bruntland Definition. In this view, the Bruntland Definition and the Daly Rules can be seen as complementary—Bruntland provides the ethical goal of non-depletion of natural capital, Daly details parsimoniously how this ethic is operationalized in physical terms. The system is rationally complete, and in agreement with physical laws. Other definitions may thus be superfluous, or mere glosses on the immutable thermodynamic reality.

There are numerous other definitions and systems of operationalization for sustainability, and there has been competition for influence between them, with the unfortunate result that, in the minds of some observers at least, sustainability has no agreed-upon definition.

=== Natural Step approach ===
Following the Brundtland Commission's report, one of the first initiatives to bring scientific principles to the assessment of sustainability was by Swedish cancer scientist Karl-Henrik Robèrt. Robèrt coordinated a consensus process to define and operationalize sustainability. At the core of the process lies a consensus on what Robèrt came to call the natural step framework. The framework is based on a definition of sustainability, described as the system conditions of sustainability (as derived from System theory). In the natural step framework, a sustainable society does not systematically increase concentrations of substances extracted from the Earth's crust, or substances produced by society; that does not degrade the environment and in which people have the capacity to meet their needs worldwide.

=== Ecological footprint approach ===
Ecological footprint accounting, based on the biological concept of carrying capacity, tracks the amount of land and water area a human population demands for producing the biological resources the population consumes, for absorbing its waste, and for accommodating its built infrastructure, all under prevailing technology. This amount then is compared to available biocapacity, in the world or in that region. The biocapacity represents the area able to regenerate resources and assimilate waste. Global Footprint Network publishes every year results for all nations captured in UN statistics.

The algorithms of ecological footprint accounts have been used in combination with the emergy methodology (S. Zhao, Z. Li and W. Li 2005), and a sustainability index has been derived from the latter. They have also been combined with a measure of quality of life, for instance through the "Happy Planet Index" (HPI) calculated for 178 nations (Marks et al., 2006). The Happy Planet Index calculates how many happy life years each country is able to generate per global hectare of ecological footprint.

One of the striking conclusions to emerge from ecological footprint accounting is that it would be necessary to have 4 or 5 back-up planets engaged in nothing but agriculture for all those alive today to live a western lifestyle. The Footprint analysis is closely related to the I = PAT equation that, itself, can be considered a metric.

=== Anthropological-cultural approach ===
Though sustainable development has become a concept that biologists and ecologists have measured from an eco-system point of view and that the business community has measured from a perspective of energy and resource efficiencies and consumption, the discipline of anthropology is itself founded on the concept of sustainability of human groups within ecological systems. At the basis of the definition of culture is whether a human group is able to transmit its values and continue several aspects of that lifestyle for at least three generations. The measurement of culture, by anthropologists, is itself a measure of sustainability and it is also one that has been codified by international agreements and treaties like the Rio Declaration of 1992 and the United Nations Declaration on the Rights of Indigenous Peoples to maintain a cultural group's choice of lifestyles within their lands and ecosystems.

Terralingua, an organization of anthropologists and linguists working to protect biocultural diversity, with a focus on language, has devised a sert of measures with UNESCO for measuring the survivability of languages and cultures in given eco-systems.

The Lempert–Nguyen indicator of sustainable development, developed in 2008 by David Lempert and Hue Nhu Nguyen, is one that incorporates and integrates these cultural principles with international law.

=== Circles of Sustainability approach ===
A number of agencies including the UN Global Compact Cities Programme, World Vision and Metropolis have since 2010 begun using the Circles of Sustainability approach that sets up a four-domain framework for choosing appropriate indicators. Rather than designating the indicators that have to be used like most other approaches, it provides a framework to guide decision-making on what indicators are most useful. The framework is arranged around four domains - economics, ecology, politics and culture - which are then subdivided into seven analytically derived sub-domains for each domain. Indicators are linked to each sub-domain. By choosing culture as one of its key domains, the approach takes into account the emphasis of the 'Anthropological' approach (above), but retains a comprehensive sense of sustainability. The approach can be used to map any other sustainability indicator set. This is foundationally different from the Global Reporting Initiative Index (below) which uses a triple-bottom-line organizing framework, and is most relevant to corporate reporting.

=== Global Reporting Initiative ===
In 1997 the Global Reporting Initiative (GRI) was started as a multi-stakeholder process and independent institution whose mission has been "to develop and disseminate globally applicable Sustainability Reporting Guidelines". The GRI uses ecological footprint analysis and became independent in 2002. It is an official collaborating centre of the United Nations Environment Programme (UNEP) and during the tenure of Kofi Annan, it cooperated with the UN Secretary-General's Global Compact.

=== Energy, Emergy and Sustainability Index ===
In 1956 Dr. Howard T. Odum of the University of Florida coined the term Emergy and devised the accounting system of embodied energy.

In 1997, systems ecologists M.T. Brown and S. Ulgiati published their formulation of a quantitative Sustainability Index (SI) as a ratio of the emergy (spelled with an "m", i.e. "embodied energy", not simply "energy") yield ratio (EYR) to the environmental loading ratio (ELR). Brown and Ulgiati also called the sustainability index the "Emergy Sustainability Index" (ESI), "an index that accounts for yield, renewability, and environmental load. It is the incremental emergy yield compared to the environmental load".

Sustainability Index = (Emergy Yield Ratio)/(Environmental Loading Ratio) = EYR/ELR

- NOTE: The numerator is called "emergy" and is spelled with an "m". It is an abbreviation of the term, "embodied energy". The numerator is NOT "energy yield ratio", which is a different concept.

Writers like Leone (2005) and Yi et al. have also recently suggested that the emergy sustainability index has significant utility. In particular, Leone notes that while the GRI measures behavior, it fails to calculate supply constraints the emergy methodology aims to calculate.

=== Environmental Sustainability Index ===
In 2004, a joint initiative of the Yale Center for Environmental Law and Policy (YCELP) and the Center for International Earth Science Information Network (CIESIN) of Columbia University, in collaboration with the World Economic Forum and the Directorate-General Joint Research Centre (European Commission) also attempted to construct an Environmental Sustainability Index (ESI). This was formally released in Davos, Switzerland, at the annual meeting of the World Economic Forum (WEF) on 28 January 2005. The report on this index made a comparison of the WEF ESI to other sustainability indicators such as the Ecological footprint Index. However, there was no mention of the emergy sustainability index.

=== IISD Sample Policy Framework ===
In 1996 the International Institute for Sustainable Development (IISD) developed a Sample Policy Framework, which proposed that a sustainability index "...would give decision-makers tools to rate policies and programs against each other" (1996, p. 9). Ravi Jain (2005) argued that, "The ability to analyze different alternatives or to assess progress towards sustainability will then depend on establishing measurable entities or metrics used for sustainability."

=== Sustainability dashboard ===
The International Institute for Sustainable Development has produced a "Dashboard of Sustainability", "a free, non-commercial software package that illustrates the complex relationships among economic, social and environmental issues". This is based on Sustainable Development Indicators Prepared for the United Nations Division for Sustainable Development (UN-DSD)DECEMBER 2005.

=== WBCSD approach ===
The World Business Council for Sustainable Development (WBCSD), founded in 1995, has formulated the business case for sustainable development and argues that "sustainable development is good for business and business is good for sustainable development". This view is also maintained by proponents of the concept of industrial ecology. The theory of industrial ecology declares that industry should be viewed as a series of interlocking man-made ecosystems interfacing with the natural global ecosystem.

According to some economists, it is possible for the concepts of sustainable development and competitiveness to merge if enacted wisely, so that there is not an inevitable trade-off. This merger is motivated by the following six observations (Hargroves & Smith 2005):

1. Throughout the economy there are widespread untapped potential resource productivity improvements to be made to be coupled with effective design.
2. There has been a significant shift in understanding over the last three decades of what creates lasting competitiveness of a firm.
3. There is now a critical mass of enabling technologies in eco-innovations that make integrated approaches to sustainable development economically viable.
4. Since many of the costs of what economists call ‘environmental externalities’ are passed on to governments, in the long-term sustainable development strategies can provide multiple benefits to the tax payer.
5. There is a growing understanding of the multiple benefits of valuing social and natural capital, for both moral and economic reasons, and including them in measures of national well-being.
6. There is mounting evidence to show that a transition to a sustainable economy, if done wisely, may not harm economic growth significantly, in fact it could even help it. Recent research by ex-Wuppertal Institute member Joachim Spangenberg, working with neo-classical economists, shows that the transition, if focused on improving resource productivity, leads to higher economic growth than business as usual, while at the same time reducing pressures on the environment and enhancing employment.

=== Life-cycle assessment ===
Life-cycle assessment is a "composite measure of sustainability". It analyses the environmental performance of products and services through all phases of their life cycle: extracting and processing raw materials; manufacturing, transportation and distribution; use, re-use, maintenance; recycling, and final disposal.

=== Sustainable enterprise approach ===
Building on the work of the World Business Council for Sustainable Development, businesses began to see the needs of environmental and social systems as opportunities for business development and contribution to stakeholder value. This approach has manifested itself in three key areas of strategic intent: 'sustainable innovation', human development, and 'bottom of the pyramid' business strategies. Now, as businesses have begun the shift toward sustainable enterprise, many business schools are leading the research and education of the next generation of business leaders. Companies have introduced key development indicators to set targets and track progress on sustainable development. Some key players are:

- Center for Sustainable Global Enterprise, Cornell University
- Center for Sustainable Enterprise, Stuart School of Business, Illinois Institute of Technology
- Erb Institute, Ross School of Business, University of Michigan
- William Davidson Institute, Ross School of Business, University of Michigan
- Center for Sustainable Enterprise, University of North Carolina, Chapel-Hill
- Community Enterprise System, NABARD–XIMB Sustainability Trust, Center for Case Research, Xavier Institute of Management, Bhubaneswar

=== Sustainable livelihoods approach ===
Another application of the term sustainability has been in the Sustainable Livelihoods Approach, developed from conceptual work by Amartya Sen, and the UK's Institute for Development Studies. This was championed by the UK's Department for International Development (DFID), UNDP, Food and Agriculture Organization (FAO) as well as NGOs such as CARE, OXFAM and the African Institute for Community-Driven Development, Khanya-aicdd. Key concepts include the Sustainable Livelihoods (SL) Framework, a holistic way of understanding livelihoods, the SL principles, as well as six governance issues developed by Khanya-aicdd. A wide range of information resources on Sustainable Livelihoods Approaches can be found at Livelihoods Connect.

Some analysts view this measure with caution because they believe that it has a tendency to take one part of the footprint analysis and I = PAT equation (productivity) and to focus on the sustainability of economic returns to an economic sector rather than on the sustainability of the entire population or culture.

=== FAO types of sustainability ===
The United Nations Food and Agriculture Organization (FAO) has identified three types of sustainability:

- Social sustainability: There must be equity in the distribution of profits and benefits. Demographics like age, gender, and race need to be taken into consideration. Activities of a food system must support health, good nutrition, fair labor practices, animal welfare, and traditions.
- Economic sustainability: The food system must be fiscally or commercially viable for all involved, e.g., workers, governments, consumers, and enterprises.
- Environmental sustainability: Impacts of the food system must have a neutral or positive impact on the natural environment that surrounds it.

Some ecologists have emphasized a fourth type of sustainability:

- Energetic sustainability. This type of sustainability is often concerned with the production of energy and mineral resources. Some researchers have pointed to trends they say document the limits of production. See Hubbert peak for example.

=== "Development sustainability" approaches ===
Sustainability is relevant to international development projects. One definition of development sustainability is "the continuation of benefits after major assistance from the donor has been completed" (Australian Agency for International Development 2000). Ensuring that development projects are sustainable can reduce the likelihood of them collapsing after they have just finished; it also reduces the financial cost of development projects and the subsequent social problems, such as dependence of the stakeholders on external donors and their resources. All development assistance, apart from temporary emergency and humanitarian relief efforts, should be designed and implemented with the aim of achieving sustainable benefits. There are ten key factors that influence development sustainability.

1. Participation and ownership. Get the stakeholders (men and women) to genuinely participate in design and implementation. Build on their initiatives and demands. Get them to monitor the project and periodically evaluate it for results.
2. Capacity building and training. Training stakeholders to take over should begin from the start of any project and continue throughout. The right approach should both motivate and transfer skills to people.
3. Government policies. Development projects should be aligned with local government policies.
4. Financial. In some countries and sectors, financial sustainability is difficult in the medium term. Training in local fundraising is a possibility, as is identifying links with the private sector, charging for use, and encouraging policy reforms.
5. Management and organization. Activities that integrate with or add to local structures may have better prospects for sustainability than those that establish new or parallel structures.
6. Social, gender and culture. The introduction of new ideas, technologies and skills requires an understanding of local decision-making systems, gender divisions and cultural preferences.
7. Technology. All outside equipment must be selected with careful consideration given to the local finance available for maintenance and replacement. Cultural acceptability and the local capacity to maintain equipment and buy spare parts are vital.
8. Environment. Poor rural communities that depend on natural resources should be involved in identifying and managing environmental risks. Urban communities should identify and manage waste disposal and pollution risks.
9. External political and economic factors. In a weak economy, projects should not be too complicated, ambitious or expensive.
10. Realistic duration. A short project may be inadequate for solving entrenched problems in a sustainable way, particularly when behavioural and institutional changes are intended. A long project, may on the other hand, promote dependence.

The definition of sustainability as "the continuation of benefits after major assistance from the donor has been completed" (Australian Agency for International Development 2000) is echoed by other definitions (World Bank, USAID). The concept has however evolved as it has become of interest to non grant-making institutions. Sustainability in development refers to processes and relative increases in local capacity and performance while foreign assistance decreases or shifts (not necessarily disappears). The objective of sustainable development is open to various interpretations.

== See also ==
- Geographic information science
- Geographic information systems
- Infrastructure Sustainability Council of Australia, developer of an infrastructure sustainability rating system
- Intergovernmental Panel on Climate Change
- Land footprint
- Representation theory
- Stern Review
