= Land footprint =

Land footprint is the real amount of land, wherever it is in the world, that is needed to produce a product, or used by an organisation or by a nation.

== Origins ==
Land footprint is a consumption-based indicator that measures the resources needed to create a final product regardless of the country in which the resources are located. This is in contrast to production-based indicators, which measure resource use within a country. For example, cows will require land to graze on within a country, but may also consume feed grown on land in another country. This production vs consumption approach is extensively discussed in greenhouse gas emissions accounting, where carbon footprint is the consumption-based indicator.

== Related concepts ==
Land footprint is closely linked to a number of other concepts, including:

- Ghost acres (or ghost hectares), a term that started to be in use in the 1960s, for example by Georg Borgström in his book "The Hungry Planet: The modern world at the edge of Famine" in 1965, refers to the area of land abroad that is used to grow feed for animals within a country.
- Embedded land or "Virtual land", is the land that is effectively embedded in an imported product; i.e. the land used to produce the product (including any supply chain, such as soya feed for beef).
- Global cropland, as used in the International Resource Panel report on global land use, is part of the total land footprint, but doesn't include e.g. built-up land.
- Indirect land use change, used in the debate on biofuels, is a related concept, that looks at the land needed to grow biofuels, then considers the indirect impacts that this use of land may have on other land use in the country concerned.

Ecological footprint is measured using a different approach, that looks at the biosphere from the perspective of regeneration. On the demand side, it measures regeneration in terms of area needed to provide the amount of regeneration.

- Ecological footprint accounting contrasts demand (expressed in areas needed to provide for the demand) against regeneration (called biocapacity. It thereby combines different demand that compete for biocapacity: space for producing biological resources (crops, fiber, timber), space for absorbing waste (forest to absorb CO_{2} emissions), or space to accommodate urban infrastructure). In contrast, land footprint looks only at direct land use, and does not include the carbon footprint.
- Ecological footprint and biocapacity are expressed in global hectares, hectares that are adjusted for the hectares biological productivity. In contrast, land footprint is expressed in hectares.

== Research ==
The International Resource Panel has produced a detailed report on land, "Assessing global land use: Balancing consumption with sustainable supply", which establishes a planetary boundary for cropland, and proposes a potential safe operating space target of 0.2 ha of cropland per person per year. This is in contrast to the current EU use of cropland of around 0.31 ha per person per year.

The most detailed study of Europe's land footprint (including forestry) and how this is traded with the rest of the work was published by Sustainable European Research Institute (SERI) in 2011. A briefing on this study is available from Friends of the Earth Europe.

A study of Germany's land balance modelled the impact of changes in diet and consumption of stimulants (e.g. coffee, wine etc.) on Germany's land balance. It found that a switch to a healthier diet, with less meat and with reduced stimulants, could lead to no net land imports, while a switch to vegetarian or vegan diets would lead to Germany being a net exporter of land.

Sustainable Europe Research Institute have also examined potential scenarios for reducing Europe's land footprint, including dietary changes.

== In policy ==
The EU's 7th Environmental action plan calls for examination of land (and other) footprints:

"To set a framework for action to improve resource efficiency aspects beyond GHG emissions and energy, targets for reducing the overall lifecycle environmental impact of consumption will be set.. Indicators and targets for land, water, material and carbon footprints as well as their role within the European Semester should also be considered in this regard."

The European Parliament's own initiative report on "Resource efficiency: moving towards a circular economy", which was voted on 9 July 2015, includes the following text calling for action from the European Commission on land and other footprints:

"Urges the Commission to propose, by the end of 2015, a lead indicator and a dashboard of sub-indicators on resource efficiency, including ecosystem services; points out that the use of these harmonised indicators should be legally binding as of 2018, and they should measure resource consumption, including imports and exports, at EU, Member State and industry level and take account of the whole lifecycle of products and services and should be based on the footprint methodology, measuring at least land, water and material use and carbon;"

A study of the four resource footprint indicators, carried for the European Commission examined what data was available to measure the land footprint, carbon footprint, water footprint & material footprint at economy level. This study concluded that Land Footprint needed methodological improvement and harmonisation, and that a common, international, multi-regional input output database would make it easier to calculate all four footprints.

Friends of the Earth Europe, together with a wider Land Footprint Coalition, has been advocating for Land Footprint to be used to measure resource consumption, as part of a wider project that argues that four footprints - land, water, carbon & material (equivalent to either RMC or TMC, see Material Flow Accounting) - are an effective way of measuring & managing Europe's resource use. The coalition, which includes Slow Food Europe and Birdlife, are also calling for Europe to reduce its land footprint.

== See also ==
- Land conversion
- Land loss
