= List of countries by ecological footprint =

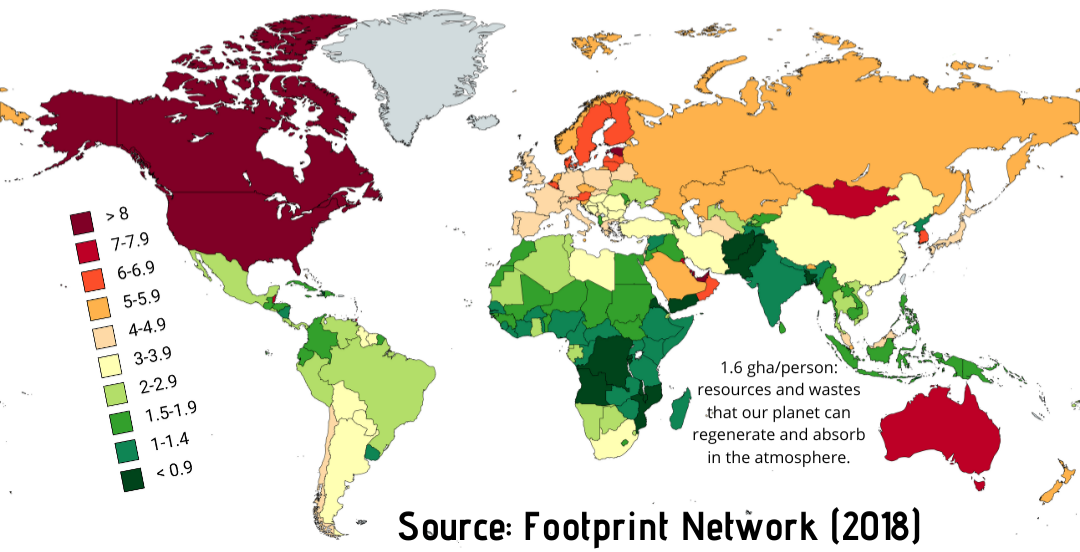
Countries by sheer ecological footprint per capita (2018)

National ecological surplus or deficit, measured as a country's biocapacity per person (in global hectares) minus its ecological footprint per person (also in global hectares). Data from 2013.: x ≤ −9 −9 < x ≤ −8 −8 < x ≤ −7 −7 < x ≤ −6 −6 < x ≤ −5 / −5 < x ≤ −4 −4 < x ≤ −3 −3 < x ≤ −2 −2 < x ≤ −1 −1 < x < 0 / 0 ≤ x < 2 2 ≤ x < 4 4 ≤ x < 6 6 ≤ x < 8 8 ≤ x Data unavailable

This is a list of countries by ecological footprint. The table is based on data spanning from 1961 to 2013 from the Global Footprint Network's National Footprint Accounts published in 2016. Numbers are given in global hectares per capita. The world-average ecological footprint in 2016 was 2.75 global hectares per person (22.6 billion in total). With a world-average biocapacity of 1.63 global hectares (gha) per person (12.2 billion in total), this leads to a global ecological deficit of 1.1 global hectares per person (10.4 billion in total).

For humanity, having a footprint smaller than the planet's biocapacity is a necessary condition for sustainability. After all, ecological overuse is only possible temporarily. A country that consumes more than 1.73 gha per person has a resource demand that is not sustainable world-wide if every country were to exceed that consumption level simultaneously. Countries with a footprint below 1.73 gha per person might not be sustainable: the quality of the footprint may still lead to net long-term ecological destruction. If a country does not have enough ecological resources within its own territory to cover its population's footprint, then it runs an ecological deficit and the country is termed an ecological debtor. Otherwise, it has an ecological reserve and it is called a creditor. To a significant degree, biocapacity correlates with access to water resources.

== Countries and regions ==
The table below is based on 2025 results produced by York University, Footprint Data Foundation, and Global Footprint Network, is available on Global Footprint Network's website.

Rank	Country/region	Ecological footprint	Biocapacity	Biocapacity deficit or reserve	Population (millions)	Total biocapacity deficit or reserve (gMha)	Population (millions) for biocapacity to equal ecological footprint*
Rank	Country/region	(gha/person)			Population (millions)	Total biocapacity deficit or reserve (gMha)	Population (millions) for biocapacity to equal ecological footprint*
	World	2.51	1.48	−1.03	8231.61	−8518.35	4839.101287
1	Qatar	11.73	0.83	−10.90	3.12	−33.96	0.221140
2	Luxembourg	10.12	1.20	−8.92	0.68	−6.07	0.080430
3	Mongolia	7.53	12.49	4.96	3.52	17.46	5.836978
4	United States	7.05	3.68	−3.37	347.28	−1170.71	181.285561
5	Estonia	6.67	9.23	2.56	1.34	3.45	1.861147
6	Canada	6.62	13.46	6.84	40.13	274.56	81.587732
7	Latvia	6.52	8.92	2.40	1.85	4.45	2.536771
8	Denmark	6.45	3.71	−2.74	6.00	−16.42	3.454800
9	Lithuania	5.71	5.41	−0.30	2.83	−0.86	2.679932
10	Malta	5.66	0.42	−5.24	0.55	−2.86	0.040130
11	Slovenia	5.39	2.43	−2.96	2.12	−6.26	0.955760
12	Russia	5.39	7.38	1.98	144.00	285.61	196.960710
13	Austria	5.38	2.76	−2.62	9.11	−23.90	4.669472
14	South Korea	5.11	0.65	−4.45	51.67	−230.18	6.585580
15	Czech Republic	5.05	2.52	−2.53	10.61	−26.85	5.297189
16	Sweden	5.05	8.21	3.16	10.66	33.70	17.335631
17	Oman	4.94	1.30	−3.65	5.49	−20.05	1.440226
18	Montenegro	4.93	2.64	−2.29	0.63	−1.45	0.338738
19	Belgium	4.82	0.98	−3.83	11.76	−45.06	2.401609
20	Bhutan	4.77	4.64	−0.14	0.80	−0.11	0.774108
21	Croatia	4.76	2.55	−2.20	3.85	−8.48	2.064838
22	Antigua and Barbuda	4.72	0.94	−3.79	0.09	−0.36	0.018708
23	Barbados	4.49	0.28	−4.21	0.28	−1.19	0.017659
24	France	4.45	2.50	−1.95	66.69	−129.95	37.490296
25	Norway	4.41	6.40	1.99	5.62	11.19	8.162598
26	Poland	4.34	2.10	−2.24	38.14	−85.38	18.448787
27	Portugal	4.26	1.62	−2.64	10.41	−27.53	3.951264
28	Serbia	4.25	2.14	−2.11	6.69	−14.12	3.364611
29	Turkmenistan	4.23	1.96	−2.27	7.62	−17.32	3.527422
30	Belarus	4.12	3.59	−0.53	9.00	−4.76	7.842618
31	Malaysia	4.11	1.91	−2.21	35.98	−79.35	16.677860
32	Slovakia	4.02	2.78	−1.24	5.47	−6.77	3.790600
33	Cyprus	4.00	0.29	−3.71	1.37	−5.08	0.100254
34	Israel	3.98	0.19	−3.79	9.52	−36.06	0.463947
35	Italy	3.97	0.98	−2.99	59.18	−176.93	14.612295
36	Mauritius	3.96	0.76	−3.20	1.27	−4.06	0.242562
37	Japan	3.94	0.67	−3.26	123.10	−401.73	21.031796
38	Switzerland	3.87	1.06	−2.80	8.97	−25.15	2.465440
39	Germany	3.78	1.60	−2.18	84.08	−183.18	35.586950
40	Tonga	3.76	1.48	−2.28	0.10	−0.24	0.040841
41	Chile	3.76	3.11	−0.65	19.86	−12.91	16.425625
42	China	3.76	0.79	−2.96	1447.33	−4289.12	305.721474
43	Grenada	3.68	1.85	−1.83	0.12	−0.22	0.058899
44	Greece	3.56	1.42	−2.13	9.94	−21.21	3.975530
45	Serbia and Montenegro	3.42	1.49	−1.93	8.17	−15.80	3.557198
46	United Kingdom	3.41	1.08	−2.33	69.55	−162.20	21.966696
47	North Macedonia	3.39	1.72	−1.66	1.81	−3.02	0.922973
48	Turkey	3.18	1.51	−1.67	87.69	−146.34	41.689539
49	Spain	3.18	1.23	−1.95	47.89	−93.42	18.475528
50	Fiji	3.12	2.42	−0.70	0.93	−0.65	0.724731
51	Romania	3.05	2.61	−0.44	18.91	−8.40	16.153620
52	Saint Lucia	2.72	0.42	−2.30	0.18	−0.41	0.027914
53	Argentina	2.67	4.88	2.21	45.85	101.26	83.797838
54	Mexico	2.65	1.17	−1.48	131.95	−195.09	58.228855
55	Costa Rica	2.62	1.45	−1.16	5.15	−6.00	2.860089
56	Bolivia	2.57	12.88	10.31	12.58	129.66	62.947930
57	South Africa	2.56	1.16	−1.40	64.75	−90.76	29.286608
58	Thailand	2.46	1.12	−1.34	71.62	−95.85	32.687269
59	Brazil	2.44	8.10	5.65	212.81	1203.36	705.284702
60	Albania	2.40	1.11	−1.29	2.77	−3.59	1.277751
61	Paraguay	2.37	8.78	6.41	7.01	44.94	25.937438
62	Peru	2.32	3.45	1.13	34.58	39.03	51.407059
63	Dominican Republic	2.30	0.73	−1.58	11.52	−18.17	3.630005
64	Vietnam	2.30	0.91	−1.39	101.60	−141.42	40.046807
65	Uzbekistan	2.30	0.81	−1.49	37.05	−55.21	12.996733
66	Samoa	2.29	1.35	−0.94	0.22	−0.21	0.129254
67	Lebanon	2.16	0.32	−1.84	5.85	−10.78	0.867507
68	El Salvador	2.15	0.54	−1.62	6.37	−10.29	1.587431
69	Botswana	2.15	2.84	0.69	2.56	1.76	3.380019
70	Iraq	2.02	0.29	−1.73	47.02	−81.19	6.782035
71	Jamaica	1.95	0.52	−1.43	2.84	−4.05	0.760078
72	Venezuela	1.93	2.90	0.97	28.52	27.73	42.917842
73	Ghana	1.90	0.99	−0.91	35.06	−31.85	18.306574
74	Central African Republic	1.89	6.94	5.05	5.51	27.84	20.211380
75	Colombia	1.85	3.08	1.23	53.43	65.70	88.999124
76	Eswatini	1.82	0.78	−1.04	1.26	−1.31	0.536019
77	Guinea	1.75	1.77	0.02	15.10	0.32	15.284029
78	Cuba	1.70	1.09	−0.61	10.94	−6.71	6.992923
79	Indonesia	1.66	1.15	−0.51	285.72	−146.28	197.561452
80	Tunisia	1.63	0.72	−0.90	12.35	−11.16	5.495216
81	Cambodia	1.58	1.07	−0.51	17.85	−9.12	12.089206
82	Senegal	1.50	0.93	−0.57	18.93	−10.72	11.761840
83	Liberia	1.45	2.50	1.04	5.73	5.98	9.847139
84	Jordan	1.38	0.16	−1.22	11.52	−14.04	1.312263
85	Philippines	1.37	0.43	−0.94	116.79	−109.75	36.700138
86	Egypt	1.36	0.26	−1.10	118.37	−130.76	22.342758
87	Sri Lanka	1.27	0.54	−0.73	23.23	−16.90	9.935570
88	Sudan	1.27	1.35	0.08	51.66	4.08	54.880392
89	Zimbabwe	1.24	0.62	−0.63	16.95	−10.62	8.398369
90	Niger	1.17	0.90	−0.27	27.92	−7.59	21.458269
91	Chad	1.17	1.14	−0.02	21.00	−0.52	20.558845
92	Ivory Coast	1.15	1.32	0.17	32.71	5.57	37.556751
93	Burkina Faso	1.14	0.78	−0.35	24.07	−8.44	16.637917
94	India	1.13	0.38	−0.75	1463.87	−1098.20	492.302190
95	Palestine	1.11	0.17	−0.94	5.59	−5.28	0.838386
96	Zambia	1.11	1.42	0.31	21.91	6.73	27.983762
97	Myanmar	1.10	1.34	0.24	54.85	12.93	66.608254
98	Mali	1.10	1.27	0.18	25.20	4.41	29.219395
99	Togo	1.07	0.51	−0.55	9.72	−5.38	4.675149
100	Uganda	1.06	0.53	−0.54	51.38	−27.61	25.437502
101	Benin	1.04	0.57	−0.47	14.81	−6.94	8.150020
102	Tajikistan	1.03	0.44	−0.59	10.79	−6.34	4.646024
103	Cameroon	1.03	1.33	0.30	29.88	9.00	38.641597
104	Kenya	0.99	0.51	−0.49	57.53	−28.04	29.284970
105	Sierra Leone	0.97	0.77	−0.20	8.82	−1.78	6.990221
106	Congo	0.97	7.16	6.19	6.48	40.12	47.845228
107	Tanzania	0.97	0.76	−0.21	70.55	−14.83	55.214756
108	Laos	0.94	1.51	0.57	7.87	4.50	12.656726
109	Bangladesh	0.91	0.32	−0.59	175.69	−102.94	62.049110
110	Timor-Leste	0.89	1.47	0.57	1.42	0.81	2.328835
111	Nepal	0.89	0.41	−0.47	29.62	−14.03	13.802626
112	Ethiopia	0.88	0.48	−0.40	135.47	−53.54	74.405423
113	Rwanda	0.81	0.40	−0.41	14.57	−6.05	7.142751
114	Somalia	0.80	0.60	−0.20	19.65	−3.92	14.774768
115	Syria	0.80	0.48	−0.33	25.62	−8.33	15.212753
116	Malawi	0.78	0.62	−0.16	22.22	−3.54	17.691953
117	Afghanistan	0.77	0.50	−0.27	43.84	−12.03	28.273890
118	Nigeria	0.74	0.41	−0.32	237.53	−77.12	133.156445
119	Pakistan	0.72	0.41	−0.31	255.22	−79.85	144.685542
120	Eritrea	0.71	1.92	1.20	3.61	4.34	9.682040
121	Angola	0.71	1.24	0.53	39.04	20.77	68.413482
122	Madagascar	0.67	1.73	1.05	32.74	34.53	84.059142
123	Congo, Democratic Republic of	0.65	1.59	0.94	112.83	105.95	276.617174
124	Haiti	0.62	0.23	−0.39	11.91	−4.70	4.374327
125	Burundi	0.62	0.38	−0.24	14.39	−3.48	8.750647
126	Mozambique	0.59	1.24	0.65	35.63	23.12	74.964870
127	Yemen	0.51	0.28	−0.24	41.77	−9.82	22.659941

*Assumes that biocapacity and ecological footprint per person will not change when population changes.

== See also ==
World map of countries by their raw ecological footprint compared against the global average biocapacity of 2.1 gha per person in 2007.

- List of countries by carbon dioxide emissions per capita
- Sustainable development
- List of countries by inequality-adjusted Human Development Index
- Peak water, water resources and water withdrawal
