= Climatarian diet =

Diet focused on reducing climate footprint

Climatarian diet is a diet focused on reducing the climate footprint.

== Etymology ==
The term first appeared around the mid-2010s, with The New York Times including it on its list of new food-related words in 2015, where it was defined as "a diet whose primary goal is to reverse climate change". The word itself is a portmanteau of the noun "climate" and the splinter word "-tarian", which has come to refer to someone with a dietary restriction.

== Suggested ways reduce dietary carbon footprint ==
Climate-centered diets do not involve strict rules so much as mindfulness about food production, such as where food comes from, and where it goes. The Core Principles involve eating locally, reducing meat consumption or choosing lower-impact meats, and eliminating food waste wherever possible. Suggestions include:

- Eat "land-efficient" foods
- Eat less feedlot beef
- Buy local
- Buy organic
- Eat drought-hardy crops
- Cut down on food waste

== Motivation ==
The climatarian diet is supposed to carry dual benefits for the consumers as well as for those who want to enjoy healthy diets, but also for the planet as a whole, by reducing the climate impact of food production. Proponents of climatarianism claim that the diet is based on clear scientific data, as it seeks to reduce the consumption of those foods that are identified as the largest emitters of greenhouse gases responsible for climate change.

One of the main ways in which climatarians strive to make their food consumption less environmentally harmful is by avoiding eating beef and lamb.

According to a 2014 study, "beef used 28 times more land, 11 times more water and emitted five times more greenhouse gases than the production of either pork, poultry, dairy or eggs." It has also been calculated that the carbon footprint of beef is well over the equivalent of 20,000 g of CO_{2} per kilo, while fish is just under 4,500 g, and poultry is around 4,000 g. Beans and dried fruit are under the equivalent of 2,000 g of CO_{2} per kilo, while vegetables and seasonal fruit use less than 1,000 g.

Other goals of the climatarian diet consist of eating many vegetables, choosing locally produced food and using all parts of an animal when eating meat, in order to reduce waste.

== Climatarian app ==
In 2016, the Australian climate group Less Meat Less Heat launched a crowdfunding campaign in order to develop an app that will make it easier for consumers to eat in an environmental-conscious way. The app was launched in November 2016 and is meant to encourage users to reduce their food-based footprint to less than 80 kilograms of carbon per month.
