= Carbon footprint =

Concept for greenhouse gas emissions analysis

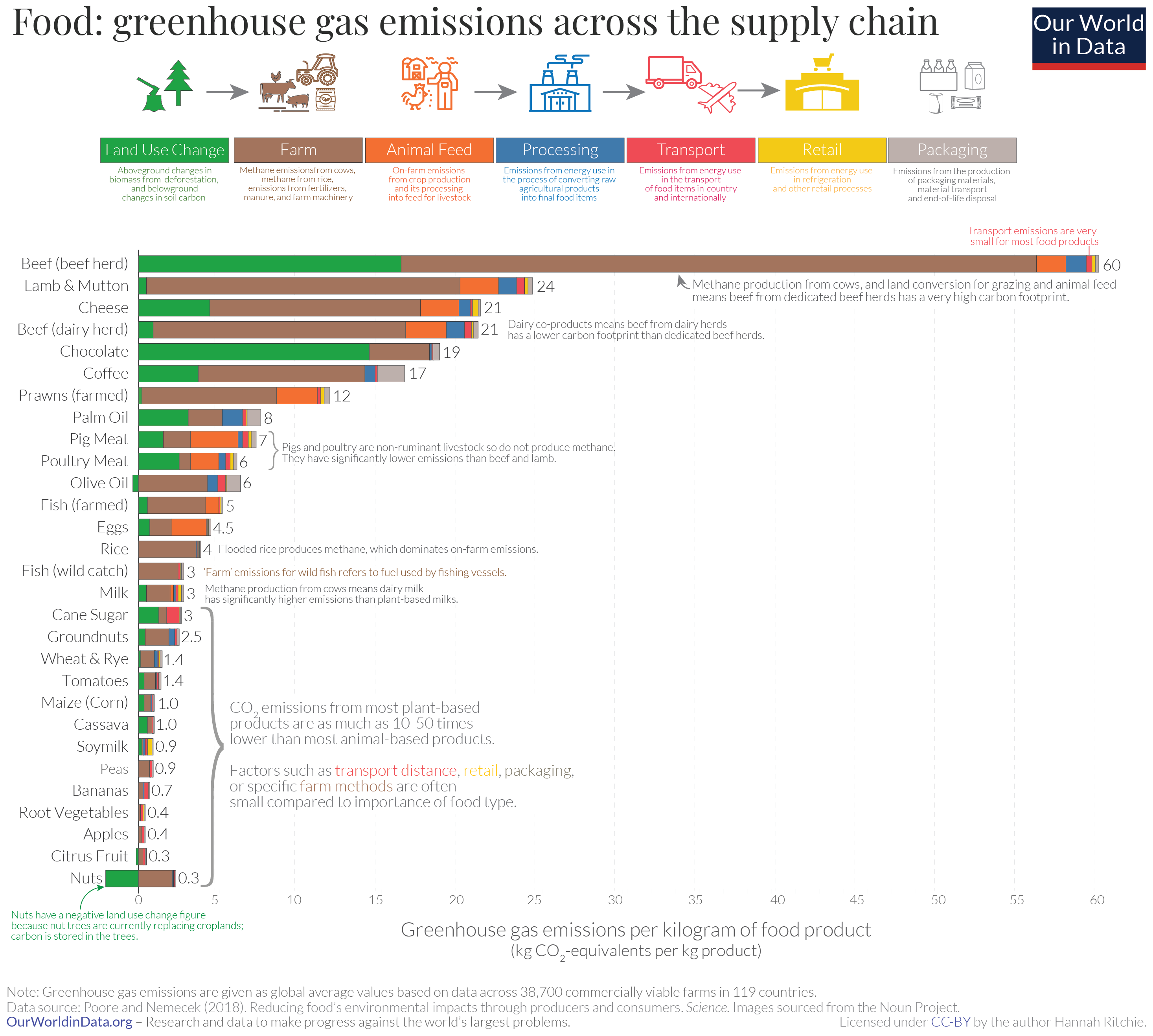
The carbon footprint can be used to compare the climate change impact of many things. The example given here is the carbon footprint (greenhouse gas emissions) of food across the supply chain caused by land use change, farm, animal feed, processing, transport, retail, packing, losses.

A carbon footprint (or greenhouse gas footprint) is a calculated value or index that allows the comparison of the total amount of greenhouse gases that an activity, product, company or country adds to the atmosphere.

An organization's carbon footprint includes the direct and indirect emissions it causes. The Greenhouse Gas Protocol (for carbon accounting of organizations) calls these Scope 1, 2 and 3 emissions. There are several methodologies and online tools to calculate the carbon footprint. They depend on whether the focus is on a country, organization, product or individual person. For example, the carbon footprint of a product could help consumers decide which product to buy if they want to be climate aware. For climate change mitigation activities, the carbon footprint can help distinguish those economic activities with a high footprint from those with a low footprint. So the carbon footprint concept allows everyone to make comparisons between the climate impacts of individuals, products, companies and countries. It also helps people devise strategies and priorities for reducing the carbon footprint.

The carbon dioxide equivalent (CO_{2}eq) emissions per unit of comparison sums up all greenhouse gas emissions. It includes all greenhouse gases—not just carbon dioxide—and it looks at emissions from economic activities, events, organizations and services. In some definitions, only the carbon dioxide emissions are taken into account. These do not include other greenhouse gases such as methane and nitrous oxide.

For countries, it is common to use consumption-based emissions accounting to calculate their carbon footprint for a given year. Consumption-based accounting using input-output analysis backed by super-computing makes it possible to analyze global supply chains. Countries also prepare national GHG inventories for the UNFCCC. The GHG emissions listed in those national inventories are only from activities in the country itself. This approach is called territorial-based accounting or production-based accounting. It does not take into account production of goods and services imported on behalf of residents. Consumption-based accounting does reflect emissions from goods and services imported from other countries.

Consumption-based accounting is therefore more comprehensive. This comprehensive carbon footprint reporting including Scope 3 emissions deals with gaps in current systems. Countries' GHG inventories for the UNFCCC do not include international transport. Comprehensive carbon footprint reporting looks at the final demand for emissions, to where the consumption of the goods and services takes place.For organizations it is common practice to use the Greenhouse Gas Protocol. The term was originally popularized in through a 2005 marketing campaign funded by BP whose purpose was to more strictly tie the responsibility of carbon emissions to individual consumers.

== Definition ==
The carbon footprint explained

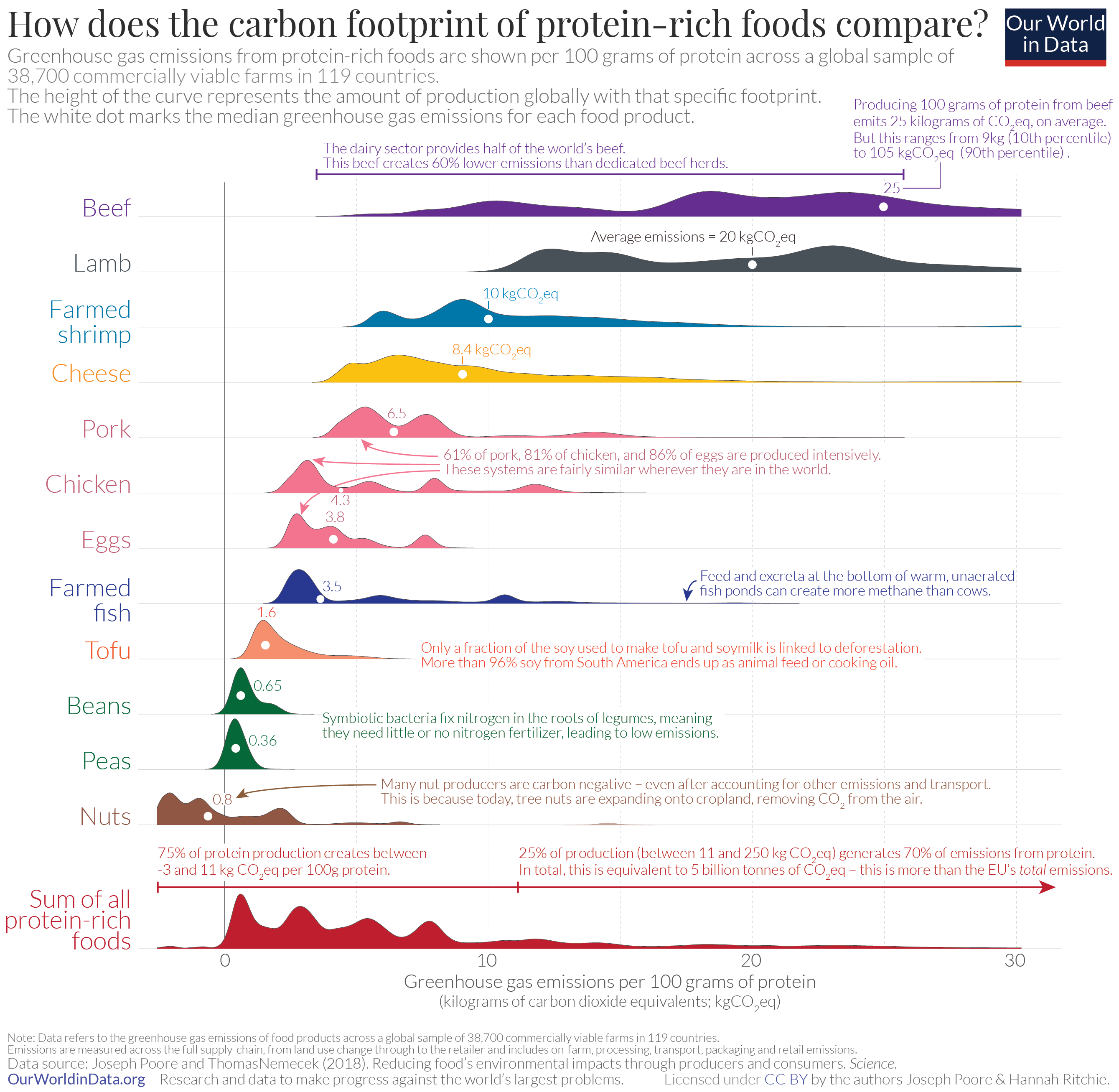
Comparison of the carbon footprint of protein-rich foods

A formal definition of carbon footprint is as follows: "A measure of the total amount of carbon dioxide (CO_{2}) and methane (CH_{4}) emissions of a defined population, system or activity, considering all relevant sources, sinks and storage within the spatial and temporal boundary of the population, system or activity of interest. Calculated as carbon dioxide equivalent using the relevant 100-year global warming potential (GWP100)."

Carbon footprints are usually reported in tonnes of emissions (CO_{2}-equivalent) per unit of comparison. Such units can be, for example, tonnes CO_{2}-eq per year, per kilogram of protein for consumption, per kilometer travelled, per piece of clothing and so forth. A product's carbon footprint includes the emissions for the entire life cycle. These run from the production along the supply chain to its final consumption and disposal.

Scientists report carbon footprints in terms of equivalents of tonnes of CO_{2} emissions (CO_{2}-equivalent). They may report them per year, per person, per kilogram of protein, per kilometer travelled, and so on.

In the definition of carbon footprint, some scientists include only CO_{2.} But more commonly they include several of the notable greenhouse gases. They can compare various greenhouse gases by using carbon dioxide equivalents over a relevant time scale, like 100 years. Some organizations use the term greenhouse gas footprint or climate footprint to emphasize that all greenhouse gases are included, not just carbon dioxide.

The Greenhouse Gas Protocol includes all of the most important greenhouse gases. "The standard covers the accounting and reporting of seven greenhouse gases covered by the Kyoto Protocol – carbon dioxide (CO_{2}), methane (CH_{4}), nitrous oxide (N_{2}O), hydrofluorocarbons (HFCs), perfluorocarbons (PCFs), sulfur hexafluoride (SF_{6}) and nitrogen trifluoride (NF_{3})."

In comparison, the IPCC definition of carbon footprint in 2022 covers only carbon dioxide. It defines the carbon footprint as the "measure of the exclusive total amount of emissions of carbon dioxide (CO_{2}) that is directly and indirectly caused by an activity or is accumulated over the lifecycle stages of a product." The IPCC report's authors adopted the same definition that had been proposed in 2007 in the UK. That publication included only carbon dioxide in the definition of carbon footprint. It justified this with the argument that other greenhouse gases were more difficult to quantify. This is because of their differing global warming potentials. They also stated that an inclusion of all greenhouse gases would make the carbon footprint indicator less practical. But there are disadvantages to this approach. One disadvantage of not including methane is that some products or sectors that have a high methane footprint such as livestock appear less harmful for the climate than they actually are.

== Types of greenhouse gas emissions ==
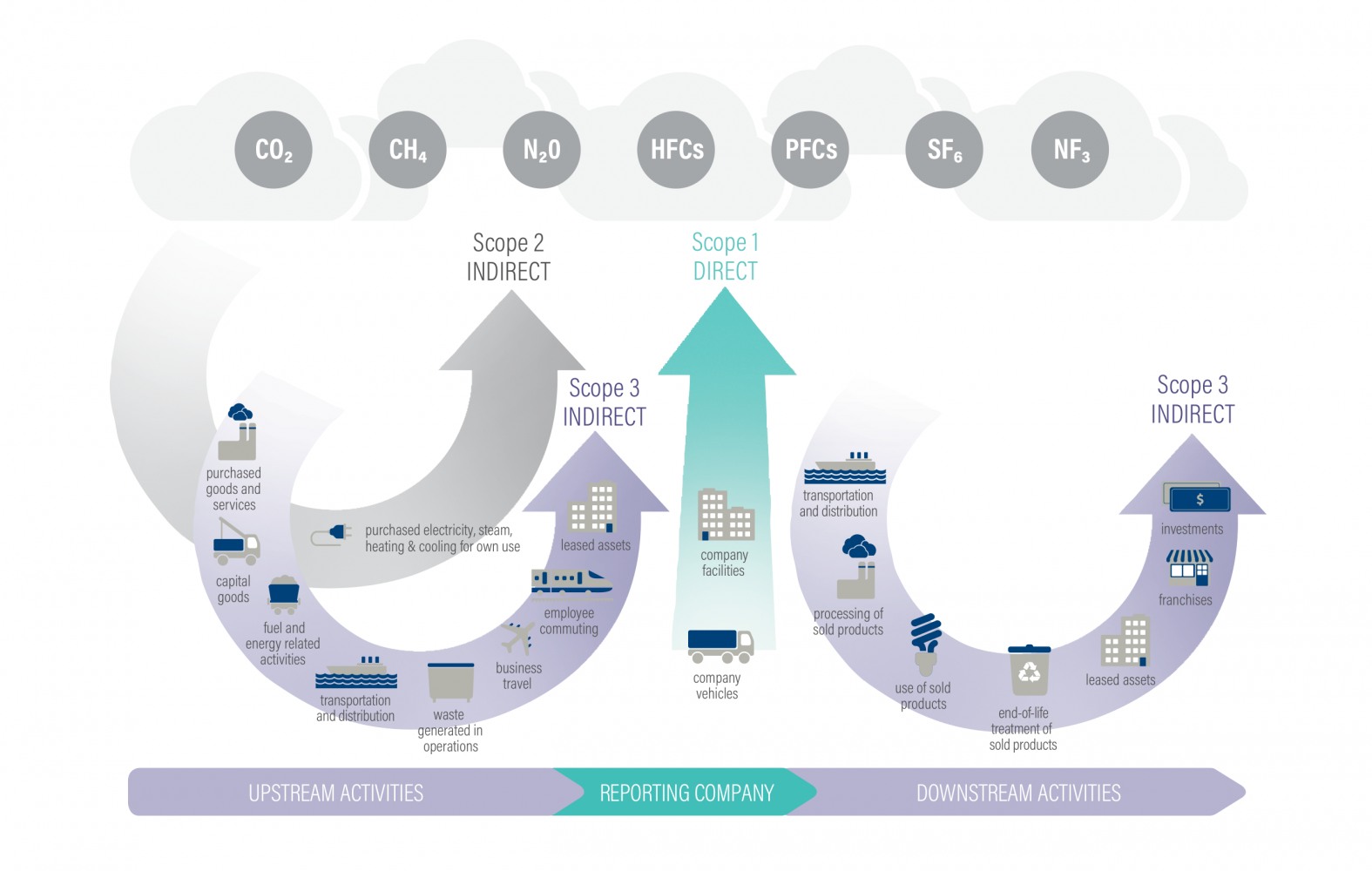
Overview of Greenhouse Gas Protocol scopes and emissions across the value chain, showing upstream activities, reporting company and downstream activities.

The greenhouse gas protocol is a set of standards for tracking greenhouse gas emissions. The standards divide emissions into three scopes (Scope 1, 2 and 3) within the value chain. Greenhouse gas emissions caused directly by the organization such as by burning fossil fuels are referred to as Scope 1. Emissions caused indirectly by an organization, such as by purchasing secondary energy sources like electricity, heat, cooling or steam are called Scope 2. Lastly, indirect emissions associated with upstream or downstream processes are called Scope 3.

=== Direct carbon emissions (Scope 1) ===
Direct or Scope 1 carbon emissions come from sources on the site that is producing a product or delivering a service. An example for industry would be the emissions from burning a fuel on site. On the individual level, emissions from personal vehicles or gas-burning stoves are Scope 1.

=== Indirect carbon emissions (Scope 2) ===
Indirect carbon emissions are emissions from sources upstream or downstream from the process being studied. They are also known as Scope 2 or Scope 3 emissions.

Scope 2 emissions are the indirect emissions related to purchasing electricity, heat, or steam used on site. Examples of upstream carbon emissions include transportation of materials and fuels, any energy used outside of the production facility, and waste produced outside the production facility. Examples of downstream carbon emissions include any end-of-life process or treatments, product and waste transportation, and emissions associated with selling the product. The GHG Protocol says it is important to calculate upstream and downstream emissions. There could be some double counting. This is because upstream emissions of one person's consumption patterns could be someone else's downstream emissions

=== Other indirect carbon emissions (Scope 3) ===
Scope 3 emissions are all other indirect emissions derived from the activities of an organization. But they are from sources they do not own or control. The GHG Protocol's Corporate Value Chain (Scope 3) Accounting and Reporting Standard allows companies to assess their entire value chain emissions impact and identify where to focus reduction activities.

Scope 3 emission sources include emissions from suppliers and product users. These are also known as the value chain. Transportation of goods, and other indirect emissions are also part of this scope. In 2022 about 30% of US companies reported Scope 3 emissions. The International Sustainability Standards Board is developing a recommendation to include Scope 3 emissions in all GHG reporting.

== Purpose and strengths ==
Are consumption-based CO₂ per capita emissions above or below the global average

The current rise in global average temperature is more rapid than previous changes. It is primarily caused by humans burning fossil fuels. The increase in greenhouse gases in the atmosphere is also due to deforestation and agricultural and industrial practices. These include cement production. The two most notable greenhouse gases are carbon dioxide and methane. Greenhouse gas emissions, and hence humanity's carbon footprint, have been increasing during the 21st century. The Paris Agreement aims to reduce greenhouse gas emissions enough to limit the rise in global temperature to no more than 1.5 °C above pre-industrial levels.

The carbon footprint concept makes comparisons between the climate impacts of individuals, products, companies and countries. A carbon footprint label on products could enable consumers to choose products with a lower carbon footprint if they want to help limit climate change. For meat products, as an example, such a label could make it clear that beef has a higher carbon footprint than chicken.

Understanding the size of an organization's carbon footprint makes it possible to devise a strategy to reduce it. For most businesses the vast majority of emissions do not come from activities on site, known as Scope 1, or from energy supplied to the organization, known as Scope 2, but from Scope 3 emissions, the extended upstream and downstream supply chain. Therefore, ignoring Scope 3 emissions makes it impossible to detect all emissions of importance, which limits options for mitigation. Large companies in sectors such as clothing or automobiles would need to examine more than 100,000 supply chain pathways to fully report their carbon footprints.

The importance of displacement of carbon emissions has been known for some years. Scientists also call this carbon leakage. The idea of a carbon footprint addresses concerns of carbon leakage which the Paris Agreement does not cover. Carbon leakage occurs when importing countries outsource production to exporting countries. The outsourcing countries are often rich countries while the exporters are often low-income countries. Countries can make it appear that their GHG emissions are falling by moving "dirty" industries abroad, even if their emissions could be increasing when looked at from a consumption perspective.

Carbon leakage and related international trade have a range of environmental impacts. These include increased air pollution, water scarcity, biodiversity loss, raw material usage, and energy depletion.

Scholars have argued in favour of using both consumption-based and production-based accounting. This helps establish shared producer and consumer responsibility. Currently countries report on their annual GHG inventory to the UNFCCC based on their territorial emissions. This is known as the territorial-based or production-based approach. Including consumption-based calculations in the UNFCCC reporting requirements would help close loopholes by addressing the challenge of carbon leakage.

The Paris Agreement currently does not require countries to include in their national totals GHG emissions associated with international transport. These emissions are reported separately. They are not subject to the limitation and reduction commitments of Annex 1 Parties under the Climate Convention and Kyoto Protocol. The carbon footprint methodology includes GHG emissions associated with international transport, thereby assigning emissions caused by international trade to the importing country.

== Underlying concepts for calculations ==
The calculation of the carbon footprint of a product, service or sector requires expert knowledge and careful examination of what is to be included. Carbon footprints can be calculated at different scales. They can apply to whole countries, cities, neighborhoods and also sectors, companies and products. Several free online carbon footprint calculators exist to calculate personal carbon footprints.

Software such as the "Scope 3 Evaluator" can help companies report emissions throughout their value chain. The software tools can help consultants and researchers to model global sustainability footprints. In each situation there are a number of questions that need to be answered. These include which activities are linked to which emissions, and which proportion should be attributed to which company. Software is essential for company management. But there is a need for new ways of enterprise resource planning to improve corporate sustainability performance.

To achieve 95% carbon footprint coverage, it would be necessary to assess 12 million individual supply-chain contributions. This is based on analyzing 12 sectoral case studies. The Scope 3 calculations can be made easier using input-output analysis. This is a technique originally developed by Nobel Prize-winning economist Wassily Leontief.

=== Consumption-based emission accounting based on input-output analysis ===
Consumption-based vs. production-based CO₂ emissions per capita

Production vs. consumption-based CO₂ emissions for the United States

Production vs. consumption-based CO₂ emissions per capita for China

Consumption-based emission accounting traces the impacts of demand for goods and services along the global supply chain to the end-consumer. It is also called consumption-based carbon accounting. In contrast, a production-based approach to calculating GHG emissions is not a carbon footprint analysis. This approach is also called a territorial-based approach. The production-based approach includes only impacts physically produced in the country in question. Consumption-based accounting redistributes the emissions from production-based accounting. It considers that emissions in another country are necessary for the home country's consumption bundle.

Consumer-based accounting is based on input-output analysis. It is used at the highest levels for any economic research question related to environmental or social impacts. Analysis of global supply chains is possible using consumption-based accounting with input-output analysis assisted by super-computing capacity.

Leontief created Input-output analysis (IO) to demonstrate the relationship between consumption and production in an economy. It incorporates the entire supply chain. It uses input-output tables from countries' national accounts. It also uses international data such as UN Comtrade and Eurostat. Input-output analysis has been extended globally to multi-regional input-output analysis (MRIO). Innovations and technology enabling the analysis of billions of supply chains made this possible. Standards set by the United Nations underpin this analysis. The analysis enables a Structural Path Analysis. This scans and ranks the top supply chain nodes and paths. It conveniently lists hotspots for urgent action. Input-output analysis has increased in popularity because of its ability to examine global value chains.

=== Combination with life cycle analysis (LCA) ===
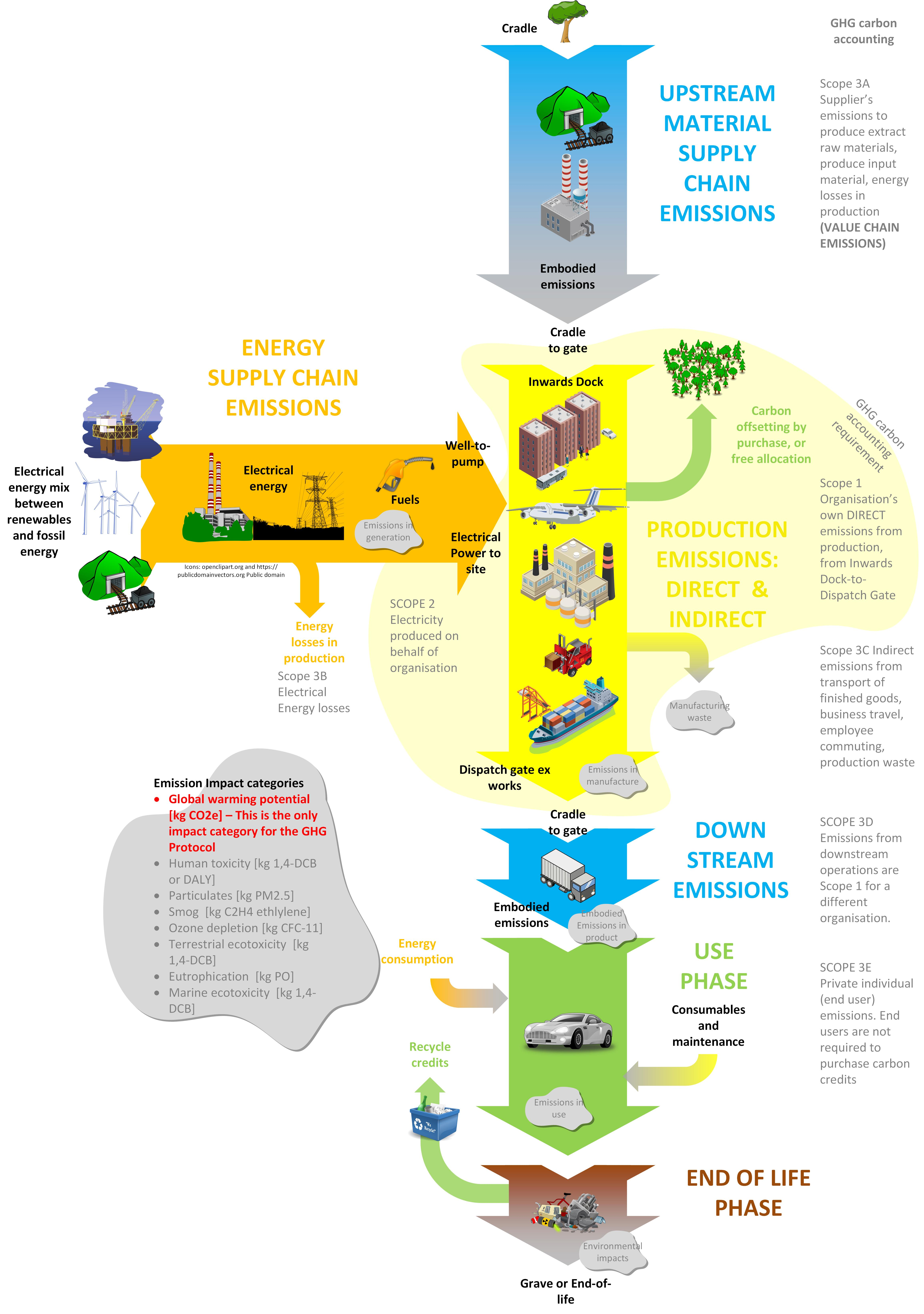
Life cycle analysis: The full life cycle includes a production chain (comprising supply chains, manufacture, and transport), the energy supply chain, the use phase, and the end of life (disposal, recycle) stage.

Life cycle assessment (LCA) is a methodology for assessing all environmental impacts associated with the life cycle of a commercial product, process, or service. It is not limited to the greenhouse gas emissions. It is also called life cycle analysis. It includes water pollution, air pollution, ecotoxicity and similar types of pollution. Some widely recognized procedures for LCA are included in the ISO 14000 series of environmental management standards. A standard called ISO 14040:2006 provides the framework for conducting an LCA study. ISO 14060 family of standards provides further sophisticated tools. Also the latest standard, ISO 14064:2018 has the right set of tools that will help reduce Carbon Emissions in Corporations. These are used to quantify, monitor, report and validate or verify GHG emissions and removals.

Greenhouse gas product life cycle assessments can also comply with specifications such as Publicly Available Specification (PAS) 2050 and the GHG Protocol Life Cycle Accounting and Reporting Standard.

An advantage of LCA is the high level of detail that can be obtained on-site or by liaising with suppliers. However, LCA has been hampered by the artificial construction of a boundary after which no further impacts of upstream suppliers are considered. This can introduce significant truncation errors. LCA has been combined with input-output analysis. This enables on-site detailed knowledge to be incorporated. IO connects to global economic databases to incorporate the entire supply chain.

== Problems ==
=== Shifting responsibility from corporations to individuals ===
Critics argue that the original aim of promoting the personal carbon footprint concept was to shift responsibility away from corporations and institutions and on to personal lifestyle choices. The fossil fuel company BP ran a large advertising campaign for the personal carbon footprint in 2004 which helped popularize this concept. This strategy, employed by many major fossil fuel companies, has been criticized for trying to shift the blame for negative consequences of those industries on to individual choices.

Geoffrey Supran and Naomi Oreskes of Harvard University argue that concepts such as carbon footprints "hamstring us, and they put blinders on us, to the systemic nature of the climate crisis and the importance of taking collective action to address the problem".

While the focus on individual behaviour has shaped public discourse, scientific assessments emphasize that this approach alone is insufficient. The IPCC notes that individual behavioural changes alone are insufficient to achieve deep emission reductions. In its Sixth Assessment Report (2023), the IPCC stated that "Demand-side measures and new ways of end-use service provision can reduce global GHG emissions in end-use sectors by 40–70% by 2050 compared to baseline scenarios" This highlights the need to combine lifestyle changes with systemic transitions—such as clean energy systems, electrification of transport and heating, and collective infrastructure solutions—to effectively address climate change. Reducing emissions through behaviour is important, but eliminating combustion altogether through systemic change is critical to long-term climate goals.

=== Relationship with other environmental impacts ===
A focus on carbon footprints can lead people to ignore or even exacerbate other related environmental issues of concern. These include biodiversity loss, ecotoxicity, and habitat destruction. It may not be easy to measure these other human impacts on the environment with a single indicator like the carbon footprint. Consumers may think that the carbon footprint is a proxy for environmental impact. In many cases this is not correct. There can be trade-offs between reducing carbon footprint and environmental protection goals. One example is the use of biofuel, a renewable energy source that can reduce the carbon footprint of the energy supply but can also pose ecological challenges during its production. This is because it is often produced in monocultures with ample use of fertilizers and pesticides. Another example is offshore wind parks, which could have unintended impacts on marine ecosystems.

The carbon footprint analysis solely focuses on greenhouse gas emissions, unlike a life-cycle assessment which is much broader and looks at all environmental impacts. Therefore, it is useful to stress in communication activities that the carbon footprint is just one in a family of indicators (e.g. ecological footprint, water footprint, land footprint, and material footprint), and should not be looked at in isolation. In fact, carbon footprint can be treated as one component of ecological footprint.

The "Sustainable Consumption and Production Hotspot Analysis Tool" (SCP-HAT) is a tool to place carbon footprint analysis into a wider perspective. It includes a number of socio-economic and environmental indicators. It offers calculations that are either consumption-based, following the carbon footprint approach, or production-based. The database of the SCP-HAT tool is underpinned by input–output analysis. This means it includes Scope 3 emissions. The IO methodology is also governed by UN standards. It is based on input-output tables of countries' national accounts and international trade data such as UN Comtrade, and therefore it is comparable worldwide.

=== Differing boundaries for calculations ===
The term carbon footprint has been applied to limited calculations that do not include Scope 3 emissions or the entire supply chain. This can lead to claims of misleading customers with regards to the real carbon footprints of companies or products.

== Reported values ==
=== Greenhouse gas emissions overview ===
Greenhouse gas emissions per person in the highest-emitting countries (as of 2023). Areas of rectangles represent total emissions for each country.

Greenhouse gas emissions (GHG emissions) from human activities intensify the greenhouse effect which contributes to climate change. Carbon dioxide (CO_{2}) from burning fossil fuels (such as coal, oil, and natural gas) is the main cause of climate change. The largest annual emissions are from China followed by the United States, which has higher emissions per capita. Emissions from human activities have increased atmospheric carbon dioxide by about 50% over pre-industrial levels. The growing levels of emissions have varied, but have been consistent among all greenhouse gases. Over 60 billion tons were emitted in 2025, higher than any year before. Total cumulative emissions from 1870 to 2022 were 703 GtC (2575 GtCO_{2}), of which 484±20 GtC (1773±73 GtCO_{2}) from fossil fuels and industry, and 219±60 GtC (802±220 GtCO_{2}) from land use change. Land-use change, such as deforestation, caused about 31% of cumulative emissions over 1870–2022, coal 32%, oil 24%, and gas 10%.

Carbon dioxide is the main greenhouse gas resulting from human activities. It accounts for more than half of warming. Methane (CH_{4}) emissions have almost the same short-term impact. Nitrous oxide (N_{2}O) and fluorinated gases (F-gases) play a lesser role in comparison. Emissions of carbon dioxide, methane and nitrous oxide in 2023 were all higher than ever before.

=== By products ===
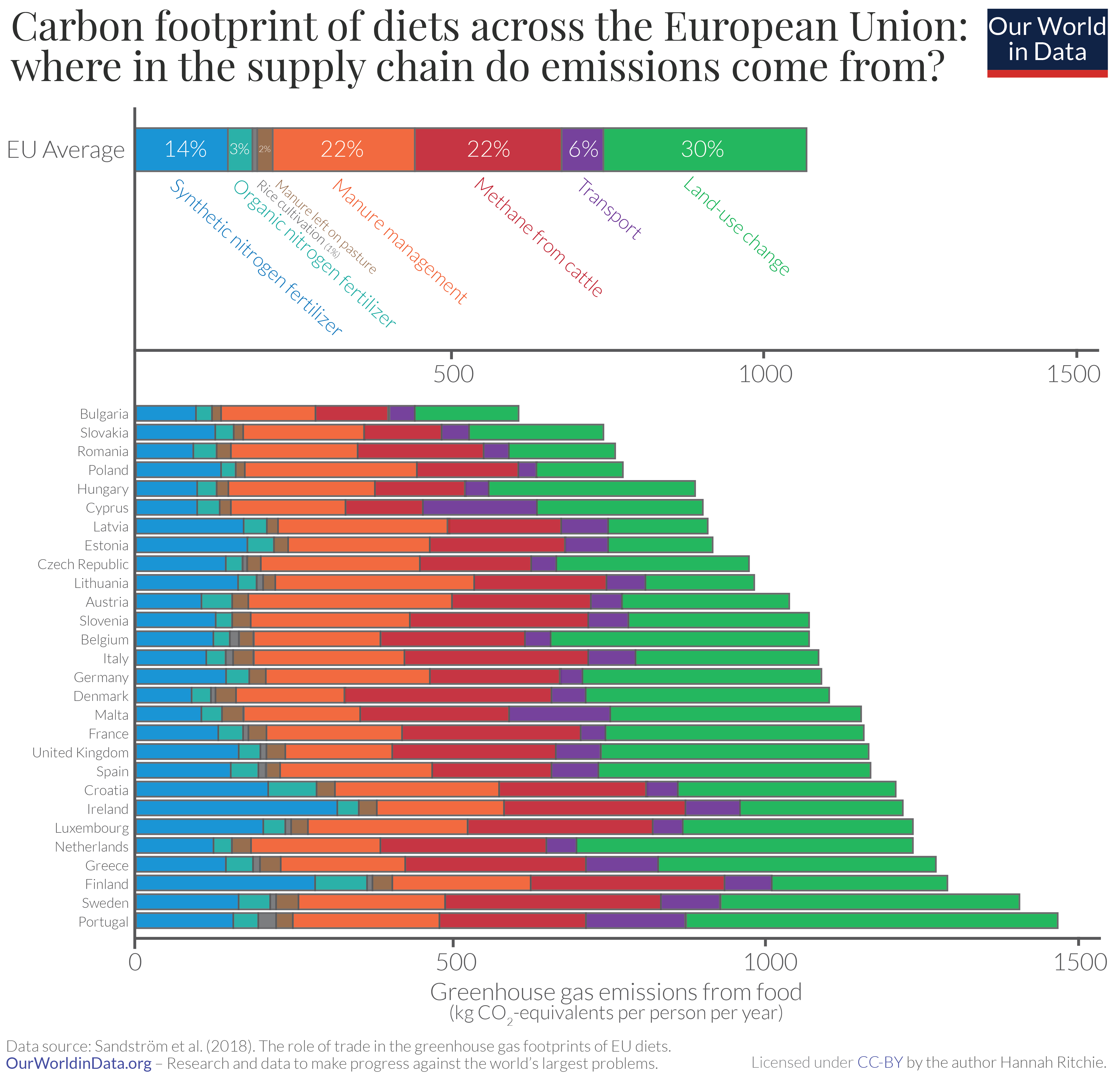
Carbon footprint of EU diets by supply chain

The Carbon Trust has worked with UK manufacturers to produce "thousands of carbon footprint assessments". As of 2014 the Carbon Trust state they have measured 28,000 certifiable product carbon footprints. This NGO has also developed a labelling scheme which "supports informed consumer choices and business procurement decisions".

==== Food ====
Plant-based foods tend to have a lower carbon footprint than meat and dairy. In many cases a much smaller footprint. This holds true when comparing the footprint of foods in terms of their weight, protein content or calories. The protein output of peas and beef provides an example. Producing 100 grams of protein from peas emits just 0.4 kilograms of carbon dioxide equivalents (CO_{2}eq). To get the same amount of protein from beef, emissions would be nearly 90 times higher, at 35 kgCO_{2}eq. Only a small fraction of the carbon footprint of food comes from transport and packaging. Most of it comes from processes on the farm, or from land use change. This means the choice of what to eat has a larger potential to reduce carbon footprint than how far the food has traveled, or how much packaging it is wrapped in.

=== By sector ===
The IPCC Sixth Assessment Report found that global GHG emissions have continued to rise across all sectors. Global consumption was the main cause. The most rapid growth was in transport and industry. A key driver of global carbon emissions is affluence. The IPCC noted that the wealthiest 10% in the world contribute between about one third to one half (36%–45%) of global GHG emissions. Researchers have previously found that affluence is the key driver of carbon emissions. It has a bigger impact than population growth. And it counters the effects of technological developments. Continued economic growth mirrors the increasing trend in material extraction and GHG emissions. "Industrial emissions have been growing faster since 2000 than emissions in any other sector, driven by increased basic materials extraction and production," the IPCC said.

==== Transport ====
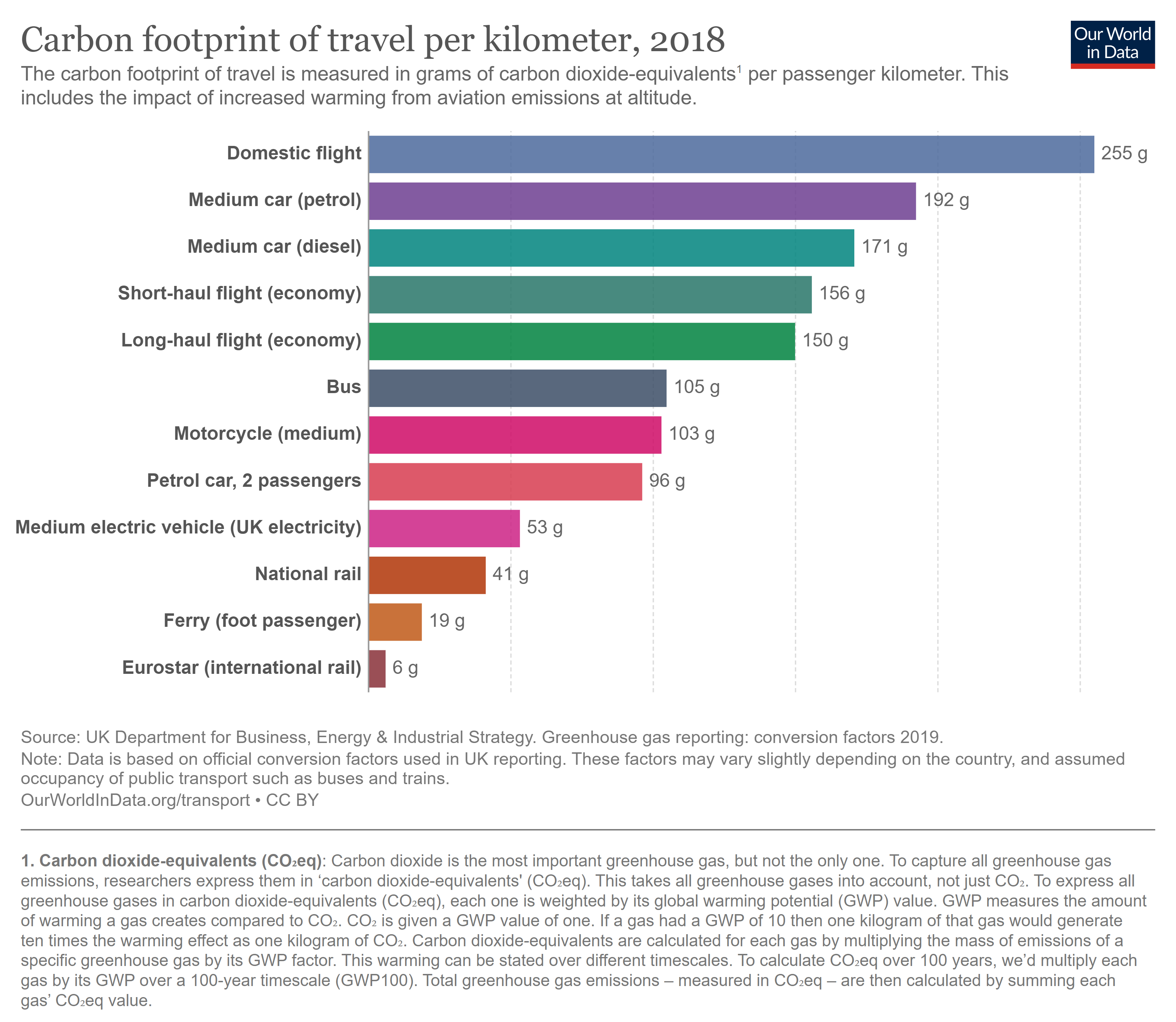
Comparison to show which form of transport has the smallest carbon footprint

There can be wide variations in emissions for transport of people. This is due to various factors. They include the length of the trip, the source of electricity in the local grid and the occupancy of public transport. In the case of driving the type of vehicle and number of passengers are factors. Over short to medium distances, walking or cycling are nearly always the lowest carbon way to travel. The carbon footprint of cycling one kilometer is usually in the range of 16 to 50 grams CO_{2}eq per km. For moderate or long distances, trains nearly always have a lower carbon footprint than other options.

=== By organization ===
==== Carbon accounting ====
Carbon accounting, also called greenhouse gas accounting or GHG accounting, is a framework of methods to measure and track how much greenhouse gas (GHG) an organization emits. It can also be used to track projects or actions to reduce emissions in sectors such as forestry or renewable energy. Corporations, cities and other groups use these techniques to help limit climate change. Organizations will often set an emissions baseline, create targets for reducing emissions, and track progress towards them. The accounting methods enable them to do this in a more consistent and transparent manner.

The main reasons for GHG accounting are to address social responsibility concerns or meet legal requirements. Public rankings of companies, financial due diligence and potential cost savings are other reasons. GHG accounting methods help investors better understand the climate risks of companies they invest in. They also help with net zero emission goals of corporations or communities. Many governments around the world require various forms of reporting. There is some evidence that programs that require GHG accounting help to lower emissions. Markets for buying and selling carbon credits depend on accurate measurement of emissions and emission reductions. These techniques can help to understand the impacts of specific products and services. They do this by quantifying their GHG emissions throughout their lifecycle (carbon footprint).

=== By country ===
Consumption-based CO₂ emissions per capita, 2017

CO_{2} emissions of countries are typically measured on the basis of production. This accounting method is sometimes referred to as territorial emissions. Countries use it when they report their emissions, and set domestic and international targets such as Nationally Determined Contributions. Consumption-based emissions on the other hand are adjusted for trade. To calculate consumption-based emissions analysts have to track which goods are traded across the world. Whenever a product is imported, all CO_{2} emissions that were emitted in the production of that product are included. Consumption-based emissions reflect the lifestyle choices of a country's citizens.

According to the World Bank, the global average carbon footprint in 2014 was about 5 tonnes of CO_{2} per person, measured on a production basis. The EU average for 2007 was about 13.8 tonnes CO_{2}e per person. For the USA, Luxembourg and Australia it was over 25 tonnes CO_{2}e per person. In 2017, the average for the USA was about 20 metric tonnes CO_{2}e per person. This is one of the highest per capita figures in the world.

The footprints per capita of countries in Africa and India were well below average. Assuming a global population of around 9–10 billion by 2050, a carbon footprint of about 2–2.5 tonnes CO_{2}e per capita is needed to stay within a 2 °C target. These carbon footprint calculations are based on a consumption-based approach using a Multi-Regional Input-Output (MRIO) database. This database accounts for all greenhouse gas (GHG) emissions in the global supply chain and allocates them to the final consumer of the purchased commodities.

== Reducing the carbon footprint ==
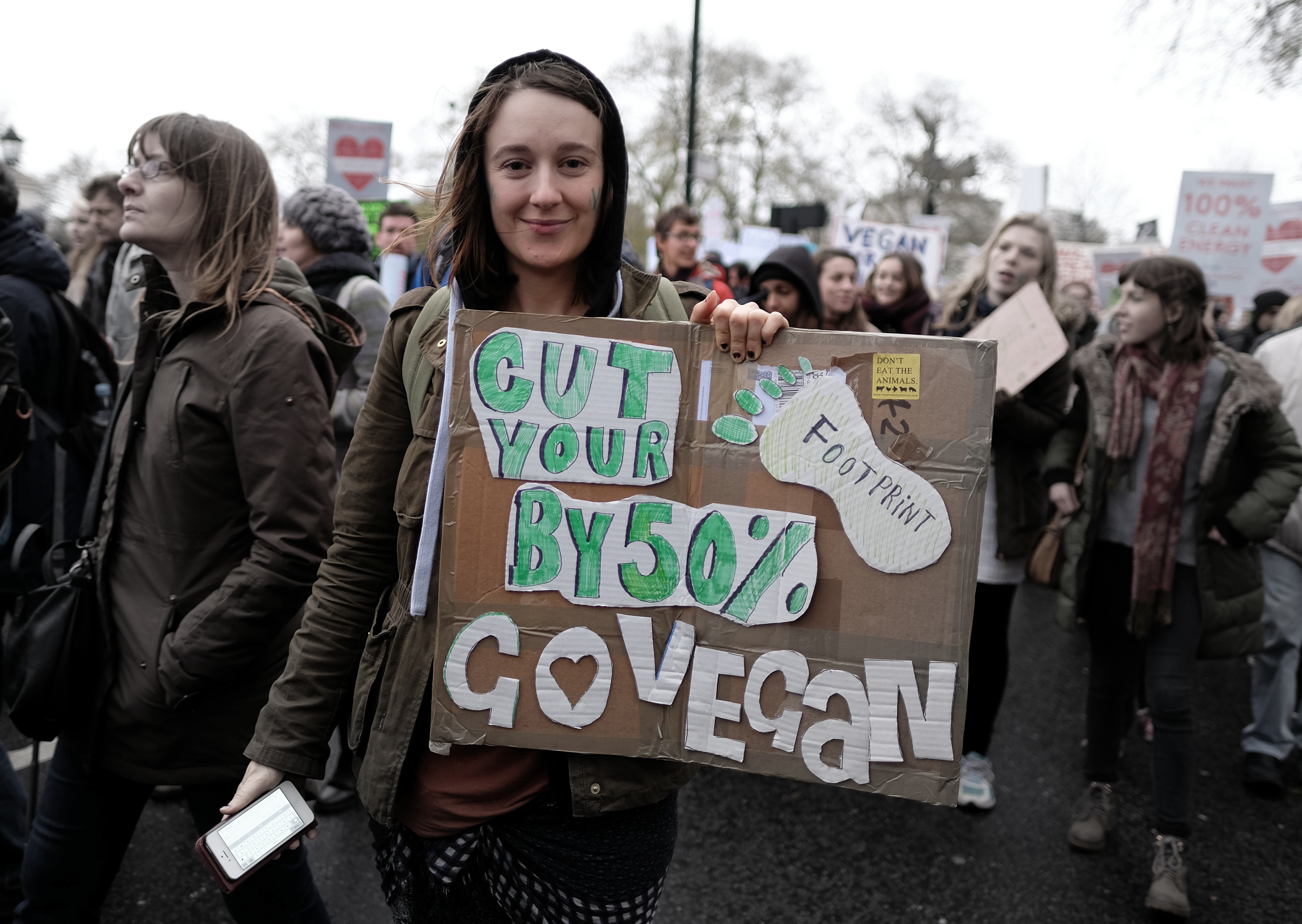
Sign at demonstration: "Go vegan and cut your climate footprint by 50%"

=== Climate change mitigation ===
Efforts to reduce the carbon footprint of products, services, and organizations help limit climate change. Such activities are called climate change mitigation.

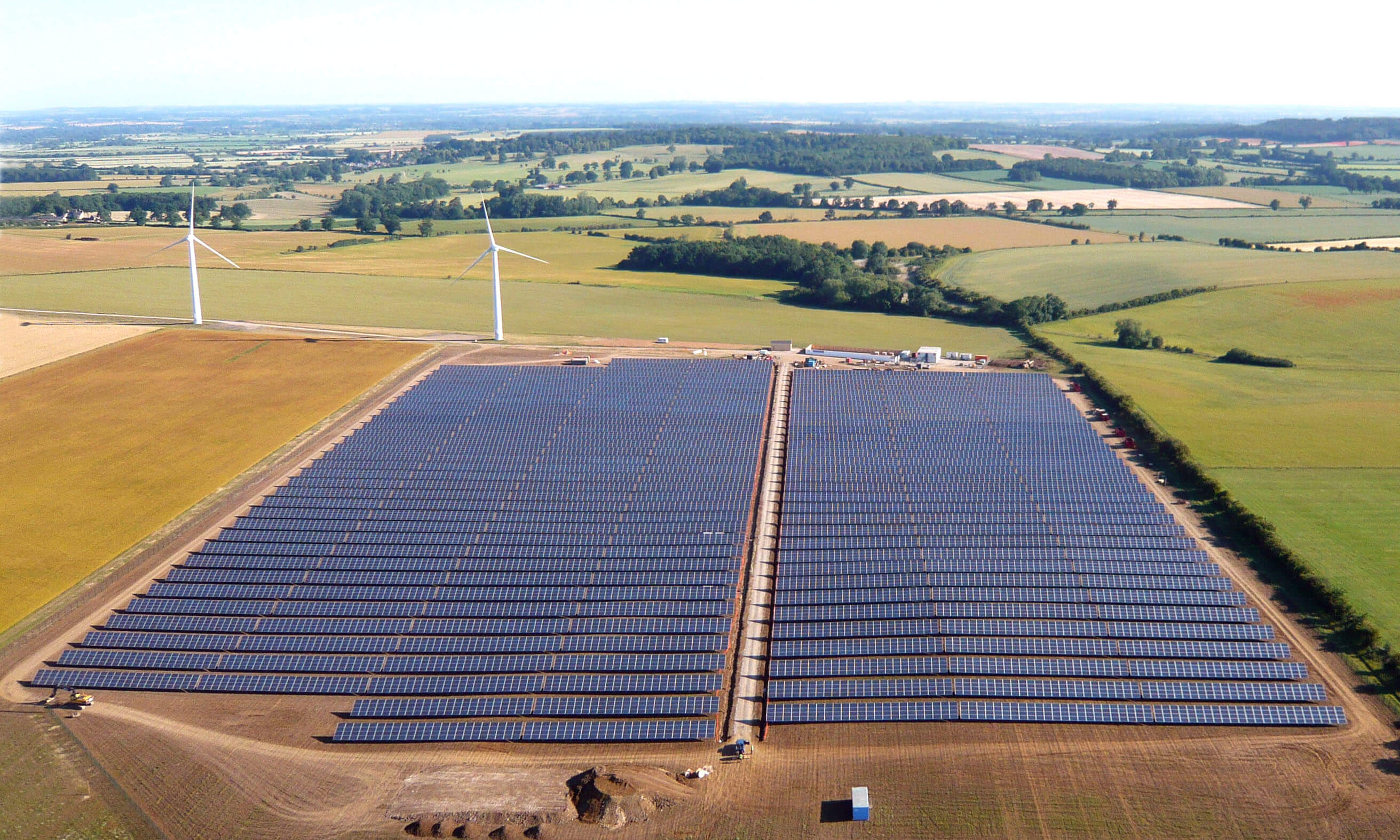
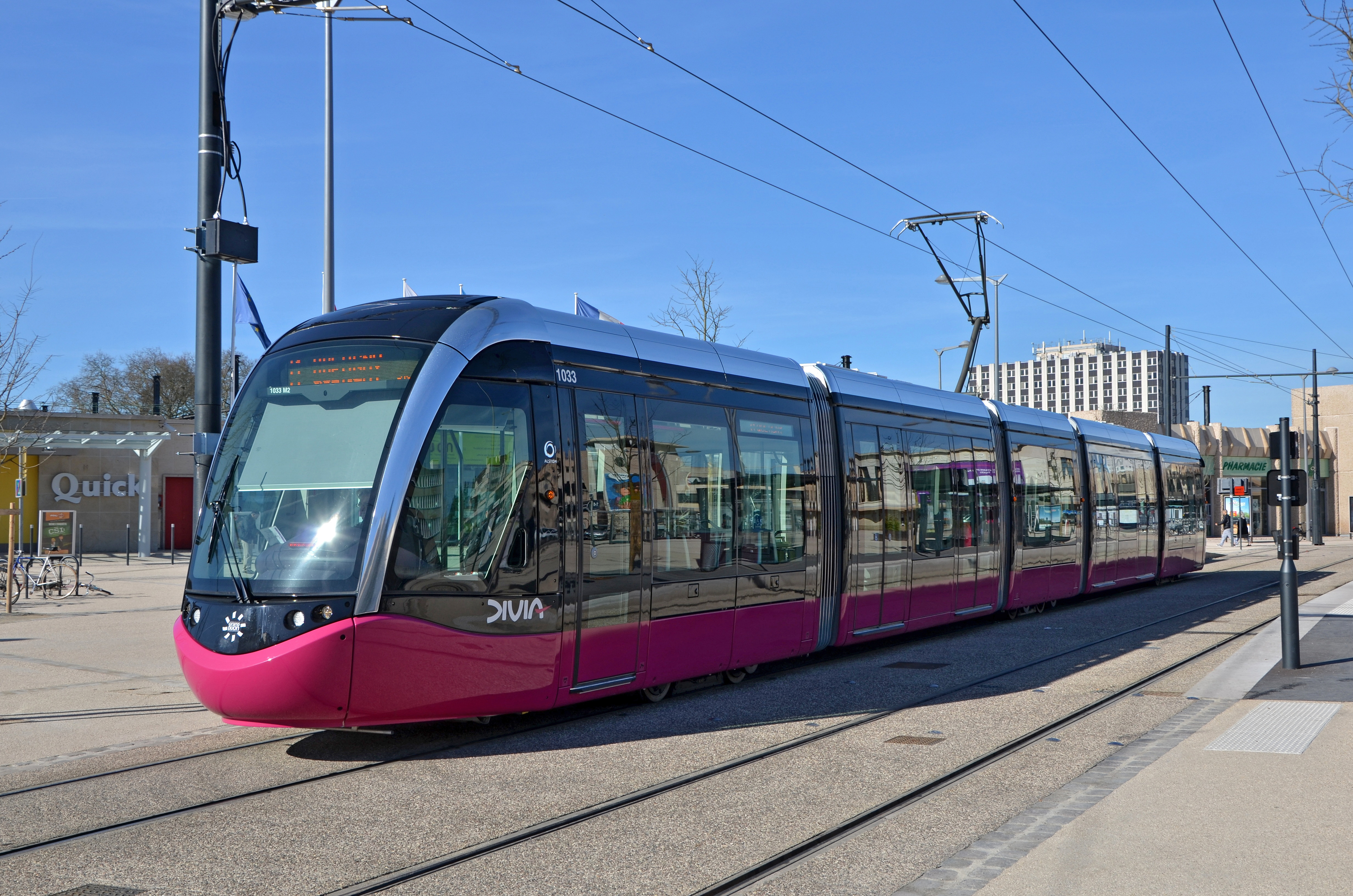
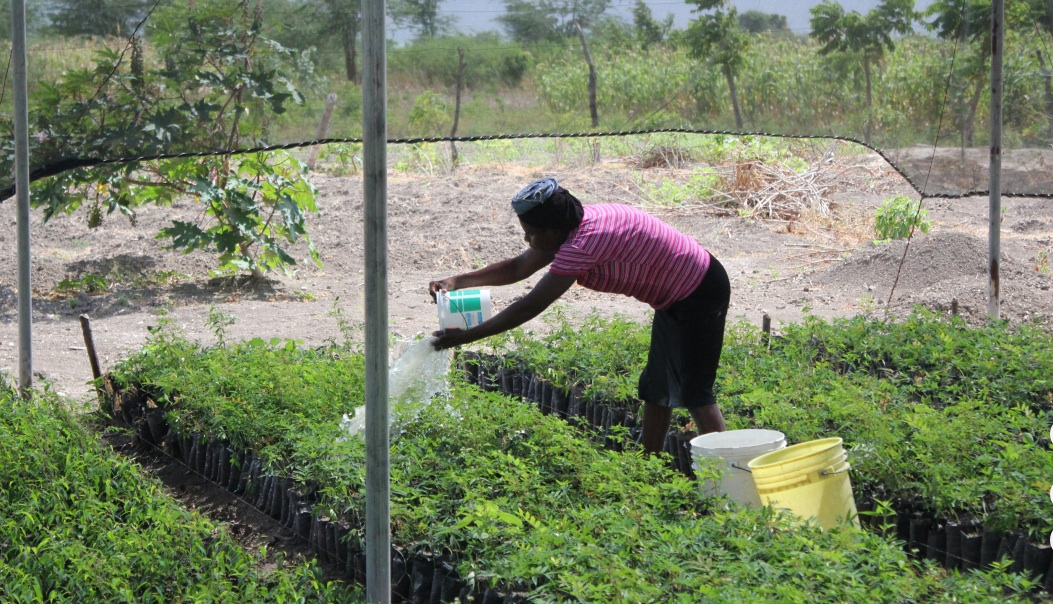
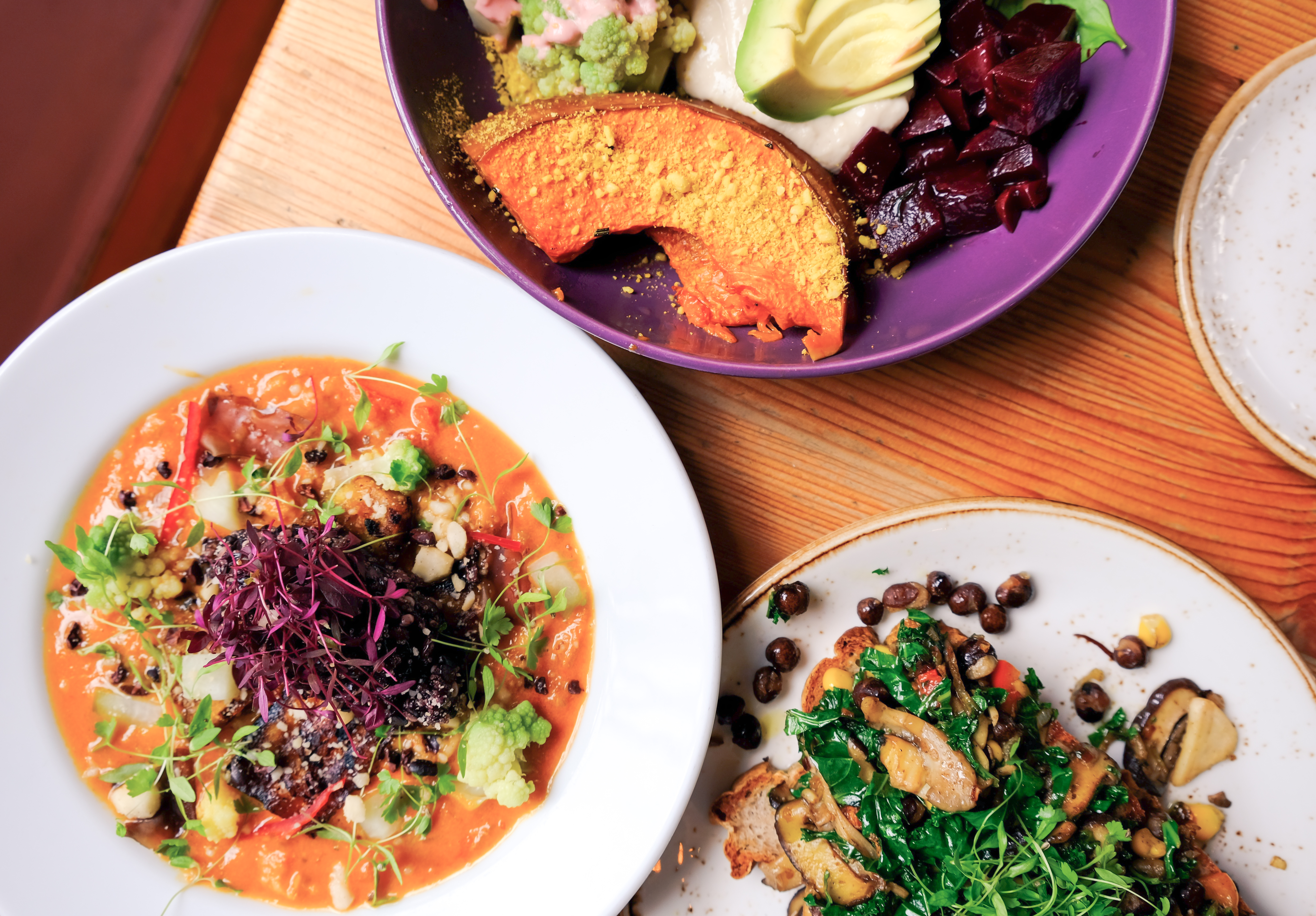
Various aspects of climate change mitigation: Renewable energy (solar and wind power) in England, electrified public transport in France, a reforestation project in Haiti to remove carbon dioxide from the atmosphere, and an example of a plant-based meal

Climate change mitigation, also called decarbonisation, is an action to limit the greenhouse gases in the atmosphere that cause climate change. Climate change mitigation actions include conserving energy and replacing fossil fuels with clean energy sources. Secondary mitigation strategies include changes to land use and removing carbon dioxide (CO_{2}) from the atmosphere. 2022 assessments emphasize that global greenhouse gas emissions must peak before 2025 and decline by about 43% by 2030 to limit warming to 1.5 °C, requiring rapid transitions in energy, transport, and land-use systems.

=== Reducing industry's carbon footprint ===
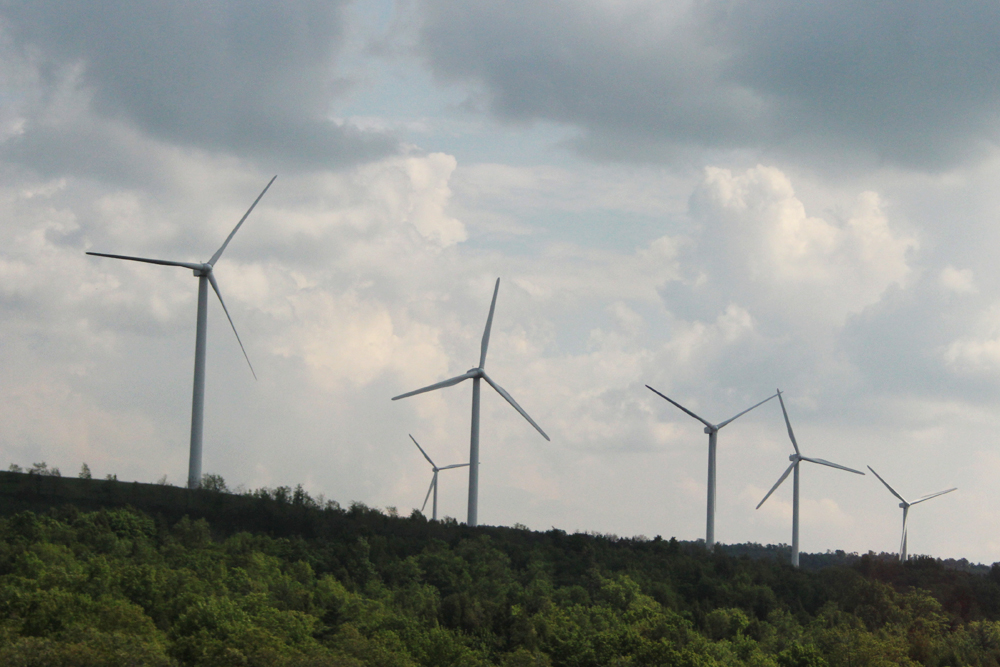
Wind farms provide energy with a fairly low carbon footprint compared to fossil fuels.

Carbon offsetting can reduce a company's overall carbon footprint by providing it with a carbon credit. This compensates the company for carbon dioxide emissions by recognizing an equivalent reduction of carbon dioxide in the atmosphere. Reforestation, or restocking existing forests that have previously been depleted, is an example of carbon offsetting.

A carbon footprint study can identify specific and critical areas for improvement. It uses input-output analysis and scrutinizes the entire supply chain. Such an analysis could be used to eliminate the supply chains with the highest greenhouse gas emissions.

== History ==
The term carbon footprint was first used in a BBC vegetarian food magazine in 1999, though the broader concept of ecological footprint, which encompasses the carbon footprint, had been used since at least 1992, as also chronicled by journalist William Safire in the New York Times.

In 2005, fossil fuel company BP hired the large advertising campaign Ogilvy to popularize the idea of a carbon footprint for individuals. The campaign instructed people to calculate their personal footprints and provided ways for people to "go on a low-carbon diet".

The carbon footprint is derived from the ecological footprint, which encompasses carbon emissions. The carbon footprint follows the logic of ecological footprint accounting, which tracks the resource use embodied in consumption, whether it is a product, an individual, a city, or a country. While in the ecological footprint, carbon emissions are translated into areas needed to absorb the carbon emissions, the carbon footprint on its own is expressed in the weight of carbon emissions per time unit. William Rees wrote the first academic publication about ecological footprints in 1992. Other related concepts from the 1990s are the "ecological backpack" and material input per unit of service (MIPS).

== Trends and similar concepts ==
The International Sustainability Standards Board (ISSB) aims to bring global, rigorous oversight to carbon footprint reporting. It was formed out of the International Financial Reporting Standards. It will require companies to report on their Scope 3 emissions. The ISSB has taken on board criticisms of other initiatives in its aims for universality. It consolidates the Carbon Disclosure Standards Board, the Sustainability Accounting Standards Board and the Value Reporting Foundation. It complements the Global Reporting Initiative. It is influenced by the Task Force on Climate-Related Financial Disclosures. As of early 2023, Great Britain and Nigeria were preparing to adopt these standards.

The concept of total equivalent warming impact (TEWI) is the most used index for carbon dioxide equivalent (CO_{2}) emissions calculation in air conditioning and refrigeration sectors by including both the direct and indirect contributions since it evaluates the emissions caused by the operating lifetime of systems. The Expanded Total Equivalent Warming Impact method has been used for an accurate evaluation of refrigerators emissions.

== See also ==
- Carbon emission
- Carbon intensity
- Carbon neutrality
- Ecological footprint
- Embedded emissions
- Food miles
- Greenhouse gas inventory
- Individual action on climate change
- Life-cycle greenhouse gas emissions of energy sources
- Zero-carbon city
