= Australian Research Institute for Environment and Sustainability =

Australian research centre

Australian Research Institute for Environment and Sustainability (ARIES) is an Australian not-for-profit research centre at Macquarie University in Macquarie Park, New South Wales that was commissioned in 2003 by the Australian Government to conduct research that supports change for sustainable lifestyles. It was previously called Australian Research Institute in Education for Sustainability and the first director of the program was Daniella Tilbury.

== See also ==
- Infrastructure Sustainability Council of Australia
