= Infrastructure Sustainability Council of Australia =

Infrastructure Sustainability Council
- Formation: 2008
- Type: Non-profit
- Headquarters: Sydney, New South Wales
- Chief Executive Officer: Ainsley Simpson
- Website: www.iscouncil.org//

The Infrastructure Sustainability Council is a company limited by guarantee which was formed by a group of industry professionals from engineering, environmental, planning, legal, financial and construction backgrounds working in both private and public organisations related to infrastructure. It was founded as the Australian Green Infrastructure Council on 28 February 2008. The current name became effective on 4 April 2013.

== See also ==
- Australian Research Institute for Environment and Sustainability
- CEEQUAL
