= Global hectare =

Measurement unit

The Global Hectare (GHa) is a measurement unit for the ecological footprint of people or activities and the biocapacity of the Earth or its regions. One global hectare is the world's annual amount of biological production for human use and human waste assimilation, per hectare of biologically productive land and fisheries.

It measures the production and consumption of different products. It starts with the total biological production and waste assimilation in the world, including crops, forests (both wood production and CO_{2} absorption), grazing, and fishing. The total of these kinds of production, weighted by the richness of the land they use, is divided by the number of hectares used. Biologically productive areas include cropland, forest, and fishing grounds, and do not include deserts, glaciers, and the open ocean.

"Global Hectares per person" refers to the amount of production and waste assimilation per person on the planet. In 2012, there were approximately 12.2 billion global hectares of production and waste assimilation, averaging 1.7 GHa per person. Consumption totaled 20.1 billion global hectares or 2.8 global hectares per person, meaning about 65% more was consumed than produced. This is possible because there are natural reserves all around the globe that function as backup food, material, and energy supplies, although only for a relatively short period of time. Due to overconsumption, these reserves are being depleted at an ever-increasing rate (see Earth Overshoot Day).

The term "global hectare" was introduced in the early 2000s, based on a similar concept from the 1970s named "ghost acreage". Opponents and defenders of the concept have discussed its strengths and weaknesses.

== Applications ==
The Global Hectare is a useful measure of biocapacity as it can convert things like human dietary requirements into common units, which can show how many people a certain region on earth can sustain, assuming current technologies and agricultural methods. It can be used as a way of determining the relative carrying capacity of the Earth.

Different hectares of land can provide different amounts of global hectares. For example, a hectare of lush area with high rainfall would scale higher in global hectares than would a hectare of desert.

It can also be used to show that consuming different foods may increase the Earth's ability to support larger populations. To illustrate, producing meat generally requires more land and energy than producing vegetables requires; sustaining a meat-based diet would require a less populated planet.

== Hectare equivalents ==
On average, a global hectare can be produced in the area of a standard hectare. A hectare (/ˈhɛktɛər/; symbol ha) is a unit of area equal to 10,000 square metres (107,639 sq ft) (a square 100 metres on each side or 328 feet on each side), 2.471 acres, 0.01 square kilometers, 0.00386102 square miles, or one square hectometre (100 metres squared).

== See also ==
- Balance of nature
- Ecological footprint
- Energy returned on energy invested
- Land (economics)
- Natural resource economics
- Social metabolism
- Water use
- Earth Overshoot Day
