= Water footprint =

Extent of water use in relation to consumption by people

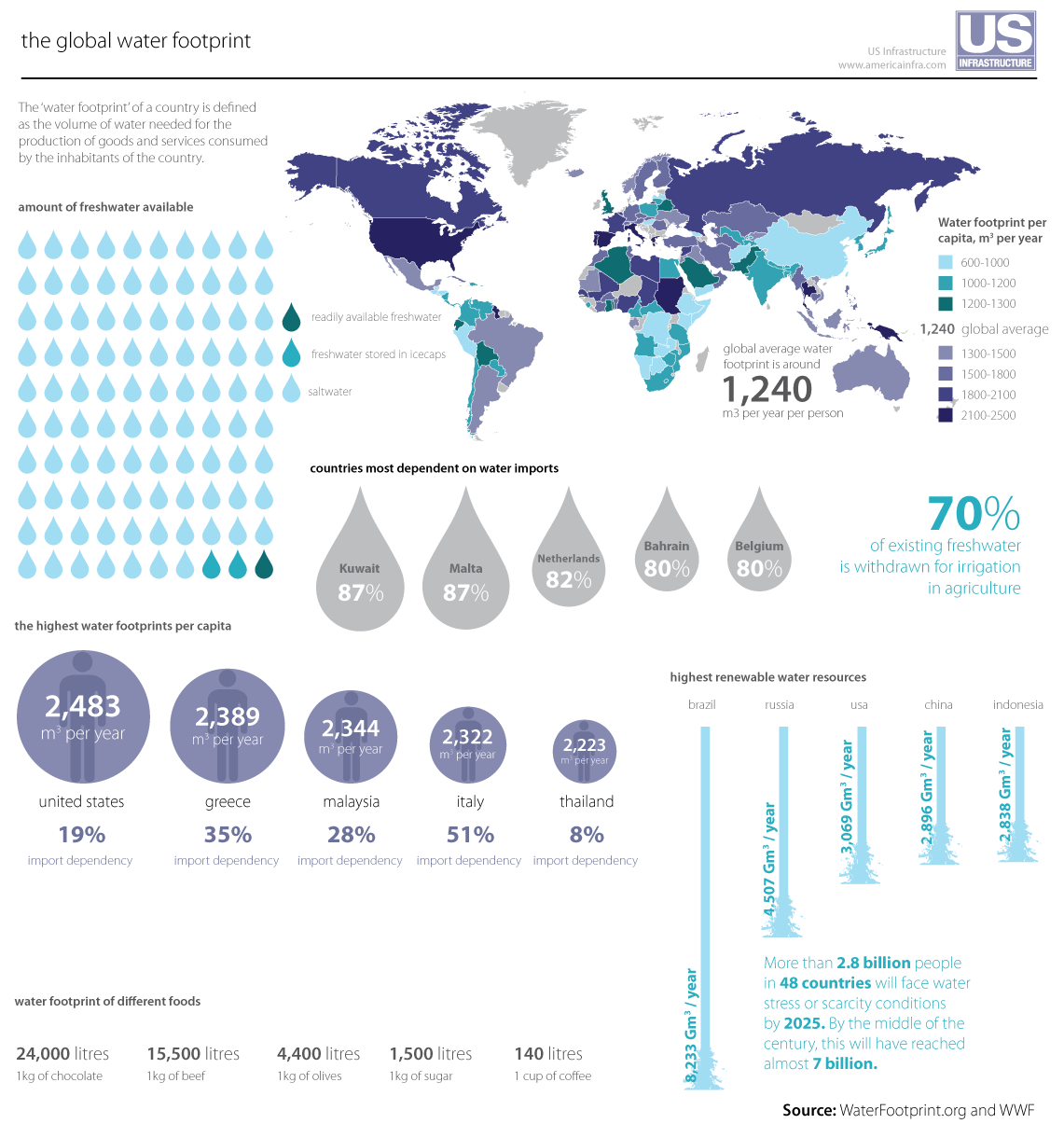
Infographic of water footprints around the world

A water footprint shows the extent of water use in relation to consumption by people. The water footprint of an individual, community, or business is defined as the total volume of fresh water used to produce the goods and services consumed by the individual or community or produced by the business. Water use is measured in water volume consumed (evaporated) and/or polluted per unit of time. A water footprint can be calculated for any well-defined group of consumers (e.g., an individual, family, village, city, province, state, or nation) or producers (e.g., a public organization, private enterprise, or economic sector), for a single process (such as growing rice) or for any product or service.

Traditionally, water use has been approached from the production side, by quantifying the following three columns of water use: water withdrawals in the agricultural, industrial, and domestic sector. While this does provide valuable data, it is a limited way of looking at water use in a globalised world, in which products are not always consumed in their country of origin. International trade of agricultural and industrial products in effect creates a global flow of virtual water, or embodied water (akin to the concept of embodied energy).

In 2002, the water footprint concept was introduced in order to have a consumption-based indicator of water use, that could provide useful information in addition to the traditional production-sector-based indicators of water use. It is analogous to the ecological footprint concept introduced in the 1990s. The water footprint is a geographically explicit indicator, not only showing volumes of water use and pollution, but also the locations. The global issue of water footprinting underscores the importance of fair and sustainable resource management. Due to increasing water shortages, climate change, and environmental concerns, transitioning towards a fair impact of water use is critical. The water footprint concept offers detailed insights for adequate and equitable water resource management. It advocates for a balanced and sustainable water-use approach, aiming to tackle global challenges. This approach is essential for responsible and equitable water resource utilization globally. Thus, it gives a grasp on how economic choices and processes influence the availability of adequate water resources and other ecological realities across the globe (and vice versa).

== Definition and measures ==
There are many different aspects to water footprint and therefore different definitions and measures to describe them. Blue water footprint refers to groundwater or surface water usage, green water footprint refers to rainwater, and grey water footprint refers to the amount of water needed to dilute pollutants.

Water footprint may be quantified physically simply as a volume (in units of litres or cubic metres). Other metrics, often termed water intensity (water consumption intensity or water footprint intensity), are derived as the quotient of volume and a unit of production, for example: volume per energy (in cubic metres per watt-hour) in the energy generation sector, volume per area (in cubic metres per square kilometre) in the agriculture sector, volume per mass (in cubic metres per tonne) in the manufacturing sector, etc.

=== Blue water footprint ===
A blue water footprint refers to the volume of water that has been sourced from surface or groundwater resources (lakes, rivers, wetlands and aquifers) and has either evaporated (for example while irrigating crops), or been incorporated into a product or taken from one body of water and returned to another, or returned at a different time. Irrigated agriculture, industry and domestic water use can each have a blue water footprint.

=== Green water footprint ===
A green water footprint refers to the amount of water from precipitation that, after having been stored in the root zone of the soil (green water), is either lost by evapotranspiration or incorporated by plants. It is particularly relevant for agricultural, horticultural and forestry products.

=== Grey water footprint ===
A grey water footprint refers to the volume of water that is required to dilute pollutants (industrial discharges, seepage from tailing ponds at mining operations, untreated municipal wastewater, or nonpoint source pollution such as agricultural runoff or urban runoff) to such an extent that the quality of the water meets agreed water quality standards. It is calculated as:

$$\frac{L}{c_\text{max} - c_\text{nat}}$$

where L is the pollutant load (as mass flux), c_{max} the maximum allowable concentration and c_{nat} the natural concentration of the pollutant in the receiving water body (both expressed in mass/volume).

=== Calculation for different factors ===
The water footprint of a process is expressed as volumetric flow rate of water. That of a product is the whole footprint (sum) of processes in its complete supply chain divided by the number of product units. For consumers, businesses and geographic area, water footprint is indicated as volume of water per time, in particular:

- That of a consumer is the sum of footprint of all consumed products.
- That of a community or a nation is the sum for all of its members resp. inhabitants.
- That of a business is the footprint of all produced goods.
- That of a geographically delineated area is the footprint of all processes undertaken in this area. The virtual change in water of an area is the net import of virtual water V_{i, net}, defined as the difference of the gross import V_{i} of virtual water from its gross export V_{e}. The water footprint of national consumption WF_{area,nat} results from this as the sum of the water footprint of national area and its virtual change in water.

== History ==
The concept of a water footprint was coined in 2002, by Arjen Hoekstra, Professor in water management at the University of Twente, Netherlands, and co-founder and scientific director of the Water Footprint Network, whilst working at the UNESCO-IHE Institute for Water Education, as a metric to measure the amount of water consumed and polluted to produce goods and services along their full supply chain. Water footprint is one of a family of ecological footprint indicators, which also includes carbon footprint and land footprint. The water footprint concept is further related to the idea of virtual water trade introduced in the early 1990s by Professor John Allan (2008 Stockholm Water Prize Laureate). The most elaborate publications on how to estimate water footprints are a 2004 report on the Water footprint of nations from UNESCO-IHE, the 2008 book Globalization of Water, and the 2011 manual The water footprint assessment manual: Setting the global standard. Cooperation between global leading institutions in the field has led to the establishment of the Water Footprint Network in 2008.

=== Water Footprint Network (WFN) ===
The Water Footprint Network is an international learning community (a non-profit foundation under Dutch law) which serves as a platform for sharing knowledge, tools and innovations among governments, businesses and communities concerned about growing water scarcity and increasing water pollution levels, and their impacts on people and nature. The network consists of around 100 partners from all sectors – producers, investors, suppliers and regulators – as well as non-governmental organisations and academics. It describes its mission as follows:

To provide science-based, practical solutions and strategic insights that empower companies, governments, individuals and small-scale producers to transform the way we use and share fresh water within earth's limits.

=== International standard ===
In February 2011, the Water Footprint Network, in a global collaborative effort of environmental organizations, companies, research institutions and the UN, launched the Global Water Footprint Standard. In July 2014, the International Organization for Standardization issued ISO 14046:2014, Environmental management—Water footprint—Principles, requirements and guidelines, to provide practical guidance to practitioners from various backgrounds, such as large companies, public authorities, non-governmental organizations, academic and research groups as well as small and medium enterprises, for carrying out a water footprint assessment. The ISO standard is based on life-cycle assessment (LCA) principles and can be applied for different sorts of assessment of products and companies.

=== Life-cycle assessment of water use ===
Life-cycle assessment (LCA) is a systematic, phased approach to assessing the environmental aspects and potential impacts that are associated with a product, process or service. "Life cycle" refers to the major activities connected with the product's life-span, from its manufacture, use, and maintenance, to its final disposal, and also including the acquisition of raw material required to manufacture the product. Thus a method for assessing the environmental impacts of freshwater consumption was developed. It specifically looks at the damage to three areas of protection: human health, ecosystem quality, and resources. The consideration of water consumption is crucial where water-intensive products (for example agricultural goods) are concerned that need to therefore undergo a life-cycle assessment. In addition, regional assessments are equally as necessary as the impact of water use depends on its location. In short, LCA is important as it identifies the impact of water use in certain products, consumers, companies, nations, etc. which can help reduce the amount of water used.

=== Water positive ===
The Water Positive initiative can be defined as the concept where an entity, such as a company, community, or individual, goes beyond simply conserving water and actively contributes to the sustainable management and restoration of water resources. A commercial or residential development is considered water positive when it generates more water than it consumes. This involves implementing practices and technologies that reduce water consumption, improve water quality, and enhance water availability. The goal of being water positive is to leave a positive impact on water ecosystem and ensure that more water is conserved and restored than is used or depleted.

== Water availability ==
Total renewable water resources per capita in 2020

Globally, about 4 percent of precipitation falling on land each year (about 117,000 km^{3} (28,000 cu mi)), is used by rain-fed agriculture and about half is subject to evaporation and transpiration in forests and other natural or quasi-natural landscapes. The remainder, which goes to groundwater replenishment and surface runoff, is sometimes called "total actual renewable freshwater resources". Its magnitude was in 2012 estimated at 52,579 km^{3} (12,614 cu mi)/year. It represents water that can be used either in-stream or after withdrawal from surface and groundwater sources. Of this remainder, about 3,918 km^{3} (940 cu mi) were withdrawn in 2007, of which 2,722 km^{3} (653 cu mi), or 69 percent, were used by agriculture, and 734 km^{3} (176 cu mi), or 19 percent, by other industry. Most agricultural use of withdrawn water is for irrigation, which uses about 5.1 percent of total actual renewable freshwater resources. World water use has been growing rapidly in the last hundred years.

== By sector ==
=== Agricultural sector ===
The water footprint of a product is the total volume of freshwater used to produce the product, summed over the various steps of the production chain. The water footprint of a product refers not only to the total volume of water used; it also refers to where and when the water is used. The Water Footprint Network maintains a global database on the water footprint of products: WaterStat. Nearly over 70% of the water supply worldwide is used in the agricultural sector.

The water footprints involved in various diets vary greatly, and much of the variation tends to be associated with levels of meat consumption. The following table gives examples of estimated global average water footprints of popular agricultural products.

Product	Global average water footprint, L/kg
almonds, shelled	16,194
apple	822
avocado	283
banana	790
beef	15,415
bread, wheat	1,608
butter	5,553
cabbage	237
cheese	3,178
chicken	4,325
chocolate	17,196
cotton lint	9,114
cucumber	353
dates	2,277
eggs	3,300
groundnuts, shell	2,782
leather (bovine)	17,093
e	238
maize	1,222
mango/guava	1,800
milk	1,021
olive oil	14,430
orange	560
pasta (dry)	1,849
peach/nectarine	910
pork	5,988
potato	287
pumpkin	353
rice	2,497
tomatoes, fresh	214
tomatoes, dried	4,275
vanilla beans	126,505

=== Industrial sector ===
The water footprint of a business, the 'corporate water footprint', is defined as the total volume of freshwater that is used directly or indirectly to run and support a business. It is the total volume of water use to be associated with the use of the business outputs. The water footprint of a business consists of water used for producing/manufacturing or for supporting activities and the indirect water use in the producer's supply chain.

The Carbon Trust argue that a more robust approach is for businesses to go beyond simple volumetric measurement to assess the full range of water impact from all sites. Its work with leading global pharmaceutical company GlaxoSmithKline (GSK) analysed four key categories: water availability, water quality, health impacts, and licence to operate (including reputational and regulatory risks) in order to enable GSK to quantitatively measure, and credibly reduce, its year-on-year water impact.

The Coca-Cola Company operates over a thousand manufacturing plants in about 200 countries. Making its drink uses a lot of water. Critics say its water footprint has been large. Coca-Cola has started to look at its water sustainability. It has now set out goals to reduce its water footprint such as treating the water it uses so it goes back into the environment in a clean state. Another goal is to find sustainable sources for the raw materials it uses in its drinks, such as sugarcane, oranges, and maize. By making its water footprint better, the company can reduce costs, improve the environment, and benefit the communities in which it operates.

=== Technology companies ===
Similar to the industry sector, many global technology companies have been forced to address their large water footprints, especially with the development of AI technology which further increases their data centres water consumption.

Meta announced in 2021 their goal to be water positive by 2030, offsetting all their water use through water restoration projects. Furthermore, they aim to offset 200% of their water footprint in high-water stress regions, and 100% of consumption in medium water stress regions. Apple have also shared their goal to replenish all corporate freshwater withdrawals in high-stress locations by 2030, and as of 2024 they claim to be 40% of the way to achieving this.

There are also innovative solutions being developed to try to make data centres themselves more sustainable, such as Google using non-potable water at over 25% of its data centers, and developing new techniques using either low-water alternatives or recycled wastewater to try to reduce their water footprint. Furthermore, their Hamina data center in Finland uses sea water for cooling which is heated and then cooled again before being returned to the sea. Microsoft are attempting to utilize adiabatic cooling which substitutes the water for outside air, as well as developing Project Natick to try to build a submerged data center which makes use of the sea temperature for cooling.

==== Artificial intelligence ====
The rapid growth of artificial intelligence poses some serious environmental concerns one of which is its exceptionally high water footprint. To function, AI technology requires vast amounts of data therefore data centers are growing across the world. These data centers use water in two ways: direct and indirect. They directly use vast amounts of electricity which need to be generated and this requires significant amounts of water and they indirectly use large quantities of water for cooling. This cooling occurs by circulating water through the data center which absorbs heat. As a result of this data centers have an exceptionally high water footprint, and in particular AI data centers. This is a result of the higher level processing that AI requires so there is a higher energy usage therefore more water is needed to generate the electricity and more cooling is necessary.

The rate of AI development has been rapid in recent years, with data centers expected to account for 3.5 percent of the world's electricity use by 2030. This rapid development, in particular with regard to water usage, have sparked concern amongst the global community, particularly in areas already facing water scarcity. Whilst it is difficult to know exactly the statistics behind the water usage of AI, due to a lack of available statistics directly from the companies themselves, we can see the impact through examples such as the Great Salt Lake Basin, which is host to a number of data centers as a result of its cheap water, but which is experiencing new lows in water level year on year.

=== Domestic sector ===
The water footprint of an individual refers to the sum of their direct and indirect freshwater use. The direct water use is the water used at home, while the indirect water use relates to the total volume of freshwater that is used to produce the goods and services consumed.

The average global water footprint of an individual is 1,385 m^{3} per year. Residents of some example nations have water footprints as shown in the table:

Nation	annual water footprint
China	1,071 m^{3}
Finland	1,733 m^{3}
India	1,089 m^{3}
United Kingdom	1,695 m^{3}
United States	2,842 m^{3}

== By region ==
=== Water footprint of nations ===
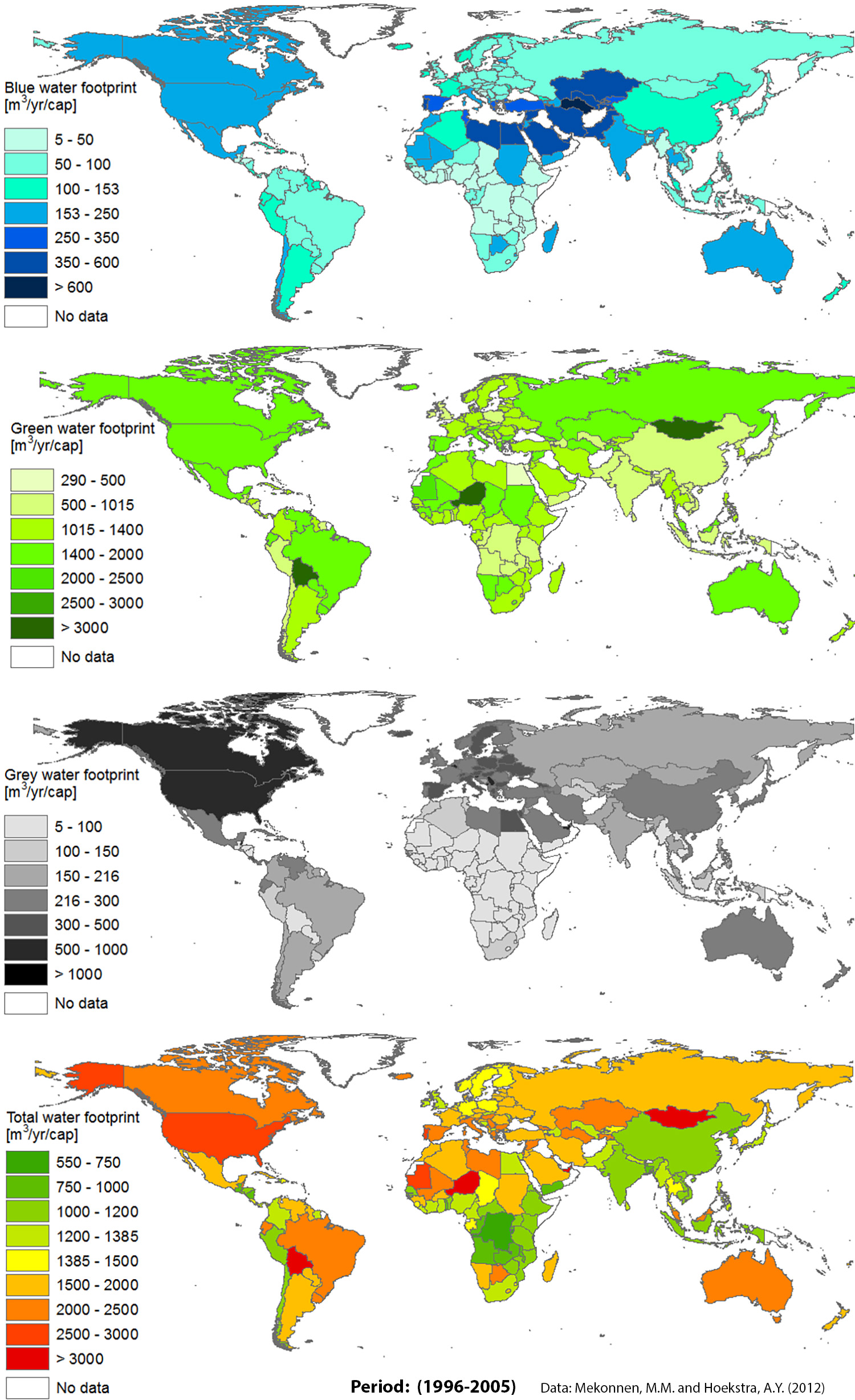
Global view of national per capita water footprints

The water footprint of a nation is the amount of water used to produce the goods and services consumed by the inhabitants of that nation. Analysis of the water footprint of nations illustrates the global dimension of water consumption and pollution, by showing that several countries rely heavily on foreign water resources and that (consumption patterns in) many countries significantly and in various ways impact how, and how much, water is being consumed and polluted elsewhere on Earth. International water dependencies are substantial and are likely to increase with continued global trade liberalisation. The largest share (76%) of the virtual water flows between countries is related to international trade in crops and derived crop products. Trade in animal products and industrial products contributed 12% each to the global virtual water flows. The four major direct factors determining the water footprint of a country are: volume of consumption (related to the gross national income); consumption pattern (e.g. high versus low meat consumption); climate (growth conditions); and agricultural practice (water use efficiency).

==== Production or consumption ====
The assessment of total water use in connection to consumption can be approached from both ends of the supply chain. The water footprint of production estimates how much water from local sources is used or polluted in order to provide the goods and services produced in that country. The water footprint of consumption of a country looks at the amount of water used or polluted (locally, or in the case of imported goods, in other countries) in connection with all the goods and services that are consumed by the inhabitants of that country. The water footprint of production and that of consumption, can also be estimated for any administrative unit such as a city, province, river basin or the entire world.

==== Absolute or per capita ====
The absolute water footprint is the total sum of water footprints of all people. A country's per capita water footprint (that nation's water footprint divided by its number of inhabitants) can be used to compare its water footprint with those of other nations.

The global water footprint in the period 1996–2005 was 9.087 billion m^{3}/yr (billion cubic metres per year, or 9,087,000,000,000,000 liters/year), of which 74% was and green, 11% blue, 15% grey. This is an average amount per capita of 1.385 billion m^{3}/yr., or 3.800 liters per person per day. On average 92% of this is embedded in agricultural products consumed, 4.4% in industrial products consumed, and 3.6% is domestic water use. The global water footprint related to producing goods for export is 1.762 billion m^{3}/y.

In absolute terms, India is the country with the largest water footprint in the world, a total of 987 billion m^{3}/yr. In relative terms (i.e. taking population size into account), the people of the USA have the largest water footprint, with 2480 m^{3}/yr per capita, followed by the people in south European countries such as Greece, Italy and Spain (2300–2400 m^{3}/yr per capita). High water footprints can also be found in Malaysia and Thailand. In contrast, the Chinese people have a relatively low per capita water footprint with an average of 700 m^{3}/yr. (These numbers are also from the period 1996–2005.)

==== Internal or external ====
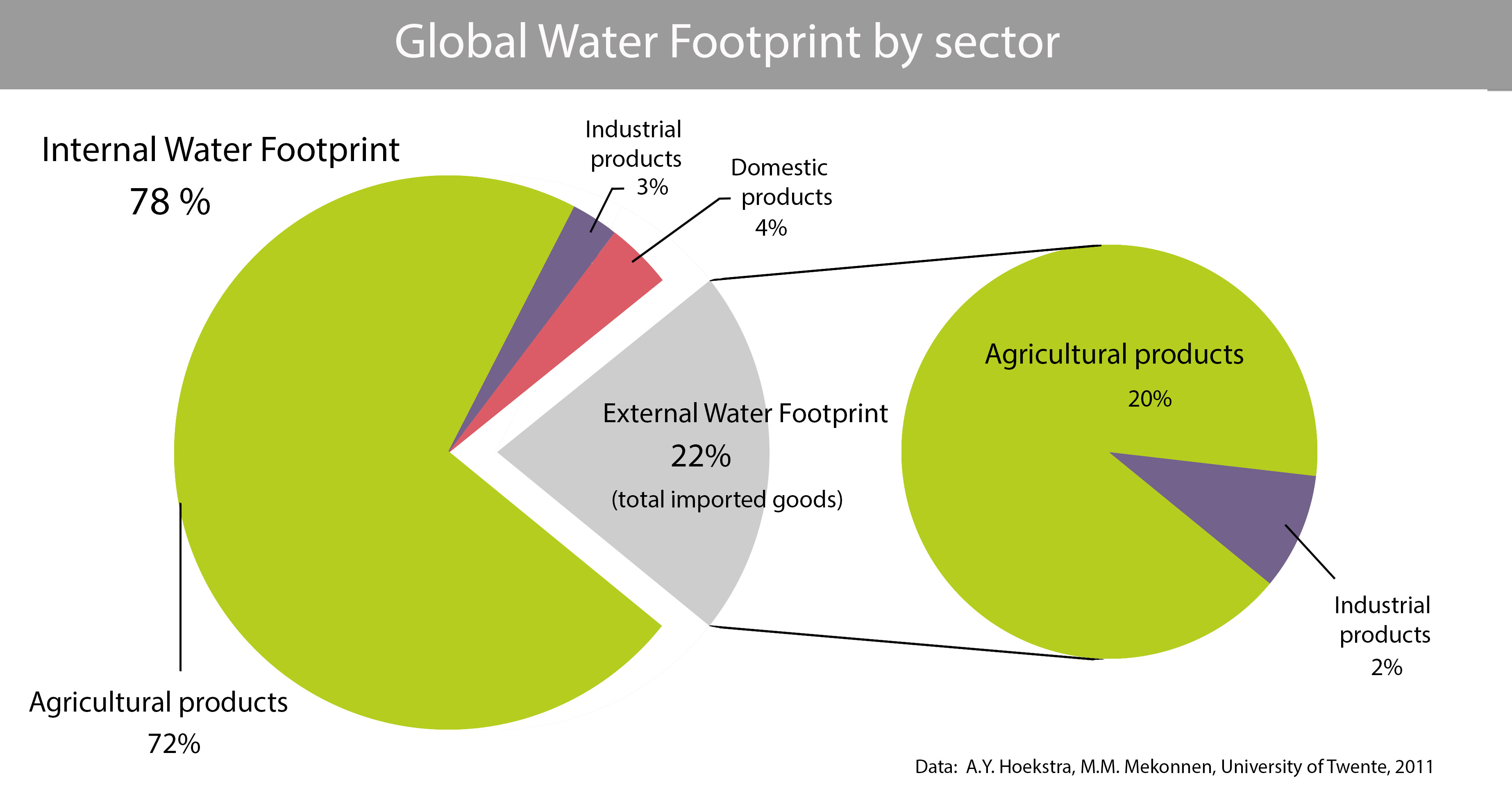
Global average numbers and composition of all national water footprints, internal and external

The internal water footprint is the amount of water used from domestic water resources; the external water footprint is the amount of water used in other countries to produce goods and services imported and consumed by the inhabitants of the country. When assessing the water footprint of a nation, it is crucial to take into account the international flows of virtual water (also called embodied water, i.e. the water used or polluted in connection to all agricultural and industrial commodities) leaving and entering the country. When taking the use of domestic water resources as a starting point for calculating a nation's water footprint, one should subtract the virtual water flows that leave the country and add the virtual water flows that enter the country.

The external part of a nation's water footprint varies strongly from country to country. Some African nations, such as Sudan, Mali, Nigeria, Ethiopia, Malawi and Chad have hardly any external water footprint, simply because they have little import. Some European countries on the other hand—e.g. Italy, Germany, the UK and the Netherlands—have external water footprints that constitute 50–80% of their total water footprint. The agricultural products that on average contribute most to the external water footprints of nations are: bovine meat, soybean, wheat, cocoa, rice, cotton and maize.

The top 10 gross virtual water exporting nations, which together account for more than half of the global virtual water export, are the United States (314 billion m^{3}/year), China (143 billion m^{3}/year), India (125 billion m^{3}/year), Brazil (112 billion m^{3}/year), Argentina (98 billion m^{3}/year), Canada (91 billion m^{3}/year), Australia (89 billion m^{3}/year), Indonesia (72 billion m^{3}/year), France (65 billion m^{3}/year), and Germany (64 billion m^{3}/year).

The top 10 gross virtual water importing nations are the United States (234 billion m^{3}/year), Japan (127 billion m^{3}/year), Germany (125 billion m^{3}/year), China (121 billion m^{3}/year), Italy (101 billion m^{3}/year), Mexico (92 billion m^{3}/year), France (78 billion m^{3}/year), the United Kingdom (77 billion m^{3}/year), and The Netherlands (71 billion m^{3}/year).

=== Water use in continents ===
==== Europe ====
Each EU citizen consumes 4,815 litres of water per day on average; 44% is used in power production primarily to cool thermal plants or nuclear power plants. Energy production annual water consumption in the EU 27 in 2011 was, in billion m^{3}: for gas 0.53, coal 1.54 and nuclear 2.44. Wind energy avoided the use of 387 million cubic metres (mn m^{3}) of water in 2012, avoiding a cost of €743 million.

==== Asia ====
In south India the state Tamil Nadu is one of the main agricultural producers in India and it relies largely in groundwater for irrigation. In ten years, from 2002 to 2012, the Gravity Recovery and Climate Experiment calculated that the groundwater reduced in 1.4 m yr−1, which "is nearly 8% more than the annual recharge rate."

== Environmental water use ==
Although agriculture's water use includes provision of important terrestrial environmental values (as discussed in the "Water footprint of products" section above), and much "green water" is used in maintaining forests and wild lands, there is also direct environmental use (e.g. of surface water) that may be allocated by governments. For example, in California, where water use issues are sometimes severe because of drought, about 48 percent of "dedicated water use" in an average water year is for the environment (somewhat more than for agriculture). Such environmental water use is for keeping streams flowing, maintaining aquatic and riparian habitats, keeping wetlands wet, etc.

== Criticism ==
=== Insufficient consideration of consequences of proposed water saving policies to farm households ===
According to Dennis Wichelns of the International Water Management Institute: "Although one goal of virtual water analysis is to describe opportunities for improving water security, there is almost no mention of the potential impacts of the prescriptions arising from that analysis on farm households in industrialized or developing countries. It is essential to consider more carefully the inherent flaws in the virtual water and water footprint perspectives, particularly when seeking guidance regarding policy decisions."

=== Regional water scarcity should be taken into account when interpreting water footprint ===
The application and interpretation of water footprints may sometimes be used to promote industrial activities that lead to facile criticism of certain products. For example, the 140 litres required for coffee production for one cup might be of no harm to water resources if its cultivation occurs mainly in humid areas, but could be damaging in more arid regions. Other factors such as hydrology, climate, geology, topography, population and demographics should also be taken into account. Nevertheless, high water footprint calculations do suggest that environmental concern may be appropriate.

Many of the criticisms, including the above ones, compare the description of the water footprint of a water system to generated impacts, which is about its performance. Such a comparison between descriptive and performance factors and indicators is basically flawed.

=== Disproportionality in Measuring the Effects of Grey Water ===
In regards to grey water footprints, the current system has difficulties when it comes to accurately depicting the effect of pollution and dilution based contributions towards water footprints as opposed to usage. The effects of contamination are not considered to be different from that of scarcity, though the two have different effects on both human life and the environment.

It is possible for many different waste byproducts to have effects on an ecosystem, and common water footprints approaches that only test for a few of these byproducts do not capture the complete harm done to the environment. One form of unaccounted for environmental degradation can be found in marine ecosystem degradation. One of the most widely considered concerns in marine ecosystem degradation pertains to eutrophication, which is measured by the amount of nitrogen emitted by a body of water. However, it is also possible for industrial waste to have other contaminants in the water, such as other oils or compounds, that can not be measured in the same way that eutrophication can, and therefore will not be accounted for in degradation reports without proper testing methods of their own.

Waste byproducts also affect the quality of drinking water in a similar manner. In China, the byproducts of industrial waste result in heavy metals and salts being polluted into the public water supply. Though water footprints methods do account for the actual water polluted by the contaminants, it does not factor in the amount of water needed to dilute the contaminated water in order to get it to reasonable levels. A similar phenomenon can be seen in an analysis on California's water usage. Whereas the blue and green water components were able to be traced by researchers, the gray water component proved to be difficult to obtain data for by comparison. Therefore, due to a lack of consideration of all factors, water footprints fails to capture the entirety of the impact of industrial waste. If the effects of a process on the environment are unclear during the process of water footprints, it decreases the accuracy of the resulting report.

=== Effects of Location and Globalization on Water Footprints ===
Water footprints also have difficulties when attempting to trace the total environmental impact on a global scale, as opposed to the effect in a singular area. With the globalization of the economy and how multiple processes are involved in the creation of a product, different procedures may have different impacts on the environment. However, these processes can not be measured using general metrics, as the procedures that one facility may use to complete that process, be through necessity or efficiency, may not necessarily be the same as another facility tasked with the same procedure. This introduces spatiality - that is, the location from which waste originates - as another axis of consideration in the problem of evaluating water footprints. These implications apply to water footprints, as the environmental effects and contribution to scarcity similarly can not be assessed through generalization.

The spatial effects can also be observed when looking at the concepts of direct and indirect water footprints. Direct water footprint can be defined as water that is used at a specific site to generate or maintain conditions necessary to create a given product. Indirect water footprint can be defined as water that is used to complete the intermediate steps required for many products, such as harvesting foods or fuel sources. While direct water footprint can be measured by taking reports from a specific facility to the amount of water that they use or dilute, indirect water footprints brings their own complications. Indirect water footprints tend to have high variability due to geographical factors. For instance, One proponent of indirect water foot printing is tracing the amount of water used to extract the raw petroleum needed to transport a commodity. Since the amount of fuel used depends on the distance a shipment needs to travel, it can vary greatly between countries, depending on how far resources need to be transported. The multifaceted nature of indirect water footprint sources makes it difficult to accurately assess all of the separate aspects contributing to a product, and even more so the total impact.

Though these criticisms bring merit, these problems are somewhat reduced when water footprint is not used as a lone indicator, but is instead interpreted in context. On the topic of grey water, adequate consideration of all possible consequences of industrial processes can do well to alleviate these issues. When a well-rounded measurement is taken of all of the pollutants that a form of waste can introduce to the environment, it greatly enhances the accuracy of the calculation. On the issue of spatial differences, the use of water availability as a factor assists in determining the proportion of water in a given area a certain water footprint applies to. When data relevant to the specific situation is gathered, both about water and process used and different spatial factors, it becomes more feasible to extrapolate calculations using the water footprint system.

The use of the term footprint can also confuse people familiar with the notion of a carbon footprint, because the water footprint concept includes sums of water quantities without necessarily evaluating related impacts. This is in contrast to the carbon footprint, where carbon emissions are not simply summarized but normalized by CO_{2} emissions, which are globally identical, to account for the environmental harm. The difference is due to the somewhat more complex nature of water; while involved in the global hydrological cycle, it is expressed in conditions both local and regional through various forms like river basins, watersheds, on down to groundwater (as part of larger aquifer systems). Furthermore, looking at the definition of the footprint itself, and comparing ecological footprint, carbon footprint and water footprint, we realize that the three terms are indeed legitimate.

== Sustainable water use ==
Sustainable water use involves the rigorous assessment of all source of clean water to establish the current and future rates of use, the impacts of that use both downstream and in the wider area where the water may be used and the impact of contaminated water streams on the environment and economic well-being of the area. It also involves the implementation of social policies such as water pricing in order to manage water demand. In some localities, water may also have spiritual relevance and the use of such water may need to take account of such interests. For example, the Maori believe that water is the source and foundation of all life and have many spiritual associations with water and places associated with water. On a national and global scale, water sustainability requires strategic and long term planning to ensure appropriate sources of clean water are identified and the environmental and economic impact of such choices are understood and accepted. The re-use and reclamation of water is also part of sustainability including downstream impacts on both surface waters and ground waters.

=== Sustainability assessment ===
Water footprint accounting has advanced substantially in recent years, however, water footprint analysis also needs sustainability assessment as its last phase. One of the developments is to employ sustainable efficiency and equity ("Sefficiency in Sequity"), which present a comprehensive approach to assessing the sustainable use of water.

== Sectoral distributions of withdrawn water use ==
Several nations estimate sectoral distribution of use of water withdrawn from surface and groundwater sources. For example, in Canada, in 2005, 42 billion m^{3} of withdrawn water were used, of which about 38 billion m^{3} were freshwater. Distribution of this use among sectors was: thermoelectric power generation 66.2%, manufacturing 13.6%, residential 9.0%, agriculture 4.7%, commercial and institutional 2.7%, water treatment and distribution systems 2.3%, mining 1.1%, and oil and gas extraction 0.5%. The 38 billion m^{3} of freshwater withdrawn in that year can be compared with the nation's annual freshwater yield (estimated as streamflow) of 3,472 billion m^{3}. Sectoral distribution is different in many respects in the US, where agriculture accounts for about 39% of fresh water withdrawals, thermoelectric power generation 38%, industrial 4%, residential 1%, and mining (including oil and gas) 1%.

Within the agricultural sector, withdrawn water use is for irrigation and for livestock. Whereas all irrigation in the US (including loss in conveyance of irrigation water) is estimated to account for about 38 percent of US withdrawn freshwater use, the irrigation water used for production of livestock feed and forage has been estimated to account for about 9 percent, and other withdrawn freshwater use for the livestock sector (for drinking, washdown of facilities, etc.) is estimated at 0.7 percent. Because agriculture is a major user of withdrawn water, changes in the magnitude and efficiency of its water use are important. In the US, from 1980 (when agriculture's withdrawn water use peaked) to 2010, there was a 23 percent reduction in agriculture's use of withdrawn water, while US agricultural output increased by 49 percent over that period.

In the US, irrigation water application data are collected in the quinquennial Farm and Ranch Irrigation Survey, conducted as part of the Census of Agriculture. Such data indicate great differences in irrigation water use within various agricultural sectors. For example, about 14 percent of corn-for-grain land and 11 percent of soybean land in the US are irrigated, compared with 66 percent of vegetable land, 79 percent of orchard land and 97 percent of rice land.

== See also ==
- Carbon footprint
- Carbon intensity
- Deficit irrigation
- Ecological footprint
- Runoff footprint
- Social metabolism
- Virtual water
- Water resource management
- Water resources
- Water scarcity
- Water positive
