= Water resource policy =

Policy-making processes and legislation that affect water resources

Water resource policy, sometimes called water resource management or water management, encompasses the policy-making processes and legislation that affect the collection, preparation, use, disposal, and protection of water resources. The long-term viability of water supply systems poses a significant challenge as a result of water resource depletion, climate change, and population expansion.

Water is a necessity for all forms of life as well as industries on which humans are reliant, like technology development and agriculture. This global need for clean water access necessitates water resource policy to determine the means of supplying and protecting water resources. Water resource policy varies by region and is dependent on water availability or scarcity, the condition of aquatic systems, and regional needs for water. Since water basins do not align with national borders, water resource policy is also determined by international agreements, also known as hydropolitics. Water quality protection also falls under the umbrella of water resource policy; laws protecting the chemistry, biology, and ecology of aquatic systems by reducing and eliminating pollution, regulating its usage, and improving the quality are considered water resource policy. When developing water resource policies, many different stakeholders, environmental variables, and considerations have to be taken to ensure the health of people and ecosystems are maintained or improved. Finally, ocean zoning, coastal, and environmental resource management are also encompassed by water resource management, like in the instance of offshore wind land leasing.

As water scarcity increases with climate change, the need for robust water resource policies will become more prevalent. An estimated 57% of the world's population will experience water scarcity at least one month out of the year by 2050. Mitigation and updated water resource policies will require interdisciplinary and international collaboration, including government officials, environmental scientists, sociologists, economists, climate modelers, and activists.

World water availability

== Water as a resource ==
When considering its utility as a resource and developing water resource policy, water can be classified into 4 different categories: green, blue, gray, and virtual water. Blue water is surface and groundwater, like water in rivers, lakes, and aquifers. Green water is rainwater that was precipitated on soil that can be used naturally for plants and agriculture. Gray water is water that has been contaminated by human use or proximity. The gray water classification can range from freshwater fertilizer runoff pollution to water contaminated from dishwashers and showers. Virtual water is the water consumed to make an agricultural or industrial product. Calculating virtual water of a commodity is used to determine the water footprint of a country and see how much water they are importing and exporting through their goods.

== Types ==
=== Agreements between nations ===
Water basins do not align with national borders and an estimated 60% of worldwide freshwater flows across political boundaries. Countries navigate managing shared water resources by making agreements in the form of treaties. Treaties between nations may enumerate policies, rights and responsibilities. The Permanent Court of International Justice adjudicates disputes between nations, including water rights litigation. An estimated 3600 water treaties have existed, including the introduction of more than 150 new ones since 1950. Transboundary water agreements, like treaties, are oftentimes focused on water infrastructure and quality. Water resource treaties encompass many types of water like surface water, groundwater, watercourses, and dams. When a water resource can be shared equally, like a river acting as a border between nations, there tends to be less conflict than upstream/downstream water resource sharing agreements. Sometimes treaties establish joint committees between the two or more nations to oversee all water sharing and to ensure that treaty agreements are being met. Two examples of this are the 1996 Ganges Treaty between India and Bangladesh and the 1955 Great Lakes Basin Compact between the United States and Canada. With increasing water scarcity and competition for water resources due to climate change and diminished water quality, there has been an increase in international water-based conflict.

Another example of a water resource interstate agreement is through multi-country agreements to get funding for water resource projects such as building hydropower dams. In Sub-Saharan African countries, China has financed many hydropower projects.

=== Covenants and declarations ===
In Water Resource Policy, covenants and declarations are nonbinding goals for reaching universal human access to water for drinking and sanitation purposes. The United Nations has adopted three covenants and declarations: the 1948 Declaration of Human Rights, the 1966 International Covenant on Civil and Political Rights, and the 1966 International Covenant on Economic, Social, and Cultural Rights. Since the 1996 International Covenant on Economic, Social, and Cultural Rights declaration, all 191 UN member states have also signed the Millennium Development Goals, which is a further commitment to combat health inequalities. Access to safe and clean water for drinking and sanitation were fully declared human rights on July 28, 2010 through the UN General Assembly resolution A/RES/64/292.

=== Management rules and regulations ===
Water management rules and regulations dictate different national standards for water quality, like drinking water and environmental water quality standards. For example, in the United States, the Safe Drinking Water Act authorizes the Environmental Protection Agency to set the national standards for safe drinking water and set regulations for contaminants. Within the European Union, the European Environment Agency enacted the Water Framework Directive in 2000 to regulate water resource planning, management, and protection. In India, the Ministry of Environment and Forests sets the water management policies that the Central Pollution Control Board and the State Pollution Control Boards then enforce. The Ministry for Environmental Protection directions national efforts for water management and regulation in China, like the Law on Prevention and Control of Water Pollution.

=== Aid programs and diplomatic efforts ===
Several global organizations have created aid programs and diplomatic efforts to see that progress is being made towards achieving global covenants and declarations regarding water resource access. Because health is closely tied to drinking water and sanitation access, UNICEF and the World Health Organization formed the Joint Monitoring Programme for Water Supply and Sanitation focused exclusively on monitoring and reporting progress on water, sanitation and hygiene goals as dictated by the UN. In 1977, the United Nations convened for a Conference on Water in Mar del Plata to develop recommendations for national water policy. Subsequently, the United Nations declared the 1980s as the International Drinking-water Supply and Sanitation Decade. In 2000, the UN sanctioned a task force led by UNESCO, World Water Assessment Programme, to report on worldwide freshwater use and sustainability in the World Water Development Report. In 2003, UN-Water was formed as an interagency coordination tool to help countries achieve their water resource goals as set by the Millennium Development Goals and make global water governance frameworks. Additionally, the United Nations declared 2013 as the International Year of Water Cooperation. As well as the United Nations' interest in water resource policy for the benefit of human health, the United Nations Environmental Programme has also done work to improve international water quality.

Non-profits and non-governmental organizations also play a role in water resource policy. For example, the World Water Council is an international think tank established in 1996 to help countries and stakeholders with water resource management strategies. Additionally, the US Agency for International Development (USAID) developed a Water and Development Strategy in 2013 to help people improve water supply, sanitation, and hygiene (WASH) programs and help with water resource management.

=== Economic exchanges ===
Water Resource Policy also encompasses the economic exchange of water, known as virtual water. The term virtual water is used to understand and quantify the volume of water required for a product or service. For example, when determining the virtual water trade for agricultural goods, the trade flow rate (ton/yr) would be multiplied by the virtual water content (m^{3}/ton) of each type of produce or livestock to determine how much water was exchanged in addition to the good. According to these calculations for virtual water, India, the United States, and China are the top national consumers for virtual water. Critiques for this method have questioned virtual water's relevance in creating water resource policy, but understanding the trade of water may be useful for countries facing water scarcity to prioritize importation of virtual water instead of exportation of water-intensive goods and services.

=== Business water resource policy initiatives ===
The World Business Council for Sustainable Development engages stakeholders in H2OScenarios that consider various alternative policies and their effects.

In June 2011 in Geneva, the Future of Water Virtual Conference addressed water resource sustainability. Issues raised included: water infrastructure monitoring, global water security, potential resource wars, interaction between water, energy, food and economic activity, the "true value" of "distribution portions of available water" and a putative "investment gap" in water infrastructure. It was asserted that climate change will affect scarcity of water but the water security presentation emphasized that a combined effect with population growth "could be devastating". Identified corporate water related risks include physical supply, regulatory and product reputation.

This forum indicated policy concerns with: trade barriers, price supports, treatment of water as a free good creates underpricing of 98% of water, need to intensify debate, and need to harmonize public/private sectors

== Issues ==
=== Environmental ===
Freshwater resources on earth are under increasing stress and depletion because of pollution, climate change, and consumptive use.

==== Flood ====
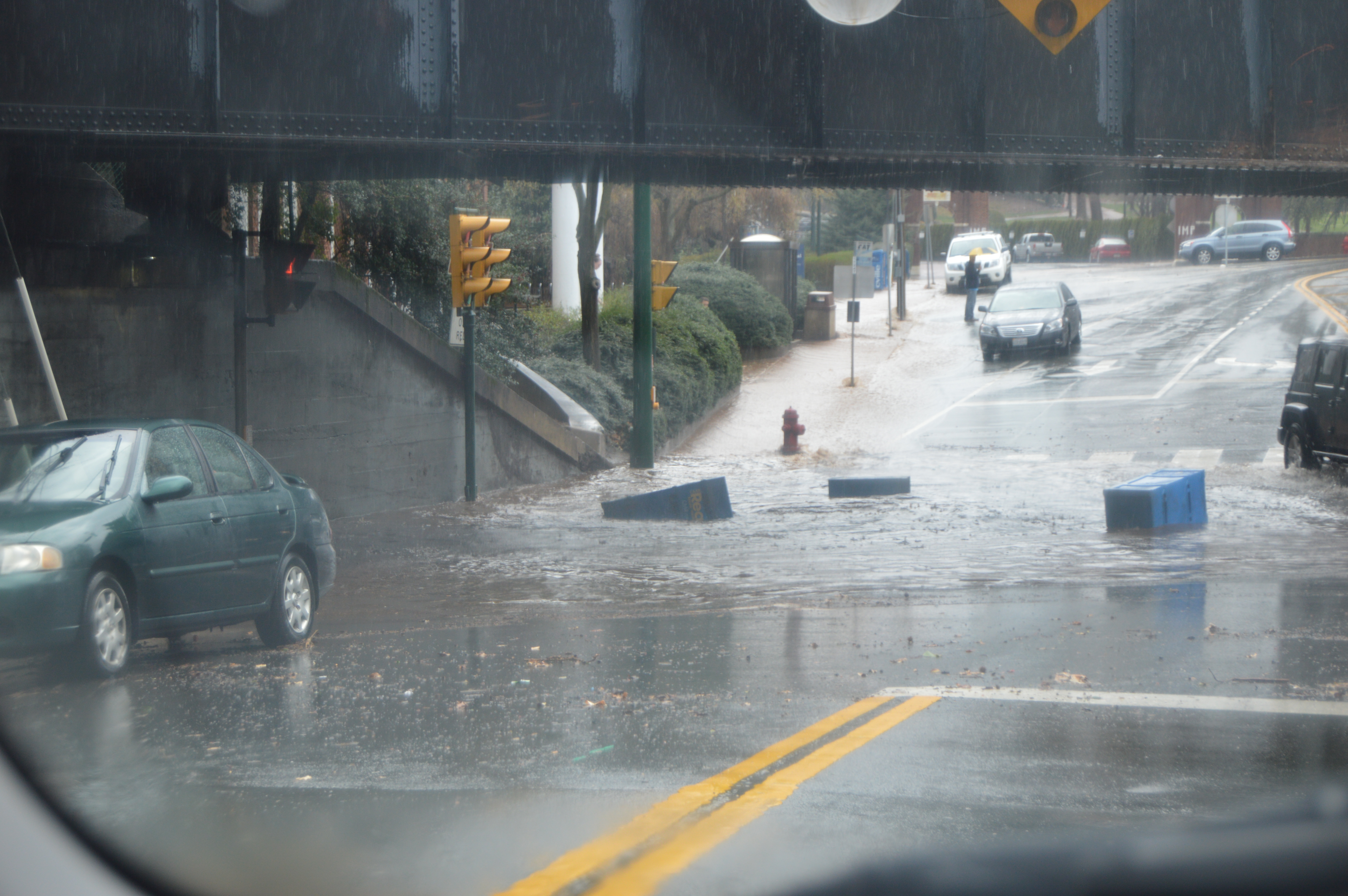
Flash flood in Charlottesville, Virginia, United States.

Water can produce a natural disaster in the form of tsunamis, hurricanes, rogue waves and storm surge. Land-based floods can originate from infrastructural issues like bursting dams or levee failure during surges, as well as environmental phenomena like rivers overflowing their banks during increased rainfall events, urban stormwater flooding, or snowmelt. The increased magnitude and frequency of floods are a result of urbanization and climate change. Urbanization increases stormwater runoff during large rain events. Surface runoff is water that flows when heavy rains do not infiltrate soil; excess water from rain, meltwater, or other sources flowing over the land. This is a major component of the water cycle. Runoff that occurs on surfaces before reaching a channel is also called a nonpoint source. When runoff flows along the ground, it can pick up soil contaminants including, but not limited to petroleum, pesticides, or fertilizers that become discharge or nonpoint source pollution.

Water resource policy encompasses flood risk management and development of infrastructure to mitigate damages from floods. Water resource policy solutions to flooding include land drainage for agriculture, urban planning focused on flood prevention, rainwater harvesting, and permeable surfacing of developed areas.

==== Drought ====
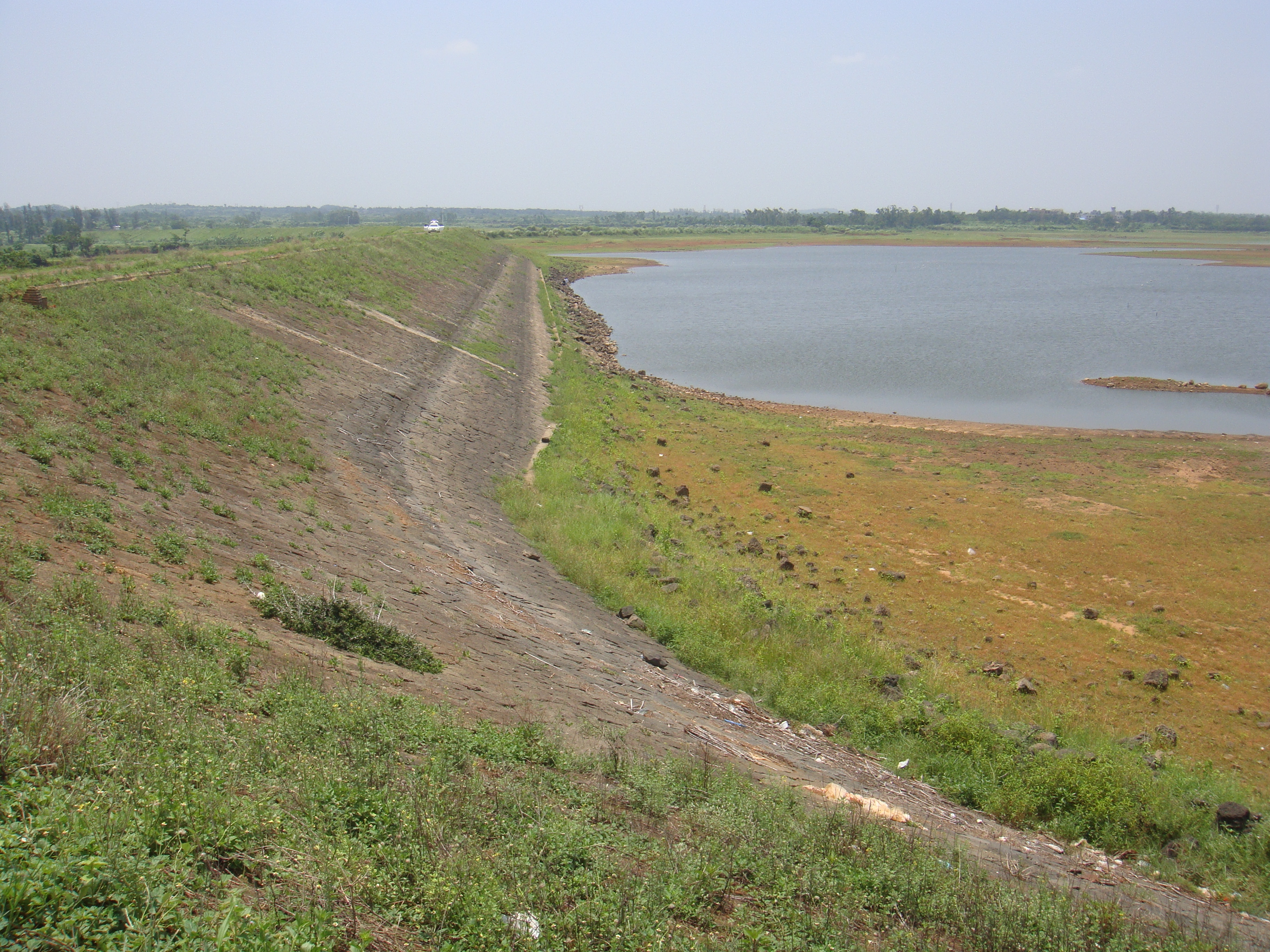
Partially emptied Yufeng Reservoir during a drought in 2015. Photo taken in Hainan, China.

A drought is defined as a period of dry conditions with either less precipitation or more depleted water reserves than normal. Because droughts are defined relative to the area's normal weather patterns and water availability, the definition varies from place to place. Overall, defining a drought takes into consideration 1.) the duration, intensity, and area of lessened precipitation or water availability and 2.) the estimated environmental, social and economic impact of the limited water. For example, in Colorado, paleohydrologic data, or tree rings from areas affected by drought, have been used to define drought extent and understand the impact of past droughts to improve future water resource planning and decision making.

With climate change, the frequency and intensity of droughts have been increasing but water resource policy is typically reactive instead of proactive. Droughts have negative economic impacts on many sectors including agriculture, environment, energy production and transportation. Local and national governments normally respond to droughts once they happen and are in crisis mode, whereas a robust policy would include early drought monitoring systems, preparedness plans, energy response programs, and impact assessment and management procedures to help mitigate the effects of drought on the economy and the environment. Different nations have different policies regarding national droughts. In 2013, the High-level Meeting on National Drought Policy (HMNDP) was organized by the World Meteorological Organization, the Secretariat of the United Nations Convention to Combat Desertification (UNCCD) and the Food and Agriculture Organization of the United Nations (FAO) to help nations develop drought preparedness policies and plans for international emergency relief efforts in the event of droughts. There were 414 participants from 87 countries that unanimously adopted the HMNDP declaration at the end of the meeting rallying national governments to implement drought management policies.

==== Oceans and salinity ====
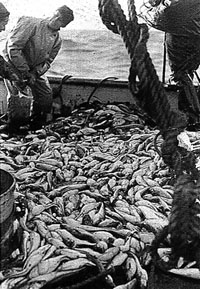
A White Hake fishery from the Northeast Fisheries Science Center (NOAA): http://www.nefsc.noaa.gov/history/

The oceans provide many important resources for the planet and humans including: transportation, marine life, food, minerals, oil, natural gas, and recreation. Water resource policy involving the ocean includes jurisdiction and regulation issues, pollution regulation and reduction, over exploitation prevention, and desalination to make drinking water.

National jurisdictions of the oceans are dictated by coastal proximity. Oceans along coastlines of nations are considered territories of that nation. For the first 12 nautical miles away from the nation's coastal border, the country has rights to the ocean for its resources, including fish and minerals, and it considered a continuation of that nation's territory. The countries' economic zone, consisting of both the water column and the seafloor, continues out for 200 nautical miles where they are still entitled to the areas' resources. On the other hand, the Antarctic and Southern Oceans are shared by 45 state parties under the Antarctic Treaty, so the status and ownership of Antarctic and Southern Ocean resources is unclear legally. Additionally, some areas are conserved as Marine Protected Areas (MPAs) and resource exploitation is prohibited. For example, by 1997 off the coast of California, there were 103 MPAs.

The oceans are becoming polluted and exploited for resources. With increasing carbon dioxide concentrations in the atmosphere from burning fossil fuels, the oceans are experiencing acidification. Decreasing the pH of the ocean makes it more difficult for marine organisms, like coral reefs, to make their calcium carbonate shells. Additionally, pollution is threatening oceanic resources, especially near coasts. Oil rigs and undersea mineral extraction can create problems that affect shorelines, marine life, fisheries and human safety. Decommissioning of such operations has another set of issues. Rigs-to-reefs is a proposal for using obsolete oil rigs as substrate for coral reefs that has failed to reach consensus. There have been oil tanker accidents and oil pipeline spills like the Exxon Valdez oil spill and the Deepwater Horizon oil spill. Ballast water, fuel/oil leaks and trash originating from ships foul harbors, reefs and estuaries pollute the oceans. Ballast water may contain toxins, invasive plants, animals, viruses, and bacteria. Additionally, marine debris, or industrially processed materials that have been dumped in the oceans, threatens the wellbeing and biodiversity of marine organisms. Along coasts, oceans are threatened by land runoff that includes fertilizers, insecticides, chemicals, and organic pollutants that can cause algal blooms and dead zones.

Fisheries also have an effect on oceans and can fall under water resource policy rules. According to the UN Food and Agriculture Organization (FAO), 87% of the fisheries worldwide are either fully exploited or overexploited. Regional fisheries management organizations (RFMOs) control and oversee high sea fisheries under the UN Convention of the Law of the Sea (UNCLOS) and the UN FishStocks Agreement. Poor management by RFMOs, government subsidies for fish, and illegal fish catches have contributed to overfishing and over exploitation of ocean resources. Ecosystem-based fishery management (EBFM) is an attempt to correct some RFMO mismanagement by limiting biomass that is allowed to be removed by fisheries, and by making sure fishing is more targeted for the desired species. One problem EBFM tries to eliminate is bycatch, or unintentional catching of the wrong fish species. For example, white marlin, an endangered billfish, is mostly accidentally caught and killed by swordfish and tuna longline fisheries.

Desalination of seawater is becoming a resource for coastal nations needing freshwater for industry and drinking, particularly areas with over exploited groundwater aquifers and surface water, pollution of freshwater, or unreliable water supply due to climate change. Desalination is particularly popular in arid, water-stressed regions like Egypt, Jordan, Kuwait, Cyprus, Israel, Saudi Arabia, United Arab Emirates, Australia, and California, US.

==== Freshwater ====
===== Surface and groundwater =====
Surface water and groundwater can be studied and managed as separate resources as a single resource in multiple forms. Jurisdictions typically distinguish three recognized groundwater classifications: subterranean streams, underflow of surface waters, and percolating groundwater.

===== Constituencies =====
Drinking water and water for utilitarian uses such as washing, crop cultivation and manufacture is competed for by various constituencies:

- Residential
- Agriculture. "Many rural people practice subsistence rain fed agriculture as a basic livelihood strategy, and as such are vulnerable to the effects of drought or flood that can diminish or destroy a harvest. "
- Construction
- Industrial
- Municipal or institutional activities

==== Surface water (runoff) and wastewater discharge ====
Regulatory bodies address piped waste water discharges to surface water that include riparian and ocean ecosystems. These review bodies are charged with protecting wilderness ecology, wildlife habitat, drinking water, agricultural irrigation and fisheries. Stormwater discharge can carry fertilizer residue and bacterial contamination from domestic and wild animals. They have the authority to make orders which are binding upon private actors such as international corporations and do not hesitate to exercise the police powers of the state. Water agencies have statutory mandate which in many jurisdictions is resilient to pressure from constituents and lawmakers in which they on occasion stand their ground despite heated opposition from agricultural interests On the other hand, the Boards enjoy strong support from environmental concerns such as Greenpeace, Heal the Ocean and Channelkeepers.

Water quality issues or sanitation concerns reuse or water recycling and pollution control which in turn breaks out into stormwater and wastewater.

==== Wastewater ====
Wastewater is water that has been discharged from human use. The primary discharges flow from the following sources: residences, commercial properties, industry, and agriculture.

Sewage is technically wastewater contaminated with fecal and similar animal waste byproducts, but is frequently used as a synonym for wastewater. Origination includes cesspool and sewage outfall pipes.

Water treatment is subject to the same overlapping jurisdictional constraints which affect other aspects of water policy. For instance, levels of chloramines with their resulting toxic trihalomethane by-product are subject to Federal guidelines even though water management implementing those policy constraints are carried out by local water boards.

=== Human right to water and sanitation ===
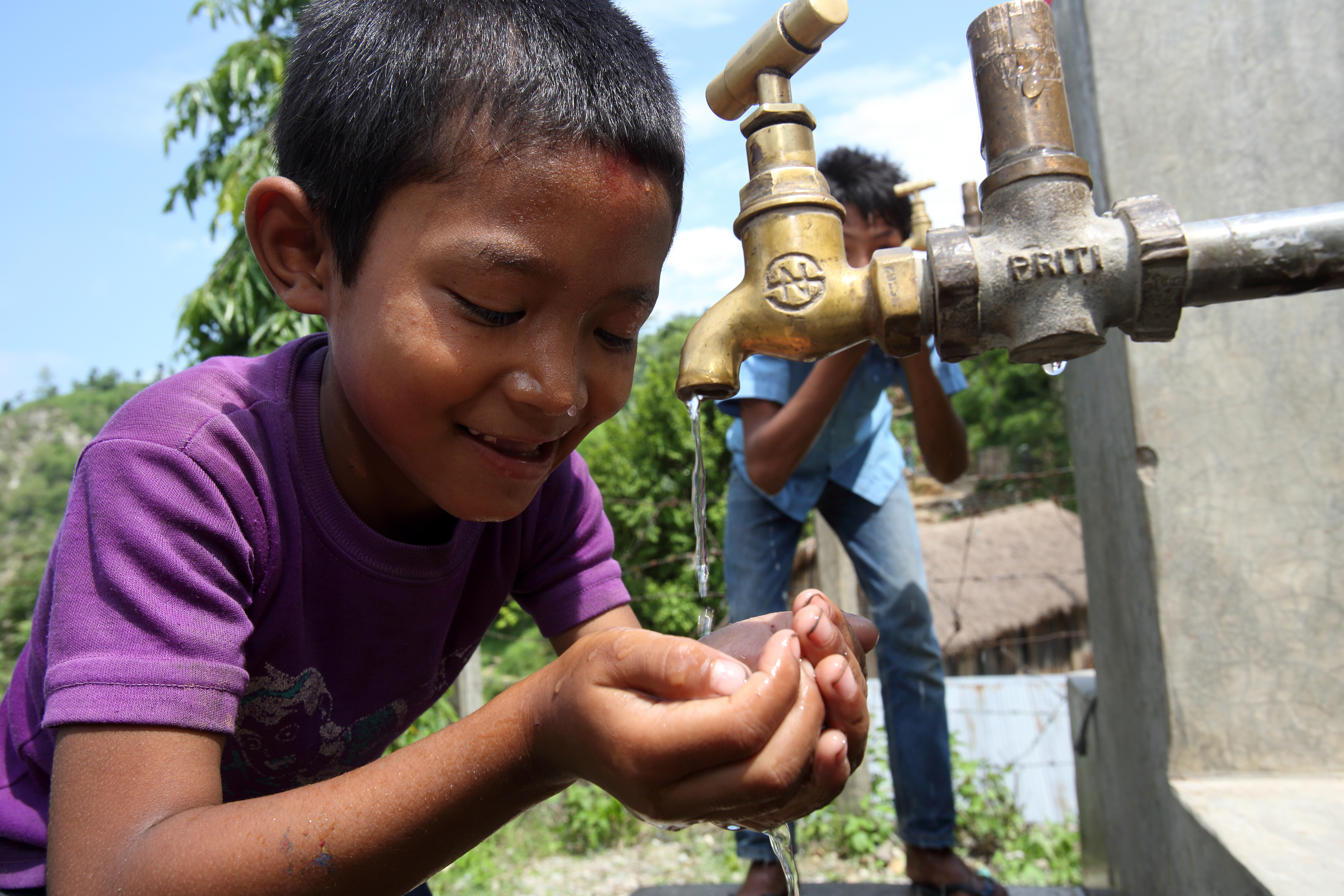
A boy drinks from a tap at a NEWAH WASH water project in Nepal

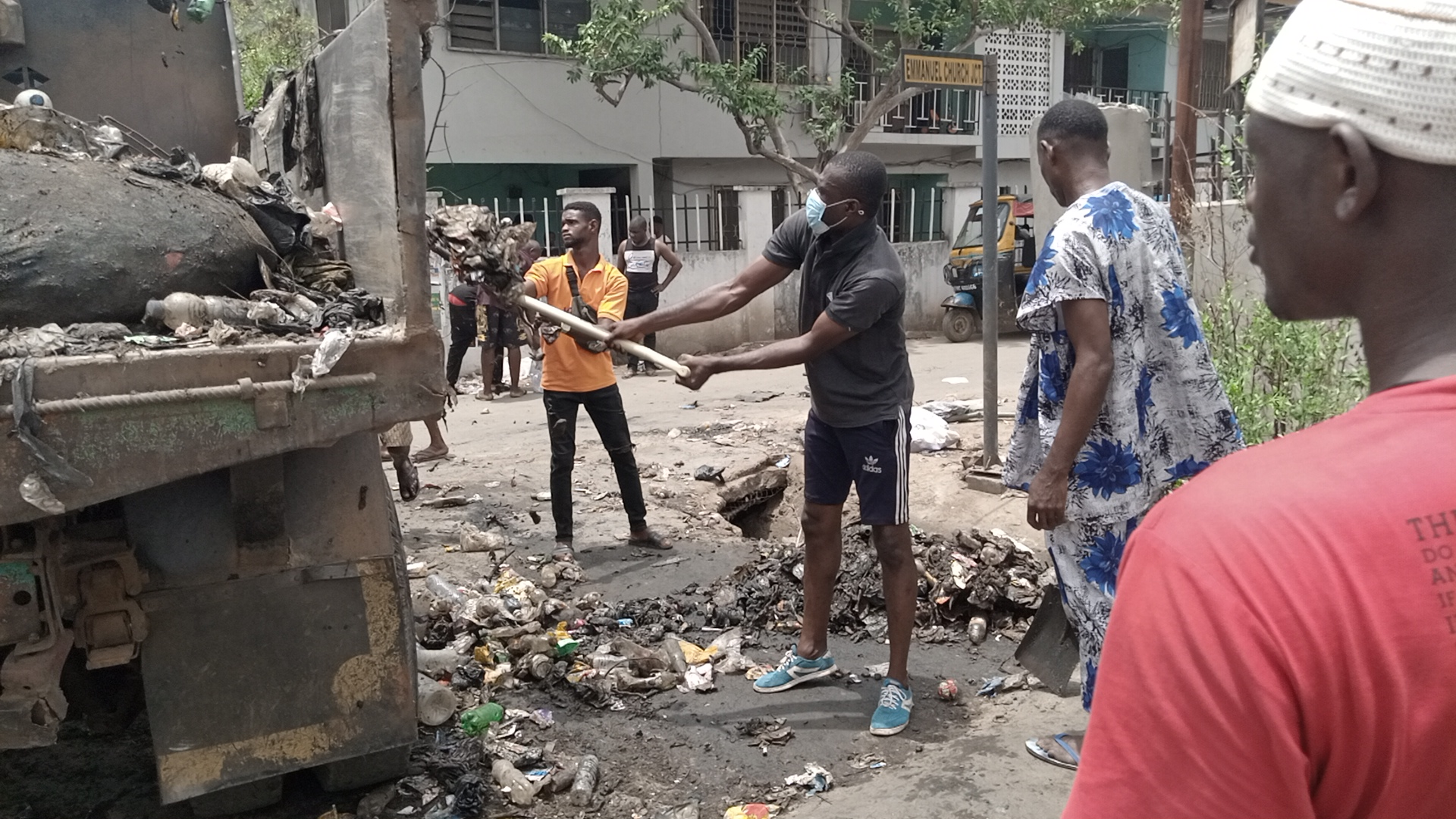
People sanitizing the environment in Nigeria

The human right to water and sanitation (HRWS) is a principle stating that clean drinking water and sanitation are a universal human right because of their high importance in sustaining every person's life. It was recognized as a human right by the United Nations General Assembly on 28 July 2010. The HRWS has been recognized in international law through human rights treaties, declarations and other standards. Other treaties that explicitly recognize the HRWS include the 1979 Convention on the Elimination of All Forms of Discrimination Against Women (CEDAW) and the 1989 Convention on the Rights of the Child (CRC).

The clearest definition of the human right to water was issued by the United Nations Committee on Economic, Social and Cultural Rights in General Comment 15 drafted in 2002. It was a non-binding interpretation that access to water was a condition for the enjoyment of the right to an adequate standard of living, inextricably related to the right to the highest attainable standard of health, and therefore a human right. It stated: "The human right to water entitles everyone to sufficient, safe, acceptable, physically accessible and affordable water for personal and domestic uses." and also stated that "The human right to sanitation entitles everyone to have physical and affordable access to sanitation, in all spheres of life, that is safe, secure, hygienic, and socially and culturally acceptable and that provides privacy and ensures dignity".

The first resolutions about the HRWS were passed by the UN General Assembly and the UN Human Rights Council in 2010. They stated that there was a human right to sanitation connected to the human right to water, since the lack of sanitation reduces the quality of water downstream, so subsequent discussions have continued emphasizing both rights together. In July 2010, United Nations (UN) General Assembly Resolution 64/292 reasserted the human right to receive safe, affordable, and clean accessible water and sanitation services. During that General Assembly, it stated that for the comprehension of enjoyment in life and all human rights, safe and clean drinking water as well as sanitation is acknowledged as a human right. General Assembly Resolution 64/292's assertion of a free human right of access to safe and clean drinking water and sanitation raises issues regarding governmental rights to control and responsibilities for securing that water and sanitation. The United Nations Development Programme has stated that broad recognition of the significance of accessing dependable and clean water and sanitation services will promote wide expansion of the achievement of a healthy and fulfilling life. A revised UN resolution in 2015 highlighted that the two rights were separate but equal.

The HRWS obliges governments to ensure that people can enjoy quality, available, acceptable, accessible, and affordable water and sanitation. Affordability of water considers the extent to which the cost of water becomes inhibitive such that it requires one to sacrifice access to other essential goods and services. Generally, a rule of thumb for the affordability of water is that it should not surpass 3–5% of households' income. Accessibility of water considers the time taken, convenience in reaching the source and risks involved while getting to the source of water. Water must be accessible to every citizen, meaning that water should not be further than 1,000 meters or 3,280 feet and must be within 30 minutes. Availability of water considers whether the supply of water is available in adequate amounts, reliable and sustainable. Quality of water considers whether water is safe for consumption, including for drinking or other activities. For acceptability of water, it must not have any odor and should not consist of any color.

The ICESCR requires signatory countries to progressively achieve and respect all human rights, including those of water and sanitation. They should work quickly and efficiently to increase access and improve service.

=== Structural constraints on policy makers ===
Policies are implemented by organizational entities created by government exercise of state power. However, all such entities are subject to constraints upon their autonomy.

==== Jurisdictional issues ====
Subject matter and geographic jurisdiction are distinguishable. The jurisdiction of any water agency is limited by political boundaries and by enabling legislation. In some cases, limits target specific types of uses (wilderness, agricultural, urban-residential, urban-commercial, etc.) A second part of jurisdictional limitation governs the subject matter that the agency controls, such as flood control, water supply and sanitation, etc. In many locations, agencies may face unclear or overlapping authority, increasing conflicts and delaying conflict resolution.

==== Typical information access issue ====
As reported by the non-partisan Civil Society Institute, a 2005 US Congressional study on water supply was suppressed and became the target of a Freedom of Information Act (FOIA) litigation.

==== Multi-jurisdictional issues ====
One jurisdiction's projects may cause problems in other jurisdictions. For instance, Monterey County, California controls a body of water that acts as a reservoir for San Luis Obispo County. The specific responsibilities for managing the resource must therefore be negotiated

== See also ==
- Aquifer
- Biotic index
- Clean Water Act
- Water consumption
- Drinking water quality in the United States
- Economic Instruments for Water Policies
- Energy law
- International Water Management Institute
- Marine Protection area
- Pollution
- Stormwater
- United Nations Environmental Programme
- Wastewater
- Water efficiency
- Water law in the United States
- Waterkeeper Alliance
- WELS rating
- Wet Infrastructure
