= Water positive =

Having a positive impact on water ecosystems

Water positive is the concept of water conservation by a company, community or individual that actively contributes to the sustainable management and restoration of water resources. This involves implementing practices and technologies that reduce water consumption, improve water quality and enhance water availability. The goal of being water positive is to leave a positive impact on water ecosystems and ensure that more water is conserved and restored than is used or depleted.

Although many corporations have focused on this issue primarily within their own operations, especially in regions with low water thresholds, organizations like the Water Resilience Coalition are committed to achieving a net positive water impact by the year 2050, encompassing their entire value chain. This commitment entails optimizing not only their direct operations but also considering and improving the impact throughout their supply chain.

== History ==
The idea of water positivity began in the construction industry in the early 2000s in India. This was in response to an agenda for optimizing construction practices by reducing their environmental impact through land and material reductions, as well as energy and water conservation, to produce "zero impact buildings." To conserve water, rain harvesting was considered to minimize dependence on freshwater consumption.

Interest in water positivity expanded to other domains and industries as concerns began to rise over the challenges of global freshwater scarcity. It can be coupled with the previous agenda of net zero emissions, sharing a common goal of restoring the environment through sustainable management of vital resources. Civil and corporate responsibilities aim to control resource consumption and manage waste to achieve a net positive impact. To achieve these goals, compensation incentives are introduced as credits (such as carbon credits or water-positive credits) that can be commercially exchanged between the seller (authorized carbon credit or water-positive holders) and buyers, promoting positive environmental impacts.

Like the compensation of greenhouse gases (GHG), the idea behind water positivity is to balance the water footprint by implementing measures for process efficiency, water purification, aquifer recharge, ecosystem conservation, and other water compensation projects. It focuses on managing this critical resource so that organizations contribute more to global water sustainability.

In 2023, the concept of Water Positive gained greater significance with the creation of the Water Positive Think Tank (WPTT), an initiative that brings together experts from various disciplines and regions around the world, committed to sustainable and regenerative water management. This group was formed in response to the growing urgency to implement measures that ensure the availability and quality of water resources in the near future. During the United Nations Water Conference in New York in March 2023, the founders of the WPTT recognized the call to action and the shared responsibility to drive effective solutions. In 2024, Daniele Strongone was appointed as its first president, with Esmeralda Leyva named as vice president.

== Expansion ==
Water positivity expanded globally in the 2000s, driven partly by the United Nations Millennium Development Goals relating to access to drinking water and the need for manufacturing industries to participate in water sustainability in their production.

Beverage companies like The Coca-Cola Company and PepsiCo established water positivity commitments for water-stressed regions by investing in water efficiency and community projects. They set goals to reduce the use of potable water per liter of product production, becoming models for other industries. In June 2007, Coca-Cola announced a multi-year partnership with World Wildlife Fund(WWF) on water conservation. E. Neville Isdell, Coca-Cola's chairman and CEO, said: "Our goal is to replace every drop of water we use in our beverages and their production. For us, that means reducing the amount of water used...recycling water used for manufacturing processes so it can be safely returned to the environment, and replenishing water in communities and nature through locally relevant projects."

With the UN Sustainable Development Goals established in 2015 and growing social pressure for companies to adopt environmentally sustainable practices, more companies across various industries publicly committed to the goal of being water positive by 2030 to 2050.

The surge in commitment to this initiative occurred after 2015, when Microsoft, Google, Ecolab, Unilever, Nestlé, AB InBev, Levi's, IKEA, Cargill, BP, Gap Inc., Colgate-Palmolive, Meta, Diageo, Starbucks, Danone, IBM, Procter & Gamble, Intel and Mars proposed drastic reductions in their operational water consumption, offsetting consumption by implementing strategies such as rainwater harvesting systems, water purification, reforestation projects, and aquifer recharge, among other initiatives, focusing on improving water-stressed basins.

On August 7, 2023, Canada Ocean Racing, an offshore sailing team competing in the IMOCA Globe Series), named its new team "Be Water Positive". The team partnered with Alex Thomson Racing, which managed British solo sailor Alex Thomson’s five Vendée Globe campaigns over the past 20 years. Canada Ocean Racing's goal was to be the first Canadian team to complete the Vendée Globe and build awareness of water positivity.

=== Strategies ===
The main strategies applied by companies and entities were presented at the United Nations Conference on Water held in New York City in 2023. It is assumed that by systematically following these guidelines and with long-term commitments, various companies have set goals to be water positive within 10 to 15 years. The strategies are:

- implementing technologies and processes to reduce direct and indirect water consumption through process optimization, circular production, and water recycling and reuse
- offsetting the residual water footprint through projects that increase and improve the availability and quality of water in impacted basins, such as the construction of wetlands and algal farms, treatment plants, reforestation, aquifer recharge, rainwater harvesting systems, among other innovations
- investing in research and development to implement new technologies that optimize water use
- establishing partnerships with NGOs, local communities, and other actors to advance integrated management of shared water resources
- promoting a culture of water sustainability among employees and consumers through awareness programs on the responsible use of water.
- establishing compensation incentives for the application of multiple barrier purification systems such as ultrafiltration, microfiltration, nanofiltration, reverse osmosis, ultraviolet radiation, or their combination that sustainably purify water and achieve water positive production goals.

=== Compensation ===
The water positive concept, through water purification using unconventional resources, was presented for the first time during the opening ceremony at the IDA 2022 World Congress during the “Charting Resilient Water Solutions” opening ceremony. The initiative was presented by IDA Vice President at that time, Alejandro Sturniolo.

The objective of water footprint compensation is to achieve a positive impact on global water resources. This is done by collaborating with various stakeholders to implement water purification systems in areas of scarcity, thus increasing the local supply. A more balanced trade in virtual water footprint, which is the water used to produce traded goods and services between regions, is also promoted.

Regulating this virtual water trade can improve the global efficiency of water use. Regions with abundant water resources could compensate part of the water footprint from regions with high water stress, thus helping to alleviate their dependence on virtual water imports. This two-pronged approach of increasing local supply and balancing trade between regions represents a comprehensive management of global water resources that only these decentralized treatments allow in a way similar to the carbon offset market.

== The Water Benefit Standard ==
The Water Benefit Standard launched in 2014, was the first globally consistent standard that certified the positive socio-economic impacts of water projects. The principles and safeguards from this standard have been embedded into the broader framework of the Gold Standard registry for Water Benefit Certificates. This ensures that any project that may have implications on water quality or access, actively manages any risks.
