= Arjen Hoekstra =

Dutch water resources engineer

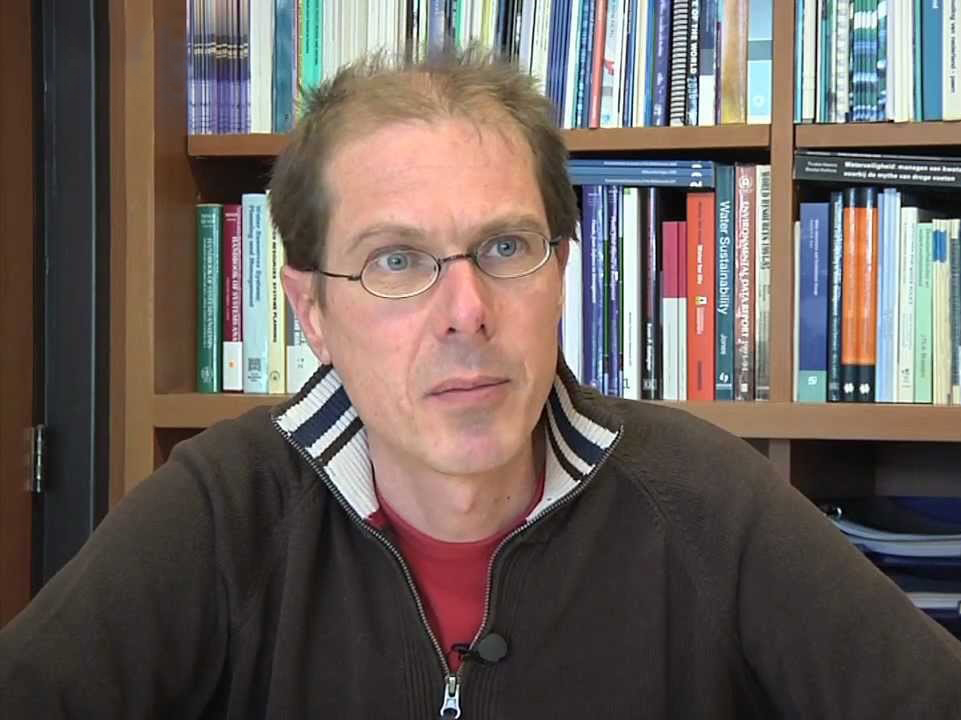
- Arjen Hoekstra, 2013
- Born: 28 June 1967
- Died: 18 November 2019 (aged 52)
- Citizenship: Dutch
- Occupation: Academic
- Known for: Water footprint

Arjen Hoekstra (June 28, 1967 - November 18, 2019) was a professor at the University of Twente who pioneered the concept of the water footprint - a way of measuring the extent of water consumption. His work drew attention to the hidden water use associated with a range of activities, and continues to have a profound effect both on scholarship and on environmental policy and activism. He strongly supported open source science, and all his articles were published under a Creative Commons License.

== Education ==
Hoekstra earned an MSc degree in Civil Engineering and a PhD in Policy Analysis from Delft University of Technology.

== Career ==
At the University of Twente, Arjen Hoekstra was Professor of Water Management and Chair of the Department of Multidisciplinary Water Management. He worked on a variety of interdisciplinary research projects, and advised a range of organisations about water consumption, these included governments, UNESCO, the World Bank, and Compassion in World Farming. As a professor, Hoekstra taught subjects such as: sustainable development, hydrology, natural resource valuation, environmental systems, and policy analysis. Throughout his career, Hoekstra's work gained international media attention and he was consistently referred to as an expert on the topic of water resource issues.

== Water footprint ==
The water footprint shows the extent of water use in relation to consumption by people. The water footprint of an individual, community or business is defined as the total volume of fresh water used to produce the goods and services consumed by the individual or community or produced by the business. Water use is measured in water volume consumed (evaporated) and/or polluted per unit of time. A water footprint can be calculated for any well-defined group of consumers (e.g., an individual, family, village, city, province, state or nation) or producers (e.g., a public organization, private enterprise or economic sector), for a single process (such as growing rice) or for any product or service.

Traditionally, water use has been approached from the production side, by quantifying the following three columns of water use: water withdrawals in the agricultural, industrial, and domestic sector. While this does provide valuable data, it is a limited way of looking at water use in a globalised world, in which products are not always consumed in their country of origin. International trade of agricultural and industrial products in effect creates a global flow of virtual water, or embodied water (akin to the concept of embodied energy).

In 2002, the water footprint concept was introduced in order to have a consumption-based indicator of water use, that could provide useful information in addition to the traditional production-sector-based indicators of water use. It is analogous to the ecological footprint concept introduced in the 1990s. The water footprint is a geographically explicit indicator, not only showing volumes of water use and pollution, but also the locations. Thus, it gives a grasp on how economic choices and processes influence the availability of adequate water resources and other ecological realities across the globe (and vice versa).

== Death ==
Hoekstra died unexpectedly in November, 2019. The cause of the death was unknown and expired when he was riding his bike back to his house. He is survived by a wife and children.

== Awards ==
- Hoekstra was awarded an honorary doctorate by the Gheorghe Asachi Technical University of Iaşi in Romania. (2012)

== Selected publications ==
- Hoekstra, Arjen. The Water Footprint of Modern Consumer Society (Routledge, 2013, 2020),
- Hoekstra, Arjen. The Water Footprint Assessment Manual (Earthscan, 2011)
- Hoekstra, Arjen. Globalization of Water (Wiley-Blackwell, 2008).
