= Economic instruments for water policies =

Economic Instruments for water policies are tools based on incentives ad disincentives; they change conditions to enable economic transactions or reduce risk, aiming at increasing environmental quality.

In a world of ever increasing water demand and decline in water availability and/or reliability, where water-related hazards are on rise, where climate change threatens to undo decades of development efforts, the only way to sustainability is a right mix of mutually strengthening policy instruments. In this policy mix, Economic Policy Instruments (EPIs) are best suited to foster an efficient allocation and use of water, reduce harmful exposure and impacts on the communities and environment, and protect natural capital. EPIs are regulations that encourage behaviour through market signals rather than through explicit directives”. They are a means of correcting market signals in order to convey the costs of externalities to economic actors (individuals as well as firms) which have generated them. Regarding water policies, economic instruments comprise regulations like those creating virtual market conditions (tradable permits), charges for public services, payments for ecosystem services, and transfer payments such as incentives based on taxation, levies, fees and royalties and subsidies. They represent an alternative to more traditional command and control instruments. Whereas already introduced into climate policies, air quality and energy policies, their application to water policies represents some specific challenges.

In Environmental Policy, economic instruments have received increasing attention over the last decades, and have been implemented to achieve environmental policy objectives such as climate policy under the form of Emission Trading. However, although EPIs have been proved to perform better than alternative instruments (command and control instruments or voluntary agreements) in other domains of environmental policies, their application to tackle water management issues (drought/water scarcity, floods, and water quality) are beset by many difficulties both of practical and ethical character: Despite the Dublin statement on sustainable water management adopted by the UN in 1992 which stating, in its fourth principle, that "Water has an economic value in all its competing uses and should be recognized as an economic good" the conception of water as an economic (and tradable) good is not accepted unanimously; especially Human rights groups see this principle in contradiction to the Right to water.

== Categories of instruments ==
=== Water tariffs ===
Charges for the use of water are among the best known economic instruments for water policies. They can contribute to the transmission of market signals which are coherent with policy aims, if their design is transparent and revenues are earmarked to uses connected to the service or to the mitigation of impacts from water uses. Charges for water uses potentially aim at different objectives: (a) redistribution the costs water service operators bear for water related services among the users, cover costs for service provision; (b) distribute social costs of resource uses, for instance environmental costs, among users, (c) attribute water uses to the economically most efficient type of uses according to their ability to pay for water uses.

== Environmental taxes ==
Taxes on the use of water as an environmental good, for instance on the use of ground water, can help internalizing negative environmental impacts and/or collect financial resources for the public budget. The earmarking of environmental taxes (making the use of the resources collected transparent and coherent to the environmental function of the tax) is a central issue for the acceptance of the tool.

== Environmental charges ==
Like environmental taxes, charges can transmit signals for internalizing negative environmental impacts and influence behaviour, and to collect financial resources that are allocated to support environmental friendly practices and projects.

=== Tradable permits ===
As water normally is not a traded good, the establishment of specific rights or tradeable permits are a means for using market mechanisms for the allocation of limited water resources. Creating virtual markets tradeable permits for water uses can improve the allocation (increase the efficiency) of resources to the economically most efficient uses. Virtual markets can be created either with regards to quantities of water to be used/abstracted or levels of pollution conceded to potential polluters.

EPI-Water Project Infos
Title: Evaluating Economic Policy Instruments for

Sustainable Water Management in Europe

Acronym: EPI-WATER
Project type: Collaborative project
Funding scheme: 7th Framework Programme

THEME ENV.2010.2.1.2-1: Evaluation of effectiveness of
economic instruments in integrated water policy

Start date: Jan., 1st 2011
End date: Dec., 31st 2013
Coordinator: Fondazione Eni Enrico Mattei, Milan, Italy
Consortium: 11 partners from 9 countries
Grant Agreement No: 265213
EU contribution: €3,472,438.00
Project Web Site: http://www.epi-water.eu
Key Words: Water management, Economic policy instruments,
ecosystem services, water efficiency

=== Subsidies on products or practices ===
Direct or indirect subsidies of water uses aim mostly at increasing the attractiveness of "green" products, production factors that have limited negative environmental impacts on water resources or produce positive environmental externalities.

== Compensation mechanisms ==
Payments and charges on the deterioration of environmental goods can be substituted by mechanisms where environmental degradation leads to financial payment that is allocated to alternative actions to compensate for the degradation. Compensation can also be provided by third parties, for instance insurances.

=== Payment for ecosystem services ===
Water bodies provide ecosystem services consisting of flood protection, biodiversity support and remediation. These functions are generally not considered as economic benefits, although they are used as inputs for social activities. Introduction of payment schemes can potentially support the maintenance of natural functions of water bodies.

== Evaluating Economic Policy Instruments for Water Policies ==
The EPI-WATER research project funded by the founded by European Commission under the 7th Framework Programme, sets to assess the effectiveness and the efficiency of Economic Policy Instruments in achieving water policy goals, and to identify the preconditions under which they complement or perform better than alternative (e.g. regulatory or voluntary) policy instruments. Using a common multi-dimensional assessment framework, the project will compare the performance of single economic instruments or their apposite combinations with the performance otherwise achievable with regulatory (command & control) interventions (such as water restriction/rationing, licensing or permitting), persuasive instruments or voluntary commitments. Furthermore the project will identify remaining research and methodological issues that need to be addressed, in particular with regards to the further development and use of national accounting, for supporting the design, implementation and evaluation of EPI in the field of water management.

The assessment is based on the analysis of case studies on experiences for the implementation of economic policy instruments for water policies throughout European Member states and beyond and on ex post simulation of impacts and environmental outcomes of the application of selected instruments to water policy issues in EU member states. The project is coordinated by Fondazione Eni Enrico Mattei.
