= Water system (disambiguation) =

Water system refers to a water supply network.

Water system may also refer to:

- Domestic or industrial water resources
- Drip irrigation, a type of micro-irrigation system
- Hydroelectricity systems
- Agricultural irrigation infrastructure
- Water balance
- Water distribution system
- Water resources

== See also ==
- Drainage system (disambiguation)
