= Virtual water =

Concept on hidden water in traded commodities

The virtual water trade is the hidden flow of water in food or other commodities that are traded from one place to another. Other terms for it are embedded or embodied water. The virtual water trade is the idea that virtual water is exchanged along with goods and services. This idea provides a new, amplified perspective on water problems. It balances different perspectives, basic conditions, and interests. This concept makes it possible to distinguish between global, regional, and local levels and their linkages. However, the use of virtual water estimates may offer no guidance for policymakers seeking to ensure they are meeting environmental objectives.

For example, cereal grains have been major carriers of virtual water in countries where water resources are scarce. So cereal imports can compensate for local water deficits. However, low-income countries may not be able to afford such imports in the future. This could lead to food insecurity and starvation.

== Concept ==
The virtual water concept, also known as embodied water, was coined by John Anthony Allan (Tony Allan) in 1993. He received the Stockholm Water Prize for the concept in 2008.

The virtual water trade is the idea that when goods and services are exchanged, so is virtual water. When a country imports one tonne of wheat instead of producing it domestically, it is saving about 1,300 cubic meters of real indigenous water. If this country is water-scarce, the water that is 'saved' can be used towards other ends. If the exporting country is water-scarce, however, it has exported 1,300 cubic meters of virtual water since the real water used to grow the wheat will no longer be available for other purposes. This has obvious strategic implications for countries that are water-constrained such as those found in the Southern African Development Community (SADC) area.

Water-scarce countries like Israel discourage the export of oranges (relatively water intensive crops) precisely to prevent large quantities of water from being exported to different parts of the world.

In recent years, the concept of virtual water trade has gained weight both in the scientific as well as in the political debate. The notion of the concept is ambiguous. It changes between an analytical, descriptive concept and a political induced strategy. As an analytical concept, virtual water trade represents an instrument that allows the identification and assessment of policy options not only in the scientific but also in the political discourse. As a politically induced strategy, the question if virtual water trade can be implemented in a sustainable way, whether the implementation can be managed in a social, economical, and ecological fashion, and for which countries the concept offers a meaningful option.

The data that underlie the concept of virtual water can readily be used to construct water satellite accounts, and brought into economic models of international trade such as the GTAP Computable General Equilibrium Model. Such a model can be used to study the economic implications of changes in the water supply or water policy, as well as the water resource implications of economic development and trade liberalization.

In sum, virtual water trade allows a new, amplified perspective on water problems: In the framework of recent developments from a supply-oriented to demand-oriented management of water resources, it opens up new fields of governance and facilitates differentiation and balancing of different perspectives, basic conditions, and interests. Analytically, the concept enables one to distinguish between global, regional, and local levels and their linkages. This means, that water resource problems have to be solved in problems if they cannot be successfully addressed in the local or regional watershed. Virtual water trade can thus overcome the hydro-centricity of a narrow watershed view. According to the proceedings of a 2006 conference in Frankfurt, Germany, it seems reasonable to link the new concept with the approach of integrated water resources management.

== Related terms ==
=== Water footprint ===
The concept of virtual water trade was introduced to refer to the idea that countries can save domestic water by importing food. Imported food, however, comes from somewhere. In 2002, Arjen Y. Hoekstra, while working for UNESCO-IHE, introduced the concept of water footprint. The water footprint shows the link between consumer goods or a consumption pattern and water use and pollution. Virtual water trade and water footprint can be seen as part of a bigger story: the globalization of water.

For instance, it takes 1,340 cubic meters of water (based on the world average) to produce one tonne of wheat. The precise volume can be more or less depending on climatic conditions and agricultural practice. Hoekstra has defined the virtual-water content of a product (a commodity, good or service) as "the volume of freshwater used to produce the product, measured at the place where the product was actually produced". It refers to the sum of the water use in the various steps of the production chain.

=== Embodied energy ===
Some researchers have attempted to use the methods of energy analysis, which aim to produce embodied energy estimates, to derive virtual, or embodied water estimates.

== Virtual water content of selected products ==
The following table shows the average virtual water content of some selected products for a number of selected countries (m^{3}/ton):

Product	USA	China	India	Russia	Indonesia	Australia	Brazil	Japan	Mexico	Italy	Netherlands	World average
Rice (paddy)	1,275	1,321	2,850	2,401	2,150	1,022	3,082	1,221	2,182	1,679		2,291
Rice (husked)	1,656	1,716	3,702	3,118	2,793	1,327	4,003	1,586	2,834	2,180		2,975
Rice (broken)	1,903	1,972	4,254	3,584	3,209	1,525	4,600	1,822	3,257	2,506		3,419
Wheat	849	690	1,654	2,375		1,588	1,616	734	1,066	2,421	619	1,334
Maize	489	801	1,937	1,397	1,285	744	1,180	1,493	1,744	530	408	909
Soybeans	1,869	2,617	4,124	3,933	2,030	2,106	1,076	2,326	3,177	1,506		1,789
Sugar cane	103	117	159		164	141	155	120	171			175
Cotton seed	2,535	1,419	8,264		4,453	1,887	2,777		2,127			3,644
Cotton lint	5,733	3,210	18,694		10,072	4,268	6,281		4,812			8,242
Barley	702	848	1,966	2,359		1,425	1,373	697	2,120	1,822	718	1,388
Sorghum	782	863	4,053						1,212	582		2,853
Coconuts		749	2,255						1,954			2,545
Millet	2,143	1,863	3,269						4,534			4,596
Coffee (green)	4,864	6,290	12,180						28,119			17,373
Coffee (roasted)	5,790	7,488	14,500						33,475			20,682
Tea (made)		11,110	7,002									9,205
Beef	13,193	12,560	16,482						37,762	21,167	11,681	15,497
Pork	3,946	2,211	4,397						6,559	6,377	3,790	4,856
Goat meat	3,082	3,994	5,187						10,252	4,180	2,791	4,043
Sheep meat	5,977	5,202	6,692						16,878	7,572	5,298	6,143
Chicken meat	2,389	3,652	7,736						5,013	2,198	2,222	3,918
Eggs	1,510	3,550	7,531						4,277	1,389	1,404	3,340
Milk	695	1,000	1,369	1,345	1,143	915	1,001	812	2,382	861	641	990
Milk powder	3,234	4,648	6,368	6,253	5,317	4,255	4,654	3,774	11,077	4,005	2,982	4,602
Cheese	3,457	4,963	6,793	6,671	5,675	4,544	4,969	4,032	11,805	4,278	3,190	4,914
Leather (bovine)	14,190	13,513	17,710	22,575	15,929	18,384	18,222	11,864	40,482	22,724	12,572	16,656

== Limitations ==
The virtual water or the water footprint concepts have faced some criticism. Australia's National Water Commission considers that the measurement of virtual water has little practical value in decision making regarding the best allocation of scarce water resources.

Other limitations more specific to the MENA (the Middle East & North Africa) region include the fact that importing food could pose the risk of further political dependence. The notion of "self-sufficiency" has always been the pride of the MENA region.

== See also ==
- Peak water
- Water footprint
- Water management
- Deficit irrigation
- Water resource policy
