= John Anthony Allan =

British geographer (1937–2021)

John Anthony Allan (27 January 1937 – 15 April 2021), sometime cited as Tony Allan, was a British geographer. He was awarded the Stockholm Water Prize in 2008 for his revolutionary virtual water concept. Although being an emeritus of the School of Oriental and African Studies and King's College London of the University of London, he still acted as a teaching Professor at King's College London.

== Education ==
Allan studied at Durham University from 1955 to 1958, graduating with a first-class B.A. in Geography. He commenced doctoral studies in 1966 at the School of Oriental and African Studies in London, completing a PhD on water management in Libya in 1971.

== Research ==
Having been a long time water analyst with emphasis on the Middle East, he coined the term virtual water in 1993 after having been inspired by Gideon Fishelson from Tel Aviv University, who criticised his government over the amount of water that had been used to produce and export citrus fruits to the European Union. Allan then researched trade figures of Middle Eastern states to conclude that this water-scarce region was only able to survive through large quantities of food imports in grain, livestock etc. Thus, the region was not dependent on its own scarce water resources but could purchase water already embedded in agricultural produce. It was this logic that enabled Tony Allan to challenge the then prevailing thesis that the wars in the next century will be fought over water. In essence he explained how the importation of water embedded mostly in cereals into water-scarce regions of the world via trade explained why wars over water were both unnecessary and unlikely. This opened up a plethora of new research directions for his many graduate students working in water constrained parts of the world. His seminal work entitled The Middle East Water Question: Hydropolitics and the Global Economy captured a lifetime of research and has become a cornerstone for policy-makers and researchers. A significant contribution to this paradigm shift has been the emergence of the concept of benefit-sharing as opposed to water-sharing, or the management of transboundary waters as a public good.

== Stockholm Water Prize ==
In March 2008, Allan was announced to receive the Stockholm Water Prize, which is the equivalent to an environmental Nobel Prize according to some commentators. The international nominated Allan for it due to 'his unique, pioneering and long lasting work in education and raising the awareness internationally of the interdisciplinary relationships between agricultural production, water use, economies and political processes'.
