= 3 Quarks Daily =

Online news aggregator and blog

- Website type: Literature, the arts, politics, current affairs, science, philosophy
- Available in: English
- Editors: S. Abbas Raza Founding Editor; Morgan Meis; Robin Varghese; Azra Raza; Sughra Raza; Jim Culleny Poetry Editor; Zujaja Tauqeer Associate Editor
- Website: 3quarksdaily.com
- Users: 400,000 per month
- Launched: 2004; 22 years ago
- Current status: Online

3 Quarks Daily is an online news aggregator and blog that curates commentary, essays, and multimedia from selected periodicals, newspapers, journals, and blogs. The focus is on literature, the arts, politics, current affairs, science, philosophy, gossip—and, as stated on their web site—"anything else we deem inherently fascinating." Each day of the week from Tuesday through Sunday features about a dozen items culled from the World Wide Web. Each Monday is devoted to an online magazine which has essays and other previously unpublished content by editors and guest columnists. The stated aim of 3QD is to offer "a one-stop intellectual surfing experience by culling good stuff from all over and putting it in one place."

3 Quarks Daily also awards annual prizes, called "quarks", for exceptional writing in the blogosphere, as well as organizing quarterly online symposia on international issues. The blog commands a significant readership and readers follow it in a variety of ways: through an email subscription and an RSS feed, as well as through social media updates via Twitter and Facebook.

== History ==
Author, engineer, and philosopher S. Abbas Raza founded 3 Quarks Daily in 2004 to serve as a conduit for content across disciplines for the web-based intellectual everyman. Unlike similar blogs of the time, such as Arts & Letters Daily and Andrew Sullivan's The Daily Dish, 3QD would explore topics beyond the humanities and feature science content as well as commentary on current events. In fact, Abbas Raza says that Arts & Letters Daily, "was one of the main inspirations for my starting 3 Quarks Daily." The first post was on Saturday, July 31, 2004, and featured the 1904 Constantine Cavafy poem Waiting for the Barbarians.

The new aggregator site grew rapidly, reaching a thousand posts within seven months; by 2014 that number had reached thirty-five thousand. Since then, 3 Quarks Daily has culled content from hundreds of sources, from blogs such as Salon, Science Daily, and The Huffington Post, from major publications such as The New York Times, Nature, and The Guardian, to smaller outlets such as Guernica Magazine, The Awl, and The American Scholar.

The name 3 Quarks Daily comes from the elementary nuclear particles of physics which in turn were named after the word quark which James Joyce had used in Finnegans Wake. The confluence of references to both science and literature in a single word suited the intent of the blog perfectly and the founders also thought that the name would be short and memorable. They named their top three annual prizes the Top Quark (1st), the Strange Quark (2nd), and the Charm Quark (3rd).

== The DAG-3QD Peace And Justice Symposia ==
Since 2012 3 Quarks Daily has teamed up with the Amsterdam-based Dialogue Advisory Group (DAG) to present online dialogues on topics of international peace and justice. Occasionally, as in the 2013 symposium on drones, a book is published. As of October 2015 there have been six such symposia as shown below.

Peace And Justice Symposia
date	topic
February 25, 2014	What is the Future for Colombia's Rebels?
September 16, 2013	The Elusive Quest for Political Stability in Central Asia and Beyond
July 1, 2013	The Iraq War and Democracy in the Middle East
February 25, 2013	The Vexing Complexities of Drones
November 26, 2012	The Role of Gender in Situations of War and Conflict
September 3, 2012	Evaluating the Responsibility to Protect (R2P) Doctrine

== The Quark Prizes ==
In 2009, in the interest of encouraging and rewarding good writing in the blogosphere, 3QD announced that it would be awarding annual cash prizes, in Science, Arts & Literature, Politics, and Philosophy for the three best blog posts in each of these four fields. The selection process is as follows: After several weeks during which nominees are submitted by 3QD readers and editors, the four principal editors of 3QD (Abbas Raza, Robin Varghese, Morgan Meis, and Azra Raza) narrow the list down to six articles in each category. A prominent intellectual such as Steven Pinker, Richard Dawkins, or Lewis Lapham is chosen in each of the four areas to select the final winners. The prizes are whimsically named the Top Quark (first prize of $500), the Strange Quark (second prize of $200), and the Charm Quark (third prize of $100). Originally the prize amounts were twice as big. Not every prize is awarded every year, and no prizes at all were awarded in 2013.

Due to logistical and financial reasons, the Quark Prizes were discontinued after 2015. A complete list of prizes awarded between 2009 and 2015 is shown below.

Philosophy Prizes
prize	winner	winning work
2015 Philosophy Prizes — judged by John Collins
1	Vidar Halgunset	Slow Corruption
2	Daniel Silvermint	On How We Talk About Passing
3	Lisa Herzog	(One of) Effective Altruism’s blind spot(s)
2014 Philosophy Prizes — judged by Huw Price
1	Grace Boey	Is applied ethics applicable enough? Acting and hedging under moral uncertainty
2	Ryan Simonelli	Nāgārjuna, Nietzsche, and Rorty’s Strange Looping Trick
3	Marcus Arvan	The Case for Libertarian Compatibilism
2012 Philosophy Prizes — judged by Justin E. H. Smith
1	Wesley Buckwalter	Factive Verbs and Protagonist Projection
2	Elizabeth Anderson	Recharting the Map of Social and Political Theory: Where is Government? Where is Conservatism?
3	Thomas Rodham	Democracy is not a truth machine
2011 Philosophy Prizes — judged by Patricia Churchland
1	Terrence Tomkow	Self Defense
2	John Schwenkler	Has Molyneux's Question Been Answered?
3	Jussi Suikkanen	Williams, Thick Concepts, and Reasons
2010 Philosophy Prizes — judged by Akeel Bilgrami
1	Justin Erik Halldor Smith	More on Non-Western Philosophy (the Very Idea)
2	Terrance Tomkow	The Retributive Theory of Property
3	Brian Leiter	Katsafanas on "Nietzsche's Philosophical Psychology
2009 Philosophy Prizes — judged by Daniel C. Dennett
1	Terrance Tomkow	Blackburn, Truth and other Hot Topics
2	David Shoemaker	Scanlon on Moral Responsibility and Blame
3	Gerald Dworkin	Penne For Your Thought

Science Prizes
prize	winner	winning work
2015 Science Prizes — judged by Nick Lane
1	Ashutosh Jogalekar	The fundamental philosophical dilemma of chemistry
2	Aatish Bhatia	The Sound So Loud That It Circled the Earth Four Times
3	Nadia Drake	When Hubble Stared at Nothing for 100 Hours
2014 Science Prizes — judged by Frans B. M. de Waal
1	Eric Michael Johnson	Promiscuity Is Pragmatic
2	Christie Wilcox	Did Allergies Evolve To Save Your Life?
3	Carl Zimmer	The Wisdom of (Little) Crowds
2012 Science Prizes — judged by Sean M. Carroll
1	Aatish Bhatia	The crayola-fication of the world: How we gave colors names, and it messed with our brains
2	Cosma Shalizi	In Soviet Union, Optimization Problem Solves You
3	Holly Dunsworth	Forget bipedalism. What about babyism?
2011 Science Prizes — judged by Lisa Randall
1	Bethany Brookshire	Serotonin and Sexual Preference: Is It Really That Simple?
2	Anne Jefferson	Levees and the Illusion of Flood Control
3	Sean M. Carroll	The Fine Structure Constant is Probably Constant
3	Ethan Siegel	Where Is Everybody?
2010 Science Prizes — judged by Richard Dawkins
1	Ed Yong	Gut bacteria in Japanese people borrowed digesting genes from ocean bacteria
2	Carl Zimmer	Skullcaps and Genomes
3	Margaret Morgan	The Evolution of Chloroplasts
2009 Science Prizes — judged by Steven Pinker
1	Adam Lee	Bands of Iron
2	David Shiffman	The ecological disaster that is dolphin safe tuna
3	Phil Plait	Ten Things You Don't Know About Hubble

Arts & Literature Prizes
prize	winner	winning work
2015 Arts & Literature Prizes — judged by Jonathan Kramnick
1	Joanna Walsh	Ventimiglia
2	David Kurnick	The Essential Gratuitousness of César Aira
3	Sarah Blackwood	Editing as Carework
2014 Arts & Literature Prizes — judged by Mohsin Hamid
1	Ali Eteraz	The Death of the Urdu Script
2	Olga Tokarczuk	Everywhere and Nowhere
3	Matthew Jakubowski	Honest work: an experimental review of an experimental translation
2012 Arts & Literature Prizes — judged by Gish Jen
1	Melissa Fisher	My First Job
2	Leanne Ogasawara	Leonardo in the Gilded Age
3	Syed Haider Shahbazd	The Last Novel
2011 Arts & Literature Prizes — judged by Laila Lalami
1	Namit Arora	Joothan: A Dalit's Life
2	Edan Lepucki	Reading and Race: On Slavery in Fiction
3	Elliot Colla	The Poetry of Revolt
2010 Arts & Literature Prizes — judged by Robert Pinsky
1	Tomasz Rozycki	Scorched Maps
2	Amitava Kumar	Postmortem
3	Lydia Kiesling	Proust's Arabesk: The Museum of Innocence by Orhan

Politics and Social Science Prizes
prize	winner	winning work
2015 Politics and Social Science Prizes — judged by Ken Roth
1	Kenan Malik	Assimilation vs. Multiculturism
2	Xavier Marquez	The Saudi Monarchy as a Family Firm
3	Omar Ali	Blasphemy, blasphemy laws, Pakistan, Charlie Hebdo...
2014 Politics and Social Science Prizes — judged by Mark Blyth
1	Kenan Malik	In Defense of Diversity
2	Filipe Gracio	Democratic Austerity: Semi-sovereign states, semi-sovereign peoples
3	Philip Cohen	State of Utah falsely claims same-sex marriage ban makes married, man-woman parenting more likely
2011 Politics and Social Science Prizes — judged by Stephen M. Walt
1	Kenan Malik	Rethinking the Idea of "Christian Europe"
2	David Graeber	On the Invention of Money
3	Corey Robin	Revolutionaries of the Right: The Deep Roots of Conservative Radicalism
2010 Politics Prizes — judged by Lewis H. Lapham
1	Stephen Walt	Why America is going to regret the Cordoba House controversy
2	Dan Froomkin	The Two Most Essential, Abhorrent, Intolerable Lies Of George W. Bush's Memoir
3	Thomas Wells	Politics: Can't Someone Else Do It?
2009 Politics Prizes — judged by Tariq Ali
1	Glenn Greenwald	Greg Craig and Obama's worsening civil liberties record
2	Glen Ford	The Great Black Hajj of 2009
3	Roger Gathman	Republican Virtue and Equality

== Reception ==
The 3 Quarks Daily blog has been praised by prominent authors and scientists including Richard Dawkins, Christopher Lydon, Steven Pinker, Daniel Dennett, Andrew Sullivan, Ken Roth, Laura Claridge, John Allen Paulos, and Thomas Manuel.

== Guest columnists ==
The Monday magazine is not completely the creation of the 3QD editors; guest columnists are frequently invited. Prominent guest contributors have included:

- Marko Ahtisaari
- Arjun Appadurai
- Stephen T. Asma
- Hartosh Singh Bal
- Pranab Bardhan
- Akeel Bilgrami
- Mark Blyth
- Maarten Boudry
- Paul Braterman
- Alexander Cooley
- Gerald Dworkin
- Jennifer Cody Epstein
- Julia Galef
- Mohsin Hamid
- Shadab Zeest Hashmi
- Pervez Hoodbhoy
- Allen M. Hornblum
- Sue Hubbard
- Ahmed Humayun
- Tasneem Zehra Husain
- Sam Kean
- Amitava Kumar
- Laila Lalami
- Kenan Malik
- Suketu Mehta
- Martha Nussbaum
- John Allen Paulos
- Robert Pinsky
- Steven Poole
- Huw Price
- Asad Raza
- Bruce Robbins
- Andrea Scrima
- Bapsi Sidhwa
- Justin E. H. Smith
- Terese Svoboda
- Robert B. Talisse
- Bilal Tanweer
- Frans De Waal
