= List of edible invasive species =

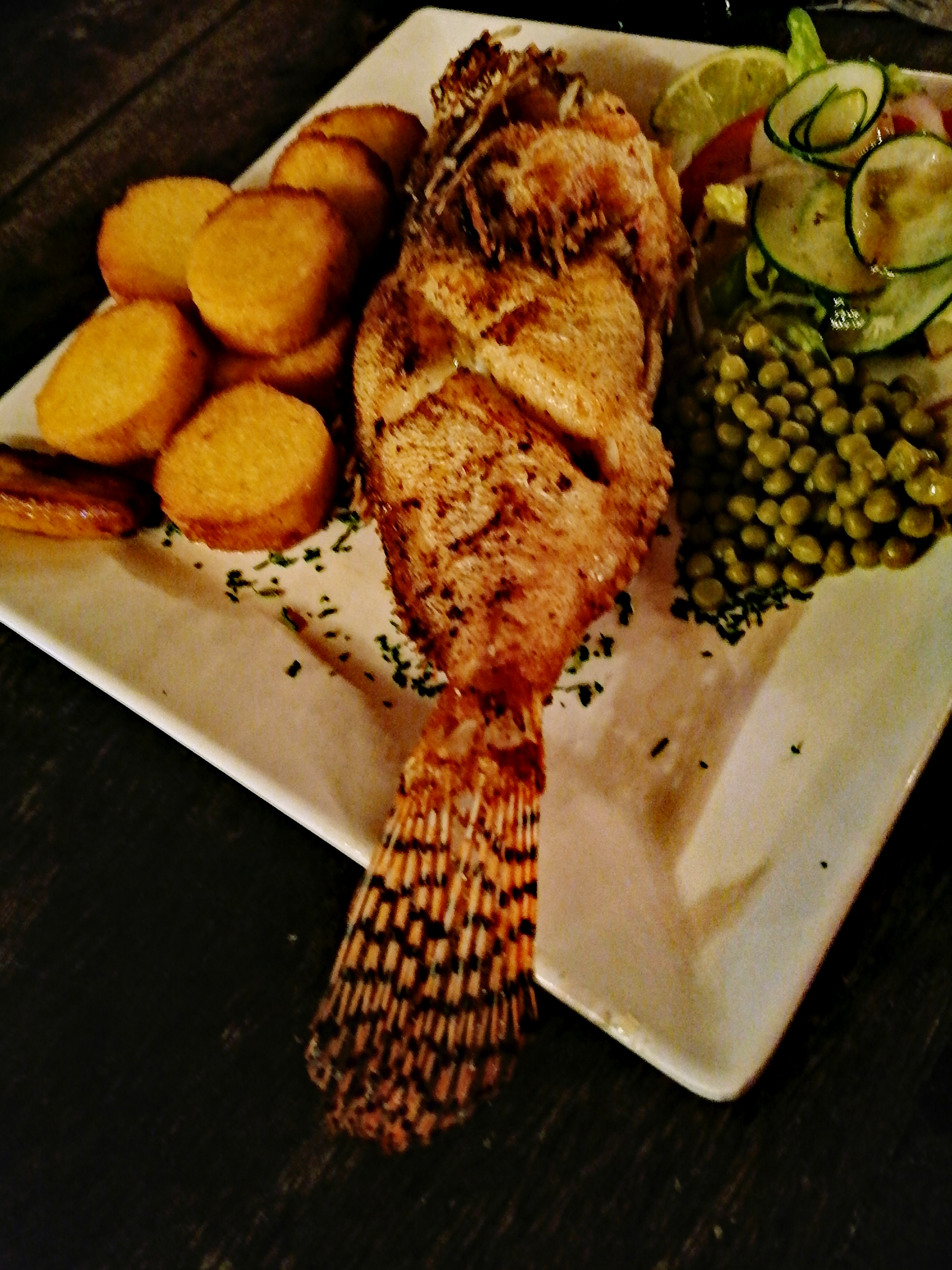
In 2010, the National Oceanic and Atmospheric Administration campaigned for people to "eat lionfish" to counter their introduction to the Caribbean.

Eating invasive species has been suggested by people such as ecologist Joe Roman as a way of reducing their numbers. This is a list of cases where this has been suggested, tried and is now established.

== Plants ==
- Armenian blackberry (Rubus armeniacus).
- Autumn olive (Elaeagnus umbellata), invasive to central and northeastern United States, and Europe.
- Burdock (Arctium spp.) - was introduced to Europe, leaves, flowers and roots are edible.
- Dandelion (Taraxacum spp.)
- Evergreen blackberry (Rubus laciniatus), invasive in the United States, Canada and Australia. The fruit is edible.
- Fennel (Foeniculum vulgare), invasive in the United States and Australia. The bulb, foliage, flowers and fruits are edible.
- Garlic mustard (Alliaria petiolata), invasive in North America.
- Jackfruit (Artocarpus heterophyllus), invasive to Brazil.
- Japanese knotweed (Reynoutria japonica spp.) - was introduced to the United States and Europe from East Asia, shoots are edible and the roots are used for medicinal purposes.
- Kudzu (Pueraria spp.)
- Mugwort (Artemisia vulgaris), invasive in the United States and Canada. The leaves are edible.
- Palmer's amaranth (Amaranthus palmeri)
- Prickly pear cactus, invasive in Australia, Ethiopia, South Africa, and Hawaii. The fruit and pads are edible.
- Water caltrop (Trapa spp.).
- Water hyacinth (Eichhornia crassipes), introduced in North America, Europe, Asia, Australia, Africa, and New Zealand; invasive in many of these areas.
- Watercress (Nasturtium officinale), invasive in North America. The leaves, stems, and fruit can be eaten raw or cooked.
- Wild parsnip (Pastinaca sativa).
- Wintercress (Barbarea vulgaris spp.) - invasive, leaves are edible.

== Animals ==
- American bullfrog (Lithobates catesbeianus)
- Asian carp
- Brook trout (Salvelinus fontinalis)
- Brown trout (Salmo trutta)
- Rainbow trout (Oncorhynchus mykiss)
- Cane toad (Rhinella marina)
- Green shore crab (Carcinus maenas)
- Chinese mitten crab (Eriocheir sinensis)
- Common carp (Cyprinus carpio)
- Eastern grey squirrel (Sciurus carolinensis)
- Eurasian ruffe (Gymnocephalus cernua)
- Domestic pig (Sus scrofa domesticus)
- Domestic rabbit (Oryctolagus cuniculus domesticus)
- Goat (Capra aegagrus hircus)
- Giant Snakehead (Channa micropeltes)
- Nutria (Myocastor coypus)
- Green iguana (Iguana iguana)
- Largemouth bass (Micropterus salmoides)
- Marbled crayfish (Procambarus virginalis)
- Signal crayfish (Pacifastacus leniusculus)
- Mediterranean mussel (Mytilus galloprovincialis)
- Mozambique tilapia (Oreochromis mossambicus)
- Nile perch (Lates niloticus)
- Lionfish (Pterois spp.)
- Walking catfish (Clarias batrachus)
- Snails

== See also ==
- Lists of invasive species
