= Problem-based learning =

Learner-centric pedagogy

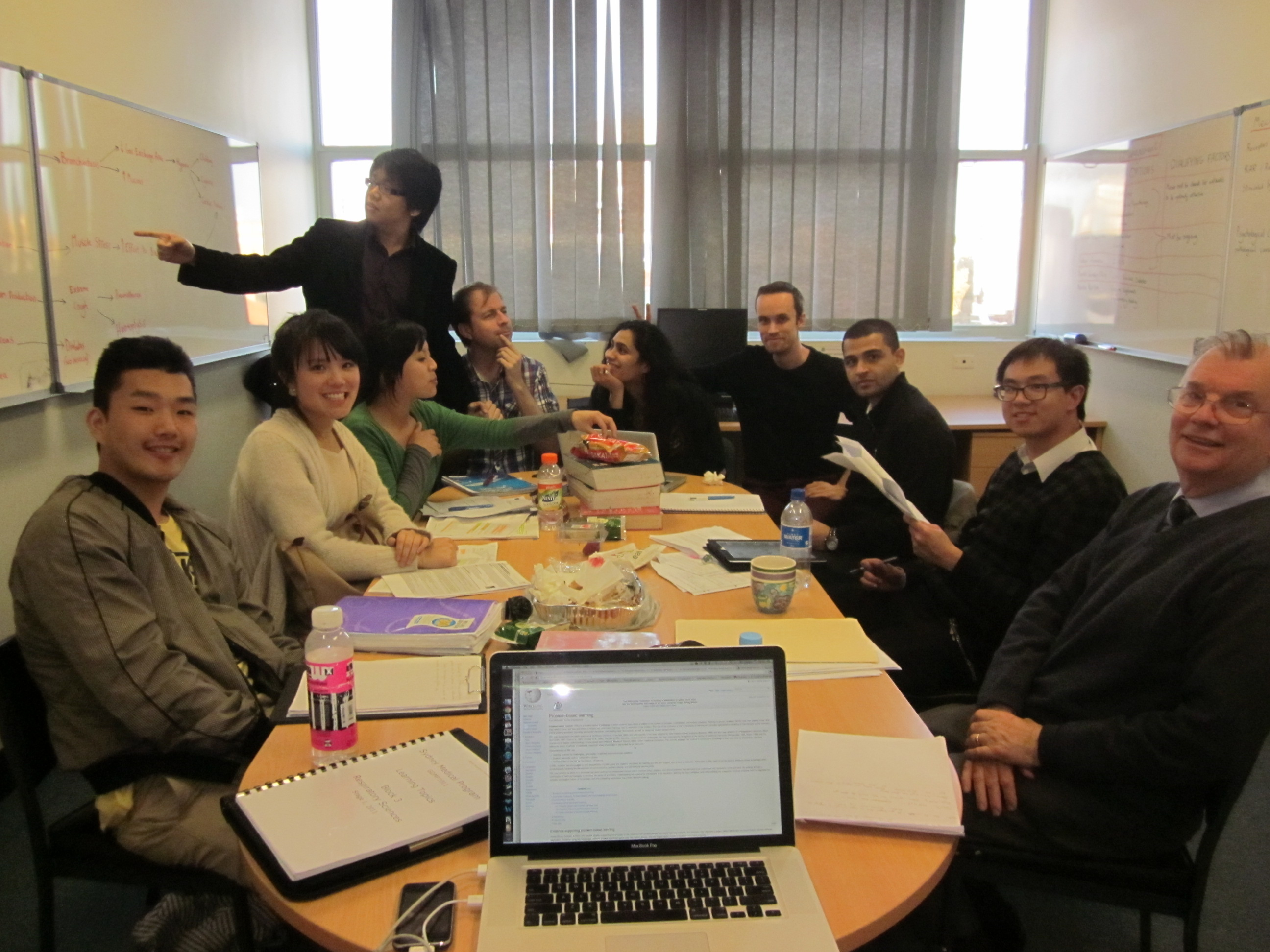
A PBL group at Sydney Dental Hospital

Problem-based learning (PBL) is a teaching method in which students aim to learn about a subject through the experience of solving an open-ended problem found in trigger material. The PBL process does not focus on problem solving with a defined solution, but is designed for the development of other skills and attributes. This includes knowledge acquisition, enhanced group collaboration and communication.

The PBL process was developed for medical education and has since been used for other programs of learning. The process aims to allow for learners to develop skills used for their future practice.

The PBL tutorial process often involves working in small groups of learners. Each student takes on a role within the group that may be formal or informal and the role often alternates. It is focused on the student's reflection and reasoning to construct their own learning.

The Maastricht seven-jump process involves clarifying terms, defining problem(s), brainstorming, structuring and hypothesis, learning objectives, independent study and synthesising. In short, it is identifying what they already know, what they need to know, and how and where to access new information that may lead to the resolution of the problem.

The role of the tutor within the process is to facilitate learning by supporting, guiding, and monitoring the learning process. The tutor aims to build the confidence of a student to address problems, while also expanding their understanding. This process is based on constructivism. PBL has been described as a paradigm shift from traditional teaching and learning philosophy, which is more often lecture-based.

The constructs for teaching PBL may be different from traditional classroom or lecture teaching in a lecture style.

== Meaning ==
Wood (2003) defines problem-based learning as a process that uses identified issues within a scenario to increase knowledge and understanding. The principles of this process are listed below:

1. Learner-driven self-identified goals and outcomes
2. Students do independent, self-directed study before returning to larger group
3. Learning is done in small groups of 8–10 people, with a tutor to facilitate discussion
4. Trigger materials such as paper-based clinical scenarios, lab data, photographs, articles or videos or patients (real or simulated) can be used
5. The Maastricht 7-jump process helps to guide the PBL tutorial process
6. Based on principles of adult learning theory
7. All members of the group have a role to play
8. Allows for knowledge acquisition through combined work and intellect
9. Enhances teamwork and communication, problem-solving and encourages independent responsibility for shared learning - all essential skills for future practice
10. Anyone can do it as long it is right depending on the given causes and scenario

The Maastricht 7-jump involves seven steps, which are:

1. discuss the case and make sure everyone understands the problem
2. identify the questions that need to be answered to shed light on the case
3. brainstorm what the group already knows and identify potential solutions
4. analyse and structure the results of the brainstorming session
5. formulate learning objectives for the knowledge that is still lacking
6. do independent study, individually or in smaller groups: read articles or books, follow practicals or attend lectures to gain the required knowledge
7. discuss the findings

== History ==
The PBL process was pioneered by Barrows and Tamblyn at the medical school program at McMaster University in Hamilton in the 1960s. Traditional medical education disenchanted students, who perceived the vast amount of material presented in the first three years of medical school as having little relevance to the practice of medicine and clinically based medicine. The PBL curriculum was developed in order to try to stimulate learning by allowing students to see the relevance and application to future roles. It has been described as aiming to maintain a higher level of motivation towards learning, and show the importance of responsible, professional attitudes with teamwork values. The approach focuses on driving interest by allowing for selection of problems that have real-world application.

Problem-based learning has subsequently been adopted by other medical school programs adapted for undergraduate instruction, as well as K-12. The use of PBL has expanded from its initial introduction into medical school programs to include education in the areas of other health sciences, math, law, education, economics, business, social studies, and engineering. PBL approaches problems through a method that allows them to be solved in many different ways depending on the initial identification of the problem and may have more than one solution.

In 1974, Aalborg University was funded in Denmark and all the programs (engineering, natural and social sciences) were based on PBL. The UNESCO Chair in Problem-Based Learning in Engineering Education is at Aalborg University. Currently its roughly 20,000 students still follow PBL principles.

== Advantages ==
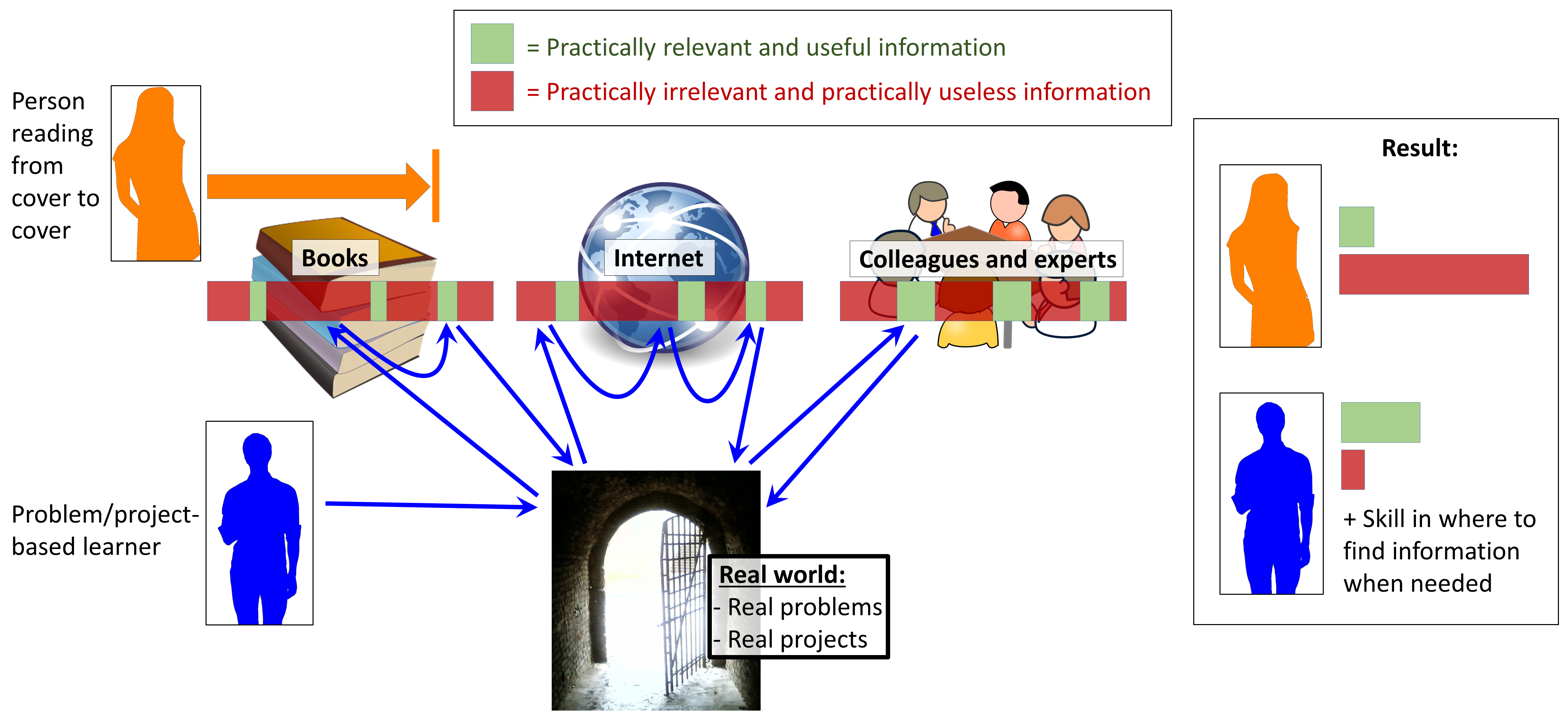
Example of problem/project based learning versus reading cover to cover. The problem/project-based learner may memorize a smaller amount of total information due to spending time searching for the optimal material across various sources, but will likely learn more useful items for real world scenarios, and will likely be better at knowing where to find information when needed.

There are advantages of PBL. It is student-focused, which allows for active learning and better understanding and retention of knowledge. It also helps to develop life skills that are applicable to many domains. It can be used to enhance content knowledge while simultaneously fostering the development of communication, problem-solving, critical thinking, collaboration, and self-directed learning skills. PBL may position students to optimally function using real-world experiences. By harnessing collective group intellect, differing perspectives may offer different perceptions and solutions to a problem. Following are the advantages and limitations of problem-based learning.

=== Enhance student-centred learning ===
In problem-based learning the students are actively involved and they like this method. It fosters active learning, and also retention and development of lifelong learning skills. It encourages self-directed learning by confronting students with problems and stimulates the development of deep learning.

=== Upholds lifelong learning ===
Problem-based learning gives emphasis to lifelong learning by developing in students the potential to determine their own goals, locate appropriate resources for learning and assume responsibility for what they need to know. It also greatly helps them better long term knowledge retention.

=== Prominence on comprehension not facts ===
Problem-based learning focuses on engaging students in finding solutions to real life situations and pertinent contextualized problems. In this method discussion forums collaborative research take the place of lecturing.

=== In-depth learning and constructivist approach ===
PBL fosters learning by involving students with the interaction of learning materials. They relate the concept they study with everyday activities and enhance their knowledge and understanding. Students also activate their prior knowledge and build on existing conceptual knowledge frameworks.

=== Augments self-learning ===
Students themselves resolve the problems that are given to them, they take more interest and responsibility for their learning. They themselves will look for resources like research articles, journals, web materials, text books etc. for their purpose. Thus it equips them with more proficiency in seeking resources in comparison to the students of traditional learning methods.

=== Better understanding and adeptness ===
By giving more significance to the meaning, applicability and relevance to the learning materials it leads to better understanding of the subjects learnt. When students are given more challenging and significant problems it makes them more proficient. The real life contexts and problems makes their learning more profound, lasting and also enhances the transferability of skills and knowledge from the classroom to work. Since there is more scope for application of knowledge and skills the transferability is increased. It will be also very helpful to them not only to visualise what it will be like applying that knowledge and expertise on their field of work or profession.

=== Reinforces interpersonal skills and teamwork ===
Project based learning is more of teamwork and collaborative learning. The teams or groups resolve relevant problems in collaboration and hence it fosters student interaction, teamwork and reinforces interpersonal skills. like peer evaluation, working with group dynamic etc. It also fosters in them the leadership qualities, learn to make decision by consensus and give constructive feed back to the team members etc.

=== Self-motivated attitude ===
Researchers say that students like problem-based learning classes rather than the traditional classes. The increase in the percentage of attendance of students and their attitude towards this approach itself makes it very clear that they are self-motivated. In fact it is more fascinating, stimulating and one of the good learning methods because it is more flexible and interesting to students. They enjoy this environment of learning for it is less threatening and they can learn independently. All these aspects make students more self-motivated and they pursue learning even after they leave the school or college.

=== Enriches the teacher-student relationship ===
Since the students are self-motivated, good teamwork, self-directed learning etc. the teachers who have worked in both traditional and project based learning formats prefer project based learning. They also feel that problem-based learning is more nurturing, significant curriculum and beneficial to the cognitive growth of the student.

=== Higher level of learning ===
The PBL students score higher than the students in traditional courses because of their learning competencies, problem solving, self-assessment techniques, data gathering, behavioral science etc. It is because they are better at activating prior knowledge, and they learn in a context resembling their future context and elaborate more on the information presented which helps in better understanding and retention of knowledge. In medical education, PBL cases can incorporate dialogue between patients and physicians, demonstrate the narrative character of the medical encounter, and examine the political economic contributors to disease production. PBL can serve as a platform for a discursive practices approach to culture that emphasizes the emergent, participant-constructed qualities of social phenomena while also acknowledging large-scale social forces.

== Disadvantages ==
According to Wood (2003), the major disadvantage to this process involves the utilization of resources and tutor facilitation. It requires more staff to take an active role in facilitation and group-led discussion and some educators find PBL facilitation difficult and frustrating. It is resource-intensive because it requires more physical space and more accessible computer resources to accommodate simultaneous smaller group-learning. Students also report uncertainty with information overload and are unable to determine how much study is required and the relevance of information available. Students may not have access to teachers who serve as the inspirational role models that traditional curriculum offers.

=== Time-consuming ===
Although students generally like and gain greater ability to solve real-life problems in problem-based learning courses, instructors of the methodology must often invest more time to assess student learning and prepare course materials, as compared to LBL instructors. Part of this frustration also stems from the amount of time dedicated to presenting new research and individual student findings regarding each specific topic, as well as the disorganised nature of brain-storming

=== Traditional assumptions of the students ===
The problem of the problem-based learning is the traditional assumptions of the students. Most of the students might have spent their previous years of education assuming their teacher as the main disseminator of knowledge. Because of this understanding towards the subject matter students may lack the ability to simply wonder about something in the initial years of problem-based learning.

=== Role of the instructor ===
The instructors have to change their traditional teaching methodologies in order to incorporate problem-based learning. Their task is to question students' knowledge, beliefs, give only hints to correct their mistakes and guide the students in their research. All these features of problem-based learning may be foreign to some instructors; hence they find it difficult to alter their past habits.

=== Pupil's evaluation ===
The instructors have to adapt new assessment methods to evaluate the pupils' achievement. They have to incorporate written examinations with modified essay questions, practical examinations, peer and self assessments etc. Problem-based has also been considered slightly more favourable to female participants, whilst having equivocal impacts on their male counterparts when compared to lecture based learning.

=== Cognitive load ===
Sweller and others published a series of studies over the past twenty years that is relevant to problem-based learning, concerning cognitive load and what they describe as the guidance-fading effect. Sweller et al. conducted several classroom-based studies with students studying algebra problems. These studies have shown that active problem solving early in the learning process is a less effective instructional strategy than studying worked examples (Sweller and Cooper, 1985; Cooper and Sweller, 1987). Certainly active problem solving is useful as learners become more competent, and better able to deal with their working memory limitations. But early in the learning process, learners may find it difficult to process a large amount of information in a short time. Thus the rigors of active problem solving may become an issue for novices. Once learners gain expertise the scaffolding inherent in problem-based learning helps learners avoid these issues. These studies were conducted largely based on individual problem solving of well-defined problems.

Sweller (1988) proposed cognitive load theory to explain how novices react to problem solving during the early stages of learning. Sweller, et al. suggests a worked example early, and then a gradual introduction of problems to be solved. They propose other forms of learning early in the learning process (worked example, goal free problems, etc.); to later be replaced by completions problems, with the eventual goal of solving problems on their own. This problem-based learning becomes very useful later in the learning process.

Many forms of scaffolding have been implemented in problem-based learning to reduce the cognitive load of learners. These are most useful to enable decreasing ("fading") the amount of guidance during problem solving. A gradual fading of guidance helps learners to slowly transit from studying examples to solving problems. In this case backwards fading was found to be quite effective and assisting in decreasing the cognitive load on learners.

Evaluation of the effects of PBL learning in comparison to traditional instructional learning have proved to be a challenge. Various factors can influence the implementation of PBL: extent of PBL incorporation into curriculum, group dynamics, nature of problems used, facilitator influence on group, and the motivation of the learners. There are also various outcomes of PBL that can be measured including knowledge acquisition and clinical competence. Additional studies are needed to investigate all the variables and technological scaffolds, that may impact the efficacy of PBL.

=== Demands of implementing ===
Implementing PBL in schools and Universities is a demanding process that requires resources, a lot of planning and organization. Azer discusses the 12 steps for implementing the "pure PBL"

1. Prepare faculty for change
2. Establish a new curriculum committee and working group
3. Designing the new PBL curriculum and defining educational outcomes
4. Seeking Advice from Experts in PBL
5. Planning, Organizing and Managing
6. Training PBL facilitators and defining the objectives of a facilitator
7. Introducing Students to the PBL Program
8. Using 3-learning to support the delivery of the PBL program
9. Changing the assessment to suit the PBL curriculum
10. Encouraging feedback from students and teaching staff
11. Managing learning resources and facilities that support self-directed learning
12. Continuing evaluation and making changes (pg. 809–812)

=== Cultural difference: Asia ===
Some of the reported difficulties in implementing PBL in these schools include poor participation and difficulty in getting students involved in discussions, due possibly to their Asian reticence. One school reported that students felt that they were compelled to speak as they were being assessed. Some students reported not having enough confidence to seek information independently without guidance from their teachers. The students also found it very time-consuming to seek information themselves, as they still had to cope with the requirements of the traditional curriculum of attending lectures. Some students had difficulty with the language if the PBL discussions were conducted in English, as it was not their working language.

== Constructivism ==
Problem-based learning addresses the need to promote lifelong learning through the process of inquiry and constructivist learning. PBL is considered a constructivist approach to instruction because it emphasizes collaborative and self-directed learning while being supported by tutor facilitation. Yew and Schmidt, Schmidt, and Hung elaborate on the cognitive constructivist process of PBL:

1. Learners are presented with a problem and through discussion within their group, activate their prior knowledge.
2. Within their group, they develop possible theories or hypotheses to explain the problem. Together they identify learning issues to be researched. They construct a shared primary model to explain the problem at hand. Facilitators provide scaffolding, which is a framework on which students can construct knowledge relating to the problem.
3. After the initial teamwork, students work independently in self-directed study to research the identified issues.
4. The students re-group to discuss their findings and refine their initial explanations based on what they learned.

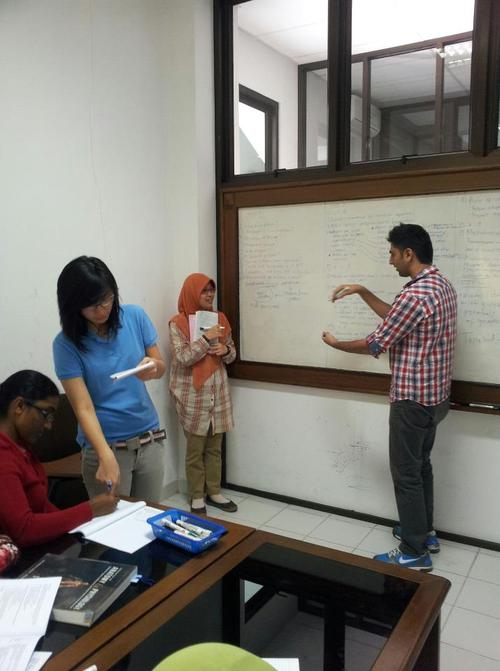
A PBL group at Gadjah Mada University

PBL follows a constructivist perspective in learning as the role of the instructor is to guide and challenge the learning process rather than strictly providing knowledge. From this perspective, feedback and reflection on the learning process and group dynamics are essential components of PBL. Students are considered to be active agents who engage in social knowledge construction. PBL assists in processes of creating meaning and building personal interpretations of the world based on experiences and interactions. PBL assists to guide the student from theory to practice during their journey through solving the problem.

== Supporting evidence ==
Several studies support the success of the constructivist problem-based and inquiry learning methods. One example is a study on a project called GenScope, an inquiry-based science software application, which found that students using the GenScope software showed significant gains over the control groups, with the largest gains shown in students from basic courses.

One large study tracked middle school students' performance on high-stakes standardized tests to evaluate the effectiveness of inquiry-based science. The study found a 14 percent improvement for the first cohort of students and a 13 percent improvement for the second cohort of students. The study also found that inquiry-based teaching methods greatly reduced the achievement gap for African-American students.

A systematic review of the effects of problem-based learning in medical school on the performance of doctors after graduation showed clear positive effects on physician competence. This effect was especially strong for social and cognitive competencies such as coping with uncertainty and communication skills.

Another study from Slovenia looked at whether students who learn with PBL are better at solving problems and if their attitudes towards mathematics were improved compared to their peers in a more traditional curriculum. The study found that students who were exposed to PBL were better at solving more difficult problems; however, there was no significant difference in student attitude towards mathematics.

== Examples in curricula ==
=== Malaysia and Singapore ===
In Malaysia, an attempt was made to introduce a problem-based learning model in secondary mathematics, with the aim of educating citizens to prepare them for decision-making in sustainable and responsible development. This model called Problem-Based Learning the Four Core Areas (PBL4C) first sprouted in SEAMEO RECSAM in 2008, and as a result of training courses conducted, a paper was presented at the EARCOME5 conference in 2010, followed by two papers during the 15th UNESCO-APEID conference in 2011.

In Singapore, the most notable example of adopting PBL pedagogy in curriculum is Republic Polytechnic, the first polytechnic in Singapore to fully adopt PBL across all diploma courses.

=== Medical schools ===
Several medical schools have incorporated problem-based learning into their curricula following the lead of McMaster University Medical School, using real patient cases to teach students how to think like a clinician. More than eighty percent of medical schools in the United States now have some form of problem-based learning in their programs. Research of 10 years of data from the University of Missouri School of Medicine indicates that PBL has a positive effect on the students' competency as physicians after graduation.

In 1998, Western University of Health Sciences opened its College of Veterinary Medicine, with curriculum based completely on PBL.

In 2002, UC Berkeley – UCSF Joint Medical Program (JMP), an accredited five year Master of Science/Medical Doctorate Program housed at University of California, Berkeley School of Public Health, began offering a 100% case based curriculum to their students in their pre-clerkship years. The curriculum integrates the basic and preclinical sciences while fostering an understanding of the biological, social, and moral contexts of human health and disease. The students spend their last two clerkship years at University of California, San Francisco.

=== Ecological economics ===
The transdisciplinary field of ecological economics has embraced problem-based learning as a core pedagogy. A workbook developed by Joshua Farley, Jon Erickson, and Herman Daly organizes the problem-solving process into (1) building the problem base, (2) analyzing the problem, (3) synthesizing the findings, and (4) communicating the results. Building the problem base includes choosing, defining, and structuring an ecological economic problem. Analysis is breaking down of a problem into understandable components. Synthesis is the re-integration of the parts in a way that helps better understand the whole. Communication is the translation of results into a form relevant to stakeholders, broadly defined as the extended peer community. (a concept developed in Post-normal science).

== Other outcomes ==
One of the aims of PBL is the development of self-directed learning (SDL) skills. In Loyens, Magda & Rikers' discussion, SDL is defined as "a process in which individuals take the initiative...in diagnosing their learning needs, formulating goals, identifying human and material resources, choosing and implementing appropriate learning strategies, and evaluating learning outcomes". By being invited into the learning process, students are also invited to take responsibility for their learning, which leads to an increase in self-directed learning skills. In Severiens and Schmidt's study of 305 first year college students, they found that PBL and its focus on SDL led to motivation for students to maintain study pace, led to social and academic integration, encouraged development of cognitive skills, and fostered more study progress than students in a conventional learning setting. PBL encourages learners to take a place in the academic world through inquiring and discovery that is central to problem-based learning.

PBL is also argued as a learning method that can promote the development of critical thinking skills. In PBL learning, students learn how to analyze a problem, identify relevant facts and generate hypotheses, identify necessary information/knowledge for solving the problem and make reasonable judgments about solving the problem.

Employers have appreciated the positive attributes of communication, teamwork, respect and collaboration that PBL experienced students have developed. These skills provide for better future skills preparation in the ever-changing information explosion. PBL curriculum includes building these attributes through knowledge building, written and interpersonal interactions and through the experience of the problem solving process.

== Computer-supported collaborative learning ==
Computer-supported PBL can be an electronic version (ePBL) of the traditional face-to-face paper-based PBL or an online group activity with participants located distant apart. ePBL provides the opportunity to embed audios and videos, related to the skills (e.g. clinical findings) within the case scenarios improving learning environment and thus enhance students' engagement in the learning process. Comparing face-to-face setting with strict online PBL, the group activities play the key role in the success of the social interaction in PBL. Online PBL is also seen as more cost-effective. Collaborative PBL has been shown to improve critical thinking scores as compared with individual PBL, and increased students' achievement levels and retention scores.

For the instructors, instructional design principles for the instructors regarding the design and development of online PBL must include collaborative characteristics. For example, the scheduling must be conducive to collaborative activities. Additionally, instructors should ensure that the problems should be relevant to real-life experiences, and the nature of solutions and problem contexts. Furthermore, a sound technological infrastructure is paramount.

=== History of online PBL ===
The establishment and application of PBL in teaching and training started as early as in the 1960s. As instructional technology developed over time coupled with the emergence of the internet in the mid-1990s, online education became popular gaining huge attention from organizations and institutions. However, the use of PBL in complete online education does not seem as established based on the relatively scarce references available in the literature. In 2001, the University of Southern Queensland (USQ) was one of the first few faculties that utilized a learning management system (LMS) to facilitate collaboration and group problem-solving. The result showed the significant impact of online PBL on the learning outcomes of students in many aspects including enhancing their communication skills, problem-solving skills and ability to work as a team. The most successful feature of the LMS in terms of user rate was the discussion boards where asynchronous communications took place. Technology has advanced for another decade since then and it should help us take online PBL to a greater height as many more activities such as synchronous online meetings have been made readily available today on numerous platforms. The key focus here is to examine how technology can further facilitate the effective use of PBL online by zooming into the learner needs in each phase of PBL.

=== Tools ===
==== Collaborative tools ====
The first, and possibly most crucial phase in PBL, is to identify the problem. Before learners can begin to solve a problem, all members must understand and agree on the details of the problem. This consensus forms through collaboration and discussion. With online learning on the rise, it is important that learners can engage in collaborative brainstorming and research through the use of technology. Technology allows for groups to collaborate synchronously or asynchronously from anywhere in the world; schedules and geography no longer prevent collaboration in PBL. Today, there is a plethora of tools available to promote group collaboration online, each with unique strengths and limitations. Learning management systems and cloud-based solutions are the two most popular and accessible technological solution for online collaboration. Learning management systems, such as Canvas, Edmodo, Moodle, Schoology, and itslearning, provide schools and classrooms collaborative tools to support synchronous and asynchronous communication and learning.

The learning management systems (LMS) allow for supervision and support by the course administrator or professor. One limitation of these systems is their availability; most LMS are restricted by course enrollment. Students must be enrolled in a particular course or subscribe to a specific class to gain access to the tools and content stored in the system. Cloud-based solutions on the other hand, such as Google Apps, OneNote, and the Office 365 suit offer collaborative tools outside the traditional education setting. Educators of all kinds (K-12 schools, colleges, and universities, vocational training, HR training teams, etc.) can access these cloud-based solutions and collaborate with anyone around the world by simply sharing a link. These tools range in availability from free with an email account to subscription costs based on the suit purchased. In addition to potential financial limitations, these cloud-based systems are always as secure or private as an LMS that requires course enrollment. Both LMS and cloud-based solutions present learners with opportunities to collaborate in a variety of ways while brainstorming the meaning of the problem and developing a plan for research and future collaboration.

==== Research tools ====
Once the problem has been identified, learners move into the second step of PBL: the information gathering phase. In this phase, learners research the problem by gathering background information and researching potential solutions. This information is shared with the learning team and used to generate potential solutions, each with supporting evidence. The most popular online tool for gathering information today is Google, but there are many other search-engines available online. Free search engines, such as Google, Yahoo, or Bing, offer access to seemingly countless links to information. While these research tools provide ample sources of potential information, the quantity can be overwhelming. It also becomes difficult to identify quality sources without adding filters and higher-level search strategies when using these broad search-engines. Libraries are a more selective option and often offer online-databases, but typically require an account or subscription for online access to articles and books. Wolframalpha.com is a smart search-engine with both free and subscription level access options. Wolfram claims to be more than a platform for searching the web, rather, "getting knowledge and answers... by doing dynamic computations based on a vast collection of built-in data, algorithms, and methods."

==== Presentation tools ====
The third most important phase of PBL is resolving the problem, the critical task is presenting and defending your solution to the given problem. Students need to be able to state the problem clearly, describe the process of problem-solving considering different options to overcome difficulties, support the solution using relevant information and data analysis. Being able to communicate and present the solution clearly is the key to the success of this phase as it directly affects the learning outcomes. With the help of technology, presentation has been made much easier and more effective as it can incorporate visual aids of charts, pictures, videos, animations, simulations etc. Ideas and connections between ideas can be clearly demonstrated using different tools. Microsoft PowerPoint 2016, Apple Keynote, Prezi, and Google Slides are among the top-rated presentation applications of 2017.

These popular presentation tools have their distinctive features and advantages over one another and can be summarized into three broad types. The first type has almost everything a presenter needs, ranging from tables, charts, picture tools, animations, video tools, add in functions and so forth. Such tools can replace many authoring tools as more complicated functions such as creating simulations, drag and drop etc. are all made possible. Hence, the presentation can be made highly interactive, engaging and compatible with most devices. The best examples are Microsoft PowerPoint and Apple Keynote. However, one drawback is that such tools often come at a subscription charge and need to be installed locally on devices. Both PowerPoint and Keynote point more towards the standard form of slide by slide presentations. Prezi represents the second major type of tools with a storytelling style and less traditional or structured form of presentation that allows one to zoom in and out of any part of the screen. These tools are generally web-based and have collaborative functions of value-add for the PBL process. Nevertheless, this type of tools also charge subscription fees based on privilege levels. The third broad type of tools would be the web-based ones free of charge with less fanciful effects, allowing access to presentations collaboratively online anytime. Google Slides is such an option which is easy to use. Though it has less functions, it offers the convenience of being available anytime anywhere on any online device. This type can be effective when students have limited time to prepare for their presentations as it removes many technical difficulties such as arranging for face-to-face meetings, installing the presentation tool or the time needed to learn to create the presentation. Students can spend more time on meaningful discussions about their problem and solution instead of the presentation itself.

== P^{5}BL approach ==
P^{5}BL stands for People, Problem, Process, Product and Project Based Learning.

The P^{5}BL approach was a learning strategy introduced in Stanford School of Engineering in their P^{5}BL laboratory in 1993 as an initiative to offer their graduate students from the engineering, architecture and construction disciplines to implement their skills in a "cross-disciplinary, collaborative and geographically distributed teamwork experience". In this approach, which was pioneered by Stanford Professor Fruchter, an environment across six universities from Europe, the United States and Japan along with a toolkit to capture and share project knowledge was developed. The students (people) from the three disciplines were assigned a team project that works on solving a problem and delivering an end-product to a client.

The main stress of this approach is to have an inter-disciplinary integrated development of deliverables, in order to improve the overall competency and skills of the students. P^{5}BL mentoring is a structured activity that involves situated learning and constructivist learning strategies to foster the culture of practice that would extend beyond the university campus to real life. P^{5}BL is all about encouraging teaching and learning teamwork in the information age, by facilitating team interaction with professors, industry mentors and owners who provide necessary guidance and support for the learning activity.

Key advantages of this method are that it familiarizes students with real world problems and improves their confidence in solving these. It also improves their networking skills, thereby establishing rapport with key persons of the industry. They also learn, in an educational setting, the value of teamwork. The method also creates in them an appreciation of interdisciplinary approach.

The approach however needs due consideration of the mentoring provided to the students. Appropriate scaffolding should be done by the mentors to ensure that students are successful in attaining their project goals to solve the problem. Communication between the team should also be open and constructive in nature for achieving the necessary milestones.

== See also ==
- Discovery learning
- Educational psychology
- Learning by teaching (LdL)
- POGIL
- Phenomenon-based learning
- Project-based learning
- 21st century skills

== Sources ==
- Barr, Robert B.; Tagg, John (1995). "From TeachingtoLearning —A New Paradigm for Undergraduate Education". Change: The Magazine of Higher Learning. 27 (6): 12–26. doi:10.1080/00091383.1995.10544672.
- Kirschner, Paul A.; Sweller, John; Clark, Richard E. (2006). "Why Minimal Guidance During Instruction Does Not Work: An Analysis of the Failure of Constructivist, Discovery, Problem-Based, Experiential, and Inquiry-Based Teaching". Educational Psychologist. 41 (2): 75–86. doi:10.1207/s15326985ep4102_1. hdl:1874/16899. S2CID 17067829.
- Merrill, M. David (2002). "A pebble-in-the-pond model for instructional design". Performance Improvement. 41 (7): 41–46. doi:10.1002/pfi.4140410709.
- Schmidt, H. G. (1993). "Foundations of problem-based learning: Some explanatory notes". Medical Education. 27 (5): 422–32. doi:10.1111/j.1365-2923.1993.tb00296.x. hdl:1765/2709. PMID 8208146. S2CID 29515.
- Schmidt, H. G. (1983). "Problem-based learning: Rationale and description". Medical Education. 17 (1): 11–6. doi:10.1111/j.1365-2923.1983.tb01086.x. hdl:1765/2745. PMID 6823214. S2CID 12088195.
