= Gund Institute for Ecological Economics =

Gund Institute for Environment
- Founded: 1992; 34 years ago
- Type: Research
- Location(s): University of Vermont; 617 Main Street; Burlington, Vermont, United States
- Website: www.uvm.edu/giee/

The Gund Institute for Environment (founded 1992), formerly known as the Gund Institute for Ecological Economics and more commonly known as Gund Institute, is a research institute for transdisciplinary scholarship, Based at the University of Vermont (UVM) and comprising diverse faculty, students, and collaborators worldwide. The Gund Institute offers graduate-level training where students are exposed to a wide range of expertise, perspectives, and techniques through course offerings, weekly discussions and seminars, and research mentoring. The Gund Institute offers a Certificate of Graduate Study in Ecological Economics, available both to UVM graduate students and to anyone pursuing continuing education. In addition, it has a series of problem-solving workshops called "Ateliers" and nearly two hundred educational videos.

== Mission ==
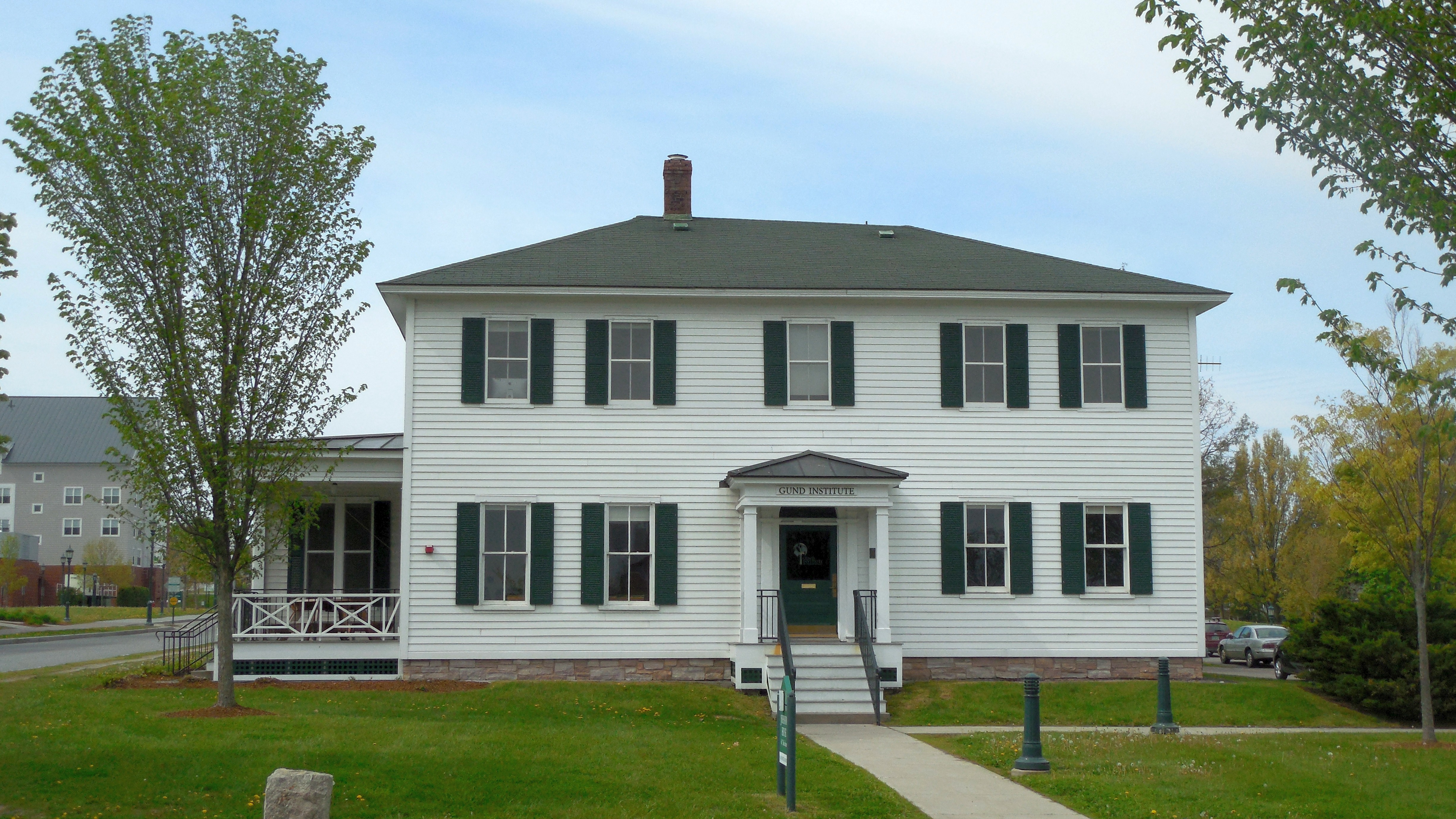
The Johnson House at UVM, the current home of the Gund Institute

The Gund Institute is committed to conducting research at the intersection of ecological, social, and economic systems. Its overarching goal is to develop creative and practical solutions for both local and global environmental challenges. Under the guidance of Director Taylor Ricketts, the institute serves as a collaborative community that includes Gund Fellows, Affiliates, graduate students, visiting scholars, and staff.

Faculty members at UVM are not directly appointed to the Institute itself but instead affiliate with various departments throughout the university. The institute's mission is to provide future leaders with the essential tools and understanding required to navigate the transition toward a sustainable society.

== Projects ==
Three broad, interrelated themes provide centers of gravity for the Gund Institute's research, training, and outreach activities: Nature's Benefits, Ecological Economies, and Healthy Landscapes and Seascapes. Among their research projects are the Vermont Genuine Progress Indicator (GPI) and Natural Capital Project.

== History ==
The Gund Institute was founded by Robert Costanza in 1991 as the Institute for Ecological Economics at the University of Maryland. In 2002, it was moved to the UVM's Rubenstein School of Environment and Natural Resources and renamed the Gund Institute after its major benefactors, the Gund family of Cleveland, Ohio. Robert Costanza continued as director until 2010 when he left to help build a similar institute at Portland State University. Jon Erickson was Managing Director from 2009 to 2012. Taylor Ricketts, former director of the Conservation Science Program of the World Wildlife Fund, was recruited as director in 2011.

== Related books ==
- Ecological Economics, Second Edition: Principles and Applications, by Herman Daly and Josh Farley
- Natural Capital: Theory and Practice of Mapping Ecosystem Services by Taylor Ricketts et al.
- The Very Hungry City: Urban Energy Efficiency and the Economic Fate of Cities, by Austin Troy
- Listed: Dispatches from America's Endangered Species Act, by Joe Roman

== See also ==
- Herman Daly
