= Scrima =

Scrima is a surname of Italian origin, meaning "fencing", referring to a skilled swordsman. Notable people with the surname include:

- Andrea Scrima (born 1960), American novelist, essayist, and artist
- Ronnie Scrima, American dragster and funny car chassis builder
