= Harvard University Press =

American publishing house

- Parent company: Harvard University
- Founded: January 13, 1913; 113 years ago
- Country of origin: United States; 42°22′58.8″N 71°7′37.3″W
- Headquarters location: Cambridge, Massachusetts, U.S.
- Distribution: TriLiteral (United States); John Wiley & Sons (international)
- Key people: George Andreou (Director) Sharmila Sen (Editorial director)
- Publication types: Academic publishing
- Imprints: Belknap
- Official website: www.hup.harvard.edu

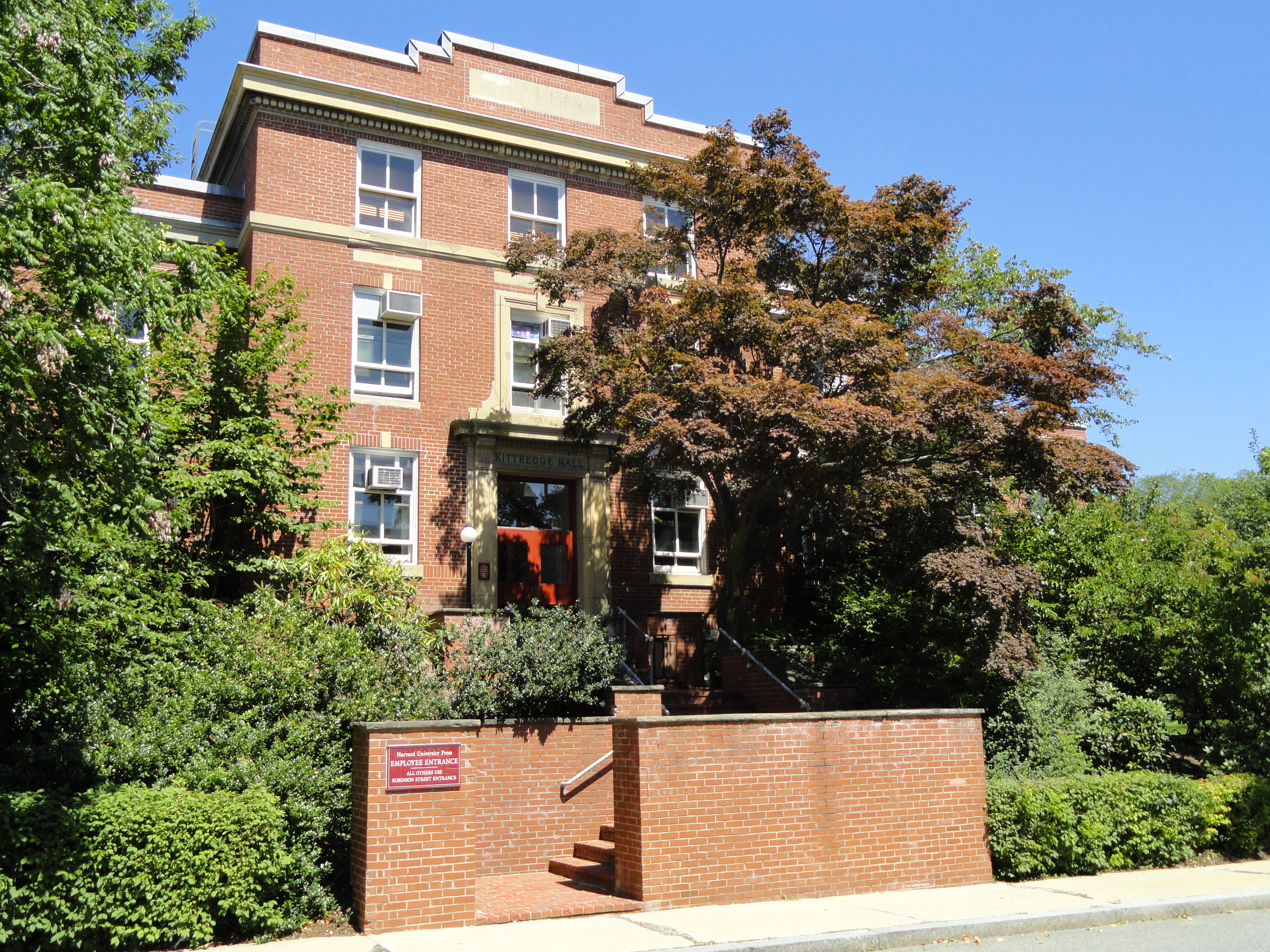
Kittredge Hall, home to Harvard University Press

Harvard University Press (HUP) is a university press and an academic publishing house established on January 13, 1913, as a division of Harvard University. It is a member of the Association of University Presses. George Andreou has served as the press's director since 2017. Sharmila Sen has served as the editorial director since 2019.

The press maintains offices in Cambridge, Massachusetts, near Harvard Square, and in London, England. The press co-founded the distributor TriLiteral LLC with MIT Press and Yale University Press. TriLiteral was sold to LSC Communications in 2018.

Notable authors published by HUP include Eudora Welty, Walter Benjamin, E. O. Wilson, John Rawls, Emily Dickinson, Stephen Jay Gould, Helen Vendler, Carol Gilligan, Amartya Sen, David Blight, Martha Nussbaum, and Thomas Piketty.

The Display Room in Harvard Square, dedicated to selling HUP publications, closed on June 17, 2009.

== Related publishers, imprints, and series ==
HUP owns the Belknap Press imprint, which it inaugurated in May 1954 with the publication of the Harvard Guide to American History. The John Harvard Library book series is published under the Belknap imprint, which was established through an endowment from the estate of art historian and Harvard alumnus Waldron Phoenix Belknap Jr.

Harvard University Press distributes the Loeb Classical Library and is the publisher of the I Tatti Renaissance Library, the Dumbarton Oaks Medieval Library, and the Murty Classical Library of India.

It is distinct from Harvard Business Press, which is part of Harvard Business Publishing, and the independent Harvard Common Press.

== Awards ==
Listed: Dispatches from America's Endangered Species Act by Joe Roman, published in 2011, received the 2012 Rachel Carson Environment Book Award from the Society of Environmental Journalists.

John Doe Chinaman by Beth Lew-Williams was awarded the 2026 Bancroft Prize.

== See also ==
- List of English-language book publishing companies
- List of university presses

== Bibliography ==
- Hall, Max (1986). Harvard University Press: A History. Cambridge, MA: Harvard University Press. ISBN 978-0-674-38080-6.
