= John Harvard Library (series) =

Series of books

The John Harvard Library is a series of books published since 1959 by the Belknap Press of Harvard University Press. The series consists of reprints of historically significant American writings, including historic documents, fiction, poetry, memoirs, and criticism.

== History ==
Founded in 1959, the series bears the name of the first major benefactor of Harvard University. John Harvard (1607-1638) bequeathed half of his estate and his personal library of about 400 books to "New College," which was later named Harvard College in his honor.

During the 1960s and 1970s, the John Harvard Library consisted mainly of authoritative reprints of documents from the colonial era of American history. Among the most noted of these are Bernard Bailyn's edition of Pamphlets of the American Revolution, 1750-1776; Anne Bradstreet's collected works; and the Life of George Washington by Mason L. Weems. Editorial contributors to the series included historians John Hope Franklin and C. Vann Woodward, and poet Adrienne Rich.

The John Harvard Library series was dormant during the 1980s. Beginning in the late 1990s, the series began publishing works from the late 19th century as well as earlier eras.

With the fiftieth anniversary of the series in 2009, Harvard University Press released new paperback editions of four 19th-century works: The Red Badge of Courage, by Stephen Crane; Narrative of the Life of Frederick Douglass; The Common Law, by Oliver Wendell Holmes Jr.; and Uncle Tom's Cabin, by Harriet Beecher Stowe. The new editions had a uniform paperback design.
