= Bethany Brookshire =

American science journalist

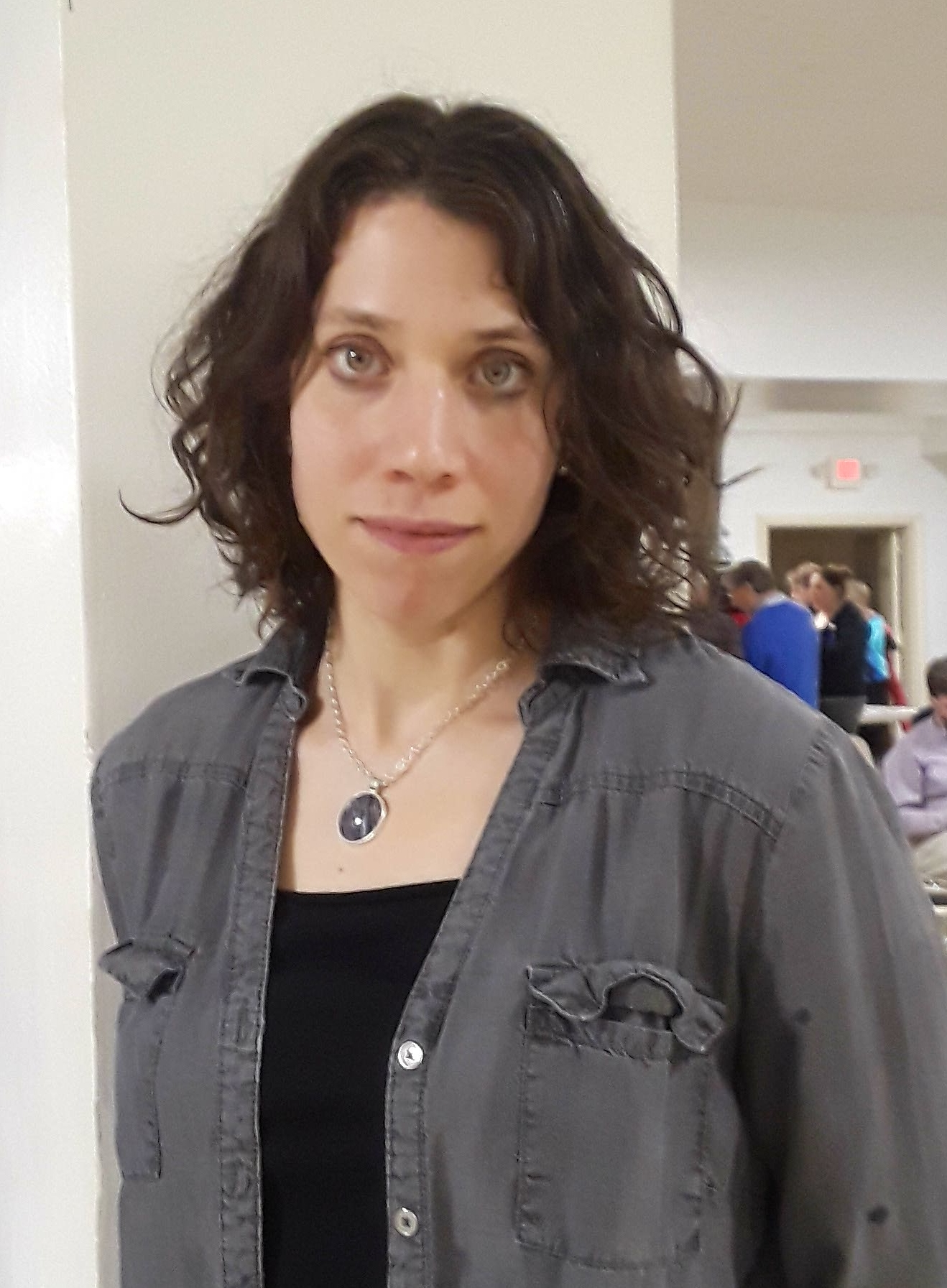
- Education: College of William and Mary (BA, BS); Wake Forest University School of Medicine (PhD)
- Employer: Science News
- Known for: Science journalism

Bethany Brookshire is an American science journalist. She writes for Science News for Students.

== Education ==
Brookshire completed a BA (Philosophy) and BS (Biology) at the College of William & Mary in 2004. She earned a PhD in Physiology and Pharmacology at Wake Forest School of Medicine in 2010, where she worked on ritalin and the serotonin switch with Sara Jones. She began blogging about science in 2008, during her graduate studies. She wrote under the pseudonym "SciCurious" for Discover and The Guardian. She worked as a postdoctoral researcher at the University of Pennsylvania, where she used social media to discuss the brain and psychiatric illness. Here she worked with Irwin Lucki identifying the mechanisms of antidepressants in action.

== Career ==
In 2013, Brookshire began blogging in her own name. Today she writes Eureka!Lab for Science News for Students, and for SciCurious for Science News. She presents the podcast Science for the People, as well as appearing on other science related shows. She appeared on the Story Collider in 2015, a show which tells the stories of scientists, where Brookshire discussed her quest for a mentor. In May 2016 she published Science Blogging: The Essential Guide with Christie Wilcox and Jason Goldman.

She has written for Slate, Scientific American, and The Open Notebook.

Her most recent book, Pests: How Humans Create Animal Villains, was published in December 2022 by Ecco. It focuses on the topic of human-animal interactions.

== Awards ==
- 2009 – Synapse Award from Wake Forest School of Medicine
- 2009 – PLoS ONE Blog Pick of the Month for December
- 2012 – Society for Neuroscience Next Generation Award
- 2011 – 3 Quarks Daily Science Writing Award
- 2014 – Sloan Foundation Writing Grant
- 2016 – Woods Hole Marine Biological Laboratory Logan Science Journalism Fellow
- 2019 – Knight Science Journalism Fellowship
- 2023 – 15th Annual DCSWA Newsbrief Award

>
