= Jon David Erickson =

American economist

Jon D. Erickson
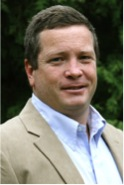
- Born: November 20, 1969 (age 56); Falls Church, Virginia
- Education: Cornell University
- Known for: Founding Member and past-President, U.S. Society for Ecological Economics; Founding Member and past-President, Adirondack Research Consortium
- Awards: Fulbright Scholar (2011); New England Emmy Award (2013, 2011); Adirondack Literary Award (2010)
- Scientific career
- Fields: Ecological Economics; Sustainable Development; Systems modeling
- Workplaces: University of Vermont; Rensselaer Polytechnic Institute; Cornell University
- Doctoral advisor: Duane Chapman

Jon D. Erickson (born 1969) is an American ecological economist, professor of sustainability science and policy at the Rubenstein School of Environment and Natural Resources of the University of Vermont in Burlington, Vermont, United States, and fellow of the Gund Institute for Environment.

== Career ==
Before joining the University of Vermont in 2002 he was assistant professor in the Department of Economics at Rensselaer Polytechnic Institute in Troy, New York, US. He completed his Ph.D. in natural resource economics at Cornell University in 1997.

His research contributes to ecological economic theory and applied work on human health, sustainable development, land and biodiversity conservation, watershed planning, forest management, climate change economics, and renewable energy. This work has been published in 6 books, over 70 peer-reviewed journal articles and book chapters, and over 100 conference papers, research reports, and press articles. He is also adjunct professor at the University of Iceland, was a Fulbright Scholar at the Sokoine University of Agriculture in Tanzania, and has been a visiting professor at the Pontificia Universidad Católica Madre y Maestra in the Dominican Republic and the University of Agriculture in Nitra, Slovakia. He is past president of the U.S. Society for Ecological Economics and the Adirondack Research Consortium; past editor of the Adirondack Journal of Environmental Studies; has served on boards of the International Society for Ecological Economics and Conservation and Research Foundation; was a member of the Technical Advisory Committee of the Lake Champlain Basin Program and the Vermont Governor's Council on Energy and the Environment.

Erickson is also a social entrepreneur, starting and incorporating a number of non-governmental organizations and working intently at the science to policy interface. He co-founded Bright Blue EcoMedia with documentary film producer Victor Guadagno and author Amy Siedl, the non-profit media company that produced the two-time New England Emmy Award-winning Bloom film series. Bloom is a four-part PBS series on the causes and solutions to water pollution and eutrophication in America's rivers and lakes, narrated by Academy award-winning actor Chris Cooper, and including interviews with environmental scholars Bill McKibben, Maude Barlow and John Todd. His latest film collaboration was writing and directing Waking the Sleeping Giant with Jacob Smith, an award-winning, feature-length documentary on the 2016 presidential campaign of Senator Bernie Sanders. He also co-founded the HIV/AIDS prevention education program Futbol para la Vida with Yanlico Munesi Dusdal in the Dominican Republic (DR), modeled after the international Grassroot Soccer program and now with programs for at-risk youth throughout the DR and Haiti managed by the Dominican DREAM Project. In Vermont policy development, his collaboration on the first state-level Genuine Progress Indicator led to a 2012 law to initiate the use of GPI in state policy and budget analysis, and his crowd-sourced media project with Bright Blue led to the Vermont legislature's declaration of March 21, 2012, as Vermont Energy Independence Day.

== Selected work ==
=== Books ===
- Erickson, J.D., The Progress Illusion: Reclaiming Our Future from the Fairytale of Economics, Island Press, Washington, DC, 2022.
- Costanza, R., Erickson, J.D., Farley, J. and I. Kubiszewski (Eds.), Sustainable Wellbeing Futures: a Research and Action Agenda for Ecological Economics, 26 chs., Edward Elgar, Cheltenham, UK, 2020.
- Porter, W.F., Erickson, J.D. and R.S. Whaley (Eds.), The Great Experiment in Conservation: Voices from the Adirondacks, Syracuse University Press, Syracuse, NY, 2009.
- Erickson, J.D. and J.M. Gowdy (Eds.), Frontiers in Ecological Economic Theory and Application, Edward Elgar, Cheltenham, UK, 2007.
- Erickson, J.D., Messner, F. and I. Ring (Eds.), Ecological Economics of Sustainable Watershed Management, Elsevier, Amsterdam, the Netherlands, 2007.
- Farley, J., Erickson, J.D. and H.E. Daly, Ecological Economics: a Workbook for Problem-Based Learning, Island Press, Washington, D.C., 2005.

=== Selected articles ===
- Hong, B., Limburg, K.E., Erickson, J.D., Gowdy, J.M., Nowosielski, A., Polimeni, J. and K. Stainbrook, "Connecting the Ecological-Economic Dots in Human-Dominated Watersheds: Models to Link Socio-Economic Activities on the Landscape to Stream Ecosystem Health," Landscape and Urban Planning 91(2): 78–87, 2009.
- Mazet, J.M., Clifford, D., Coppolillo, P.B., Deolalikar, A.B., Erickson, J.D. and R.R. Kazwala, "A 'One Health' Approach to Address Emerging Zoonoses: The HALI Project in Tanzania," PLoS Medicine 6(12): e1000190, 2009.
- Gowdy, J.M. and J.D. Erickson, "Ecological Economics at a Crossroads," Ecological Economics, 53(1): 17–20, 2005.
- Gowdy, J.M. and J.D. Erickson, "The Approach of Ecological Economics," Cambridge Journal of Economics 29(2): 207–222, 2005.
- Erickson, J.D. and J.M. Gowdy, "Resource Use, Institutions, and Sustainability: A Tale of Two Pacific Island Cultures," Land Economics 76(3): 345–354, 2000.
- Erickson, J.D., Chapman, D., Fahey, T.J. and M.J. Christ, "Nonrenewability in Forest Rotations: Implications for Economic and Ecological Sustainability," Ecological Economics 31(1): 91–106, 1999.
- Erickson, J.D. and D. Chapman, "Photovoltaic Technology: Markets, Economics, and Development," World Development 23(7): 1129–1141, July 1995.
- Erickson, J.D., Chapman, D. and R. Johnny, "Monitored Retrievable Storage of Spent Nuclear Fuel in Indian Country: Liability, Sovereignty, and Socioeconomics," American Indian Law Review 19(1): 73–103, 1994.
- Erickson, J.D., "From Ecology to Economics: the Case Against CO2 Fertilization," Ecological Economics 8: 157–175, 1993.

=== Films ===
- Director, Writer, and Producer, Waking the Sleeping Giant: the Making of a Political Revolution, Premiere at Thin Line Fest, Denton, Texas, April 19, 2017.
- Executive Producer, The Resilient Ones, Broadcast Premiere on Mountain Lake PBS, May 15, 2014.
- Producer, Vermont Energy Independence Day, Broadcast Premiere on Mountain Lake PBS, April 25, 2013.
- Producer / Executive Producer, Lake Defenders, Broadcast Premiere on Mountain Lake PBS, October 18, 2012.
- Executive Producer, Bloom PBS film series:

1. Bloom: the Plight of Lake Champlain, Broadcast Premiere on Mountain Lake PBS, December 2, 2010.
2. Bloom: the Emergence of Ecological Design, Broadcast Premiere on Mountain Lake PBS, February 29, 2012.
3. Bloom: the Agricultural Renaissance, Broadcast Premiere on Mountain Lake PBS, February 29, 2012.
4. Bloom: a New Reverence for Water, Broadcast Premiere on Mountain Lake PBS, February 29, 2012.

- Executive Producer, Transparent Radiation: Rethinking the Future of Nuclear Power, Premiere at the Vermont International Film Festival, October 22, 2011.

== Selected interviews ==
- "Could a Carbon Tax Work for Vermont?," Vermont Public Radio, November 3, 2015.
- "Study Finds Mass. Economy Actually Lagging," Boston Globe, February 5, 2015.
- "Vt. Takes Economic Temp with New Thermometer," Associated Press, July 31, 2013.
- "Economic Quality Over Quantity: What's Our GPI?," Northern Public Radio, WNIJ 89.5 FM, January 22, 2013.
- "Measuring Well-Being Instead of Gross State Product: Genuine Progress Indicator Relies on Alternative Economic Measure," VT Digger, November 26, 2012.
- "New Documentary on Lake Champlain Released," WAMC North Country Public Radio, December 15, 2010.
- "Ecological Economists Seek Quality of Life over Quantity," Greening of the Great Lakes, WJR, Michigan State University, October 22, 2010.
- "Disease Origins and Transmission," Emerging Science, Vermont Public Television, February 23, 2010 (first air date).
- "Ecological Economics," Emerging Science, Vermont Public Television, February 9, 2010 (first air date).
- "The Adirondacks: a Model of Conservation?," Vermont Edition, Vermont Public Radio, November 2, 2009.
- "Jon Erickson," The Reality Report, Global Public Media, April 8, 2009.
- "An Ecological Economist takes to the Pitch to Campaign Against HIV/AIDS in the Dominican Republic," Seed Magazine, July 10, 2006.
