= Paul Braterman =

Scottish chemist

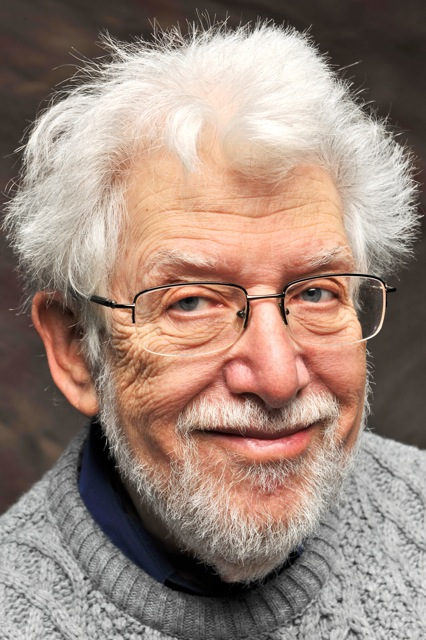
- Paul Braterman
- Born: Paul Sydney Braterman; 16 August 1938 (age 88); London
- Education: St Paul's School, London; Balliol College, Oxford (PhD)
- Scientific career
- Workplaces: University of North Texas; University of Glasgow
- Doctoral advisor: Robert Williams
- Other academic advisors: Herbert D.Kaesz
- Website: paulbraterman.wordpress.com www.gla.ac.uk/schools/chemistry/staff/paulbraterman/

Paul Sydney Braterman (born August 1938) is Emeritus Professor of chemistry at the University of North Texas and honorary senior Research Fellow in Chemistry at the University of Glasgow. Braterman is also a science writer and education campaigner. The author of From Stars to Stalagmites, and over 120 technical publications, Braterman is a board member of the British Centre for Science Education, and the Scottish Secular Society. Braterman has campaigned successfully against creationism in the classroom in both England and Scotland.

== Education and career ==
The grandson of Eastern European Jewish immigrants, Braterman was born and raised in London. He received his Master of Arts and DPhil degrees from Balliol College, Oxford. In 1985 he received a DSc degree.

After postdoctoral research at University College London (adviser Robert Williams), and University of California at Los Angeles (advisers Herbert D. Kaesz and Mostafa El-Sayed), he worked in the chemistry departments of the University of Glasgow, where he rose to the rank of reader, and the University of North Texas as professor and chair, and later as Regents Professor, with several periods as visiting investigator at Scripps Institution of Oceanography at the University of California San Diego, and Sandia National Laboratories.

Braterman's work has been supported by the Robert A. Welch Foundation, the National Science Foundation, and NASA’s exobiology and astrobiology programs, for which he also served as an adviser.

In 2007, he returned to Glasgow where he is now an Honorary Senior Research Fellow.

== Research ==
Braterman is the author of over 120 technical publications and two academic books. He worked as a physical inorganic chemist, but with interests crossing traditional subject boundaries.

An interest in metal carbonyl spectroscopy led on to work on bonding and reactivity in organometallic chemistry. A long-standing interest in charge transfer phenomena, and their possible relevance to photochemical water splitting, led to studies of combined spectroscopy and electrochemistry in Bipyridine derivatives and their transition metal complexes.

Under the influence of Graham Cairns-Smith, he became interested in photochemical and other possible reactions on the early Earth, in connection with the origins of life, and later in isotopic fractionation https://en.wikipedia.org/wiki/Isotope_geochemistry as evidence of reactions taking place there. In view of the possible importance of minerals in the origins of life, he investigated as model systems, the formation and stability of layered double hydroxides, their interaction with chemically bound organic molecules, and effects on particle morphology.

== Activism and writing ==
Since returning to Glasgow in 2007, Paul Braterman has concentrated on educational activities, writing for a broad audience, and campaigning in defence of science education. He is on the board of the British Centre for Science Education, and scientific adviser to the Scottish Secular Society His work with these organisations led to the blocking of teaching of creationism as science in both English and Scottish schools.

His first popular science book, From Stars to Stalagmites, was a Scientific American book club choice.

He has been a regular contributor to 3 Quarks Daily, and his writing has appeared in The Conversation, Scientific American, Newsweek, International Business Times, and Massimo Pigliucci’s Scientia Salon.

Braterman has also contributed to The Panda's Thumb (blog) in an article entitled Creationism and climate - Birth of a new Pseudoscience.
