= Anne Jefferson =

American hydrologist (born 1979)

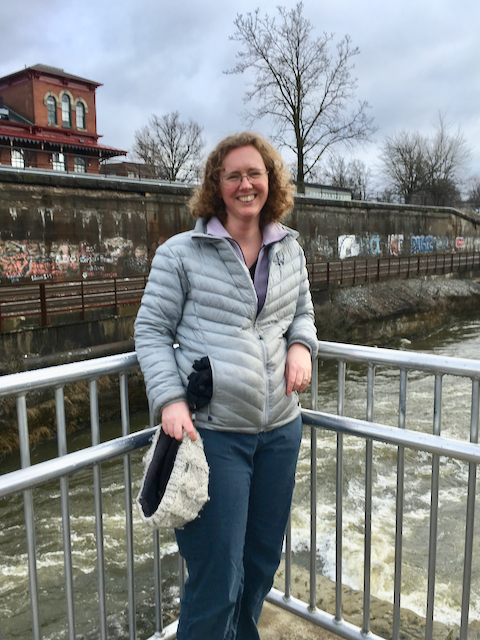
- Jefferson on banks of Cuyahoga River, Ohio
- Born: 1979 (age 46–47)
- Education: Ph.D in Geology from Oregon State University
- Occupation: Professor at the University of Vermont
- Known for: urban hydrology, stormwater management, watershed hydrology, land cover change, volcanic landscapes
- Website: all-geo.org/jefferson

Anne Jarvis Jefferson is an American hydrologist who specializes in watershed hydrology, urban hydrology, and hydroecology. As of 2023, she is the Patrick Chair in Watershed Science and Planning at the Rubenstein School of Environment and Natural Resources at the University of Vermont. Previously she was an associate professor at Kent State University in the Department of Geology, which became the Department of Earth Sciences.

Jefferson is notable for her work in urban landscapes and stormwater management, watershed hydrology of streams, rivers and groundwater, green infrastructure, land cover change, water resources and climate change impacts. She is a supporter of women in science and has completed multiple citizen outreach programs.

== Early life and education ==
=== Early life ===
Born 1979, Anne Jefferson grew up in Winona, Minnesota. Jefferson has a long interest in landslides, snowmelt runoff channels and river and groundwater flow. In May 1997, Jefferson won the top prize at the 48th annual International Science and Engineering Fair (the Glenn T. Seaborg Nobel Trip Award). Her project was titled "Pool 6 – Mississippi River Sediment Budget: Movement and Storage," which examined at the activity of sediment in the Upper Mississippi River.

=== Education ===
Upon graduating from Winona Senior High school, Jefferson went on to earn her B.A. in Earth and Planetary Science from Johns Hopkins University (advisor: Hope Jahren) with university and departmental honors. She then earned an M.S. in Water Resource Science from the University of Minnesota in 2002, and four years later completed her Ph.D. in geology from Oregon State University and wrote her dissertation on the “Hydrology and Geomorphic Evolution of Basaltic Landscapes, High Cascades, Oregon."

== Career and research ==
Since 2023, Jefferson has worked as professor at the Rubenstein School of Environment and Natural Resources at the University of Vermont. Prior to that, from 2016 to 2022, she was an Associate Professor and graduate studies coordinator in the Department of Geology (later Earth Sciences) at Kent State University, Kent, Ohio. Prior to that, she was an assistant professor in the Department of Geography and Earth Science at the University of North Carolina, in Charlotte, North Carolina. She was also a Postdoctoral Research Associate at Oregon State University.

Jefferson's lab focuses on watershed hydrology, urban hydrology and hydroecology, climate change impacts, isotope hydrology, and landscape evolution in human-affected and volcanic landscapes. Current projects in her lab focus on green infrastructure, stormwater management, and how urbanization and restoration efforts affect flow, sediment, and water quality. Her research has been supported by the National Science Foundation, the U.S. Environmental Protection Agency, and various state and local organizations.

== Honors and professional recognition ==
Jefferson was a National Science Foundation Graduate Research Fellow at Oregon State University.

In 2016 she was selected as an Alan Leshner Leadership Fellow of the American Association for the Advancement of Science.

=== Memberships ===
Jefferson is on the Board of Directors of CUAHSI (Consortium of Universities for the Advancement of Hydrologic Science, Inc.).

She is a working group member of the “Evolving Urban-Water Systems,” for the International Association for Hydrological Sciences, Panta Rhei Scientific Decade, 2013–2022.

She is a member of the American Geophysical Union, the Geological Society of America, the Earth Science Women's Network (ESWN), the American Association for the Advancement of Science

== Other interests ==
=== Women in science ===
Her mother is a plant ecologist who received her PhD in 1974. In large part due to this, Jefferson understands the importance of women in science. When she was 18 Jefferson participated in the 25th Anniversary of Title IX event at The White House on July 18, 1997. Since then, Jefferson has been an advocate for women in science.

=== Civic science and public engagement ===
Jefferson is an avid Twitter user and science blogger and works to make science information accessible to the general public. She chaired the public forum "The Fourth Annual Kent State University Water and Land symposium" in October 2016 where she facilitated a broader conversation on stormwater and climate change. Jefferson has conducted multiple citizen science projects with collaborators, such as Cleveland Metroparks and Cuyahoga Valley National Park, to engage locals communities and has worked on ways in which educational institutions and scientists can engage the public. Jefferson has been an advocate for government funding of science research and environmental protection, and has written op-eds and has given numerous media interviews.

== Selected works ==
Jefferson has conducted a wide range of research from volcanic landscapes in the Oregon Cascades to stormwater management and effects of urbanization on watershed hydrology.

- If a tree falls in an urban stream, does it stick around? Mobility, characteristics, and geomorphic influence of large wood in urban streams in northeastern Ohio, USA., Geomorphology. 337: 1–14. doi: 10.1016/j.geomorph.2019.03.033. 2019. Blauch, G. and Jefferson, A.J.
- Stormwater management network effectiveness and implications for urban watershed function: a critical review, Hydrological Processes. 31 (23): 4056–4080, doi:10.1002/hyp.11347. 2017. Jefferson, A.J., Bhaskar, A., Fanelli, R., Hopkins, K.G., Avellaneda, P.M., and McMillan, S.K.
- Simulation of the cumulative hydrological response to green infrastructure, Water Resources Research. 53, doi:10.1002/2016WR019836. 2017. Avellaneda, P.M., Jefferson, A.J., Grieser, J.M., and Bush, S.A., .
- Assessing the effects of street-scale green infrastructure retrofits on hydrograph characteristics, northeastern Ohio, USA, Hydrologic Processes, 30(10):1536-1550. doi: 10.1002/hyp.10736. 2016. Jarden, K.M., Jefferson, A.J., and Grieser, J.M.
- Application of isotope hydrograph separation to understand urban stormwater dynamics, Hydrological Processes, 29(25): 5290-5306. doi: 10.1002/hyp.10680. 2015. Jefferson, A.J., Bell, C.D., Clinton, S., and McMillan, S.
- Controls on the hydrological landscape evolution of shield volcanoes and volcanic ocean islands, pp. 185–214 in Harpp, K.S., Mittelstaedt, E., d’Ozouville, N., and Graham, D.W. (eds), The Galapágos: A Natural Laboratory for the Earth Sciences, AGU Geophysical Monograph Series. 2014. Jefferson, A.J., Ferrier, K., Perron, J.T., and Ramalho, R.
- Channel network extent in the context of historical land use, flow generation processes, and landscape evolution, Earth Surface Processes and Landforms, 38(6): 601–613, doi:10.1002/esp.3308. 2013. Jefferson, A.J. and McGee, R.W.
- Seasonal versus transient snow and the elevation dependence of climate sensitivity in maritime mountainous regions, Geophysical Research Letters, 38, L16402, doi:10.1029/2011GL048346. 2011. Jefferson, A.J.
- Coevolution of hydrology and topography on a basalt landscape in the Oregon Cascade Range, USA, Earth Surface Processes and Landforms,35(7): 803–816. doi: 10.1002/esp.1976. 2010. Jefferson, A.J., Grant, G., Lancaster, S., and Lewis, S.
- Hydrogeologic controls on streamflow sensitivity to climatic variability, Hydrological Processes. 22: 4371–4385. 2008. Jefferson, A.J., Nolin, A., Lewis, S., and Tague, C.
