= POGIL =

Instructional strategy

Process Oriented Guided Inquiry Learning (POGIL) is an activity-based, group-learning instructional strategy.

POGIL was created in 1994 to improve teaching of general chemistry. Today, POGIL is implemented in more than 1,000 American high schools and colleges.

== Activities ==
The design of a POGIL activity must be sufficient in appropriate information for the initial exploration so that students are able to develop the desired concepts. Second, the guiding questions must be sequenced so that students reach the appropriate conclusion.

Typically, the first few questions build on students' prior knowledge and direct attention to the information provided by the model. This is followed by questions designed to help promote the recognitions of relationships and patterns in the data, leading toward some concept development. The final questions may involve applying the concepts to new situations and generalizing students' new knowledge and understanding. POGIL instruction has a strong basis in constructivism.

Students in a POGIL classroom may work in small groups of three or four to tackle a specifically designed activity. Each student is assigned a role, such as a task manager, recorder, spokesperson, or reflector. The instructor acts as a facilitator. In their groups, students may discuss and analyze problems and their answers to questions that are crafted. As they formulate their ideas, they may share their understanding and discoveries with other groups.

Rather than having the instructor begin class by defining terms and laying out concepts, students work actively to understand the content.

== The POGIL Project ==
Logo of The POGIL Project

The teaching method of POGIL is supported by the POGIL Project, a non-profit 501(c)(3) organization based in Lancaster, Pennsylvania. The project trains faculty to implement POGIL in their classrooms and creates new POGIL materials through opportunities including workshops, on-site visits, and consultancies. The project also hosts an annual POGIL National Meeting.
