= Andrea Scrima =

American novelist, essayist, and artist

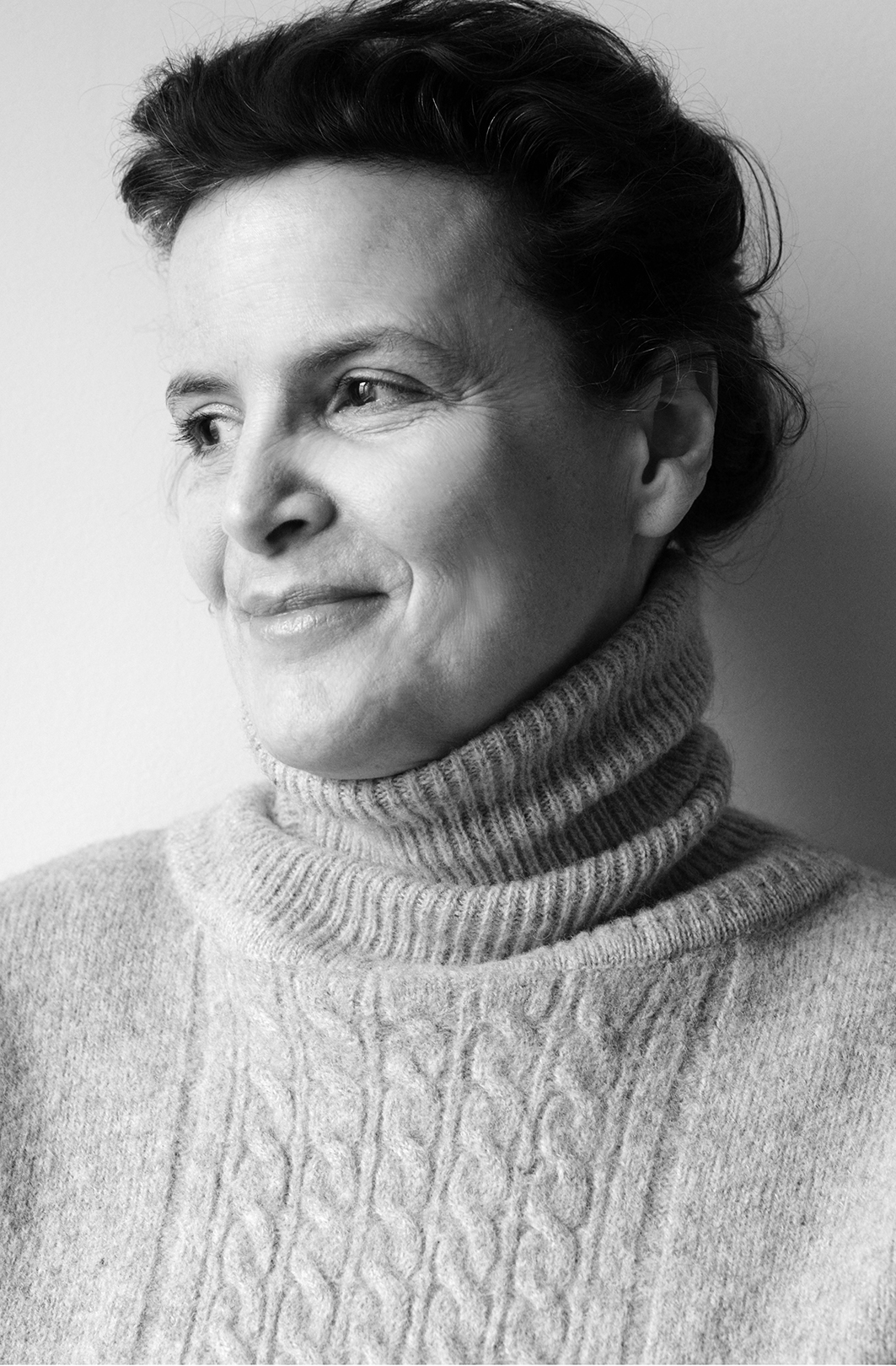
- Scrima in 2016
- Born: 1960 (age 65–66); New York City, U.S.
- Education: Parsons School of Design; Cooper Union; School of Visual Arts (BFA); Berlin University of the Arts
- Occupations: Installation artist; writer; critic
- Writing career
- Genre: Fiction
- Notable work: A Lesser Day
- Notable awards: Lingener Kunstpreis, Pollock-Krasner Foundation
- Website: andreascrima.com

Andrea Scrima (born 1960 in New York City) is an American novelist, essayist, and artist living in Berlin, Germany. An extensive essay on her experiences as an American living more than half her life abroad appeared 3 July 2018 in The Millions. In 2021, these observations were continued in the essay “On the Weaponization of Language in a Traumatized Nation,” published in LitHub.

== Early life ==
Andrea Scrima grew up on Staten Island, New York as one of four children. An early interest in mathematics led to a National Science Foundation scholarship for the high school summer program in mathematics at Bard College in 1977. From the age of fifteen, she took part in courses in painting and drawing at the Parsons School of Design's Summer Program and the Saturday Program at Cooper Union. Scrima studied fine arts at the School of Visual Arts and received a BFA in 1983. In 1984, a scholarship from the Stiftung Luftbrückendank brought her to West Berlin, where she received the German Meisterschüler degree in fine arts at the Berlin University of the Arts in 1986.

== Career ==
Scrima has received numerous awards for her artistic work, including the Lingener Kunstpreis and a grant from the Pollock-Krasner Foundation. She worked mainly in painting and text installation and exhibited widely before she began writing in a literary context.

=== Novels ===
Scrima's first book, A Lesser Day, was published in 2010. A German edition titled Wie viele Tage was published in 2018. In an early review, The Brooklyn Rail called it a "small, wondrous book", and reviewed it once again when the second edition came out in 2018, calling it a "brilliant debut novel" in which a "delicious unease slowly builds".

A Lesser Day records an artist's restless life on two continents as five locations in Berlin and New York of the 1980s and 1990s serve as touchstones for a work of poetic prose that inquires into the way memory inscribes itself into place. Kate Christensen writes: "Scrima paints vivid, detailed memories of places to evoke a web of intimate relationships that emerges gradually from a temporal fog into shocking, unforgettable clarity", while Robert Goolrick calls A Lesser Day "a monument to the human struggle to survive, to remember, to understand, and to love". The German translation, titled Wie viele Tage, was published by Literaturverlag Droschl, Graz, Austria in 2018 to great acclaim, with Bettina Schulte of the Badische Zeitung noting its "uncanny precision of perception" and Claudia Fuchs of SWR2 its "remarkable freedom of thought and agency". In the German daily paper Die Taz, Elisabeth Wagner writes: "The narrator of A Lesser Day takes her ambivalence, her 'difficulty with the present tense' as the departure point of a quest in which writing becomes a means of merging with life. In her mind, she need only open a drawer in the old kitchen cabinet on Staten Island or imagine the Italian language primers from school or remember how, 'in this vast empire of our childhood,’ she invented 'scientific facts' about the universe for her brother, and already the figures are set into motion (...) This is a high art, and it testifies to the richness of a book that succeeds in freeing itself from any concerns of self-assertion to create a space in which the reader indeed begins to think more precisely, see more clearly—and become more receptive and sentient."

Scrima received a literature grant from the Berlin Council on Science, Research, and the Arts in 2004; she won a Hackney Literary Award for her short story Sisters and took part in residencies at Ledig House, New York; and Schloss Salem, Germany. An excerpt of a novel-in-progress won second prize in the National Glimmer Train Fiction Open.

Scrima took part in the 2016 Stadtsprachen Literary Festival in Berlin and was invited to read from and discuss the German edition of A Lesser Day, Wie viele Tage, at the 2018 Poetische Quellen literary festival in Bad Oeynhausen and the 2018 Erlanger Poetenfest in Erlangen, Germany.

In 2021, Literaturverlag Droschl published the German edition of Scrima’s second novel, Like Lips, Like Skins, under the title Kreisläufe, a word that carries multiple meanings including cycles, circuits, circulations, which are themes in this novel about family trauma. Kreisläufe received extensive praise in the German-language press, with Paul Jandl of the Neue Zürcher Zeitung observing: “With tender justice and laconic resistance, it seeks to elucidate grievances in family relationships, one might say the injustice of life itself (...) In the end, there aren’t very many authors writing in the literary field today as capable of evoking these images in such detail and with such depth as Andrea Scrima.” Maria Frisé calls Scrima a “powerful storyteller” in the Frankfurter Allgemeine Zeitung, while Dussmann's included Kreisläufe in their podcast “Criminally Underrated” and spoke about “the genius of this book,” (...) which “spreads out into wider reflections on how memory works, and how we often only remember the memory of a memory, or the story of a memory we’ve told ourselves.” Anne Kohlick of Deutschlandfunkkultur writes: “Again and again, between its temporal layers, the book opens up the various ‘cans’ that memory is stored in. And just like with the fabled Pandora's Box, the moment the lid is removed, dangerous forces rush to escape: emotional and physical abuse, mental illness, the devastating after-effects of psychopharmaceuticals—and all of it presented in a fragmentary narrative form that echoes the very structures our memories operate within.” In the taz, Elisabeth Wagner calls the book “wise and beautiful (…) it’s hard to imagine not admiring the formal sophistication of this book. The delicate transitions between grammatical forms of past and present, for instance, which slip by unnoticed as one moves through time and space.” Kreisläufe was also reviewed in the magazines Hotlist and literaturblatt and the blogs Gute Literatur—Meine Empfehlung and Literaturleuchtet. The German author Ally Klein interviewed Andrea Scrima for a two-part interview published on Three Quarks Daily. Andrea Scrima has received several research grants from the Berlin Council on Science, Research, and the Arts, has spent several working periods in Florence, Italy, as the guest of the Villa Romana, and was awarded a 2023 fellowship at the Helene Wurlitzer Foundation in Taos, New Mexico.

=== Visual art ===
Prior to her decision to focus on literature, Scrima worked as a professional artist for many years, incorporating short fiction pieces into large-scale text installations, many of which have been site-specific. She has received numerous awards for her artistic work, including the Lingener Kunstpreis and a grant from the Pollock-Krasner Foundation, and has exhibited internationally. In 2018, she presented the exhibition "The Ethnic Chinese Millionaire" in the Berlin project space Manière Noire, a room-sized text installation based on the description of a newspaper photograph. In 2020, Scrima took part in a group show at the Haus der Statistik titled “The New Normal” with drawings and a video of her essay "Corona Report." In 2021, the Katharina Maria Raab Gallery in Berlin included four work groups from Scrima's drawing series Loopy Loonies in the exhibition "Fragility." In 2021/22, Andrea Scrima collaborated with the artist Anike Joyce Sadiq on a joint piece on institutional criticism in the form of a conversation titled "Against the Erasure of Dissent," published in the German original by Künstlerhaus Stuttgart and presented at the Villa Romana in the context of the conference series "Manifestiamo."

=== Literary criticism ===
Scrima has written critical essays for numerous journals including The Rumpus, The Brooklyn Rail, Music & Literature, The Scofield, The Quarterly Conversation, Hyperion: On the Future of Aesthetics, The Millions, Times Literary Supplement, LitHub, and The American Scholar, as well as the German-language journals Schreibheft, Schreibkraft, the Frankfurter Allgemeine Zeitung, and Manuskripte.

She is a Monday columnist at 3QuarksDaily and editor-in-chief at the literary magazine Statorec, where she has published "Beyond the Bosphorus," "The Corona Issue," many of the works anthologized in Writing the Virus, a New York Times Sunday Book Review "New & Notable" title of 2021, and the more recent "Strange Bedfellows," a joint project with the Austrian literary magazine Manuskripte.

== Bibliography ==
=== Novels ===
- A Lesser Day (2010). Second Edition 2018. ISBN 978-1-933132-77-8
- Wie viele Tage (2018, German translation of A Lesser Day). Translation: Barbara Jung. ISBN 978-3-990590-13-3
- Kreisläufe (2021, German translation of Like Lips, Like Skins). Translation: Andrea Scrima and Christian von der Goltz. ISBN 978-3-99059-091-1

=== Anthologies ===
- Wreckage of Reason II: Back to the Drawing Board (ed. Nava Renek). Spuyten Duyvil Press, Brooklyn, New York, 2014. All about love, nearly: excerpt from the blog Stories I tell myself when I can’t get to sleep at night. ISBN 978-0-923389-95-6
- Strange Attractors (ed. Edie Meidav). University of Massachusetts Press, Cambridge, Massachusetts, March 2019. All about love, nearly: excerpt from the blog Stories I tell myself when I can’t get to sleep at night. ISBN 9781625344243
- Writing the Virus (ed. Andrea Scrima and David Dario Winner). Outpost19 Books, San Francisco, November 2020. “Corona Report.” ISBN 9781944853778

=== Short stories ===
- Sisters. Published November 2017 on the literary website Statorec. Winner of a 2007 Hackney Literary Award
- Pandora's Children. Published November 2017 on the literary website Statorec

=== Essays (selection) ===
- “The Slovenes of Lienz-Peggetz,” 3QuarksDaily, 1 August 2022
- “Against the Erasure of Dissent,” 3QuarksDaily, 6 June 2022 (with Anike Joyce Sadiq)
- “Returning to the Villa Romana,” 3QuarksDaily, 11 April 2022
- “On the Weaponization of Language in a Traumatized Nation,” LitHub, 18 June 2021
- “Wenn die Sprache zur Waffe wird,” Frankfurter Allgemeine Sonntagszeitung, 6 June 2021 (in German language)
- “Lessons in Abstraction: The strange life of Europe’s most overlooked modernist,” The American Scholar, 1 June 2021
- "Corona Report." Statorec, 16 April 2020
- "Slowly Falling: Andrea Scrima Recalls November 1989 in Berlin,” Times Literary Supplement, 5 November 2019
- “Fiction in a World of Fear,” 3QuarksDaily, 9 September 2019
- A Conversation between Andrea Scrima and Myriam Naumann on The Ethnic Chinese Millionaire,” 3QuarksDaily, 4 March 2019
- "Between the Lines." 3Quarks Daily, 20 August 2018
- "Was ist Patriotismus? Wie ich Amerika verlor." Frankfurter Allgemeine Zeitung, 19 August 2018 (in German language)
- "Amerikas blinde Flecken: Don DeLillo (wieder)lesen in dunklen Zeiten." Schreibheft, No. 91, August 2018 (in German language)
- "Dubravka Ugrešić’s Fox." Music & Literature, 10 July 2018
- "The Problem with Patriotism: A Critical Look at Collective Identity in the U.S. and Germany." The Millions, 3 July 2018
- "Über die Unnachahmliche Lydia Davis." Manuskripte, Zeitschrift für Literatur, No. 220, June 2018 (in German language)
- "Zwischen den Zeilen." Schreibkraft, No. 32, "Lesen und lesen lassen", June 2018 (in German language)
- "The Problem of Home." The Scofield, issue 3.1, Winter 2017/2018
- "On the Impossibility of Writing: Rainald Goetz." The Brooklyn Rail, Winter 2017/2018 (online and print editions)
- "Wie viele Tage." [excerpt from the novel] Manuskripte, Zeitschrift für Literatur, No. 218, December 2017 (in German language)
- "Rereading Don DeLillo in Dark Times." Adapted from a lecture given on 28 April 2017 at the New School, New York City. The Quarterly Conversation, No. 48, June 2017, republished in 3 Quarks Daily
- "On David Krippendorff’s Nothing Escapes My Eyes." Lute & Drum, No. 7, October 2016
- "This is US: Sang Real. Andrea Scrima talks to Patricia Thornley." Lute & Drum, No. 1, February 2015
- "Mother Tongue: Leora Skolkin-Smith with Andrea Scrima." The Brooklyn Rail, winter 2014/2015 (online and print editions)
- "The World’s Continuous Breathing: On the first and last stories of Clarice Lispector" in the collection A bela e a fera. Music & Literature, No. 4, spring 2014 (print edition)
- "On the Inimitable Lydia Davis." The Quarterly Conversation, No. 35, spring 2014, republished in 3QuarksDaily
- "Amazon in Exile: Lynda Schor’s Sexual Harassment Rules." The Brooklyn Rail, winter 2013/2014 (online and print editions)
- "Seiobo There Below by László Krasznahorkai." The Quarterly Conversation, No. 33, fall 2013, republished in 3QuarksDaily
- "A Few Words and the Scrap of a Tune: The Big Music by Kirsty Gunn." The Quarterly Conversation, No. 31, spring 2013
- "Festival Neuer Literatur: Spotlight on New Writing from Austria, Germany, and Switzerland." The American Reader, February 2013
- "All Words Suddenly Become Ridiculous: On Three Recent Translations of Thomas Bernhard." Hyperion: On the Future of Aesthetics, Vol. 7–1, January 2013
- "Observations on Writing in Rainald Goetz." Hyperion: On the Future of Aesthetics, Vol. 7–1, January 2013
- "Robert Walser’s The Walk (Der Spaziergang)." The Brooklyn Rail, October 2012 (online and print editions)
- "A Complete and Lucid Whole" (on Marek Bieńczyk, Transparency). The Brooklyn Rail, August 2012 (online and print editions)
- "Robert Walser’s The Walk (Der Spaziergang)." The Rumpus, 23 July 2012
- "A Preposterous Proposal, But No, Not Quite: Helen DeWitt’s Lightning Rods." The Rumpus, 16 February 2012
- "When Everything Stinks of Decay" (on Thomas Bernhard, Heldenplatz). The Brooklyn Rail, June 2011 (online and print editions)
- "From Whatever Was Left of Their Authentic Selves" (on Andrew Foster Altschul, Deus Ex Machina). The Brooklyn Rail, February 2011 (online and print editions)
- "The Political Eisenberg" (on Deborah Eisenberg, Collected Stories). The Brooklyn Rail, November 2010 (online and print editions)
- "Tales of Woe" (on John Reed, Tales of Woe). The Rumpus, 16 November 2010
- "Something That Can Never Be Said With Words" (on Jon Fosse, Aliss at the Fire). The Rumpus, 20 September 2010
- "Amnesia as a means of staying sane," Children of Berlin, ex. cat., P.S.1, N.Y. 2000
- "Geschichten vom Werden der Kunst." (Shelf Life—Stories of the making of art), with Katrin Bettina Müller, neue bildende kunst, 1/97, February–March 1997 (in German language)
- Andrea Scrima, "Through the Bullethole", New Observations: Voyeur’s Delight, Issue No. 112, N.Y., September 1996
- "Künstler und Kritiker" (Artists and Art Critics), with Katrin Bettina Müller, Alltag, Elefantenpress, Berlin, Volume 66, December 1994 (in German language)

== Interviews ==
- "Decoding a Language, Part Two: An Interview with Andrea Scrima About Her New Novel Like Lips, Like Skins," 3QuarksDaily, 14 February 2022
- “Decoding A Language: An Interview with Andrea Scrima About Her New Novel Like Lips, Like Skins,” 3QuarksDaily, 20 December 2021
- “Andrea Scrima und ihr Roman Kreisläufe.” Das Rote Mikro, 1 November 2021 (in German language)
- “Zu Gast: Andrea Scrima, Künstlerin und Autorin.” RBB Kultur, Der Tag, 26 August 2021 (in German language)
- “Musik und Fragen zur Person: Die Künstlerin Andrea Scrima.” Deutschlandfunk, Zwischentöne, 28 October 2018 (in German language)
- "A Faint Distrust of Words: Interview between Andrea Scrima and Christopher Heil." 3QuarksDaily, 17 September 2018
- "Andrea Scrima / Museum of Non-Visible Art." Yale University Radio, August 2018
- "Schriftstellerin Andrea Scrima: 'In Amerika könnte ich kaum mehr geistig überleben.'" Neue Zürcher Zeitung, 30 July 2018 (in German language)
- "Portrait einer Künstlerin als junge Frau: Andrea Scrima im Gespräch mit Joachim Scholl." Lesart, Deutschlandfunk Kultur 6 July 2018 (in German language)
- "Patterns of Erosion: A Conversation with Andrea Scrima." Music & Literature, 26 April 2018 (online edition)
- "Andrea Scrima: Wie viele Tage: Literadio." Leipzig Book Fair 2018, broadcast on 15 March 2018 (in German language)
- "Interview, Andrea Scrima / Museum of Non-Visible Art." Yale University Radio, October 2016
- "Parataxis and Ponzi Schemes: On the Wreckage of Reason Anthology." The Brooklyn Rail, July 2015 (online and print editions)
- "In the Gaps Between Things: Andrea Scrima’s A Lesser Day." The Brooklyn Rail, May 2015 (online and print editions)

== Reviews ==
=== Literature reviews (selection) ===
- Gibran, Criminally Underrated, Dussmann’s Podcast, 27 May 2022 (at 1:22)
- Marina Buettner, “Andrea Scrima: Kreisläufe,” literaturleuchtet, 12 May 2022
- Elisabeth Wagner, “Die Kraft der Anziehung,” Die Taz, 21 April 2022
- Maria Frisé, “Nicht vergessen, dass man weggehen kann,” Frankfurter Allgemeine Zeitung, 8 April 2022
- Nicoletta Kiss, “Andrea Scrima: Kreisläufe,” Morehotlist, 1 April 2022
- Gallus Frei-Tomic, “Andrea Scrima: Kreisläufe,” literaturblatt, 27 January 2022
- Paul Jandl, “Der Geruch von Ravioli – und gleich ist das ganze Elend der Kindheit wieder gegenwärtig,” Neue Zürcher Zeitung, 10 January 2022
- Anne Kohlick, “Erinnerungen, die ungebeten ins Bewusstsein dringen,” Deutschlandfunkkultur, 6 October 2021
- Petra Lohrmann, “Andrea Scrima: Kreisläufe,” Gute Literatur – Meine Empfehlung, October 2021
- Jana Fuchs, "Das Denken in Schleifen", Literaturkritik.de, University Mainz, 5 October 2018
- Aimee Parkison, "The Delicious Unease of A Lesser Day,” The Brooklyn Rail, September 2018
- Dirk Windmöller, "Große Geschichten bei den Poetischen Quellen", Neue Westfälische Zeitung, 27 August 2018
- Isabella Caldart, "Neue Berlin-Bücher. Über den Teich", Tip Magazin, 5 September 2018
- Nicole Seifert, "Wie viele Tage von Andrea Scrima", Nacht und Tag, 30 July 2018
- Marina Büttner, "Andrea Scrima: Wie viele Tage", Literaturleuchtet, 20 June 2018
- Michaela Gericke, "Andrea Scrima, bildende Künstlerin", Kulturradio RBB, 31 May 2018
- Bettina Schulte, "Mosaiksteine, die sich nicht zum Bild fügen", Badische Zeitung, 17 May 2018
- Ulrich Rüdenauer, "Brooklyn, Berlin: Wie viele Tage von Andrea Scrima", Süddeutsche Zeitung, 3 May 2018
- Anton Thuswaldner, "Das Ich, umkreist wie ein Fremdkörper", Die Furche, supplement "Booklet", April 2018
- Gallus Frei-Tomic, "Andrea Scrima: Wie viele Tage, Droschl", literaturblatt.ch, 10 April 2018
- Claudia Fuchs, "Andrea Scrima, Wie viele Tage,” SWR2, 3 April 2018
- Klaus Bittner, "Andrea Scrima: Wie viele Tage,” Buchtipps Spring 2018
- Senta Wagner, "Leben in Koffern", Buchkultur 177, April 2018
- Isabella Caldart, "Andrea Scrima—Wie viele Tage,” Novellieren, 20 February 2018
- Elisabeth Wagner, "Geheimnisvoller Heimweg", Die taz, weekend issue, 10–11 February 2018
- Kevin T.S. Tang, "A Lesser Day", KGB Bar Lit Magazine, 2010
- Kevin Evers, "Renewed, Transfigured", The Rumpus, 26 August 2010
- Lauren Smith, “A Lesser Day by Andrea Scrima", Bookslut, July 2010
- Nicolle Elizabeth, "Small Wonder", The Brooklyn Rail, April 2010

=== Art reviews ===
- Andreas Rauth, "Der chinesischstämmige Millionär. Andrea Scrima", Jitter Magazin für Kunst und visuelle Kultur, September 2018
- Peter Herbstreuth, "Nachwehende Gedanken der enttäuschten Liebe" (The lingering pain of a disappointed love), Tagesspiegel, October 25, 1998
- Katja Reissner, "Narzißtisches Reigen: Die museumsakademie zeigt eine Ausstellung von Andrea Scrima" (Narcissistic Dance: the museumsakademie presents an exhibition by Andrea Scrima), Tagesspiegel, 19 September 1998
- "Ursel Schmitz liest Texte von Andrea Scrima" (Ursel Schmitz reads texts by Andrea Scrima), Freie Presse, Zwickau, 21 July 1997
- Katrin Bettina Müller, "Andrea Scrima erzählt Geschichten vom Werden der Kunst" (Stories of the making of art told by Andrea Scrima), Tip Magazine, 24/96, November 1996
- Katja Reissner, "Wunschlose Wehmut—Andrea Scrima, Künstlerin" (Wistful, yet content—Andrea Scrima, Artist), Tagesspiegel, 17 November 1996
- Stefan Lüddemann, "Das Leben als Verlieren—Lingen zeigt die neue Kunstpreisträgerin Andrea Scrima" (Life as Loss—Lingen shows the new art prize recipient Andrea Scrima), Neuer Osnabrücker Zeitung, No. 269/46, 16 November 1996
- Stuart Servetar, "Andrea Scrima: Shelf Life", Time Out New York, Issue 50, September 1996
- Peter Herbstreuth, "Malerei als Medium" (Painting as Medium), Kunstforum, Volume 133, February–April 1996
- Thomas Wulffen, "Bilder in Worten" (Images in Words), in the catalogue to the exhibition Painting as Medium, Neuer Berliner Kunstverein, November 1995
- Andreas Quappe, "Durchscheinende Farbschichten—die Künstlerin Andrea Scrima in der Galerie Mittelstraße in Potsdam" (Layers of paint shining through—The artist Andrea Scrima in the Galerie Mittelstraße in Potsdam), Tagesspiegel, 18 February 1995
- Nikola Henze, "Stotternd zur Präzisierung eines Gedankens kommend" (Stuttering towards the precision of an idea), Potsdamer Morgenpost, 15 February 1995
