= Listed: Dispatches from America's Endangered Species Act =

2011 book by Joe Roman

- Hardcover, showing Florida panther.
- Author: Joe Roman
- Subject: Endangered Species
- Publisher: Harvard University Press
- Publication date: 2011
- Publication place: United States
- Media type: Print (hardcover)
- ISBN: 9780674047518

Listed: Dispatches from America's Endangered Species Act is a 2011 book by Joe Roman that explores the history of the Endangered Species Act and the relationship between biodiversity and human well being. Healthy ecosystems, such as mangroves and dunes, for example, can act as barriers to natural catastrophes. The book received the 2012 Rachel Carson Environment Book Award from the Society of Environmental Journalists.
