= Stephen T. Asma =

American academic (born 1966)

Stephen Asma in 2008 (photo by Brian Wingert)

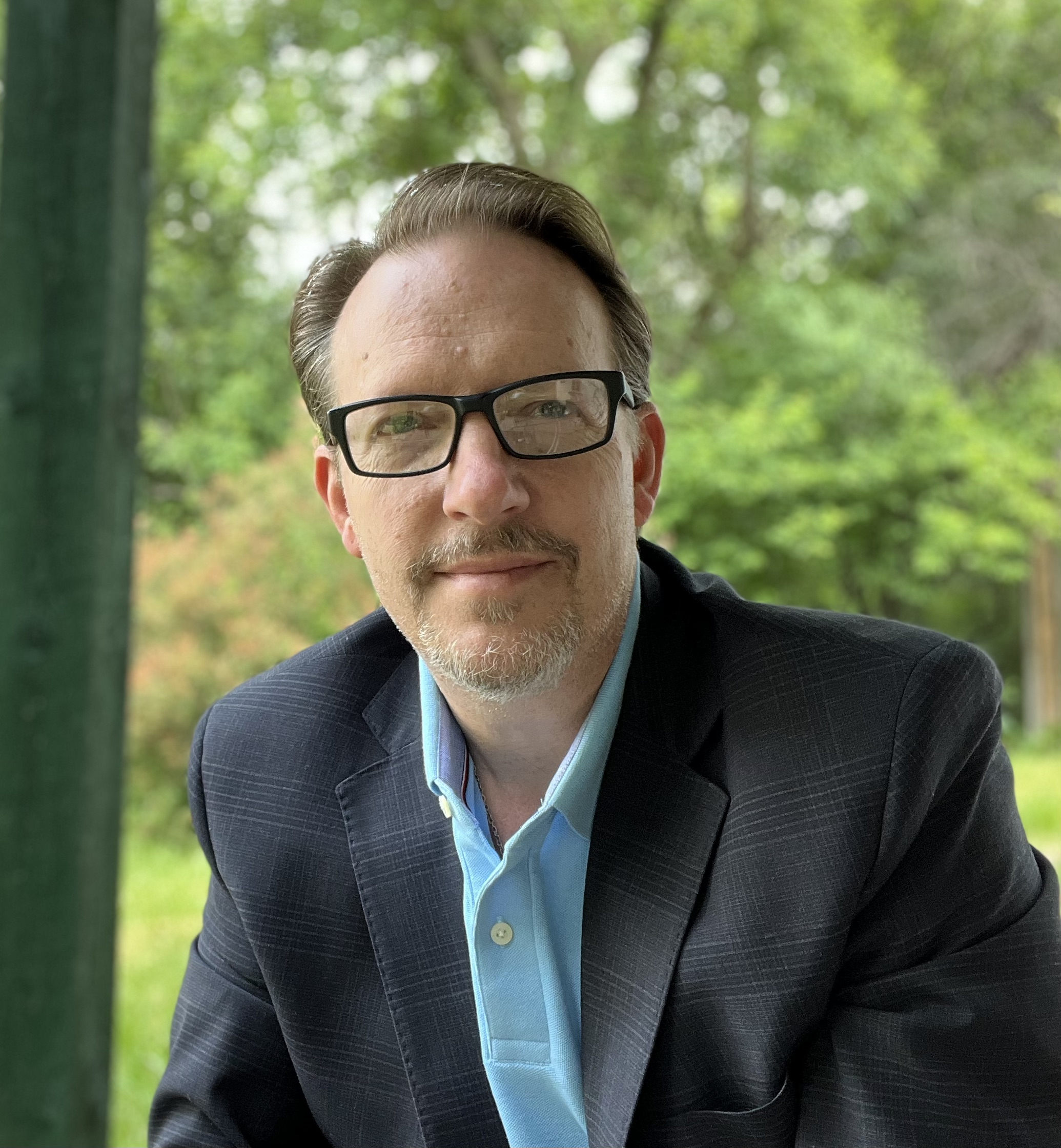
Stephen Asma in 2024 (photo from Columbia College Chicago website)

Stephen T. Asma (born 1966) is Professor of Philosophy and Distinguished Scholar at Columbia College Chicago. He is also a Senior Fellow of the Research Group in Mind, Science, and Culture at Columbia College Chicago.

He works on the philosophy of the life sciences, and the theme of religion and science (especially Buddhism and Christianity). He is considered an authority on the history and philosophy of monsters and horror. Additionally, he works on the philosophy of improvisation and imagination. Together with actor Paul Giamatti Asma has argued that Imagination is an under-appreciated "6th Sense" and form of embodied cognition. Asma was a Fulbright scholar in Beijing China in 2014. He writes regularly for The New York Times, The Stone, and various magazines.

Asma is a recipient of the Henry Luce Foundation grant, Public Theologies of Technology and Presence. He is exploring friendship and prosocial affect in the digital age.

Together with Paul Giamatti, Asma is co-host and executive producer of the podcast Chinwag.

== Personal life ==
Asma also plays music professionally, with various bands, playing blues or jazz. He played with Bo Diddley in the 1990s. He has also worked as a professional freelance illustrator.

== Publications ==
- Following Form and Function: A Philosophical Archaeology of Life Science. Studies in Phenomenology and Existential Philosophy. Northwestern University Press. 1996.
- Stuffed Animals and Pickled Heads: The Culture and Evolution of Natural History Museums. New York: Oxford University Press. 2001.
- The Gods Drink Whiskey: Stumbling Toward Enlightenment in the Land of the Tattered Buddha. San Francisco: Harper Collins. 2005. ISBN 9780060723958.
- On Monsters: An Unnatural History of Our Worst Fears. Oxford University Press. 2009.
- Buddha for Beginners. Writers and Readers Publishing Inc. 1996., Revised by Hampton Roads Publishing, 2009
- Why I am a Buddhist. Hampton Roads Publishing. 2010. ISBN 9781571746177.
- Against Fairness. Chicago: University of Chicago Press. 2013. ISBN 9780226029863.
- "The Myth of Universal Love". New York Times. January 5, 2013.
- Asma, Stephen T. (Winter 2014). "Monsters on the Brain: An Evolutionary Epistemology of Horror" (PDF). Social Research. 81 (4). Columbia University: 941–968. doi:10.1353/sor.2014.0055. S2CID 142435267.
- "Was Bo Diddley a Buddha?". New York Times. April 10, 2017.
- The Evolution of Imagination. University of Chicago Press. 2017.
- Why We Need Religion. Oxford University Press. 2018.
- The Emotional Mind: the affective roots of culture and cognition. Harvard University Press. 2019.
- "This Friendship Has Been Digitized". New York Times. March 23, 2019.
- "Ancient Animistic Beliefs Live On in Our Intimacy with Tech". Aeon. February 25, 2020.
- Asma, S. T. (August 30, 2022). "Imagination: A New Foundation for the Science of Mind". Biological Theory. 17 (4): 243–249. doi:10.1007/s13752-022-00410-4. PMC 9425790. PMID 36059434.
- The Alchemist's Thread: How the Secret History of Mysticism and Magic Helps Us Re-Enchant Our Lives. HarperCollins Publishers. 2027.
