= Prickly pears in South Africa =

Invasive cacti in South Africa

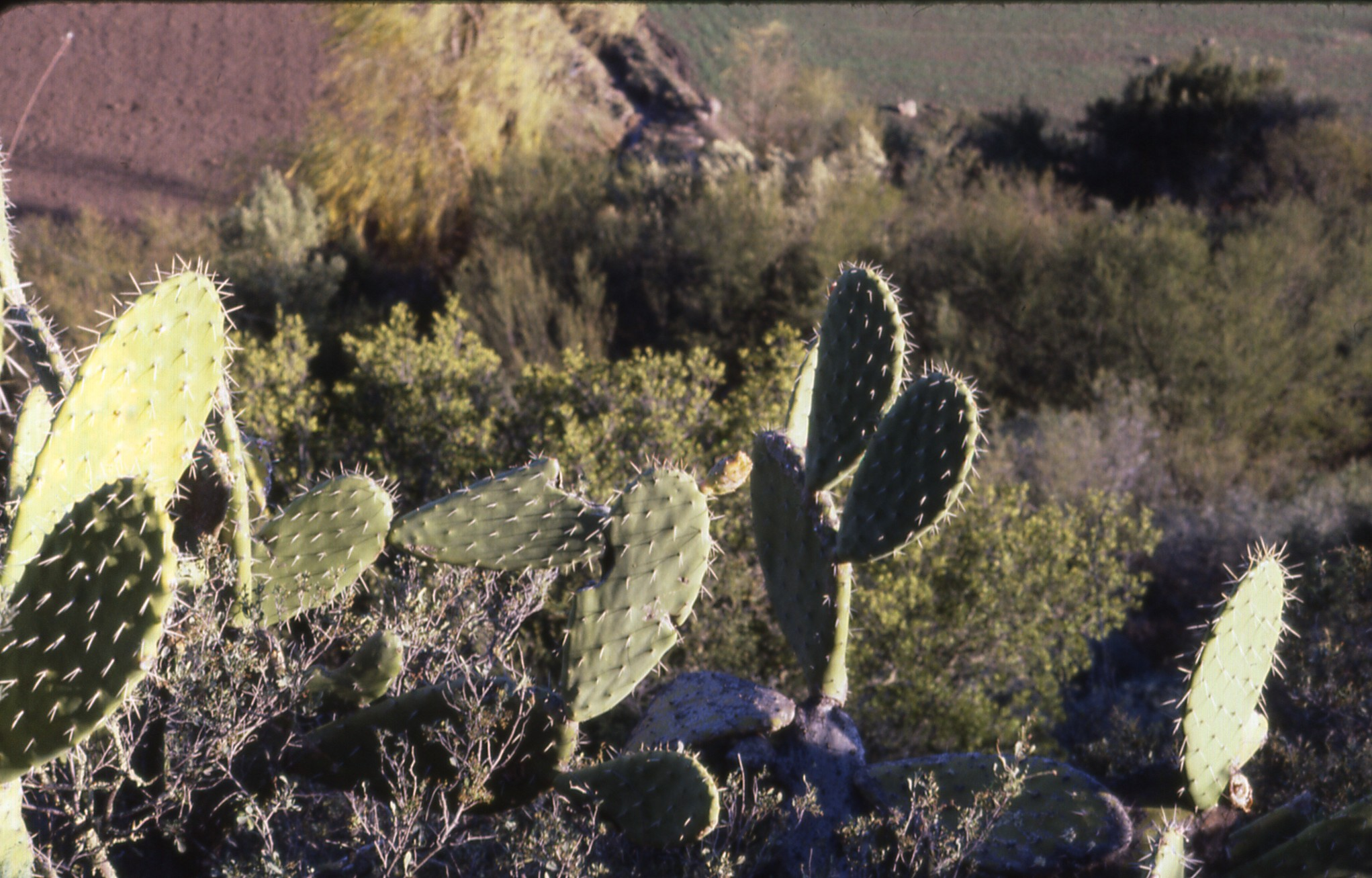
A photograph of prickly pears, taken in Boomplaas Cave, South Africa.

In South Africa, many species of Opuntia are considered highly invasive including O. aurantiaca, O. elata, O. engelmannii, O. ficus-indica, O. humifusa, O. leucotricha, O. microdasys, O. monacantha, O. pubescens, O. robusta, O. salmiana, O. spinulifera, O. stricta and O. tomentosa. These species are classified as Category 1 invaders, and targeted for national eradication; most activities with regards to the species are prohibited (such as importing, propagating, introducing, translocating or trading).

Opuntia ficus-indica (known as the prickly pear) is a plant that has been part of the landscape of South Africa for over 250 years.

== Arrival and spread ==
The prickly pear was brought to South Africa, from the Americas, in the mid-18th century. It was proposed to be used as a “living fence”, to separate and protect property but, in the Western Cape, it became, in effect, more of an interesting feature in gardens. When it established itself in the Eastern Cape and Karoo, it took control of the environment around it because of being drought resistant, able to reproduce without seeds as well as its “extensive seed dispersal”. It thrived in these regions, where the original vegetation had already been disturbed by settlers.

== Uses ==
Part of what facilitated the spread of the prickly pear was its utility. The plant was used by a variety of people: It has “been, at some time, of importance to white commercial farmers, farmworkers, African landholders and urban communities”. The fruit can be eaten or turned into jams, preserves, beers, wines and soaps and the leaves can be used as medication. In addition, prickly pear can be useful fodder, particularly during drought, when few other plants survive. Many of both black and white inhabitants of the areas in which the prickly pear was prominent came to rely on the plant as a useful asset to be eaten, prepared, sold or used as fodder and, consequently, there were groups of people who had a very positive attitude towards the plant, with one farmer of the time going so far as to say that “there is nothing better in this country”.

== Detrimental impacts ==
To many farmers and the colonial administration, the prickly pear was not seen as an asset, but as an invader, come to conquer farming land and drive white farmers into poverty. The plant could degrade the land to the extent where it could no longer be used for pastoral farming and could have a detrimental effect on stock. In addition, the plant was seen to have a negative effect on availability of labour as it “allowed blacks and poor whites to elude wage labour for half the year by harvesting and selling the fruit crop”, and the alcohol made from it was seen to make people “unfit for labour”. In addition, it was believed that thieves and vagrants could hide in the plants and live on their fruit.

It was also found that invasive Opuntia species have adverse effects on the beetle population in the Kruger National Park, and widespread invasions alter soil characteristics.

== Eradication ==
The above factors led some farmers to put pressure on the colonial administration to fund and make compulsory the eradication of the plant. The administration did not, however, because of objections from other farmers and the economic cost of such a project. They did decide to subsidize or fund farmers with arsenic to get rid of prickly pear on farmland. It cut down on the extensive labour – and, thus, high costs eradicating the plant. This was not particularly effective, and the effect which the arsenic had on land, labour and stock was often extremely detrimental. In the early 1930s, when the amount of prickly pear was at its height, the government garnered enough support to be able to launch the bio-control project. In 1932 biological control in the form of, particularly, the cochineal and phycitid moth, was introduced and was highly effective. It is largely due to this that, in 2002, there was a tenth of the number of prickly pear left when compared with the 1930s.

== Opinions on the prickly pear today ==
H.G. Zimmerman and V. C. Moran argue that, today, permission for such control would not have been given. This is because, with the plant largely under control, public perception of it has, by-and-large been positive. Now that the plant no longer poses as much of a threat and can be kept under control through insects and an injection of MSMA (monosodium methanearsonate), a herbicide which can target individual plants, increasing attention is being given to how the prickly pear can be cultivated and utilised. For fruit, jam, preserves, beer, wine, medicine, fodder and as a host to the cochineal which can be used to produce dye. According to scholars, W. Beinart and L. Wotshela, who interviewed African people in the Eastern Cape about prickly pear usage, much of the use of the prickly pear among African communities had declined by the 21st century (interviews were conducted in the early 2000s). But in some areas, beer production was still thriving in 2002, as was the trade and use of the plant for medicine.

With labour saving techniques and development of new products the plant could be further utilised, which can assist in economic development. In addition, “difficulties of bulk picking, and the nature of the wild fruit itself, have clearly resulted in some space being maintained for harvesting and informal marketing, especially by women” and, therefore, the plant can be particularly in useful in rural development and the economic empowerment of women.

== Bibliography ==
- Bienart, William; Wotshela, Luvuyo (2003). "Prickly pear in the Eastern Cape since the 1950s-perspectives from interviews". Kronos (29): 191–209. ISSN 0259-0190.
- van Sittert, Lance (2002-07-01). "'Our irrepressible fellow-colonist': the biological invasion of prickly pear (Opuntia ficus-indica) in the Eastern Cape c.1890–c.1910". Journal of Historical Geography. 28 (3): 397–419. doi:10.1006/jhge.2001.0457. ISSN 0305-7488.
- Zimmermann, H. G.; Moran, V. C. (1991-10-01). "Biological control of prickly pear, Opuntia ficusindica (Cactaceae), in South Africa". Agriculture, Ecosystems & Environment. 37 (1): 29–35. doi:10.1016/0167-8809(91)90137-M. ISSN 0167-8809.
