= Shadab Zeest Hashmi =

Pakistani-American poet (born 1972)

Shadab Zeest Hashmi (born August 16, 1972) is an American poet of Pakistani origins. Her poetry, written in English, has been translated into Spanish and Urdu. She has been the editor of the Magee Park Poets Anthology and MahMag and is a columnist for 3 Quarks Daily. Many of Hashmi's poems explore feminism, history and perspectives on Islam.

== Biography ==
Shadab Zeest Hashmi grew up in Peshawar, Pakistan. She graduated from Reed College in 1995 and received her MFA from Warren Wilson College. Her poetry has appeared in Prairie Schooner, Poetry International, Vallum, Atlanta Review, Nimrod, The Bitter Oleander, Journal of Postcolonial Writings, The Cortland Review, The Adirondack Review, New Millennium Writings, Universe: A United Nations of Poets, Drunken Boat, Split this Rock, Hubbub, Pakistani Literature Women Writings and others.

Shadab Zeest Hashmi's essays on eastern poetic forms such as the ghazal and qasida have been published in the Journal of Contemporary World Literature, and her essays have appeared in the Washington Post, Pakistaniaat: A Journal of Pakistan Studies, Knot magazine, and "3 Quarks Daily" In 2010, Poetic Matrix Press published Shadab Zeest Hashmi's book Baker of Tarifa, which won the 2011 San Diego Book Award for poetry.

Baker of Tarifa is a book of poems based on the history of Muslim Spain; it attempts to recreate a near millennium of Andalusi culture which transformed Western thought, values, art science and technology, building a legend of peaceful co-existence known as "la convivencia". The work looks at Muslim Civilization as a bridge between antiquity and modernity, East and West, between three continents (Africa, Asia, and Europe) and three religions (Judaism, Christianity, and Islam); a golden chapter not only in Muslim and European history, but human history. Shadab Zeest Hashmi has been inspired by the music of the Al-Andalus Ensemble.

Eleanor Wilner called Hashmi's poems "luminous." Shadab's latest book is Kohl & Chalk, which uses themes from her own life as a naturalized American citizen, while also remembering her home in Pakistan.

== Works ==
Published Essays:

- Qasida
- Ghazal
- Memoir Essay
- Essay
- Review
- Ghazal, Sufism and the Birth of a Language
- "Saying" the Ghazal: Duende and Performing the Courtly Art of the Ghazal

Poems:

- "Sultana Morayma: the Last Queen of al-Andalus", Mizna, Summer '16 Issue, Volume 17.1 p. 57 ISSN 1535-2331
- "Across the Windowsill", San Diego Museum of Art
- "Iman", San Diego Reader
- "Passing through Peshawar"
- "It’s Your Marmalade House"
- "Guantanamo"

Books:

- Kohl & Chalk (Poetic Matrix Press: January 25, 2013). ISBN 978-0985288396
- Baker of Tarifa (Poetic Matrix Press: September 1, 2010). ISBN 978-0-982-73434-6

== Awards ==
- 1991 — SAARC medal for literature,
- 2004 — Stout Award,
- 2007 — Andalusia Prize for Literature,
- 2011 — San Diego Book Award,
- 2014 — Nazim Hikmet Poetry Prize,
- 2014 — San Diego Book Award
