= Joe Roman =

American biologist

- Education: Harvard University; University of Florida
- Scientific career
- Fields: Conservation biology
- Workplaces: University of Vermont

Joe Roman is a conservation biologist, marine ecologist, and author of the books Whale, Listed: Dispatches from America's Endangered Species Act, and Eat, Poop, Die: How Animals Make Our World. His conservation research includes studies of the historical population size of whales, the role of cetaceans in the nitrogen cycle, the relationship between biodiversity and disease, and the genetics of invasions. He is the founding editor of "Eat the Invaders", a website dedicated to controlling invasive species by eating them.

Roman is a Fellow at the Gund Institute for Environment at the University of Vermont. He earned an AB with Honors in Visual and Environmental Studies from Harvard University in 1985 and an MA in wildlife ecology and conservation from the University of Florida. Roman was awarded his PhD from Harvard's Department of Organismic and Evolutionary Biology in 2003; his dissertation was titled Tracking Anthropogenic Change in the North Atlantic Ocean with Genetic Tools. During his PhD, he co-authored, with Stephen Palumbi, a paper for the journal Science that presented evidence that whale populations had been considerably larger prior to whaling than had previously been thought. By 2009, he was working with the Gund Institute with a Science and Technology Policy Fellowship from the American Association for the Advancement of Science, and also beginning a collaboration with the United States Environmental Protection Agency looking at loss of biodiversity. He had a Fulbright Fellowship at the Universidade Federal de Santa Catarina in Brazil in 2012, and he was the 2014–15 Sarah and Daniel Hrdy Visiting Fellow in Conservation Biology at Harvard. Born in Queens, New York, Roman lives in Vermont.

== Books ==
- Eat, Poop, Die: How Animals Make Our World (2023, Little, Brown Spark)
- Listed: Dispatches from America's Endangered Species Act (2011, Harvard University Press)
- Whale (2006, Reaktion Books)

His book Listed won the 2012 Rachel Carson Environment Book Award from the Society of Environmental Journalists.

== Journal articles ==
- Roman, Joe (2023). "Surtsey at 60". Science. 382: 1004. doi:10.1126/science.adl6569.
- Roman, Joe; Kraska, James (2016). "Reboot Gitmo for U.S.–Cuba research diplomacy" (PDF). Science. 351 (6279): 1258–1260. Bibcode:2016Sci...351.1258R. doi:10.1126/science.aad4247. PMID 26989232. S2CID 206643277.
- Roman, J.; Altman, I.; Dunphy-Daly, M.; Campbell, C.; Jasny, M.; Read, A. (2013). "The Marine Mammal Protection Act at 40: Status, recovery, and future of U.S. marine mammals". Annals of the New York Academy of Sciences. 1286: 29–49. doi:10.1111/nyas.12040.
- Blakeslee, A. M. H.; McKenzie, C. H.; Darling, J. A.; Byers, J. E.; Pringle, J. M.; Roman, J. (2010). "A hitchhiker's guide to the Maritimes: Anthropogenic transport facilitates long-distance dispersal of an invasive marine crab to Newfoundland". Diversity and Distributions. 16 (6): 879–891. doi:10.1111/j.1472-4642.2010.00703.x. S2CID 86012925.
- Echelle, A. A.; Hackler, J. C.; Lack, J. B.; Ballard, S. R.; Roman, J.; Fox, S. F.; Leslie, D. M.; Van Den Bussche, R. A. (2010). "Conservation genetics of the alligator snapping turtle: cytonuclear evidence of range-wide bottleneck effects and unusually pronounced geographic structure". Conservation Genetics. 11 (4): 1375–1387. doi:10.1007/s10592-009-9966-1. S2CID 300812.
- Roman, Joe; Darling, John A. (2007). "Paradox Lost: Genetic Diversity and the Success of Aquatic Invasions". Trends in Ecology and Evolution. 22 (9): 454–464. doi:10.1016/j.tree.2007.07.002. PMID 17673331.
- Rocha, L. A.; Robertson, D. R.; Roman, J.; Bowen, B. W. (2005). "Ecological speciation in tropical reef fishes". Proceedings of the Royal Society B: Biological Sciences. 272 (1563): 573–579. doi:10.1098/2004.3005. PMC 1564072. PMID 15817431.
- Roman, Joseph; Santhuff, Steven D.; Moler, Paul E.; Bowen, Brian W. (1999). "Population structure and cryptic evolutionary units in the alligator snapping turtle" (PDF). Conservation Biology. 13 (1): 135–142. doi:10.1046/j.1523-1739.1999.98007.x. S2CID 53445937.

== Popular articles ==
- "America's New Whale Is Now at Extinction's Doorstep." The New York Times, March 6, 2021.
- "Vulnerable Species in the Crosshairs," with Ya-Wei Li, The New York Times, July 26, 2018.
- "Can the Plover Save New York?" Slate, August 23, 2013.
- "Sharks Help Maintain Health of the Oceans," Wall Street Journal, September 20, 2005.
- "Where Bright Lights and Night Life Are Nature's Doing." The Sunday New York Times, March 6, 2005.
- "A Place Where All the Snowflakes Are Still Different." The New York Times, January 2, 2004.
