= Rubenstein School of Environment and Natural Resources =

College at the University of Vermont

Coordinates: 44.47595°N 73.19513°W

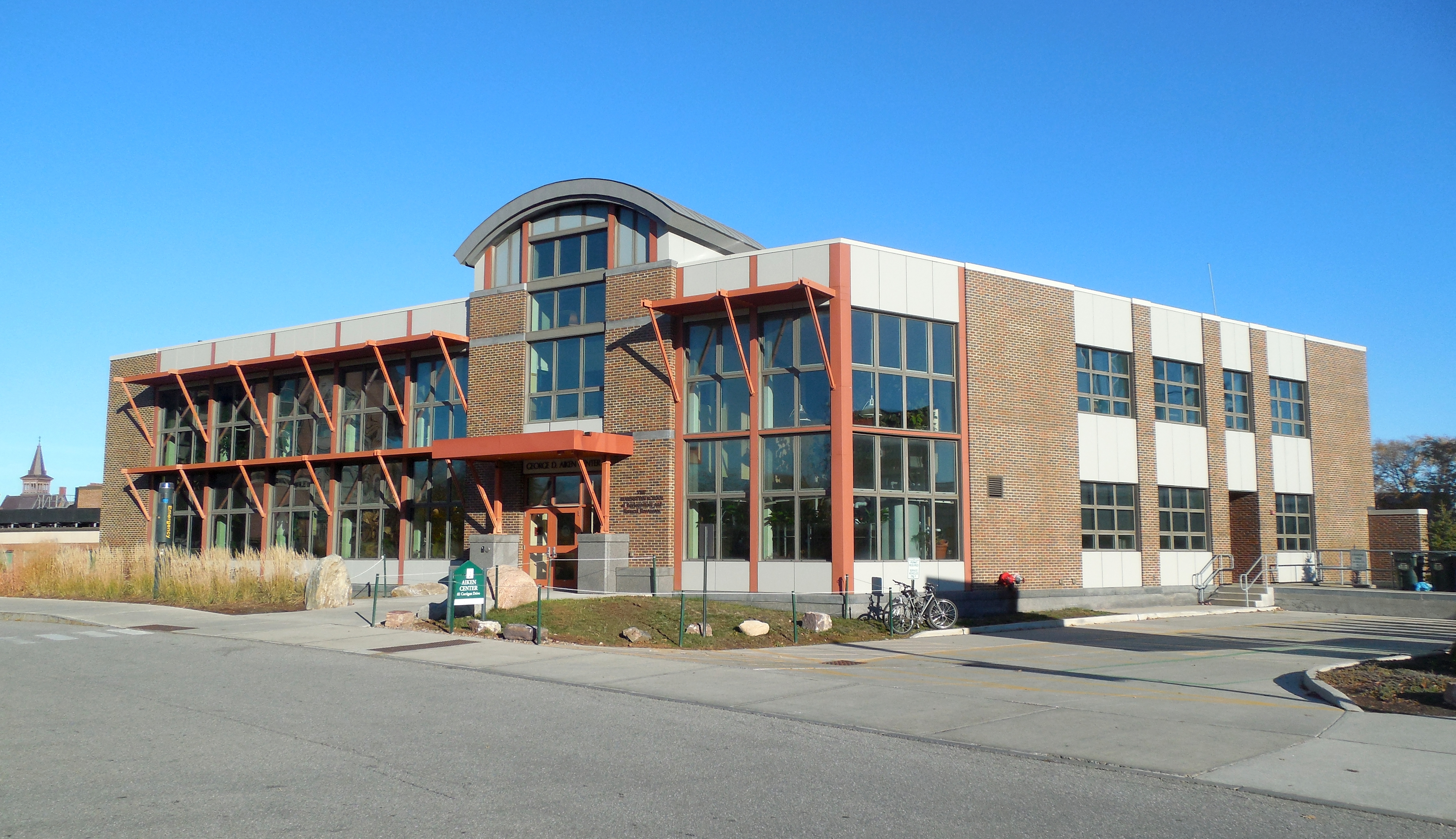
The George D. Aiken Center houses the Rubenstein School of Environment and Natural Resources

The Rubenstein School of Environment and Natural Resources (RSENR) (established in 2003) is the University of Vermont's natural resources college. The University of Vermont recognized the importance of providing educational opportunities in this field of study, initiating forestry courses in 1888. The first school, originally called The School of Natural Resources was established in 1973. The main home of the Rubenstein School of Environment and Natural Resources, the George D. Aiken Center opened in 1982. The building's name honors Vermont's distinguished late senator and governor.

RSENR is home to a natural resources and field study based curriculum, has its own core courses and building. There are several majors including environmental sciences; forestry; parks, recreation, and tourism; sustainability, ecology, and policy; and wildlife and fisheries biology.

The Rubenstein School campus includes members of the UVM Environmental Program, the Gund Institute for Ecological Economics, the Rubenstein Ecosystem Science Laboratory, and the US Forest Service Northern Research Station.

In 2012, the Aiken building housing the school was completely reconstructed as a green renovated facility and named the Aiken Center with a U.S. Green Building Council LEED certification of platinum, and has the highest certification score in the entire state of Vermont. One of the other facilities belonging to the school is the Rubenstein Ecosystem Research Lab at the Burlington waterfront.
