= Dennis C. Pirages =

Dennis Clark Pirages (July 30, 1942 – October 1, 2020) is an American political scientist, environmentalist and former Harrison Professor of International Environmental Politics at the University of Maryland, College Park, known for his work on the environment and sustainability questions.

== Biography ==
Born in Davenport, Iowa, Pirages obtained his BA from the State University of Iowa in 1964, and his PhD from Stanford University in 1969.

In 1975 Pirages was appointed Professor at the University of Maryland. In those days he had come into prominence after co-authoring the ARK II: Social Response to Environmental Imperatives with Paul R. Ehrlich, which was published in 1974. In the late 1970s he contributed to The Global 2000 Report to the President, directed by Gerald O. Barney, and published in 1980. In the late 1990s Pirages also served as director of the Harrison Center on the Future Global Agenda at the University of Maryland.

Until the early 2010s Pirages continued to serve as Professor Government and Politics at the College of Behavioral and Social Sciences at the University of Maryland, College Park. Around 2007 he had also started working at the Department of Political Science, University of Nevada, Las Vegas. In 1988 Pirages has been elected lifetime fellow of the American Association for Advancement of Science.

== Work ==
Pirages is known for his political work on the environment, which according to Kassiola (1990), has long been a neglected field in political science. Notable exceptions however are William Ophuls, Lester W. Milbrath, Lynton K. Caldwell, Harold and Margaret Sprout, and Pirages, who all wrote extensively on the environment.

=== Society for Optimum Sustainability (S.O.S.) ===
In the year 1973–1974, Pirages took part of discussions around Nicholas Georgescu-Roegen, with Kenneth Boulding, Herman Daly and Robert Heilbroner to create a society "which Boulding tentatively called Society for Optimum Sustainability (S.O.S.)." Levallois (2010) summarized, that:

"...Georgescu-Roegen argued that their envisioned society (which he would prefer to call the Bioeconomic Society, or else the Society for Environmental Economics, S.E.E.) should develop strong ties with the American Economic Association, because In the last analysis, our ulterior aim should be to make AEA SEE..."

These plans however faltered in 1974.

=== Dominant social paradigm (DSP) ===
In their 1974 book, entitled Ark II, Pirages and Paul R. Ehrlich contributed to the theory of social perception, and coined the term "dominant social paradigm" (DSP). This concept was defined as "a mental image of social reality that guides expectations in a society."

Pirages and Ehrlich (1974) further explained:

"... A DSP is the socially relevant part of a total culture. Different societies have different DSPs. A social paradigm is important to society because it helps make sense of an otherwise incomprehensible universe and to make organized activity possible. It is an essential part of the cultural information that is passed from generation to generation as it guides the behavior and expectations of those born into it. The world view of each individual is somewhat different from that of every other, as are the shared world views of members of different families, classes, and so forth."

Pirages and Ehrlich (1974) conclude, that dominant social paradigm "even within a single industrial nation, must be considered as the common content of the paradigms shared by most individuals, although it does not, of course, encompass all views of all citizens."

=== The Sustainable Society ===
In the 1977 publication, The Sustainable Society: Implications for Limited Growth, edited by Pirages, he also published the article "A social design for sustainable growth." In this work Pirages gave one of the first definitions of sustainable growth, the sustainable society and its connection. Pirages (1977;10) started, that:

"Sustainable growth is a difficult concept with which to deal, but it seems to be the best guide to the future that we have at present. It means economic growth that can be supported by physical and social environments for the foreseeable future. An ideal sustainable society would be one in which all energy would be derived from current solar income and all nonrenewable resources would be recycled."

Around the same time Robert L. Stivers had also published a pioneering work on the sustainable society. Another notable definition of the sustainable society was given by James C. Coomer Coomer (1979) described the sustainable society as a society "that lives within the self-perpetuating limits of its environment." According to Faber et al (2005) both perceptions of a sustainable society are static, and have the shortcoming that they don't take into account possible changes of the physical and social environments.

=== World views ===
Prager (1990) argued that Pirages contributed with a different world view. Prager summarized, that:

"... Pirages has written extensively on the underlying bases of this current age. His work has been among the most important published in the political/ environmental field. Pirages has analyzed, as part of an overall understanding of environmental threat and challenge, the impact that dominant scientific paradigms exert in contemporary society. The concept of differing world views assumes a prominent place in his thinking."

According to Pirages (1989)

The atypical four-hundred-year stretch of recent history dominated by the industrial revolution has given rise to a culture or predominant world view that could best be called exclusionist. This world view permeates social life and consciousness as well as academic enterprise in the industrial world. It is manifest in the beliefs that human beings exist apart from nature and that they are destined to dominate it, that the last four hundred years of growth and progress will be followed by a similar stretch of good fortune."

== Selected publications ==
- Dennis Clark Pirages, Paul R. Ehrlich, ARK II: Social Response to Environmental Imperatives. 1974.
- Dennis C. Pirages, Sustainable society: implications for limited growth. 16 papers, 1977.
- Dennis Pirages (ed.), Building Sustainable Societies: a blueprint for a post-industrial world., M. E. Sharpe, 1996.
- Dennis Pirages; Theresa Manley DeGeest (2004). Ecological Security: An Evolutionary Perspective on Globalization. Rowman & Littlefield
- Dennis Pirages, Farooq Sobhan, Stacy D. VanDeveer and Li Li. Ecological and Nontraditional Security Challenges in South Asia. June 2011.
