= Gerald Barney =

Gerald Barney may refer to:

- Gerry Barney (born 1939), British graphic designer, best known for designing the British Rail Double Arrow
- Gerald O. Barney (1937–2020), American physicist and expert in the field of sustainable development
