= Stivers =

Stivers may refer to

- Terri Stivers, a fictional character in Homicide: Life on the Street
- Stivers School for the Arts, Dayton, Ohio, U.S.

== People with the surname ==
- Ben Stivers (born 1968), American piano, organ, and keyboard player
- Camilla Stivers (born 1938), American public administration scholar
- Don Stivers (1926–2009), American artist
- George William Stivers (1920–1945), American soldier
- Gregory N. Stivers (born 1960), American judge
- Herbert Lee Stivers (1926–2018), American soldier and prison guard
- John D. Stivers (1861–1935), American newspaper publisher and politician
- Moses D. Stivers (1828–1895), American politician
- Robert Stivers (born 1961), American politician
- Robert Stivers (photographer) (born 1953), American photographer
- Robert L. Stivers (born 1940), American theologian
- Skippy Stivers, American college football and baseball player
- Steve Stivers (born 1965), American politician
- Thomas W. Stivers (1850–1877), American soldier

== See also ==
- Stiver, currency
