= Bonaiuti =

Bonaiuti is an Italian surname. Notable people with the surname include:

- Adriano Bonaiuti (born 1967), Italian footballer
- Baldassarre Bonaiuti (1336–1385), Italian historian and politician
- Mauro Bonaiuti, Italian economist
