= Global 2000 =

Global 2000 may refer to:

- Forbes Global 2000, an annual ranking of the top 2000 public companies in the world by Forbes magazine.
- The Global 2000 Report to the President, commissioned by President Jimmy Carter to make projections for the future based on trends for the upcoming decades.
- Global 2000 (Austria), affiliate of Friends of the Earth Europe
