= Robert L. Stivers =

American theologian, environmentalist

Robert L. Stivers (born 1940) is an American theologian, environmentalist, and Professor Emeritus of Ethics at Pacific Lutheran University, Tacoma, Washington, known for his early works of environmental ethics and sustainable development. and as "long-time advocate of Presbyterian ecojustice concerns."

== Biography ==
Born in 1940 in Cincinnati, Stivers graduated from Yale University, and served as Officer in the US Navy. Afterwards he continued his studies and obtained his M. Div. from the Union Theological Seminary in 1969, along with a Travelling Fellowship. In 1973 he obtained his PhD from Columbia University.

After graduation in 1973 Stivers joined the Pacific Lutheran University, where he served as teacher for 37 years at the Department of Religion. After some years as associate professor of religion, he was appointed Professor of Religion. At his retirement in 2009 he was appointed Professor Emeritus of Ethics.

In the 1970s and 1980s Stivers wrote two book The Sustainable Society: Ethics and Economic Growth. (1976), and Hunger Technology and Limits to Growth (1984), in which he commented the 1972 publication The Limits to Growth.

== Work ==
=== The Sustainable Society, 1976 ===
In his 1976 book, entitled The Sustainable Society: Ethics and Economic Growth, Stivers describes the advocates of economic growth in his days and their critics. As a theologian his main focus is on the ethical aspects, and not so much on the scientific data behind the theories.

In his days Stivers' work was one of several work exploring ethics in economics and society. Other notable works were Amartya Sen's On Ethics and Economics from 1987, and Robert R. Chambers' Political Theory and Societal Ethics from 1992.

==== Aim of the study ====
In a 1979 review of The Sustainable Society in the Review of Religious Research Stivers gave a summary of the work and its aim:

"The "limits to growth debate" has opened several new and potentially creative avenues for research and policy. This study explores one of these avenues, the vision of The Sustainable Society - a vision of an economy sustainable indefinitely in terms of resources and population, a new political system, and a new ethic. The third dimension, the new ethic, is the focus of attention. The need for visions is discussed, a theological foundation for the new ethic is suggested and six guidelines are derived. The guidelines provide the basis for critical and constructive comments on present and future social arrangements. The study concludes with an outline of the most significant implications for social and religious research."

In this review Stivers explained that the implications of The Sustainable Society are dramatic:

"As for public policy, steps to encourage durability, recycling, and conservation should be taken immediately. We may not have the luxury of waiting until the price systems make these activities attractive. For the longer range, assuming that technological innovations do not extend limits indefinitely, conservation now makes sense."

==== Context ====
Kubo (1977) described the context of The Sustainable Society, as follows:

"When economic growth becomes the primary social goal, the needs of people and of nature are neglected. Growth must not be the ultimate goal but the means of fulfilling men's needs by equitable distribution of its benefits and by preserving a livable environment for them. The debate between undifferentiated growth and differentiated growth is academic if the futurists are correct in asserting that there are limits to growth because there are limits to the world's natural resources. But some are more sanguine; they feel that technological advances will be able to cope with the problems of the future, create new resources, increase the food supply, and clean up the environment. These advocates of growth see no reason to be alarmed and press on, full steam ahead. The author sides with the futurists and opts for differentiated growth..."

And furthermore:

"...To be successful this strategy involves, however, a global view, immediate action, worldwide cooperation, a long-range perspective, and balanced economic development among the world's regions dealing with economic, environmental, and population problems with serious political implications. It cannot succeed if some nations cooperate and others do not. This means that there must be willing cooperation or else coercion. Besides, a new world view is demanded which has an appreciation for nature, a renouncing of the religion of growth, a reassessment of our attitudes toward work, consumption, and abundance, cooperation instead of conflict, emphasis on quality, ends, values, and concern for future generations. No less than the radical conversion of mankind is demanded. Immediate personal gains must be sacrificed for future benefits for all, selfishness must be changed to unselfishness, war by the strong nations as a means of obtaining resources must be given up for cooperation and sharing with the have-nots. According to the author, in the face of these obstacles, while no optimism is called for neither is pessimism but a realism that trusts in God's love for hope."

It is Stivers' conviction, according to Kubo (1977), that "in the face of these obstacles, while no optimism is called for neither is pessimism but a realism that trusts in God's love for hope." Stivers himself argued (1976)

"... persons will undergo great discomfort, frustration, and discontinuity quite willingly if a crisis is perceived and there is a sense of working toward some meaningful end... God's love and our response will provide the resources to overcome the forces of destruction even in the most threatening situations."

==== Equilibrium economy and sustainable society ====
In the late 1970s the concept of the "sustainable society" was developed in the works of Dennis C. Pirages (1977) and James C. Coomer (1979) Stivers preceded them in using the phrase "sustainable society." He introduced this term in the context of the required societal re-ordering as he argued (1977; 186-7):

"Whatever we call the reordering, it will necessarily have economic, political, and ethical components. Perhaps the term “sustainable society” best conveys the overall reordering, while “equilibrium economy” is best used to refer only to the economic component. Thus we have the whole, the sustainable society, requiring an equilibrium economy; a globally oriented, yet decentralized, political system; and a new world view."

About the "equilibrium economy" or "steady-state economy" Stivers further argued:

"...it would be an economy in which population and annual product would be
(1) sustainable indefinitely without sudden and uncontrollable collapse and
(2) capable of meeting the basic material needs of all people.
Such an economy would necessarily be in equilibrium with basic ecological support systems and would minimize..."

According to Professor of Urban Design and Sustainability Stephen M. Wheeler (2013) Stivers didn't coined the term "sustainable society," but a 1974 conference of the World Council of Churches issued that concept. Stivers did publish the first book with the term "sustainable" in the title.

==== Zero Population Growth and Zero Economic Growth ====
Another remarkable aspect of The Sustainable Society, was that Stivers advocated zero population growth, a condition of demographic balance where the number of people in a specified population neither grows nor declines, considered as a social aim by some.

In doing so Stivers followed a trend set by Paul Ehrlich and Barry Commoner. But Stivers also argued for zero economic growth.

==== A new world view ====
In order to work towards solving the problems at hand, Stivers acknowledge the need of three elements: technological innovation, political change and third element. Stivers explained:

"There must be a crucial third component, a new world view involving a radical change of attitudes and values, before the sustainable society will become a reality."

In those days Ian Barbour came to a similar conclusion on this matter, and stated that "only a major change in attitudes and values, a new definition of good life, could permanently alter the burden we place on global resources."

==== Further research ====
One of Stivers' conclusions is, that more research is needed in n broad field for many different participants. In his 1979 review he explained:

"At the most general level, considerably more research is necessary in the three main dimensions of The Sustainable Society. For example, very little work has been done on the implications of the equilibrium economy. What sort of economic institutions will be required? How could we manage long-range sustainability? What will be the role of the price mechanism? What economic incentives might we develop to encourage durability and recycling?"

Economists in those days, such as Herman Daly, already went down this road. For political scientists and sociologists, according to Stivers (1979), there are "the vexing problems of managing this society and assessing the relative merits of centralized versus decentralized institutions." And finally, according to Stivers, there was the "task of thinking through the ideological implications falls to everyone, but especially to philosophers, theologians, and poets."

=== The ongoing limits to growth debate ===
In the course of the 1970s the publications of the Limits to growth by the Club of Rome early 1970s was followed by subsequent reports. Some scientists, like Herman Kahn with his 1976 book The next 200 Years: a scenario for America and the world, responded with extreme technological optimism. With the popularization in the media tons of books followed on the subject, while the 1973 oil crisis showed the world its dark side. About the ongoing debate Stivers (1979) summarized:

"For many, the debate has deadlocked over the issue of technology. On the one hand, the so-called optimists like Kahn (1976) assume that the technological process will continue to transcend physical limits well into the future, or at least to the point where, when reached, we will have achieved an exceedingly high level of sustainable consumption. On the other hand, the so-called pessimists like Meadows and his associates (Meadows et ah, 1972; also see Mesarovic and Pestel, 1974) claim not only that there are limits to resources, energy, and pollution absorption capacity, but also that the technological process itself suffers from severe limitations."

It is Stivers opinion that "The two sides talk past each other, insulated by opposing values and different assumptions regarding the efficacy of technology and the plasticity of human nature. Close observers are frustrated by the degree to which supposedly factual questions (e.g., the quantities of certain resources and the probability of new technological innovations) are being answered on the basis of socially located values and metaphysical assumptions."

== Reception ==
Back in the 1970s, in the book review on The Sustainable Society Kubo (1977) concluded that "the author throughout has been quite fair in presenting opposing views and has not withheld anything in portraying the bleak future regarding the limits to growth and all the concomitant problems in dealing with the possibility of developing a sustainable society."

Kubo finished with the words, that Stivers had done that so well that for Kubo "a realistic assessment can only be a pessimistic one. Here and there and from time to time there may be some cooperation and long-range strategies, but these will appear to be band-aid treatment when major surgery is called for. Selfish man will not even in the face of extinction alter his basic nature. It remains to be seen whether a sustainable society can be realized."

Recently, Stivers’ The Sustainable Society: Ethics and Economic Growth (1976) and Dennis Pirages’ edited collection, The Sustainable Society: Implications for Limited Growth (1977) are credited for introducing the term "sustainable society" to the general audience. According to Glasser (2016) both works "expanded on the theme of planetary limits to economic growth and explored the forms of social design and institutional change that are necessary to sustain meaningful improvements in quality of life."

== Selected publications ==
- Stivers, R. 1976. The Sustainable Society: Ethics and Economic Growth. Philadelphia: Westminster Press.
- Stivers, Robert L. Hunger Technology and Limits to Growth. Augsburg Publishing House, 1984.
- Stivers, Robert L. Reformed faith and economics. Univ Pr of Amer, 1989.
- Robert L. Stivers. Christian Ethics: A Case Method Approach, Orbis Books, 1994
- Martin-Schramm, James B., and Robert L. Stivers. Christian Environmental Ethics: A Case Method Approach. (2003).

Articles, a selection

- Robert L. Stivers. "Deciding on a Christian Life Style," Christian Century, December 17, 1980, pp. 1244-1288.
- Robert L. Stivers. "Globalization and the Environment," Presbyterian Mission Agency, 2003.
