= Nicholas Georgescu-Roegen =

Romanian mathematician, statistician and economist (1906–1994)

- Nicolae Georgescu
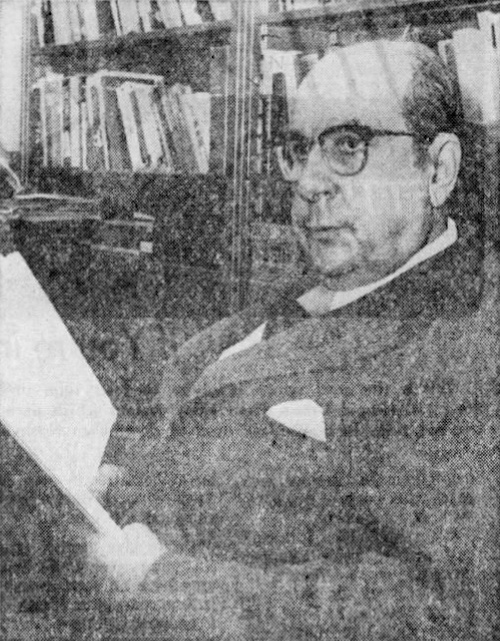
- Nicholas Georgescu-Roegen as he appears in a 1974 newspaper
- Born: 4 February 1906; Constanța, Romania
- Died: 30 October 1994 (aged 88); Nashville, Tennessee, United States
- Resting place: Bellu Cemetery, Bucharest
- Education: University of Bucharest, Paris Institute of Statistics, University College London
- Known for: Utility theory, consumer choice theory, production theory, biophysical economics, ecological economics
- Spouse: Otilia Busuioc
- Awards: The Harvie Branscomb Award
- Scientific career
- Fields: Economics, mathematics, statistics
- Workplaces: University of Bucharest ^{(1932–46)}, Harvard University ^{(1934–36)}, Vanderbilt University ^{(1950–76)}, Geneva Graduate Institute ^{(1974)}, University of Strasbourg ^{(1977–78)}
- Academic advisors: Traian Lalescu, Émile Borel, Karl Pearson, Joseph Schumpeter
- Doctoral students: Herman Daly, Kozo Mayumi
- Other notable students: Muhammad Yunus

Nicholas Georgescu-Roegen (born Nicolae Georgescu, 4 February 1906 – 30 October 1994) was a Romanian mathematician, statistician and economist. He is best known today for his 1971 magnum opus The Entropy Law and the Economic Process, in which he argued that all natural resources are irreversibly degraded when put to use in economic activity. A progenitor and a paradigm founder in economics, Georgescu-Roegen's work was decisive for the establishing of ecological economics as an independent academic sub-discipline in economics.

In the history of economic thought, Georgescu-Roegen was the first economist of some standing to theorise on the premise that all of earth's mineral resources will eventually be exhausted at some indeterminate future point. In his paradigmatic magnum opus, Georgescu-Roegen argues that economic scarcity is rooted in physical reality; that all natural resources are irreversibly degraded when put to use in economic activity; that the carrying capacity of earth – that is, earth's capacity to sustain human populations and consumption levels – is bound to decrease sometime in the future as earth's finite stock of mineral resources is being extracted and put to use; and consequently, that the world economy as a whole is heading towards an inevitable future collapse, ultimately bringing about human extinction. Due to the radical pessimism inherent to his work, based on the physical concept of entropy, the theoretical position of Georgescu-Roegen and his followers was later termed 'entropy pessimism'.

Georgescu-Roegen graduated from Sorbonne University in 1930 with a PhD in mathematical statistics with the highest honors. Early in his life, Georgescu-Roegen was the student and protégé of Joseph Schumpeter, who taught that irreversible evolutionary change and 'creative destruction' are inherent to capitalism. Later in life, Georgescu-Roegen was the teacher and mentor of Herman Daly, who then went on to develop the concept of a steady-state economy to impose permanent government restrictions on the flow of natural resources through the (world) economy.

As he brought natural resource flows into economic modelling and analysis, Georgescu-Roegen's work was decisive for the establishing of ecological economics as an independent academic sub-discipline in economics in the 1980s. In addition, the degrowth movement that formed in France and Italy in the early-2000s recognises Georgescu-Roegen as the main intellectual figure influencing the movement. Taken together, by the 2010s Georgescu-Roegen had educated, influenced and inspired at least three generations of people, including his contemporary peers, younger ecological economists, still younger degrowth organisers and activists, and others throughout the world.

Several economists have hailed Georgescu-Roegen as a man who lived well ahead of his time, and some historians of economic thought have proclaimed the ingenuity of his work. In spite of such appreciation, Georgescu-Roegen was never awarded the Nobel Prize in Economics, although benefactors from his native Romania were lobbying for it on his behalf. After Georgescu-Roegen's death, his work was praised by a surviving friend of the highest rank: Prominent Keynesian economist and Nobel Prize laureate Paul Samuelson professed that he would be delighted if the fame Georgescu-Roegen did not fully realise in his own lifetime were granted by posterity instead.

The inability or reluctance of most mainstream economists to recognise Georgescu-Roegen's work has been ascribed to the fact that much of his work reads like applied physics rather than economics, as this latter subject is generally taught and understood today.

Georgescu-Roegen's work was blemished somewhat by mistakes caused by his insufficient understanding of the physical science of thermodynamics. These mistakes have since generated some controversy, involving both physicists and ecological economists.

== Life and career ==
Nicolae Georgescu was born in Constanța, Romania in 1906. His father, of Greek descent, was an army officer, and his mother, an ethnic Romanian, was a sewing teacher at a girls school. After having lost his position in the army for disciplinary reasons, his father died when Nicolae was only eight years old.

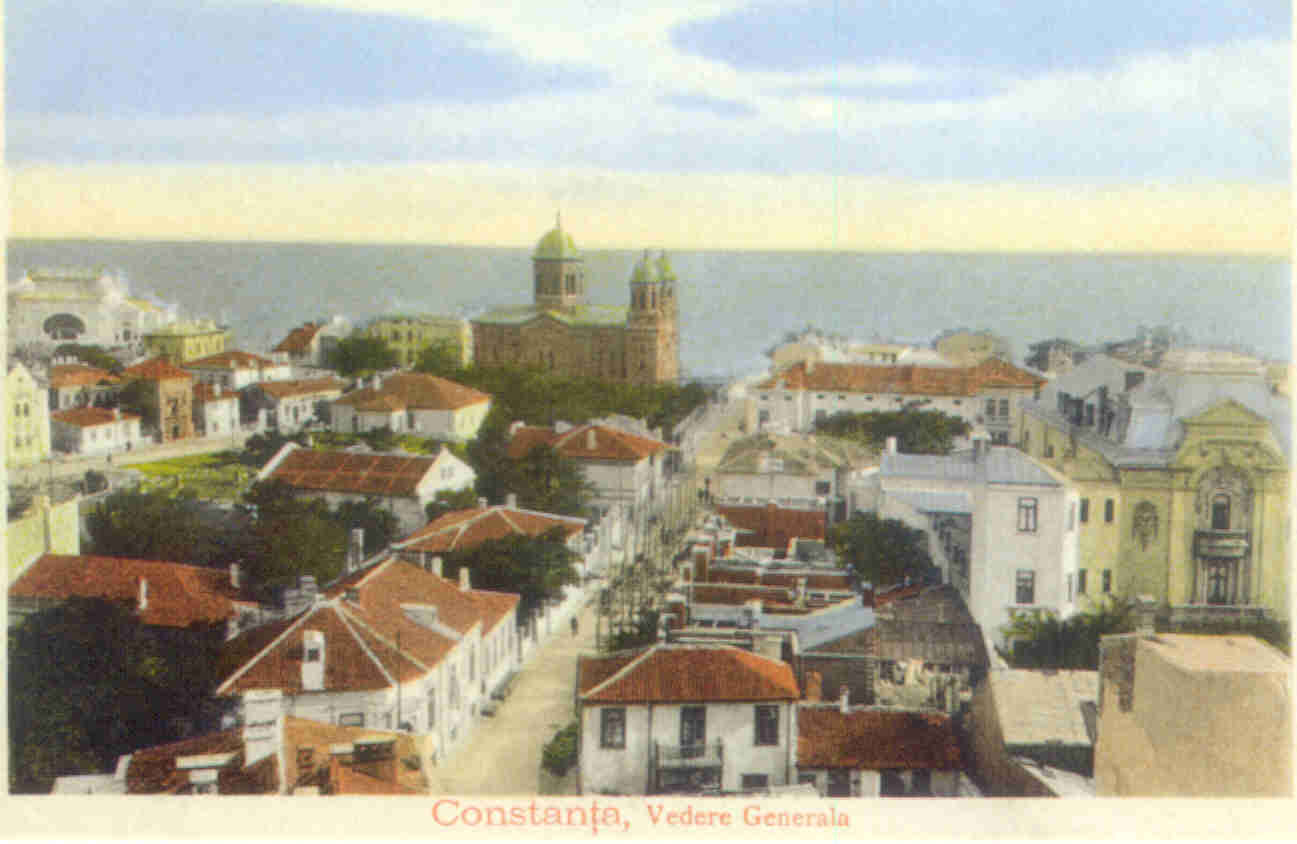
City of Constanța in 1909

In primary school, Nicolae excelled at mathematics, and he was encouraged by a teacher to apply for a scholarship at a secondary school, the Lyceum Mânăstirea Dealu ("Lycée of the Monastery of the Hill"), a new military prep school in the town. Nicolae won a scholarship there in 1916, but his attendance was delayed by Romania's entry into World War I. His widowed mother fled with the family to Bucharest, the country's capital, where they stayed with Nicolae's maternal grandmother during the rest of the war.

Georgescu accepted a scholarship at the University of Bucharest in 1923, and earned the equivalent of a master's degree in mathematics from the university in 1926. In college, he adopted Roegen as an additional last name, using the first and the last letter of his first name, plus the first four letters of his last name, reversed, to create Roegen. Later in his life, he also changed his first name to its French and English form, Nicholas.

After a year of teaching as a secondary school teacher in Constanta, Georgescu-Roegen moved to Paris to study at the Sorbonne, following a recommendation from his professor, Traian Lalescu.

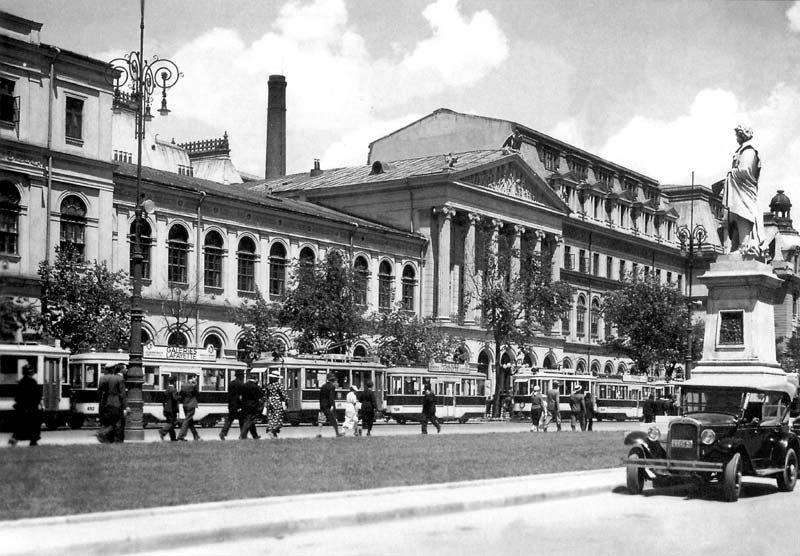
University of Bucharest c. 1921

=== Studying in Paris and London ===
Georgescu-Roegen's stay in Paris broadened his field of study well beyond pure mathematics. Not only did he attend the lectures of the best statistics and economics professors in France, he also immersed himself in the philosophy of science, especially the works of Blaise Pascal, Ernst Mach, and Henri Bergson. Daily life was not easy for a poor foreign student in a great city. The meager means he received from Romania could barely support even his most basic necessities, and French students habitually referred to all foreign students by the derogatory term métèques, 'strangers'. But his studies progressed splendidly: in 1930, Georgescu-Roegen defended his doctoral dissertation on how to discover the cyclical components of a phenomenon. He passed with extraordinary honour. Émile Borel, one of Georgescu-Roegen's professors, thought so highly of the dissertation that he had it published in full as a special issue of a French academic journal.

While studying in Paris, Georgescu-Roegen learned of the work of Karl Pearson at University College London. Pearson was a leading English scholar of the time, with a field of interests that coincided with Georgescu-Roegen's own, namely mathematics, statistics, and philosophy of science. Georgescu-Roegen made arrangements to lodge with the family of a young Englishman he had met in Paris and left for England in 1931. During his stay in London, his hosts not only accepted Georgescu-Roegen as their paying guest, but also taught him the basics of the English language, in preparation for his studies in the country.

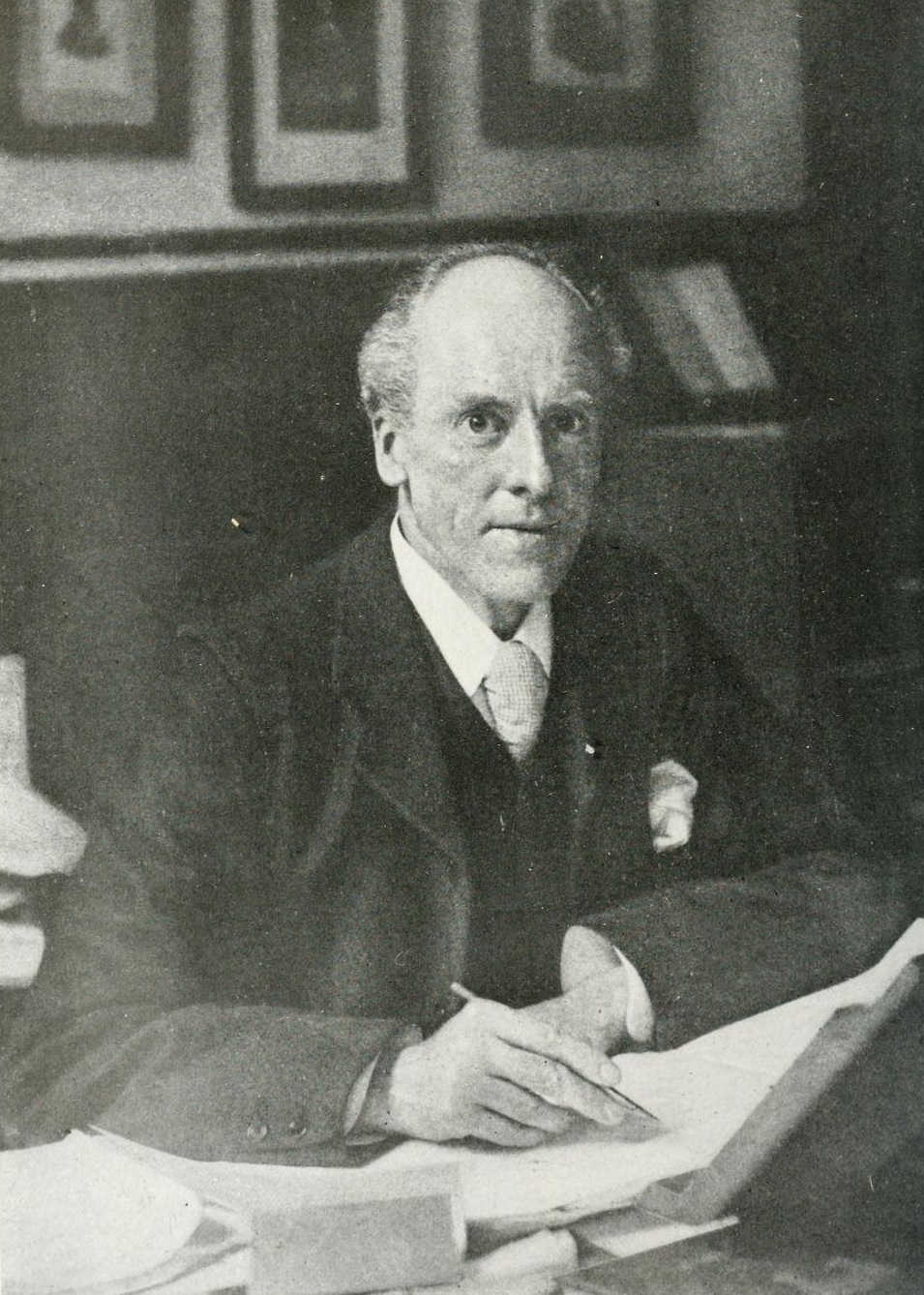
Pearson's field of interests coincided with Georgescu-Roegen's own.

When he approached Pearson and the English university system, Georgescu-Roegen was amazed with the informality and openness he found. There was no more feeling like a métèque, a stranger. Studying with Pearson for the next two years and reading Pearson's work on the philosophy of science, titled The Grammar of Science, further shaped Georgescu-Roegen's scientific methodology and philosophy. The two became friends, and Pearson encouraged Georgescu-Roegen to carry on with his studies in mathematical statistics. They co-pioneered research on the so-called "problem of moments", one of the most difficult topics in statistics at the time, but neither was able to solve the problem. This was a great disappointment to Pearson, but Georgescu-Roegen was pleased by their joint effort nonetheless.

While studying in London, Georgescu-Roegen was contacted by a representative of the U.S.-based Rockefeller Foundation. Due to his past academic achievements, the foundation wanted to grant Georgescu-Roegen a research fellowship in the U.S. Georgescu-Roegen had earlier learned of the use of time series analyses by the then famous Harvard Economic Barometer at Harvard University, so he accepted the grant. The trip was put off for about a year, however, as he had more pressing obligations in Romania: He needed to conclude his first national editorial project, a 500-page manual on Metoda Statistică, and he had to care for his aging widowed mother who was in bad health.

=== Trip to the United States, meeting Schumpeter ===
In autumn 1934, Georgescu-Roegen went to the United States. On arriving at Harvard University, he learned that the Economic Barometer had been shut down years before: The project had completely failed to predict the Wall Street Crash of 1929, and was soon abandoned altogether. After several failed attempts to find another sponsor for his research, Georgescu-Roegen finally managed a meeting with the professor at the university teaching business cycles to see if there were any other opportunities available to him. This professor happened to be Joseph Schumpeter.

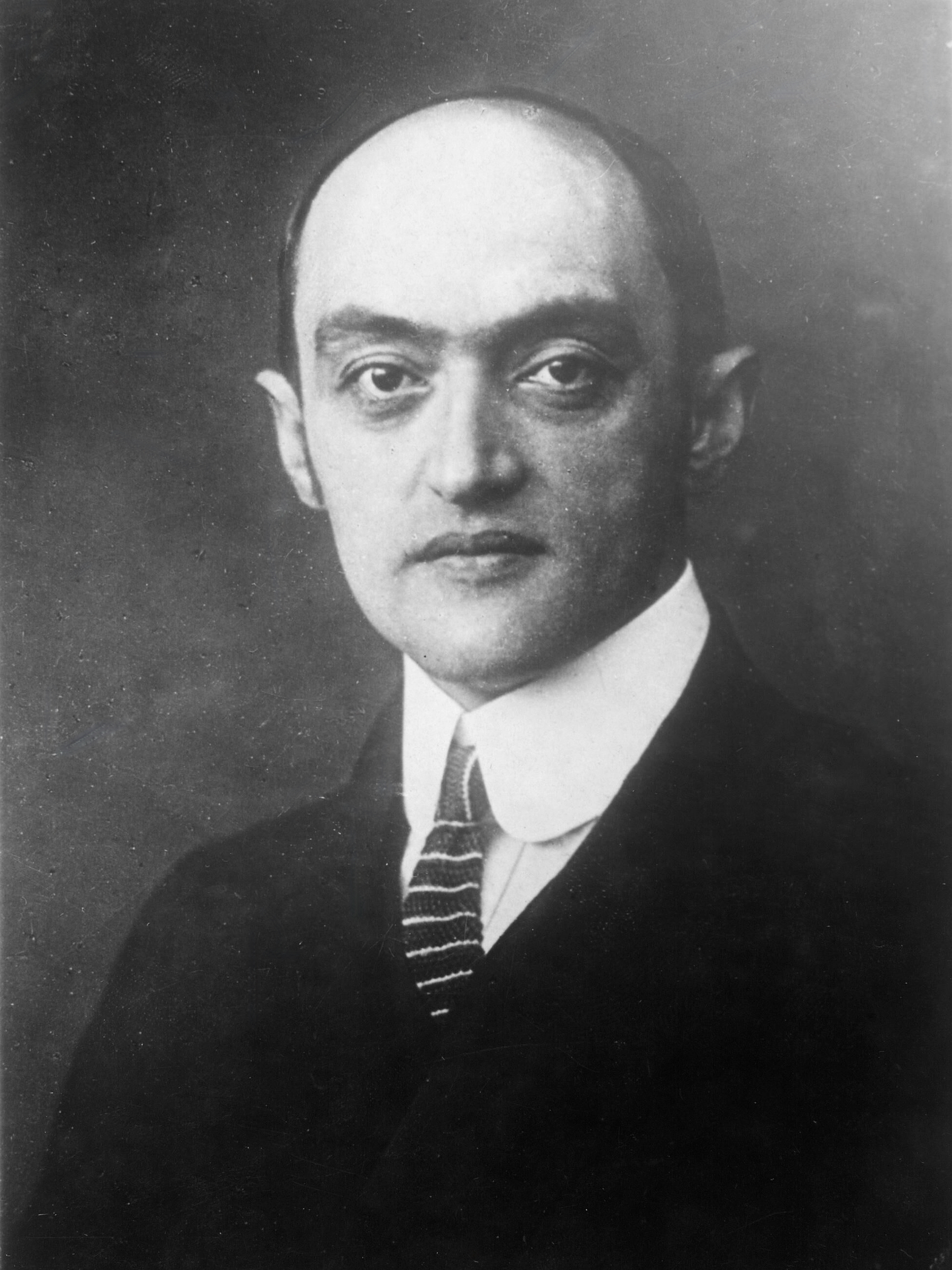
Schumpeter became Georgescu-Roegen's mentor at Harvard.

Meeting Schumpeter at this point completely changed the direction of Georgescu-Roegen's life and career. Schumpeter warmly welcomed Georgescu-Roegen to Harvard, and soon introduced him to the now famous 'circle', one of the most remarkable groups of economists ever working at the same institution, including Wassily Leontief, Oskar Lange, Fritz Machlup, and Nicholas Kaldor, among others. Georgescu-Roegen was now in a stimulating intellectual environment with weekly evening gatherings and informal academic discussions, where Schumpeter himself presided as the 'ringmaster' of the circle. In Schumpeter, Georgescu-Roegen had found a competent and sympathetic mentor. Although Georgescu-Roegen never formally enrolled in any economics classes, this was how he became an economist: "Schumpeter turned me into an economist ... My only degree in economics is from Universitas Schumpeteriana."

While at Harvard, Georgescu-Roegen published four important papers, laying the foundations for his later theories of consumption and production. The scholarly quality of these articles impressed Schumpeter.

Georgescu-Roegen's trip to the U.S. was not all spent at Harvard. He managed to obtain a modest stipend for himself and his wife Otilia that enabled them to travel about the country, journeying as far as California. Through Schumpeter's contacts, Georgescu-Roegen had the opportunity to meet Irving Fisher, Harold Hotelling, and other leading economists of the day. He also met Albert Einstein at Princeton University.

During his stay, Georgescu-Roegen's relationship with Schumpeter developed. Realising that Georgescu-Roegen was a promising young scholar, Schumpeter wanted to keep him at Harvard. He offered Georgescu-Roegen a position with the economics faculty, and asked him to work with him on an economics treatise as a joint effort, but Georgescu-Roegen declined. He wanted to go back to Romania in order to serve his backward fatherland that had sponsored most of his education so far; besides, his return was expected at home. Later in his life, Georgescu-Roegen would regret having turned down Schumpeter's generous offer at this point in his career.

In spring 1936, Georgescu-Roegen left the U.S. His voyage back to Romania came to last almost a year in itself, as he paid a long visit to Friedrich Hayek and John Hicks at the London School of Economics on the way home. He was in no hurry to return.

=== The Romanian 'exile' and the flight from there ===
From 1937 to 1948, Georgescu-Roegen lived in Romania, where he witnessed all the turmoil of World War II and the subsequent rise to power of the communists in the country. During the war, Georgescu-Roegen lost his only brother due to a fatal reaction to a tuberculosis vaccine.

Upon his return from the U.S. to Bucharest, Georgescu-Roegen was soon appointed to several government posts. His doctoral dissertation from Sorbonne as well as his other academic credentials earned him a respectable reputation everywhere, and his fine French and English skills were needed in the foreign affairs department. He became vice-director of the Central Statistical Institute, responsible for compiling data on the country's foreign trade on a daily basis; he also served on the National Board of Trade, settling commercial agreements with the major foreign powers; he even participated in the diplomatic negotiations concerning the reassignment of Romania's national borders with Hungary.

Georgescu-Roegen engaged himself in politics and joined the pro-monarchy National Peasants' Party. The country's economy was still underdeveloped and had a large agrarian base, where the mass of the peasantry lived in backwardness and poverty. Substantial land reforms were called for if the most appalling inequalities between the rural and the urban parts of the population were to be evened out. Georgescu-Roegen put a persuasive effort into this work and was soon elevated to the higher ranks of the party, becoming member of the party's National Council.

Georgescu-Roegen undertook little academic work during this period of his life. Apart from co-editing the national encyclopedia, the Enciclopedia României, and reporting on the country's economic situation in some minor statistics publications, he published nothing of scholarly significance. Although he did reside in his native country, Georgescu-Roegen would later refer to this period of his life as his Romanian 'exile': The exile was an intellectual one for him.

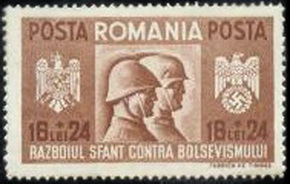
During most of the war, Romania was an Axis power allied with Nazi Germany "... against Bolshevism."

By the end of the war, Romania was occupied by the Soviet Union. A trusted government official and a leading member of an influential political party, Georgescu-Roegen was appointed general secretary of the Armistice Commission, responsible for negotiating the conditions for peace with the occupying power. The negotiations dragged out for half a year and came to involve long and stressful discussions: During most of the war, Romania had been an Axis power allied with Nazi Germany, so the Soviet representatives treated the commission as nothing but a vehicle for levying the largest possible amount of war reparations on the Romanian people.

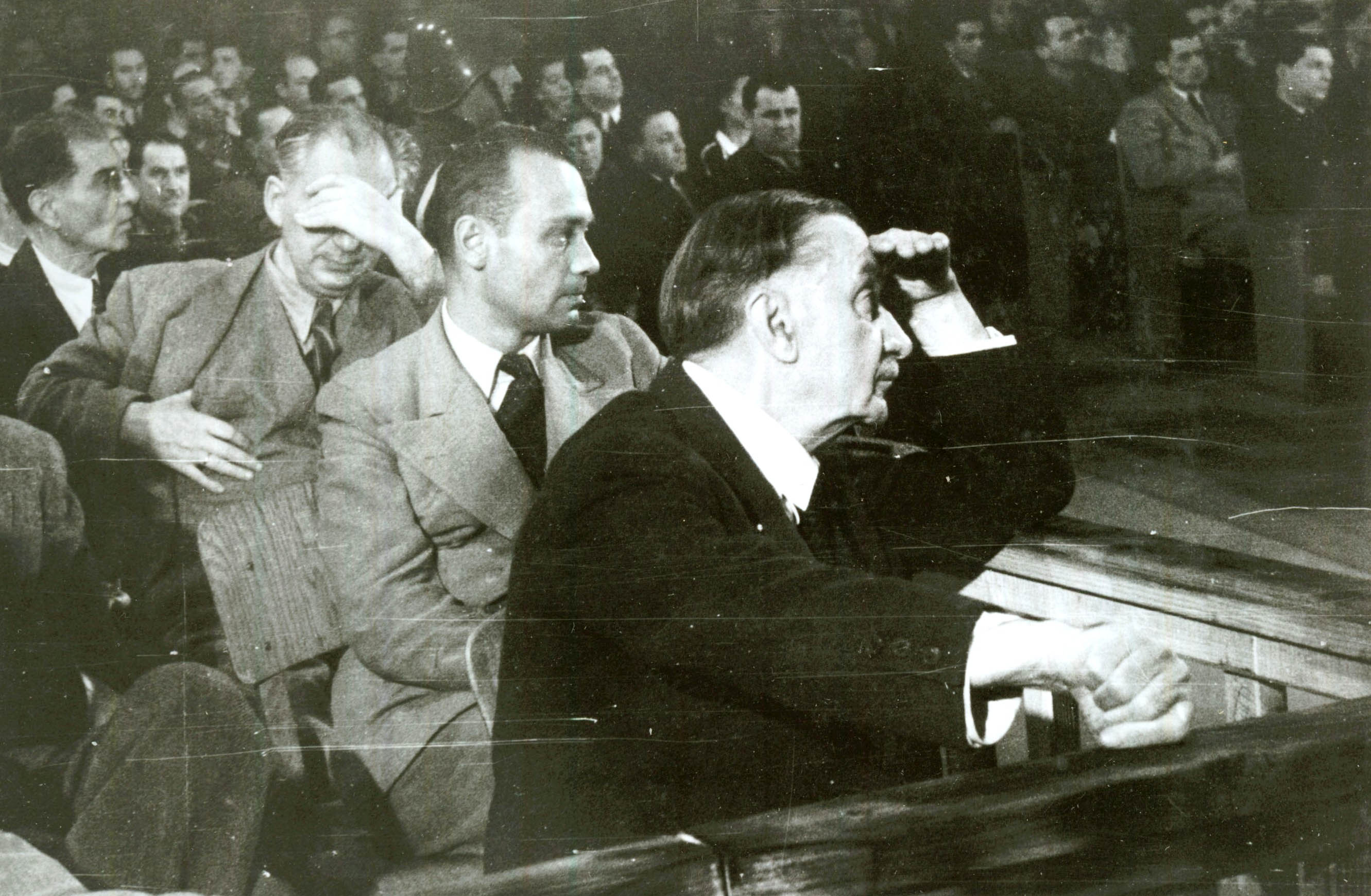
As the communists rose to power, the leading members of the National Peasants' Party were rounded up and put on show trial in 1947. Many were sentenced to life imprisonment.

After the war, political forces in the country began encroaching on Georgescu-Roegen. Before and during the war, Romania had already passed through three successive dictatorships, and the fourth one was now imminent. Plenty of items on Georgescu-Roegen's track record antagonised both the native Romanian communists and the Soviet authorities that still occupied the country: His top membership of the Peasants' Party, in open opposition to the Communist Party; his chief negotiating position in the Armistice Commission, defending Romania's sovereignty against the occupying power; and his earlier affiliation with capitalist US as a Rockefeller research fellow at Harvard University. Political repression in the country intensified as the rise to power of the communists was completing, and Georgescu-Roegen finally realised it was time to get away: "... I had to flee Romania before I was thrown into a jail from which no one has ever come out alive."

Having visited Turkey before on official business, Georgescu-Roegen was able to use his contacts there to notify Schumpeter and Leontief at Harvard University in the U.S. about his flight. Leontief offered Georgescu-Roegen a position at Harvard, and made the necessary arrangements for the couple in advance of their arrival there.

=== Settling in the United States, years at Vanderbilt University ===
After a journey from Turkey through continental Europe, Georgescu-Roegen and his wife reached Cherbourg in France, from where they crossed the Atlantic by ship. Georgescu-Roegen's arrival at Harvard in summer 1948 was something of a return for him there. Only now, the circumstances were very different from what they had been in the 1930s: He was no longer a promising young scholar on a trip abroad, supported and sponsored by his native country; instead, he was a middle-aged political refugee who had fled a communist dictatorship behind the Iron Curtain. Yet, he was welcomed at Harvard just the same, obtaining employment as a lecturer and research associate, collaborating with Wassily Leontief on the Harvard Economic Research Project and other subjects. This was not a permanent position, however.

While working at Harvard, Georgescu-Roegen was approached by Vanderbilt University, who offered him a permanent academic chair as economics professor. Georgescu-Roegen accepted the offer and moved to Vanderbilt in Nashville, Tennessee in 1949. It has been argued that Georgescu-Roegen's decision to move from Harvard to the permanence and stability of the less prestigious Vanderbilt was motivated by his precarious wartime experiences and his feeling of insecurity as a political refugee in his new country. It has also been argued that Joseph Schumpeter had at this point lost most of his former influence that could have secured Georgescu-Roegen a permanent position at Harvard (Schumpeter died in 1950). Georgescu-Roegen remained at Vanderbilt until his retirement in 1976 at age 70. Except for short trips, he would never leave Nashville again.

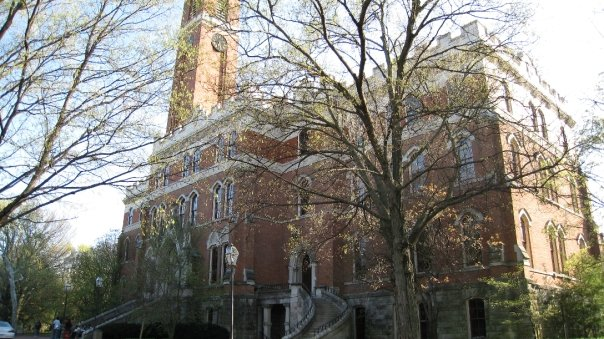
Vanderbilt University

During his years at Vanderbilt University, Georgescu-Roegen pursued an impressive academic career. He held numerous visiting appointments and research fellowships across the continents, and served as editor of a range of academic journals, including the Econometrica. He received several academic honours, including the distinguished Harvie Branscomb Award, presented in 1967 by his employer, Vanderbilt University. In 1971, the very same year his magnum opus was published, he was honoured as Distinguished Fellow of the American Economic Association.

In the early 1960s, Georgescu-Roegen had Herman Daly as a student. Daly later went on to become a leading ecological economist as well as the economics profession's most faithful, persistent and influential proponent of the economics of Georgescu-Roegen. However, Georgescu-Roegen, for his part, would later become critical of his student's work (see below).

The publication of Georgescu-Roegen's magnum opus in 1971 did not trigger any immediate debates in the mainstream of the economics profession, and the only review in a leading mainstream journal warned the readers against the "incorrect statements and philosophical generalisations" made by the author; but Georgescu-Roegen did receive four favourable reviews from heterodox, evolutionary economists.

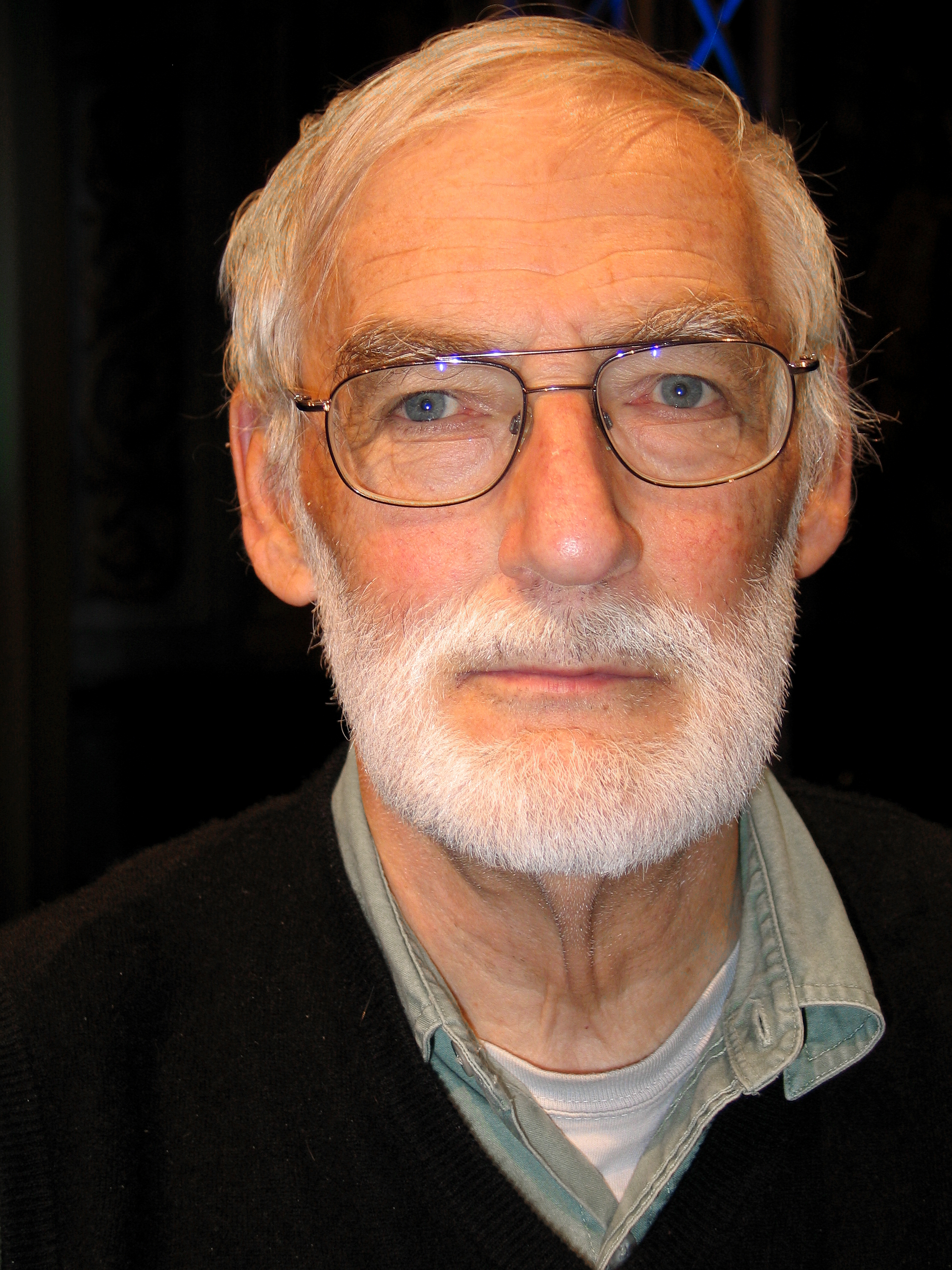
Meadows was the director of the Club of Rome project at MIT in 1970–72.

Through the 1970s, Georgescu-Roegen had a short-lived cooperation with the Club of Rome. Whereas Georgescu-Roegen's own magnum opus went largely unnoticed by mainstream (neoclassical) economists, the report on The Limits to Growth, published in 1972 by the Club of Rome, created something of a stir in the economics profession. In the heated controversies that followed the report, Georgescu-Roegen found himself largely on the same side as the club, and opposed to the mainstream economists. Teaming up with a natural ally, he approached the club and became a member there. Georgescu-Roegen's theoretical work came to influence the club substantially. One other important result of the cooperation was the publication of the pointed and polemical article on Energy and Economic Myths, where Georgescu-Roegen took issue with mainstream economists and various other debaters. This article found a large audience through the 1970s. Later, the cooperation with the club waned: Georgescu-Roegen reproached the club for not adopting a definite anti-growth political stance; he was also sceptical of the club's elitist and technocratic fashion of attempting to monitor and guide global social reality by building numerous abstract computer simulations of the world economy, and then publish all the findings to the general public. In the early-1980s, the parties finally split up.

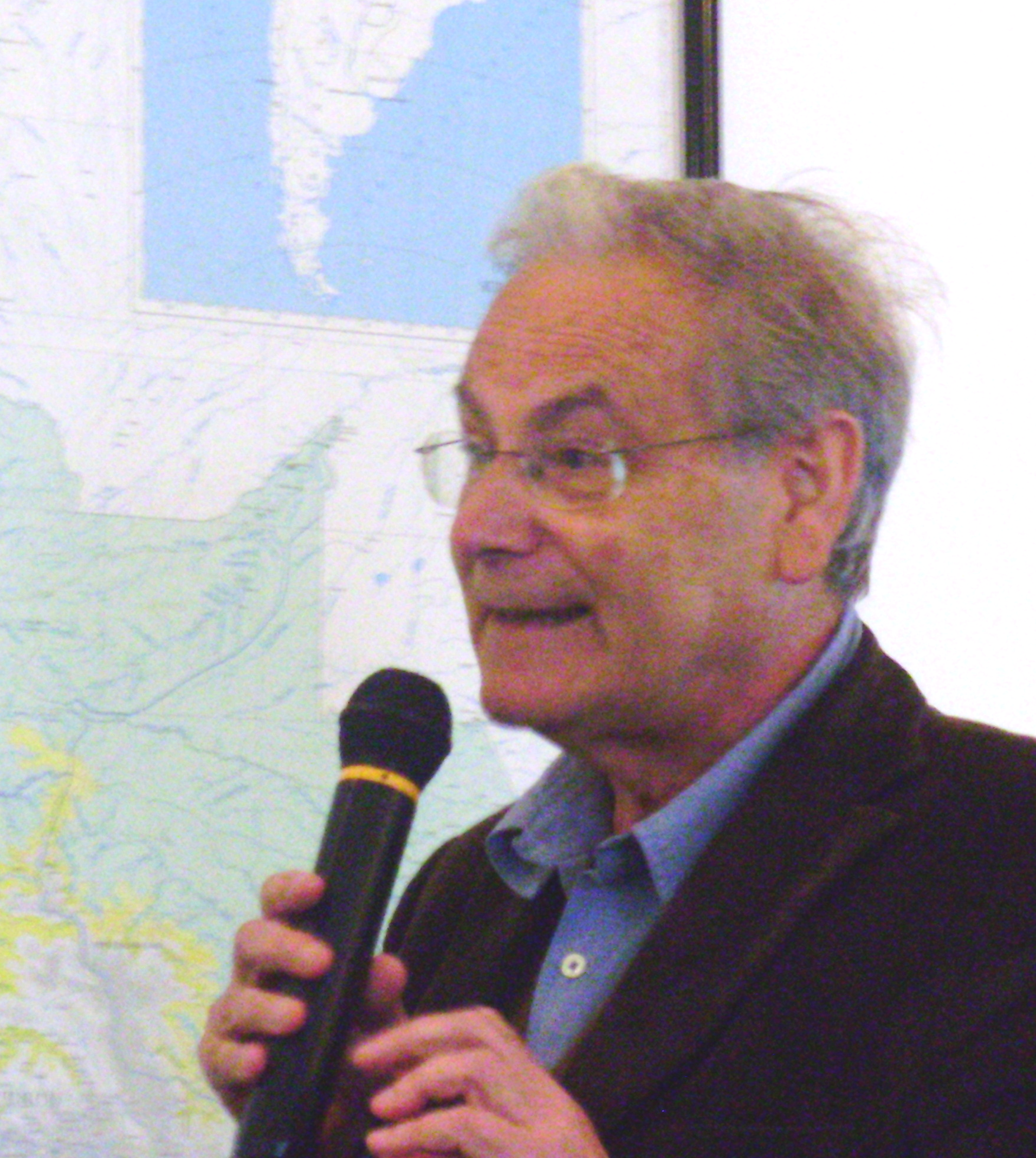
Martínez-Alier has been a driving force behind both ecological economics and the degrowth movement. He has also published a historical study of various ecological theorists preceding Georgescu-Roegen.

In continental Europe, Georgescu-Roegen and his work gained influence from the 1970s. When Georgescu-Roegen delivered a lecture at the University of Geneva in Switzerland in 1974, he made a lasting impression on the young and newly graduated French historian and philosopher Jacques Grinevald. The ensuing cooperation and friendship between the two resulted in the French translation of a selection of Georgescu-Roegen's articles entitled Demain la décroissance: Entropie – Écologie – Économie ("Tomorrow, the Decline: Entropy – Ecology – Economy"), published in 1979. (Note: The translation of the French term décroissance has evolved over time. An account of the politics and semantics involved in the development is provided here.) Similar to his involvement with the Club of Rome (see above), Georgescu-Roegen's article on Energy and Economic Myths came to play a crucial role in the dissemination of his views among the later followers of the degrowth movement. In the 1980s, Georgescu-Roegen met and befriended Catalan agricultural economist and historian of economic thought Joan Martinez Alier, who would soon after become a driving force in the establishing of both the International Society for Ecological Economics and the degrowth movement. Since the degrowth movement formed in France and Italy in the early-2000s, leading French champion of the movement Serge Latouche has credited Georgescu-Roegen for being a "main theoretical source of degrowth." Likewise, Italian degrowth theorist Mauro Bonaiuti has considered Georgescu-Roegen's work to be "one of the analytical cornerstones of the degrowth perspective."

Apart from his involvement with the Club of Rome and a few European scholars, Georgescu-Roegen remained a solitary man throughout the years at Vanderbilt. He rarely discussed his ongoing work with colleagues and students, and he collaborated in very few joint projects during his career. In addition, several independent sources confirm the observation that Georgescu-Roegen's uncompromising personality and bad temper made him a rather unpleasant acquaintance to deal with. His blunt and demanding behaviour tended to offend most people in academia and elsewhere, thereby undermining his influence and standing.

On Georgescu-Roegen's formal retirement in 1976, a symposium in his honour was organised by three of his colleagues at Vanderbilt, and the papers presented there were later published as an anthology. No fewer than four Nobel Prize laureates were among the contributing economists; but none of the colleagues from Georgescu-Roegen's department at Vanderbilt participated, a fact that has since been taken as evidence of his social and academic isolation at the place.

=== Retirement, later years and death ===
After Georgescu-Roegen's formal retirement from Vanderbilt in 1976, he continued to live and work as an emeritus in his home in Nashville until his death in 1994. Through these later years, he wrote several articles and papers, expanding on and developing his views. He also corresponded extensively with his few friends and former colleagues.

In 1988, Georgescu-Roegen was invited to join the editorial board of the newly established academic journal Ecological Economics, published by the International Society for Ecological Economics; but although most of the people organising the journal and the society recognised and admired Georgescu-Roegen's work, he turned down the invitation: He regarded both the journal and the society as nothing but vehicles for promoting concepts like sustainable development and steady-state economics, concepts he himself dismissed as misdirected and wrong (see below, both here and here). Georgescu-Roegen had more ambitious goals in mind: He wanted to overturn and replace the prevailing, but flawed, mainstream paradigm of neoclassical economics with his own 'bioeconomics' (see below); to downscale (degrow) the economy as soon as possible (see below); and not merely be relegated to some arcane and insignificant – so he believed – economics sub-discipline such as ecological economics.

Georgescu-Roegen lived long enough to survive the communist dictatorship in Romania he had fled earlier in his life (see above). He even received some late recognition from his fatherland: In the wake of the fall of the Berlin Wall and the subsequent Romanian Revolution in 1989, Georgescu-Roegen was elected to the Romanian Academy in Bucharest. He was pleased by his election.

His last years were marked by seclusion and withdrawal from the world. By now, Georgescu-Roegen was an old man. Although he had a productive and successful academic career behind him, he was disappointed that his work had not received the dissemination and recognition he had expected for it in his own lifetime. He believed he had long been running against a current. As he likened himself to one unlucky heretic and legendary martyr of science out of the Italian Renaissance, Georgescu-Roegen grumbled and exclaimed: "E pur si muove is ordinarily attributed to Galileo, although those words were the last ones uttered by Giordano Bruno on the burning stake!" He came to realise that he had failed in his life's work to warn the general public and change people's minds about the looming mineral resource exhaustion he himself was very concerned about. He finally grasped that philosophical pessimism may well be a stance favoured by a few solitary intellectuals like himself, but such a stance is normally shunned like a taboo in wider human culture: "[A] considered pessimist is looked upon as a bearer of bad news and ... is not welcomed ever ...", he lamented. Yet, in spite of his deep disappointment and frustration, he continued to write down and propagate his views as long as he was physically able to do so.

By the end, his health deteriorated. He was becoming rather deaf, and complications caused by his diabetes rendered him unable to climb stairs. In his final years, he isolated himself completely. He cut off all human contact, even to those of his former colleagues and students who appreciated his contribution to economics. He died bitter and (almost) lonely in his home at the age of 88. His wife Otilia survived him by some four years. The couple had no children. At his express request, his ashes were brought to Romania and deposited at Bellu Cemetery, in the sector reserved for academics.

In his obituary essay on Georgescu-Roegen, Herman Daly wrote admirably of his deceased teacher and mentor, concluding that "He demanded a lot, but he gave more." In another obituary article, Georgescu-Roegen was hailed for the "novelty and importance of his contributions", for which he should have been awarded the Nobel Prize in Economics.

== Work ==
In his work as an economist, Georgescu-Roegen was influenced by the philosophy of Ernst Mach and the later school of logical positivism derived from Mach. Georgescu-Roegen found that two of his other main sources of inspiration, namely Karl Pearson and Albert Einstein, also had a largely Machian outlook. "My philosophy is in spirit Machian: it is ... mainly [concerned] with the problem of valid analytical representations of the relations among facts." Much of his criticism of both neoclassical economics and of Marxism was based on this outlook.

Coming to the U.S. after World War II, Georgescu-Roegen's background soon put him at odds with the dominant theoretical school of neoclassical economics in the country. Having lived in Romania, an underdeveloped and peasant-dominated economy, he realised that neoclassical economics could explain only those social conditions that prevailed in advanced capitalist economies, but not in other institutional settings. He was also critical of the increasing use of abstract algebraic formalism grounded in no facts of social reality. Both of these issues made him attentive to social phenomena that were either overlooked or misrepresented by mainstream neoclassical economic analysis.

It has been argued that an unbroken path runs from Georgescu-Roegen's work in pure theory in the early years, through his writings on peasant economies in the 1960s, leading to his preoccupation with entropy and bioeconomics in the last 25 years of his life.

=== Magnum opus on The Entropy Law and the Economic Process ===
According to Georgescu-Roegen's own recollection, the ideas presented in his paradigmatic magnum opus were worked out in his mind over a period of twenty years or so before the final publication. The three most important sources of inspiration for his work were Émile Borel's monograph on thermodynamics he had read while studying in Paris (see above); Joseph Schumpeter's view that irreversible evolutionary changes are inherent in capitalism; and the Romanian historical record of the large oil refineries in Ploiești becoming target of strategic military attacks in both world wars, proving the importance of natural resources in social conflict.

==== The shortcomings of both neoclassical economics and of Marxism ====
Georgescu-Roegen outlines that both main streams of economic thought having dominated the world since the end of the 19th century – namely neoclassical economics and Marxism – share the shortcoming of not taking into account the importance of natural resources in man's economy. Hence, Georgescu-Roegen engages himself in an intellectual battle with two fronts.

==== The relevance of thermodynamics to economics ====
The physical theory of thermodynamics is based on two laws: The first law states that energy is neither created nor destroyed in any isolated system (a conservation principle). The second law of thermodynamics – also known as the entropy law – states that in an isolated system, entropy, a measure of the disorder in a system, normally cannot decrease.

Georgescu-Roegen argues that the relevance of thermodynamics to economics stems from the physical fact that man can neither create nor destroy matter or energy, only transform it. The usual economic terms of 'production' and 'consumption' are mere verbal conventions that tend to obscure that nothing is created and nothing is destroyed in the economic process – everything is being transformed.

Thermodynamics has relevance to cosmology via the hypothesis of the heat death of the universe. Georgescu-Roegen sees the transformation of energy – whether in nature or in human society – as moving the universe closer towards a final state of inert physical, statistical uniformity and maximum entropy. Georgescu-Roegen argues from this inspiration from cosmology that humanity's economic activities shorten the time frame to planetary heat death, locally on Earth. This view on the economy was later termed 'entropy pessimism'. Some of Georgescu-Roegen's followers and interpreters have elaborated on this view.

==== Conceptions of scarcity ====
Georgescu-Roegen's principal argument is that economic scarcity is rooted in physical reality. Introducing the term 'low entropy' for valuable natural resources, and the term 'high entropy' for valueless waste and pollution, Georgescu-Roegen explains that all the economic process does from a physical point of view is to irreversibly transform low entropy into high entropy, thereby providing a flow of natural resources for people to live on. The irreversibility of this economic process is the reason why natural resources are scarce: Recycling of material resources is possible, but only by using up some energy resources plus an additional amount of other material resources; and energy resources, in turn, cannot be recycled at all, but are dissipated as waste heat (according to the entropy law).

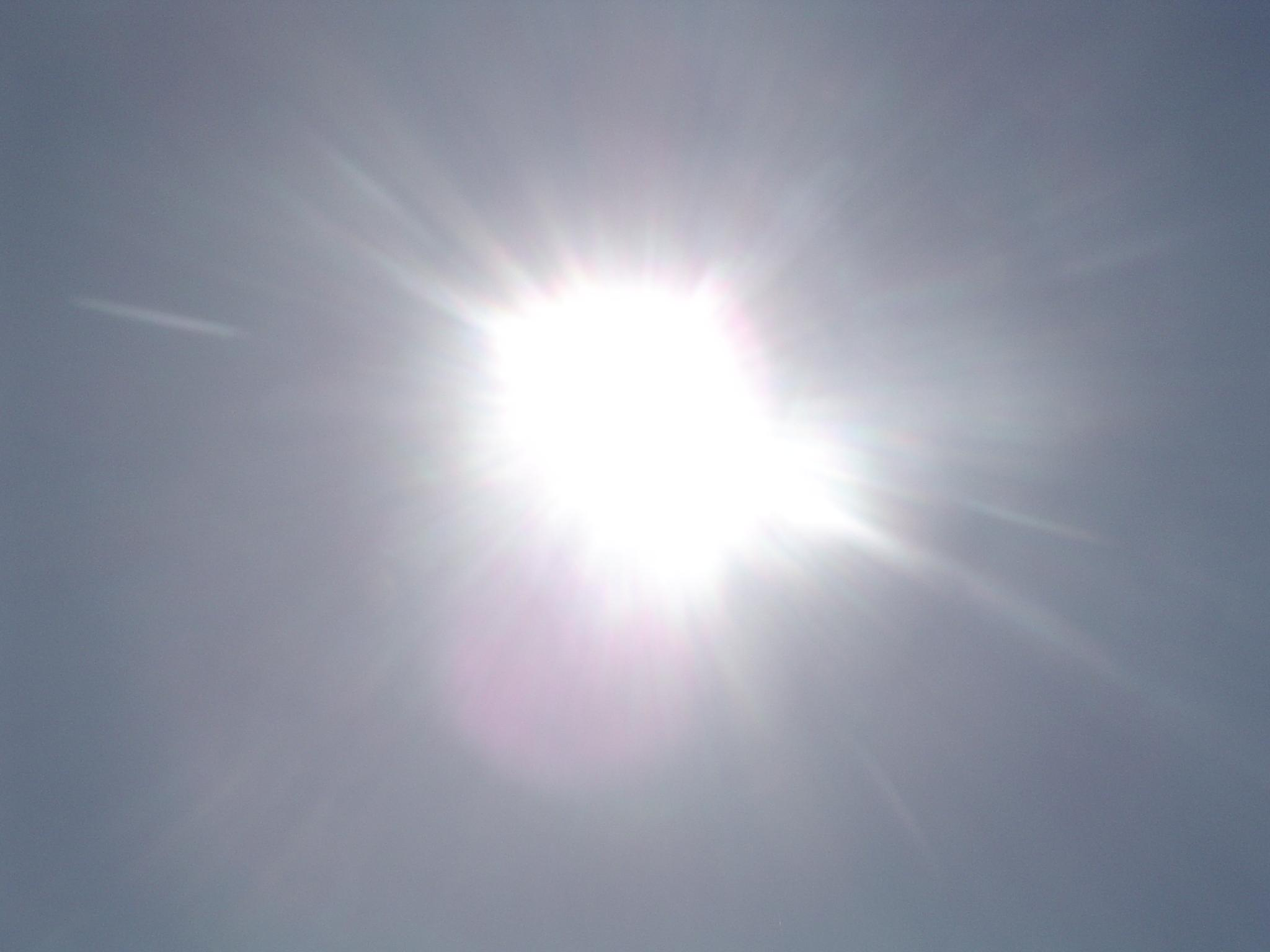
The sun will continue to shine on earth for billions of years to come.

Georgescu-Roegen points out that the earth is a closed system in the thermodynamic sense of the term: the earth exchanges energy, but not matter (practically) with the rest of the universe. Hence, mainly two sources of low entropy are available to man, namely the stock of mineral resources in the crust of the earth; and the flow of radiation, received from the sun. Since the sun will continue to shine for billions of years to come, the earth's mineral stock is the scarcer one of these two main sources of low entropy. Whereas the stock of minerals may be extracted from the crust of the earth at a rate of our own choosing (practically), the flow of solar radiation arrives at the surface of the earth at a constant and fixed rate, beyond human control, Georgescu-Roegen maintains. This natural 'asymmetry' between man's access to the stock of minerals and the flow of solar energy accounts for the historical contrast between urban and rural life: The busy urban life, on the one hand, is associated with industry and the impatient extraction of minerals; the tranquil rural life, on the other hand, is associated with agriculture and the patient reception of the fixed flow of solar energy. Georgescu-Roegen argues that this 'asymmetry' helps explain the historical subjection of the countryside by the town since the dawn of civilisation, and he criticises Karl Marx for not taking this subjection properly into account in his theory of historical materialism.

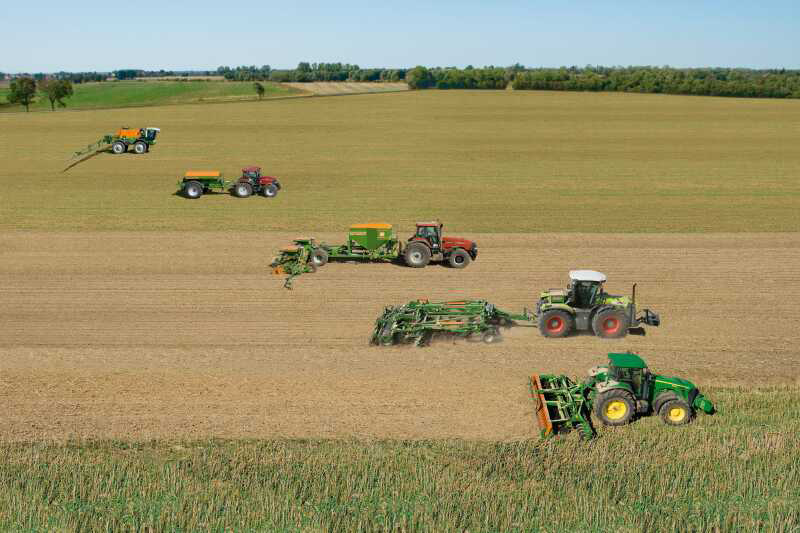
Modern mechanised agriculture relies heavily on mineral inputs.

Georgescu-Roegen explains that modern mechanised agriculture has developed historically as a result of the growing pressure of population on arable land; but the relief of this pressure by means of mechanisation has only substituted a scarcer source of input for the more abundant input of solar radiation: Machinery, chemical fertilisers and pesticides all rely on mineral resources for their operation, rendering modern agriculture – and the industrialised food processing and distribution systems associated with it – almost as dependent on earth's mineral stock as the industrial sector has always been. Georgescu-Roegen cautions that this situation is a major reason why the carrying capacity of earth is decreasing. In effect, overpopulation on earth is largely a dynamic long run phenomenon, being a by-product of ever more constraining mineral scarcities.

==== The production process and the flow-fund model ====
Georgescu-Roegen's model of the economy grew out of his dissatisfaction with neoclassical production theory as well as the input-output model of the economy, developed by Nobel Prize laureate Wassily Leontief. Georgescu-Roegen realised that production cannot be adequately described by stocks of equipment and inventories only, or by flows of inputs and outputs only. It was necessary to combine these two descriptions. In order to complete the picture, it was also necessary to add the new concept of a "fund".

In Georgescu-Roegen's flow-fund model of production, a fund factor is either labour power, farmland, or man-made capital providing a useful service at any point in time. A "stock" factor is a material or energy input that can be decumulated at will; a "flow" factor is a stock spread out over a period of time. The fund factors constitute the agents of the economic process, and the flow factors are used or acted upon by these agents. Unlike a stock factor, a fund factor cannot be used (decumulated) at will, as its rate of utilisation depends on the distinct physical properties of the fund (labour power and farmland, for instance, may run the risk of overuse and exhaustion if proper care is not taken).

Natural resources flow through the economy and end up as waste and pollution.

Contrary to neoclassical production theory, Georgescu-Roegen identifies nature as the exclusive primary source of all factors of production. According to the first law of thermodynamics, matter and energy are neither created nor destroyed in the economy (the conservation principle). According to the second law of thermodynamics – the entropy law – what happens in the economy is that all matter and energy is transformed from states available for human purposes to states unavailable for human purposes (the degradation principle). This transformation constitutes a unidirectional and irreversible process. Consequently, valuable natural resources ("low entropy") are procured by the input end of the economy; the resources flow through the economy, being transformed and manufactured into goods along the way; and unvaluable waste and pollution ("high entropy") eventually accumulate by the output end. Humankind lives in, by, and of nature, and we return our residues to nature. By so doing, the entropy of the combined nature-economy system steadily increases.

The presence of natural resource flows in Georgescu-Roegen's model of production (production function) differentiates the model from those of both Keynesian macroeconomics, neoclassical economics, as well as classical economics, including most – though not all – variants of Marxism. (Note: Some Marxist scholars have made bold attempts at integrating Marxism and ecology.) Only in ecological economics are natural resource flows positively recognised as a valid theoretical basis for economic modelling and analysis.

Later, Georgescu-Roegen's production model formed the basis of his criticism of neoclassical economics (see below).

From the 1980s, numerous economists have been working on Georgesu-Roegen's flow-fund model. (Note: See, for example: For a critical review of this literature, see:) In 1992, Mario Morroni presented a development of the flow-fund model for applied analysis. This model has been implemented in some case studies regarding the textile industry, electronic devices for telecommunication industry, shoe industry, and tie industry.

==== Man's economic struggle and the social evolution of mankind (bioeconomics) ====
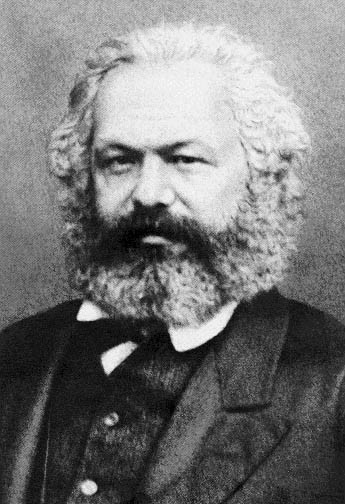
Marx was optimistic about the future communist society; but Georgescu-Roegen objected that social conflict will never be eliminated.

In his social theory, Georgescu-Roegen argues that man's economic struggle to work and earn a livelihood is largely a continuation and extension of his biological struggle to sustain life and survive. This biological struggle has prevailed since the dawn of man, and the nature of the struggle was not altered by the invention of money as a medium of exchange. Unlike animals, man has developed exosomatic instruments, that is, tools and equipment. These instruments are produced by man and are not a part of his body. At the same time, production is a social, and not an individual, undertaking. This situation has turned man's struggle to sustain life and survive into a social conflict which is unique when compared to animals. Contrasting his own view with those of Karl Marx, Georgescu-Roegen asserts:

[L]ike Marx, I believe that the social conflict is not a mere creation of man without any root in material human conditions. But unlike Marx, I consider that, precisely because the conflict has such a basis, it can be eliminated neither by man's decision to do so nor by the social evolution of mankind.

When man (some men) attempts to radically change the distribution of access to material resources in society, this may result in wars or revolutions, Georgescu-Roegen admits; but even though wars and revolutions may bring about the intended redistributions, man's economic struggle and the social conflict will remain. There will be rulers and ruled in any social order, and the ruling is largely a continuation of the biological struggle of sustaining life and survive, Georgescu-Roegen claims. Under these material conditions, the ruling classes of past and present have always resorted to force, ideology and manipulation to defend their privileges and maintain the acquiescence of the ruled. This historical fact does not end with communism, Georgescu-Roegen points out; quite the opposite, it goes on during communism, and beyond it as well. It would be contrary to man's biological nature to organise himself otherwise.

Later, Georgescu-Roegen introduced the term 'bioeconomics' (short for 'biological economics') to describe his view that man's economic struggle is a continuation of the biological struggle. In his final years, he planned to write a book on the subject of bioeconomics, but due to old age, he was unable to complete it. He did manage to write a sketch on it, though.

==== Population pressure, mineral resource exhaustion and the end of mankind ====
Georgescu-Roegen takes a dismal view on human nature and the future of mankind. On the one hand, his general argument is that the carrying capacity of earth – that is, earth's capacity to sustain human populations and consumption levels – is decreasing as earth's finite stocks of mineral resources are being extracted and put to use; but on the other hand, he finds that restraining ourselves collectively on a permanent and voluntary basis for the benefit of future generations runs counter to our biological nature as a species. We cannot help ourselves. Consequently, the world economy will continue growing until its inevitable and final collapse. From that point on, he predicts, ever deepening scarcities will cause widespread misery, aggravate social conflict throughout the globe, and intensify man's economic struggle to work and earn a livelihood. A prolonged 'biological spasm' of our species will follow, ultimately spelling the end of mankind itself, as man has already become completely and irreversibly dependent on the industrial economy for his biological existence. We are not going to make it. We are doomed to downfall, destruction, and demise. Predicts Georgescu-Roegen:

If we abstract from other causes that may knell the death bell of the human species, it is clear that natural resources represent the limitative factor as concerns the life span of that species. ... By using these resources too quickly, man throws away that part of solar energy that will still be reaching the Earth for a long time after he has departed. And everything man has done during the last two hundred years or so puts him in the position of a fantastic spendthrift. ... The realization of these truths will not make man willing to become less impatient and less prone to hollow wants.
...
Population pressure and technological progress bring ceteris paribus the career of the human species nearer to its end only because both factors cause a speedier decumulation of its dowry [of mineral resources]. ... [W]e must not doubt that, man's nature being what it is, the destiny of the human species is to choose a truly great but brief, not a long and dull, career.

Georgescu-Roegen's radically pessimistic 'existential risk' perspective on global mineral resource exhaustion was later countered by Robert Ayres (see below).

=== Work after magnum opus ===
In the years following the publication of his magnum opus in 1971 and until his death in 1994, Georgescu-Roegen published a number of articles and essays where he further expanded on and developed his views. (Note: A selection of these articles has been edited and republished by Italian degrowth theorist Mauro Bonaiuti, who also provides an introduction and an afterword.)

==== Criticising neoclassical economics (weak versus strong sustainability) ====
Criticising neoclassical economics, Georgescu-Roegen argues that neoclassical production theory is false when representing the economy as a mechanical, circular and closed system, with no inlets and no outlets. A misrepresentation such as this fails to take into account the exhaustion of mineral resources at the input end, and the building up of waste and pollution at the output end. In Georgescu-Roegen's view, the economy is represented more accurately by his own flow-fund model of production (see above).

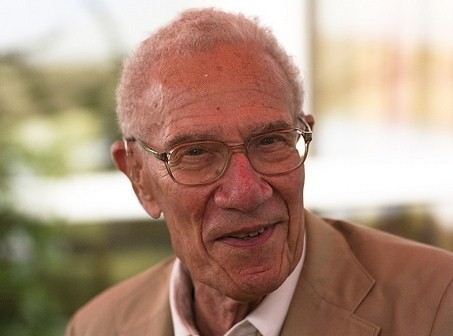
Solow was a leading growth theorist in the neoclassical tradition.

In addition, Georgescu-Roegen finds that neoclassical economics tends to overlook, or, at best, to misrepresent the problem of how to allocate the exhaustible mineral resources between present and future generations. Georgescu-Roegen points out that the market mechanisms of supply and demand are systematically unable to work out the intergenerational allocation problem in a satisfactory way, since future generations are not, and cannot be, present on today's market. This anomaly of the market mechanisms – or ecological market failure – is described by Georgescu-Roegen as 'a dictatorship of the present over the future'. On this issue, notable economists and Nobel Prize laureates Robert Solow and Joseph Stiglitz, Georgescu-Roegen's two main adversaries in academia in the 1970s, have stated their account of the mainstream neoclassical approach to the economics of exhaustible resources: They both claim that across the board substitutability of man-made capital for natural capital constitutes a real possibility. Hence, any concern with intergenerational allocation of the mineral stock should be relaxed somewhat (according to Solow); or even ignored altogether (according to Stiglitz).

The position of Solow and Stiglitz (as well as other, like-minded theorists in the neoclassical tradition) was later termed 'weak sustainability' by environmental economist Kerry Turner.

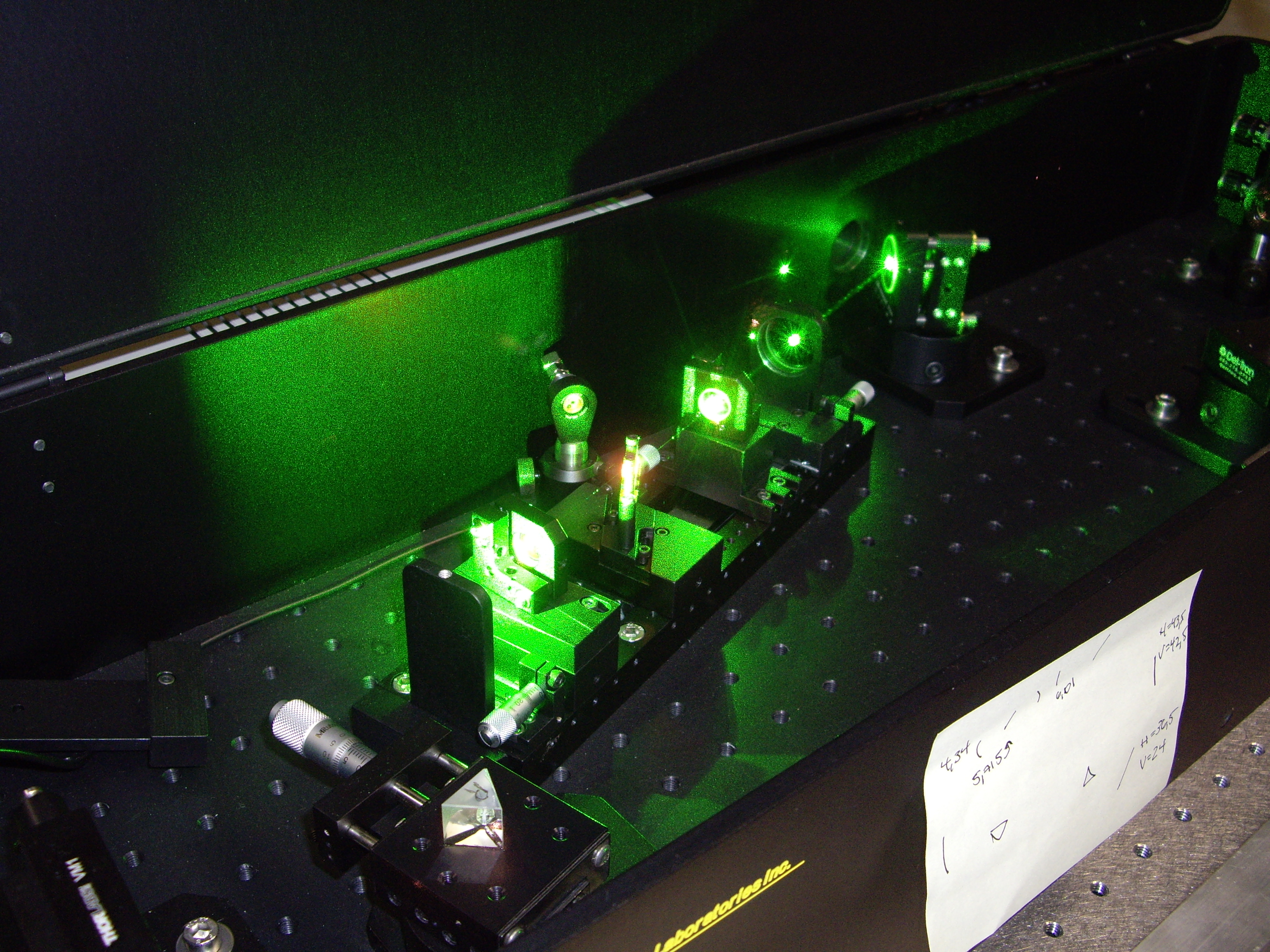
The Breit–Wheeler process represents the only known example of a process where energy (photons) is transformed into mass (positron-electron pairs); but even in this special experimental case, the resulting elementary particles cannot combine to form atomic structures having economic value. A process where pure energy is transformed into useful materials remains to be discovered.

In response to the position of Solow and Stiglitz, Georgescu-Roegen argues that neoclassical economists generally fail to realise the important difference between material resources and energy resources in the economic process. This is where his flow-fund model of production comes into play (see above). Georgescu-Roegen's point is that only material resources can be transformed into man-made capital. Energy resources, on the other hand, cannot be so transformed, as it is physically impossible to turn energy into matter, and matter is what man-made capital is made up of physically. The only possible role to be performed by energy resources is to assist – usually as fuel or electricity – in the process of transforming material resources into man-made capital. In Georgescu-Roegen's own terminology, energy may have the form of either a stock factor (mineral deposits in nature), or a flow factor (resources transformed in the economy); but never that of a fund factor (man-made capital in the economy). Hence, substituting man-made capital for energy resources is physically impossible.

Furthermore, not all material resources are transformed into man-made capital; instead, some material resources are manufactured directly into consumer goods having only a limited durability. Finally, in the course of time, all man-made capital depreciates, wears out and needs replacement; but both old and new man-made capital is made out of material resources to begin with. All in all, the economic process is indeed a process with steadily increasing entropy, and the 'mechanical' notion of across the board substitutability prevalent in neoclassical economics is untenable, Georgescu-Roegen submits.

Contrary to the neoclassical position, Georgescu-Roegen argues that flow factors and fund factors (that is, natural resources and man-made capital) are essentially complementary, since both are needed in the economic process in order to have a working economy. Georgescu-Roegen's conclusion, then, is that the allocation of exhaustible mineral resources between present and future generations is a large problem that cannot, and should not, be relaxed or ignored: "There seems to be no way to do away with the dictatorship of the present over the future, although we may aim at making it as bearable as possible." Georgescu-Roegen's followers and interpreters have since been discussing the existential impossibility of allocating earth's finite stock of mineral resources evenly among an unknown number of present and future generations. This number of generations is likely to remain unknown to us, as there is no way – or only little way – of knowing in advance if or when mankind will ultimately face extinction. In effect, any conceivable intertemporal allocation of the stock will inevitably end up with universal economic decline at some future point. This approach to mankind's prospects is absent in neoclassical economics.

The position of Georgescu-Roegen, including his criticism of neoclassical economics, was later termed 'strong sustainability' by Kerry Turner. Later still, Turner's taxonomy of 'weak' and 'strong' sustainability was integrated into ecological economics. However, contrary to the widely established use of Turner's simplifying taxonomy, Georgescu-Roegen never referred to his own position as 'strong sustainability' or any other variant of sustainability. Quite the opposite. Georgescu-Roegen flatly dismissed any notion of sustainable development as only so much 'snake oil' intended to deceive the general public. In his last years, he even denounced the notion bitterly as "one of the most toxic recipes for mankind": It is a gross contradiction in terms to speak of a 'sustainable' rate of extraction and use of a finite stock of non-renewable mineral resources – any rate will obviously reduce the remaining stock itself. Consequently, the Industrial Revolution as a whole has brought about unsustainable economic development in the world (see below).

==== Criticising Daly's steady-state economics ====
Leading ecological economist and steady-state theorist Herman Daly is a former student and protégé of Georgescu-Roegen. In the 1970s, Daly developed the concept of a steady-state economy, by which he understands an economy made up of a constant stock of physical wealth (man-made capital) and a constant stock of people (population), both stocks to be maintained by a minimal flow of natural resources (or 'throughput', as he terms it). Daly argues that this steady-state economy is both necessary and desirable in order to keep human environmental impact within biophysical limits (however defined), and to create more allocational fairness between present and future generations with regard to mineral resource use. In several articles, Georgescu-Roegen criticised his student's concept of a steady-state economy.

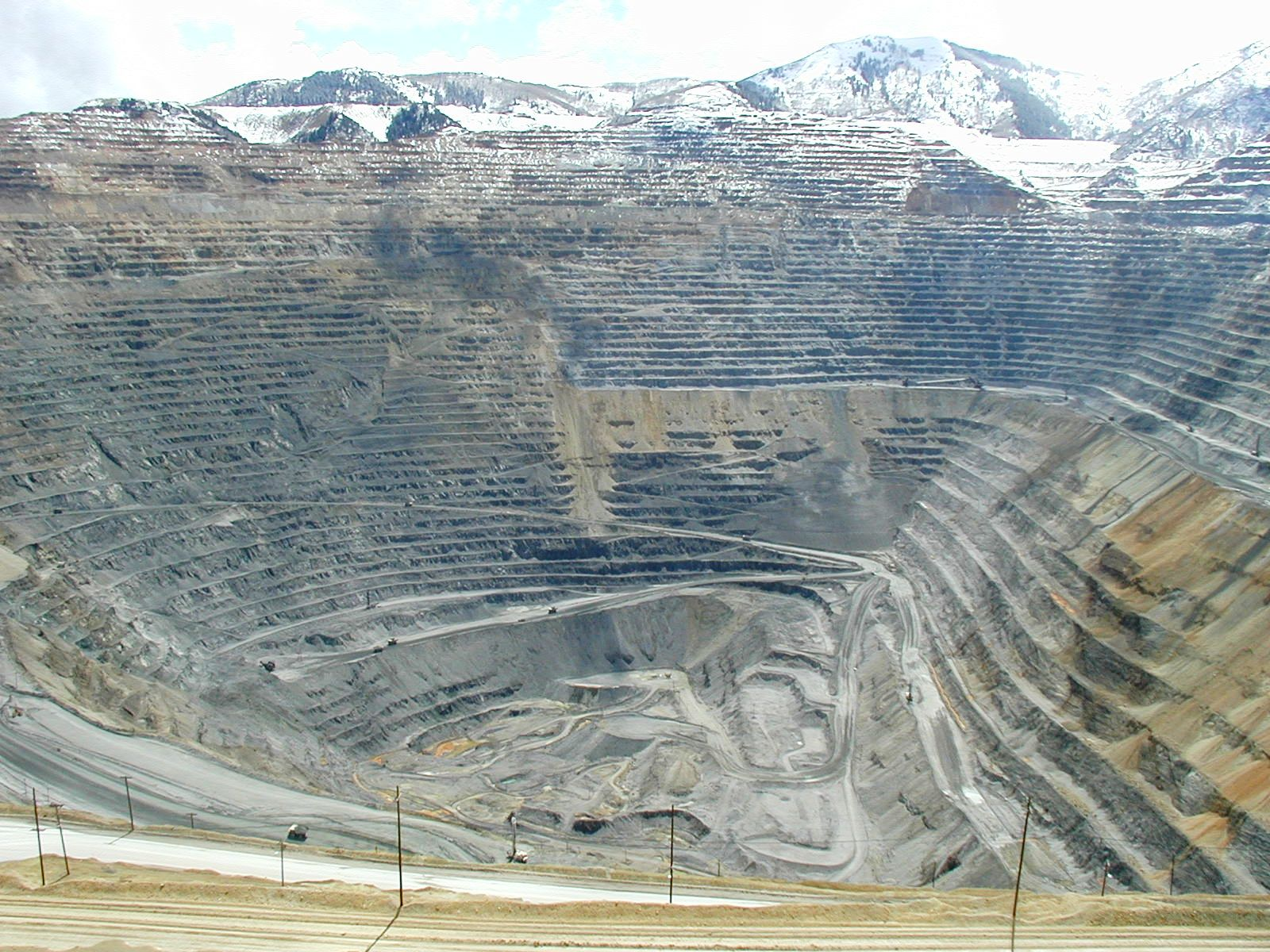
Mining activities are subject to diminishing returns.

Georgescu-Roegen argues that Daly's steady-state economy will provide no ecological salvation for mankind, especially not in the longer run. Due to the geologic fact that mineral ores are deposited and concentrated very unevenly in the crust of the earth, prospecting for and extraction of mineral resources will sooner or later be faced with the principle of diminishing returns, whereby extraction activities are pushed to still less accessible sites and still lower grades of ores. In the course of time, then, extraction costs and market prices of the incremental amount of resources will tend to increase. Eventually, all minerals will be exhausted, but the economic exhaustion will manifest itself long before the physical exhaustion provides the ultimate backstop for further activity: There will still be deposits of resources left in the crust, but the geologic concentration of these deposits will remain below the critical cutoff grade; hence, continued extraction will no longer pay off, and the market for these resources will then collapse. This long-term dynamics will work itself through any economic (sub-)system, regardless of the system's geographical location, its size and its state of development (whether a progressive, a steady or a declining state). In effect, the arguments advanced by Daly in support of his steady-state economy apply with even greater force in support of a declining-state economy, Georgescu-Roegen points out: When the overall purpose is to ration and stretch mineral resource use for as long time into the future as possible, zero economic growth is more desirable than growth is, true; but negative growth is better still! In this context, Georgescu-Roegen also criticises Daly for not specifying at what levels man-made capital and human population are to be kept constant in the steady-state.

Instead of Daly's steady-state economics, Georgescu-Roegen proposed his own so-called 'minimal bioeconomic program', featuring quantitative restrictions even more severe than those propounded by Daly. (Note: Among other issues, Georgescu-Roegen calls for the gradual lowering of world population to a level that can be adequately fed and sustained by organic farming only.)

Herman Daly on his part has readily accepted his teacher's judgement on this subject matter: In order to compensate for the principle of diminishing returns in mineral resource extraction, an ever greater share of capital and labour in the economy will gradually have to be transferred to the mining sector, thereby skewing the initial structure of any steady-state system. Even more important is it that the steady-state economy will serve only to postpone, and not to prevent, the inevitable mineral resource exhaustion anyway. "A steady-state economy cannot last forever, but neither can a growing economy, nor a declining economy", Daly concedes in his response to Georgescu-Roegen's criticism. In the same turn, Daly confirms Georgescu-Roegen's general argument that earth's carrying capacity is decreasing as mankind is extracting the finite mineral stock.

Likewise, several other economists in the field besides Georgescu-Roegen and Daly have agreed that a steady-state economy does not by itself constitute a long-term solution to the 'entropy problem' facing mankind.

==== Technology assessments in historical perspective ====
In his technology assessments, Georgescu-Roegen puts thermodynamic principles to use in a wider historical context, including the future of mankind.

According to Georgescu-Roegen's terminology, a technology is 'viable' only when it is able to return an energy surplus sufficiently large to maintain its own operation, plus some additional energy left over for other use. If this criterion is not met, the technology in question is only 'feasible' (if workable at all), but not 'viable'. Both viable and feasible technologies depend on a steady flow of natural resources for their operation.

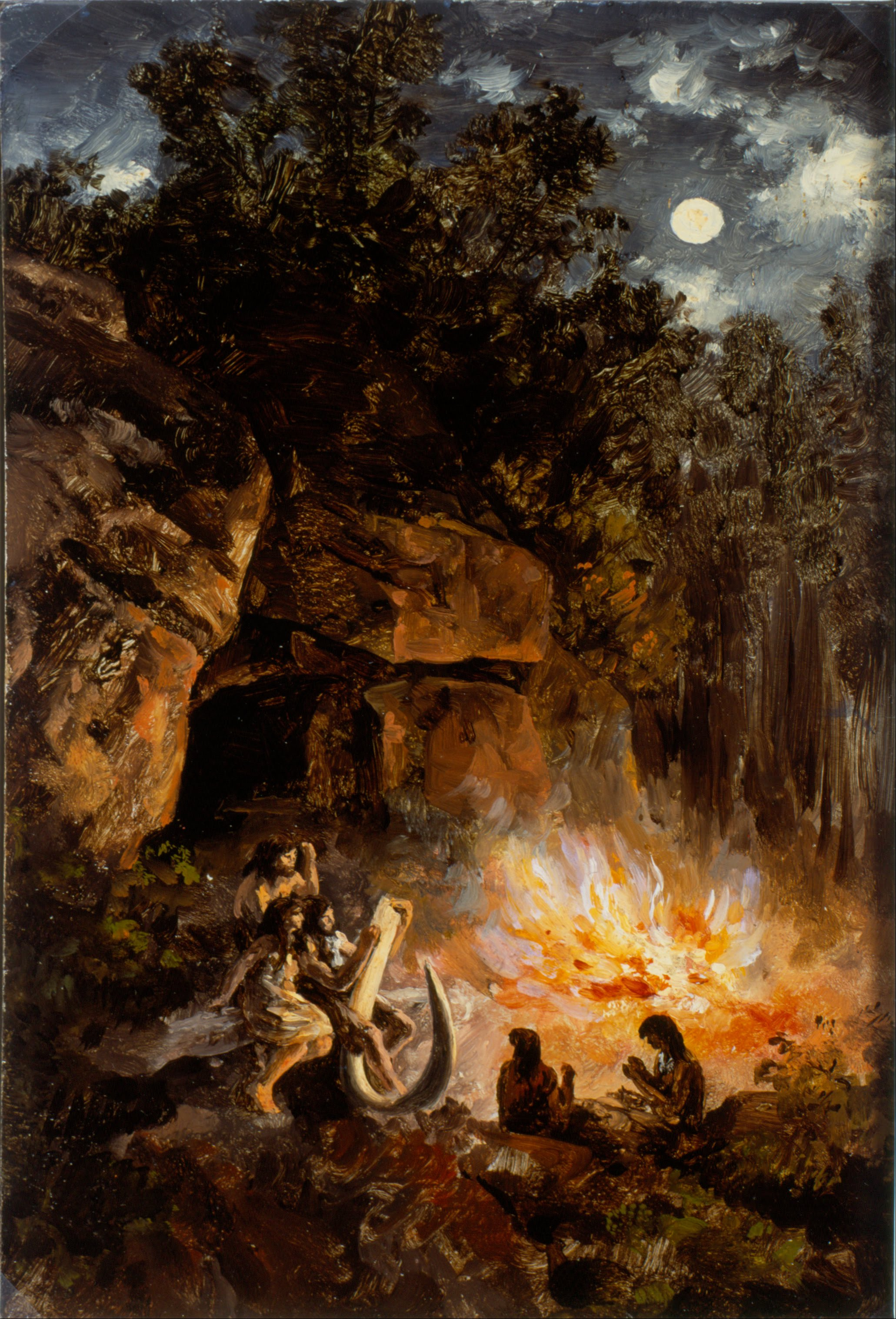
Prometheus I: The mastering of fire in the Palaeolithic Era.

Georgescu-Roegen argues that the first viable technology in human history was fire. By controlling fire, it was possible for man to burn a forest, or all forests. It was also possible to cook food and to obtain warmth and protection. Inspired by the ancient Greek myth of Prometheus, the Titan who stole fire from the gods and gave it to man, Georgescu-Roegen terms fire 'the first Promethean recipe'. According to Georgescu-Roegen, a later important Promethean recipe (technology) of the same (first) kind was animal husbandry, feeding on grass and other biomass (like fire does).

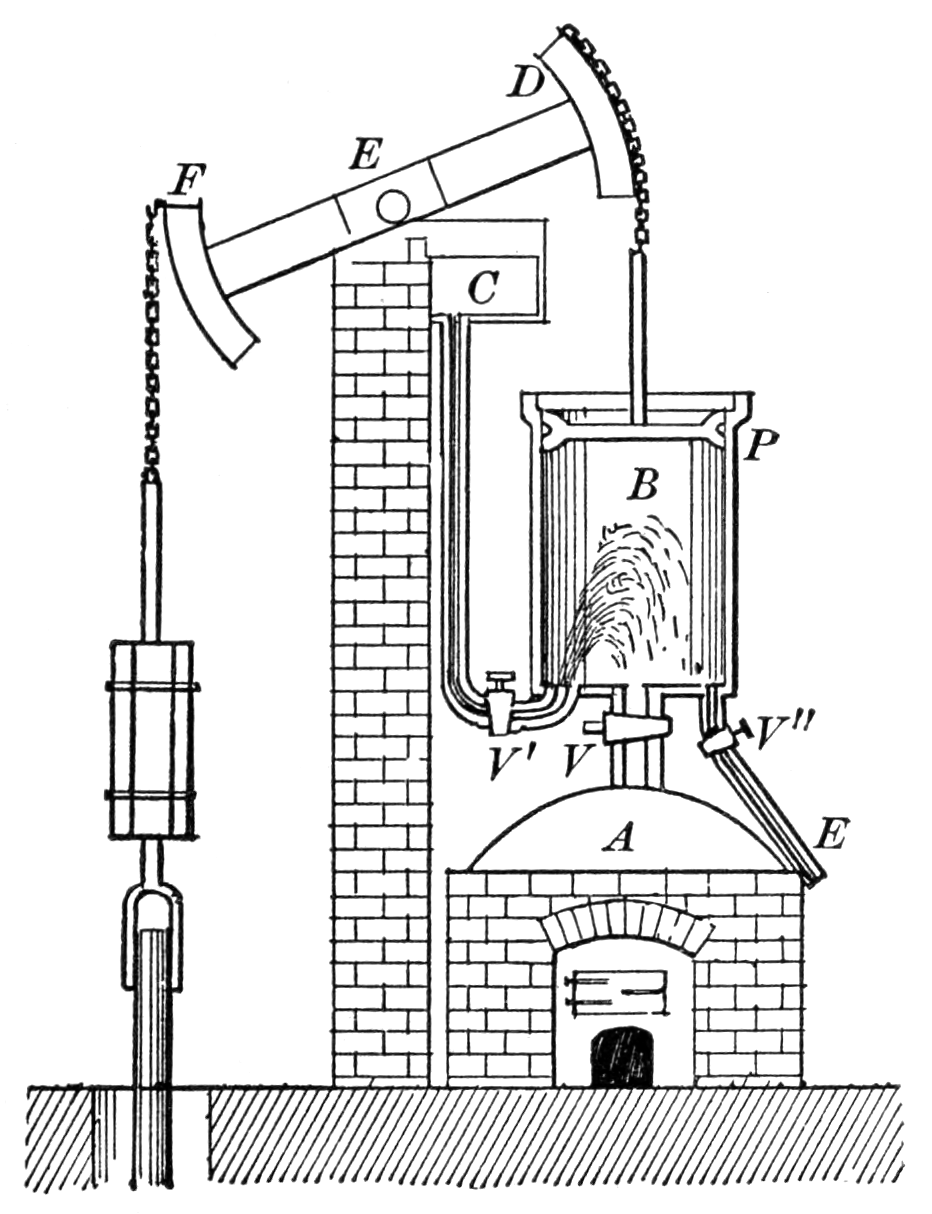
Prometheus II: The steam engine of the Industrial Revolution.

Much later in the history of man, the steam engine came about as the crucial Promethean recipe of the second kind, feeding on coal. The invention of the steam engine made it possible to drain the groundwater flooding the mine shafts, and the mined coal could then be used as fuel for other steam engines in turn. This technology propelled the Industrial Revolution in Britain in the second half of the 18th century, whereby man's economy has been thrust into a long, never-to-return overshoot-and-collapse trajectory with regard to the earth's mineral stock. Georgescu-Roegen lists the internal combustion engine and the nuclear fission reactor as other, later examples of Promethean recipes of the second kind, namely heat engines feeding on a mineral fuel (oil and uranium (plus thorium), respectively).

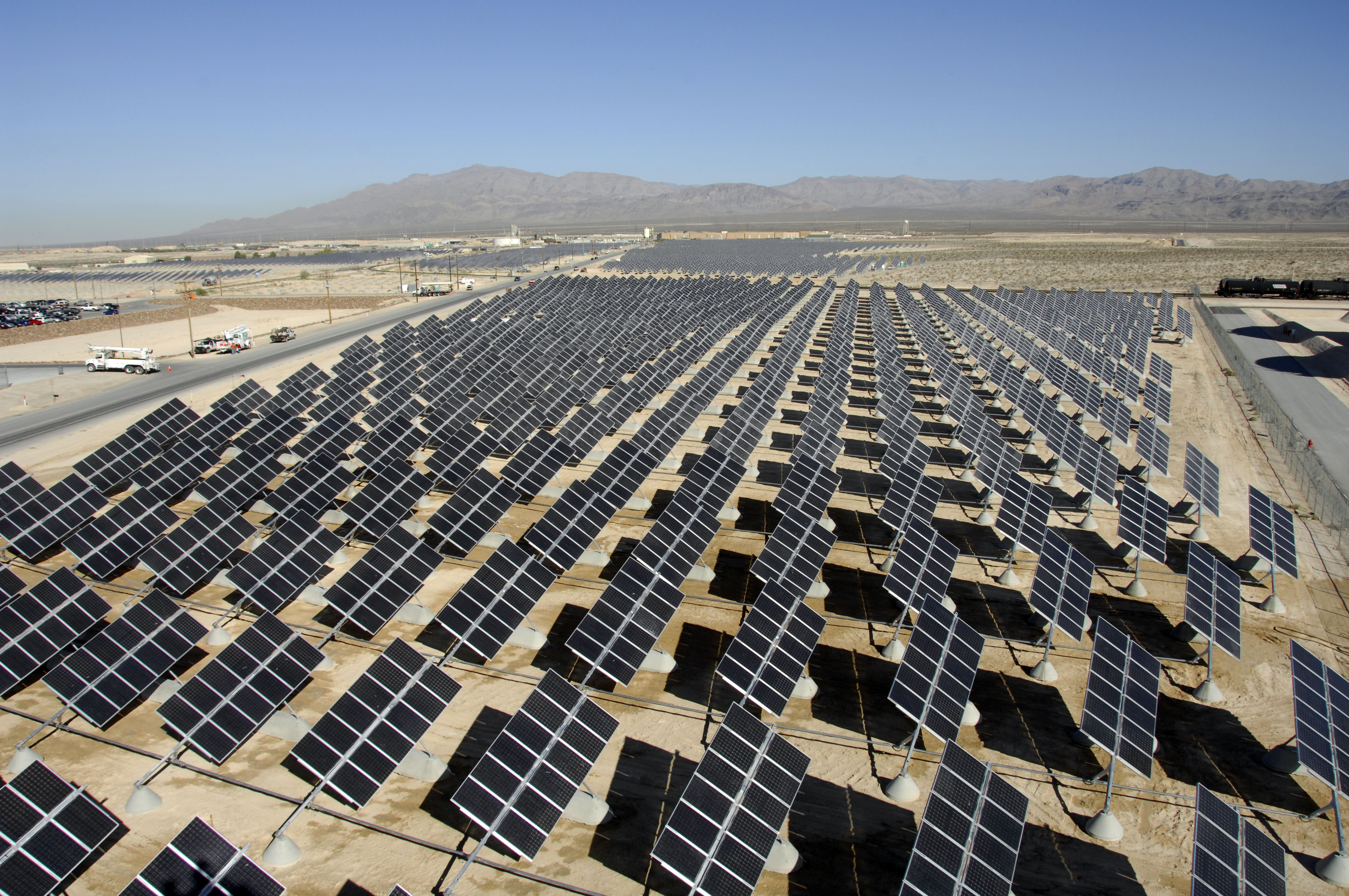
Prometheus III: Solar collectors returning a sufficiently large energy output. Georgescu-Roegen believed that no technology of this kind was yet around in the world in his day.

By a Promethean recipe of the third kind, Georgescu-Roegen understands a solar collector returning a net energy output sufficiently large to supply all the energy input needed to manufacture an additional solar collector of the same kind, thereby constituting a full serial reproduction with regard to solar energy only. The fact that solar collectors of various kinds had been in operation on a substantial scale for more than a century without providing a breakthrough in energy efficiency brought Georgescu-Roegen to the conclusion that no Promethean recipe was yet around in the world in his day. Only feasible recipes for solar collectors were available, functioning like what he labelled 'parasites' with regard to the terrestrial inputs of energy for their manufacture and operation – and like any other parasite, these recipes cannot survive their host (the 'host' being the sources of the terrestrial inputs). Georgescu-Roegen believed that for a worldwide solar-powered economy to be truly energy self-supporting, a Promethean kind of solar collector had yet to be invented. Later, some scholars have argued that the efficiency of solar collectors has increased considerably since Georgescu-Roegen made these assessments.

Georgescu-Roegen further points out that regardless of the efficiency of any particular kind of solar collector, the major drawback of solar power per se when compared to terrestrial fossil fuels and uranium (plus thorium) is the diffuse, low-intensity property of solar radiation. Hence, a lot of material equipment is needed as inputs at the surface of the earth to collect, concentrate and (when convenient) store or transform the radiation before it can be put to use on a larger industrial scale. This necessary material equipment adds to the 'parasitical' operation of solar power, Georgescu-Roegen maintains.

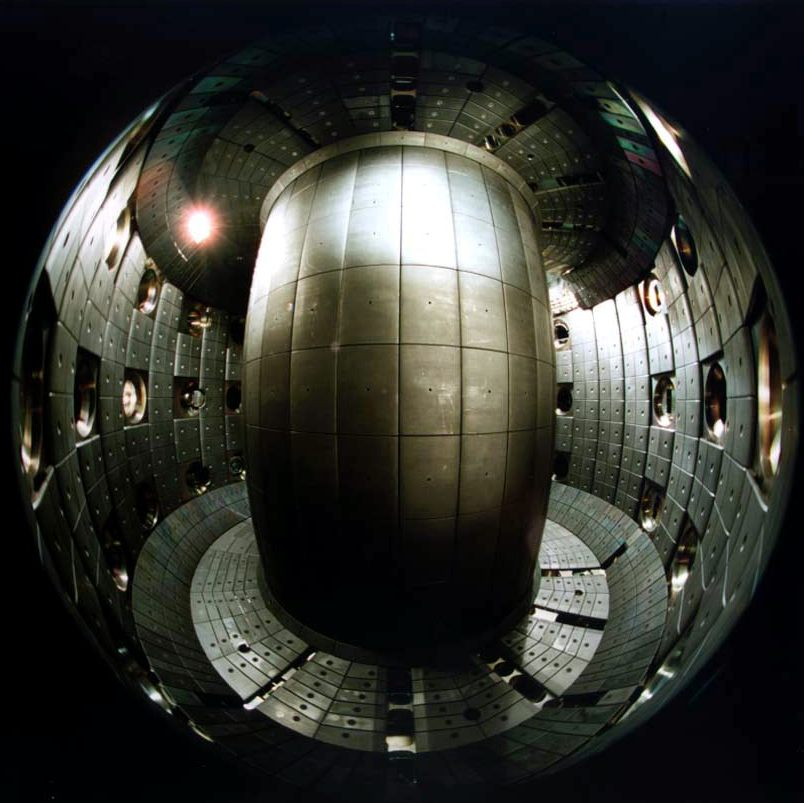
By the 1990s, the technology of fusion power was still in the making. The research & development continues today...

Assessing fusion power as a possible future source of energy, Georgescu-Roegen ventured the opinion that, regarding magnetic confinement fusion, no reactor will ever be built to be large enough to effectively withstand and confine the vehement thermal pressure of the plasmic deuterium/tritium fusion processes through an extended period of time (which is a prerequisite for the 'viability' of this technology). He did not assess the other one of the two major fusion power technologies being researched in his day – and still being researched – namely inertial confinement fusion.

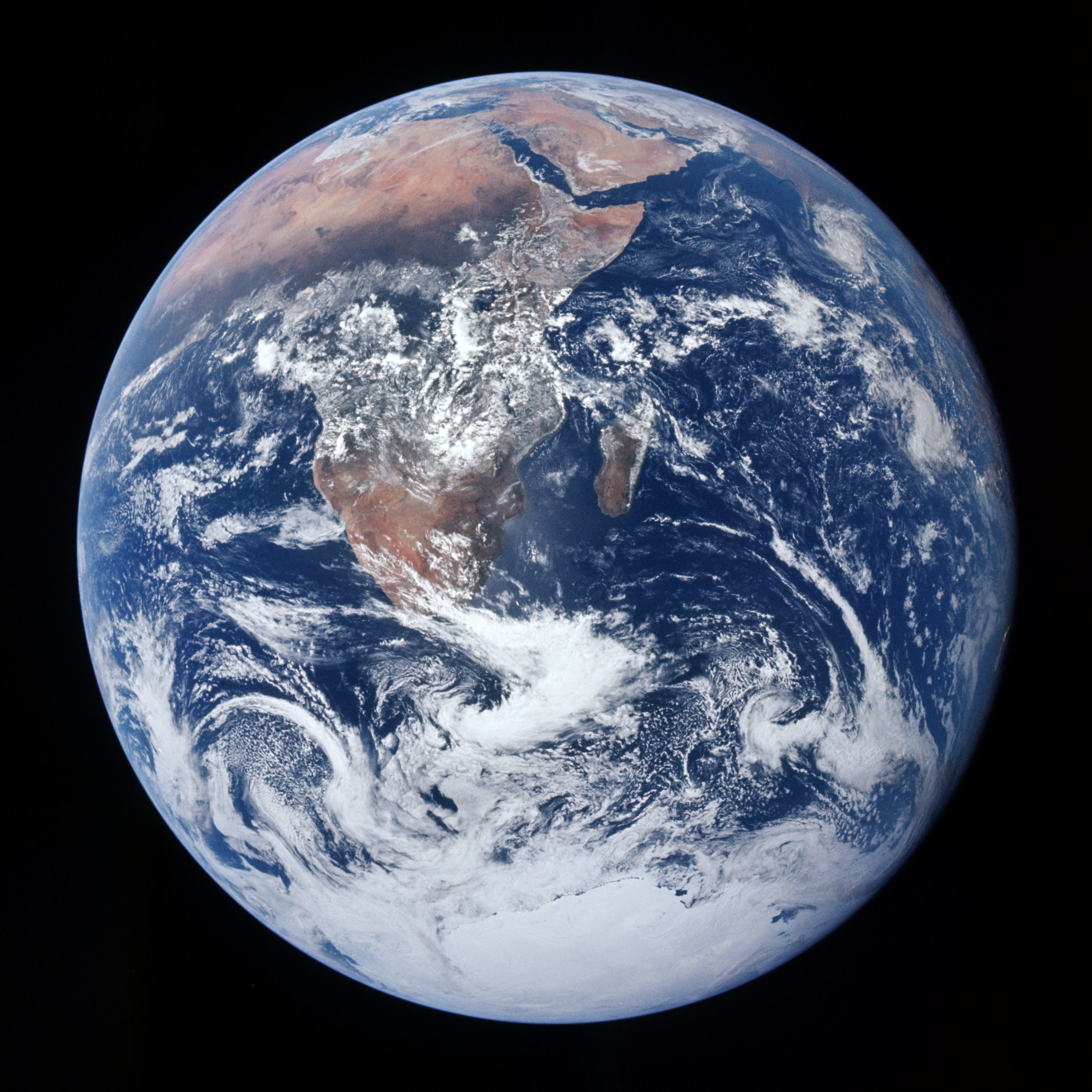
Will mankind remain confined to earth forever ... ?

All of these technology assessments have to do with energy resources only, and not with material resources. Georgescu-Roegen stressed the point that even with the proliferation of solar collectors throughout the surface of the globe, or the advent of fusion power, or both, any industrial economy will still depend on a steady flow of material resources extracted from the crust of the earth, notably metals. He repeatedly argued his case that in the (far) future, it will be scarcity of terrestrial material resources, and not of energy resources, that will prove to impose the most binding constraint on man's economy on earth. As he held no space advocacy views, Georgescu-Roegen failed to assess the (still) emerging technology of asteroid mining or any other known type of space colonisation as potentials for compensating for this future scarcity constraint facing mankind: He was convinced that throughout its entire span of existence, our species will remain confined solely to earth for all practical purposes. His paradigmatic vision concluded thereby.

== Controversies ==
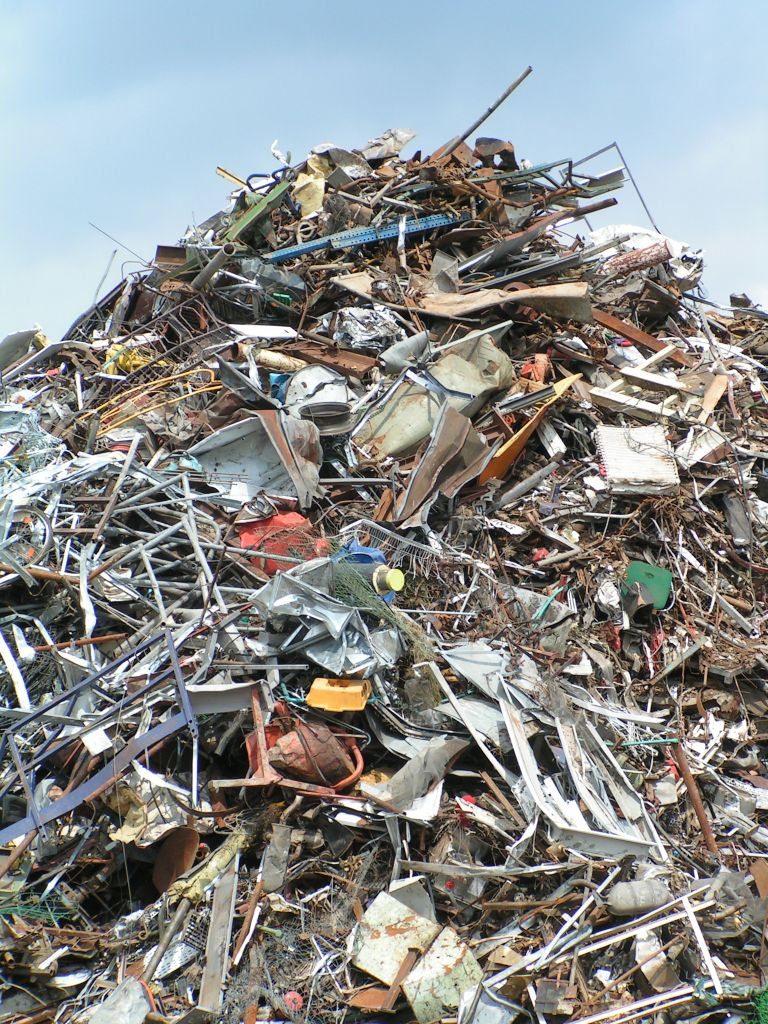
The entropy law does not apply to material resources.

Georgescu-Roegen's work was blemished somewhat by mistakes caused by his insufficient understanding of the physical science of thermodynamics. While working on The Entropy Law and the Economic Process (see above), Georgescu-Roegen had the firm understanding that the entropy law applies equally well to both energy resources and to material resources, and much of the reasoning in the opus rests on this understanding; but, regrettably for Georgescu-Roegen, this understanding was – and still is – false: In thermodynamics proper, the entropy law does apply to energy, but not to matter of macroscopic scale (that is, not to material resources). (Note: Although the entropy law does not apply to matter of macroscopic scale, it does apply to microscopic matter, per the kinetic theory of gases.) Later, when Georgescu-Roegen realised his mistake, his reaction passed through several stages of contemplation and refinement, ultimately leading to his formulation of a new physical law, namely the fourth law of thermodynamics. This fourth law states that complete recycling of matter is impossible. (Note: The third law of thermodynamics states that the entropy of a system approaches a constant value as the temperature approaches zero. This third law had long since been firmly established in physics when Georgescu-Roegen realised his mistake about the second law (entropy law). Hence, Georgescu-Roegen chose to enumerate his new law as the fourth one in the line, although at this point the Onsager reciprocal relations had been enumerated thus already.) The purpose of Georgescu-Roegen's proposed fourth law was to substantiate his initial claim that not only energy resources, but also material resources, are subject to general and irreversible physical degradation when put to use in economic activity. In addition, he introduced the term 'material entropy' to describe this physical degradation of material resources.

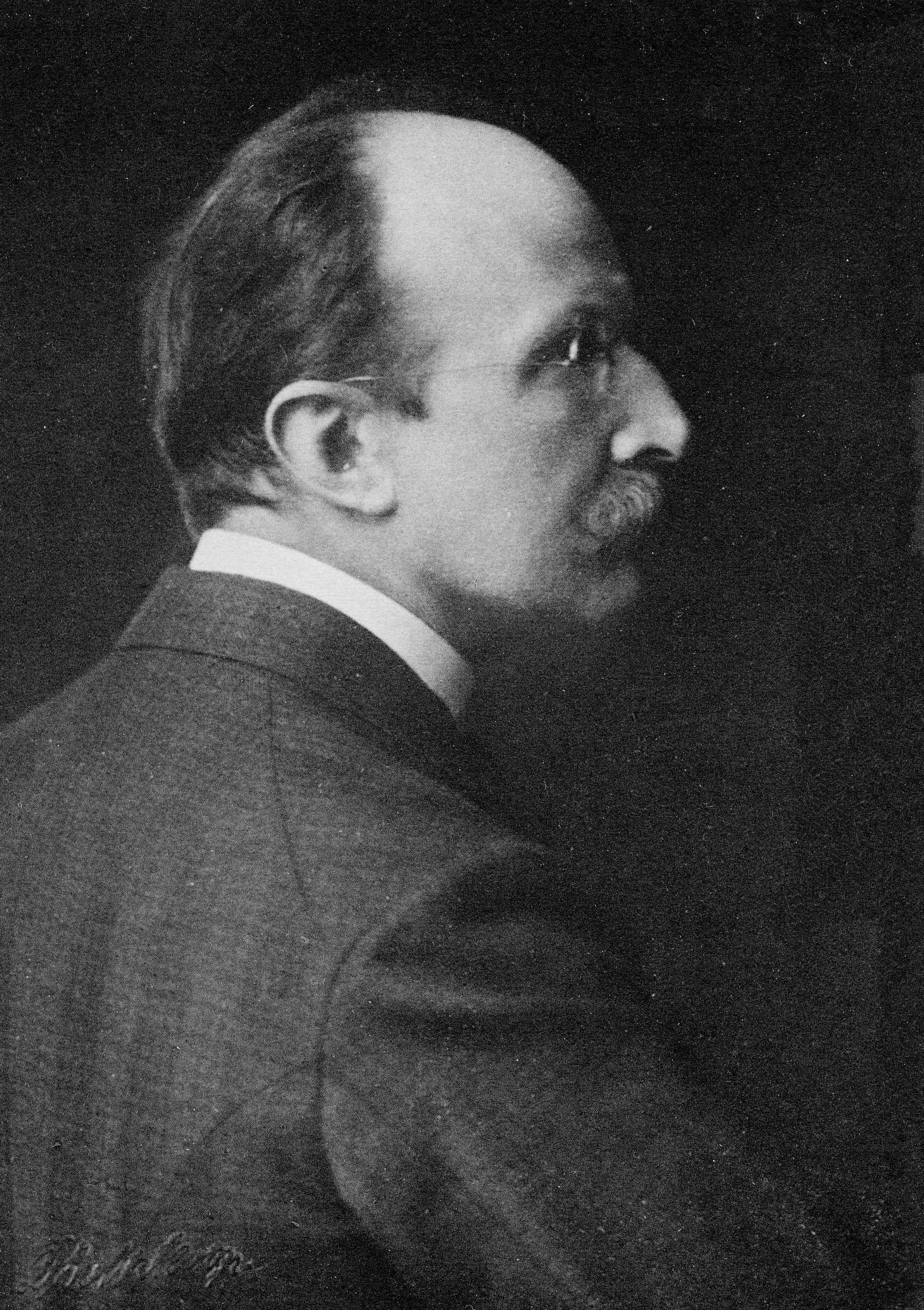
Planck had used the concept of 'matter dissipation' in some of his work.

Georgescu-Roegen himself was not confident about this tentative solution to the problem. He remained embarrassed that he had misinterpreted, and consequently, overstretched the proper application of the physical law that formed part of the title of his magnum opus. He conceded that he had entered into the science of thermodynamics as something of a bold novice. Dedicated to interdisciplinarity, he was worried that physicists would dismiss all of his work as amateurism on this count. The predicament would trouble him for the rest of his life. In his last published article on the subject matter before his death, Georgescu-Roegen recollected his encouragement when he had once earlier come across the concept of 'matter dissipation' used by German physicist and Nobel Prize laureate Max Planck to account for the existence of irreversible physical processes where no simultaneous transformation of energy was taking place. Georgescu-Roegen found consolation in the belief that the concept of 'matter dissipation' used by a physicist of Planck's authoritative standing would decisively substantiate his own fourth law and his own concept of material entropy.

Georgescu-Roegen's formulation of a fourth law of thermodynamics and the concept of material entropy soon generated some controversy, involving both physicists and ecological economists.

A full chapter on the economics of Georgescu-Roegen reviews this controversy and has approvingly been included in one elementary physics textbook on the historical development of thermodynamics, and the details (Georgescu-Roegen's mistakes) about the fourth law and material entropy are omitted there.

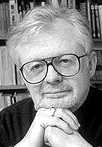
Ayres countered Georgescu-Roegen's pessimism and argued in favour of a 'spaceship economy'.

Modelling a possible future economic system for mankind, Robert Ayres has countered Georgescu-Roegen's position on the impossibility of complete and perpetual recycling of material resources. According to Ayres, it is possible to develop what he conceptualises as a 'spaceship economy' on earth on a stable and permanent basis, provided that a sufficient flow of energy is available to support it (for example, by an ample supply of solar energy). In this spaceship economy, all waste materials will be temporarily discarded and stored in inactive reservoirs – or what he calls 'waste baskets' – before being recycled and returned to active use in the economic system at some later point in time. It will not be necessary, or even possible, for materials recycling to form its own separate and continuous flow to be of use – only, the waste baskets in question have to be large enough to compensate for the rate and the efficiency of the recycling effort. In effect, complete and perpetual recycling of material resources will be possible in a future spaceship economy of this kind specified, thereby rendering obsolete Georgescu-Roegen's proposed fourth law of thermodynamics, Ayres submits. In a later article, Ayres restated his case for a spaceship economy.

In ecological economics, Ayres' contribution vis-à-vis Georgescu-Roegen's proposed fourth law was since described as yet another instance of the so-called 'energetic dogma': Earlier, Georgescu-Roegen had attached the label 'energetic dogma' to various theorists holding the view that only energy resources, and not material resources, are the constraining factor in all economic activity. (Note: The subject of 'energetics' itself originated in the second half of the 19th century.)

== Prizes and awards ==
=== The Georgescu-Roegen Prize ===
Each year since 1987, the Georgescu-Roegen Prize has been awarded by the Southern Economic Association for the best academic article published in the Southern Economic Journal.

=== The Georgescu-Roegen Annual Awards ===
In 2012, two awards in honour of Georgescu-Roegen's life and work were established by The Energy and Resources Institute in New Delhi, India: The Georgescu-Roegen Annual Awards. The awards were officially announced on Georgescu-Roegen's 106th birth anniversary. The awards have two categories: The award for 'unconventional thinking' is presented for scholarly work in academia, and the award for 'bioeconomic practice' is presented for initiatives in politics, business and grassroots organisations.

Japanese ecological economist Kozo Mayumi, a student of Georgescu-Roegen from 1984 to 1988, was the first to receive the award in the 'unconventional thinking' category. Mayumi was awarded for his work on energy analysis and hierarchy theory.

== Famous quotes ==
- "'Bigger and better' motorcycles, automobiles, jet planes, refrigerators, etc., necessarily cause not only 'bigger and better' depletion of natural resources, but also 'bigger and better' pollution."
- "William Petty was right in teaching that 'Nature is the mother and labour is the father of all wealth' — only, he should have said '... of our existence'."
- "Will mankind listen to any program that implies a constriction of its addiction to exosomatic comfort? Perhaps, the destiny of man is to have a short, but fiery, exciting and extravagant life rather than a long, uneventful and vegetative existence. Let other species — the amoebas, for example — which have no social ambitions whatever inherit an Earth still bathed in plenty of sunshine."

== See also ==
- Ecological economics
- Degrowth movement: Lasting influence on
- Steady-state economy: Herman Daly's concept of it
- The Limits to Growth
- Carrying capacity
- Human overpopulation
- Peak minerals
- Market failure: Ecological market failure
- Sustainable development: Critique
- The Energy and Resources Institute (TERI)
- Entropy
- Heat death of the universe
- Pessimism: Philosophical pessimism
