= Lester W. Milbrath =

Lester Walter Milbrath
- Born: 29 October 1925; Bertha, Minnesota, United States
- Died: 26 December 2007 (aged 82); Amherst, New York, United States
- Resting place: Forest Lawn Cemetery (Buffalo)
- Education: BA and MA University of Minnesota, PhD University of North Carolina at Chapel Hill

Lester Walter Milbrath (29 October 1925 – 26 December 2007) was an American environmentalist and professor of Political science, who taught at SUNY Buffalo from 1965 to 1991. During his academic career, he taught abroad on sabbaticals and Fulbright scholarships in Poland, Norway, Denmark, Taiwan and Australia. He also taught at the University of California, Irvine from 1992 to 1994.

== Biography ==
=== Early life ===
Les Milbrath was born in Bertha, Minnesota on 29 October 1925, the son of Walter Rudolph and Lila Henrietta Milbrath. He grew up on his parents’ farm in Todd County, Minnesota. In 1945, he enlisted in the United States Navy, serving as an electrician on the USS General H. W. Butner (AP-113) and a Landing Craft Infantry ship (LCIL-820).

After the war, he earned bachelor's and master's degrees from the University of Minnesota, graduating Phi Beta Kappa. He received a doctoral degree in political science from the University of North Carolina at Chapel Hill in 1956.

=== Career ===
After his graduation, Milbrath held a research fellowship at the Brookings Institution. He then taught at Duke University, Northwestern University, and the University at Buffalo, where he spent most of his career.

Milbrath joined the Department of Political Science at University at Buffalo in 1966, which had a newly established doctoral program in political science. (He also held a joint appointment in the Department of sociology beginning in 1987.) He continued to write 80-plus chapters and papers in political science journals or edited books. He regularly taught undergraduate and graduate courses on political psychology, political attitudes and behavior, and research methodology.

Between 1969 and 1976, Milbrath directed the campus-based Social Science Measurement Center and the Social Science Research Institute between and served as the associate provost of the Faculty of Social Sciences and Administration during the same period of time. Between 1976 and 1987 he headed the Environmental Studies Center, and he later directed the Research Program in Environment and Society, which focused on the issues of the sustainability of future societies, environmental beliefs and values, public policy, political beliefs, social measurement and social change. He also served as a fellow of the Rockefeller Institute of Government.

=== Retirement ===
Milbrath retired from teaching at University at Buffalo in 1991. Milbrath spent three winter quarters teaching and lecturing at the University of California, Irvine.

In 1997, Milbrath received the Lifetime Achievement Award from the American Political Science Association. The award was presented, said an APSA spokesperson, in recognition of Milbrath’s "distinguished lifetime achievement in scholarship, teaching and advancement of the field of ecological and transformational politics."

On October 11, 2001, he received a Lifetime Environmental Achievement Award from the University at Buffalo Environment and Society Institute. In addition to the award, the Institute established The Lester W. Milbrath Environment and Society Institute Fellowship in his honor for a graduate student .

Milbrath died Wednesday, December 26, 2007 at Canterbury Woods in Amherst, New York.

== Work ==
=== The Washington Lobbyists, 1963 ===
In 1963, while at Northwestern University, Milbrath published The Washington Lobbyists. Building upon his early interest in the role money plays in politics, he sought to analyze and explain the influence of lobbyists on congressional actors in Washington, D.C. Very little empirical research had been conducted on them before that time. The Washington Lobbyists was considered a path breaking work. Much to the surprise of political scientists at the time, his survey suggested that lobbyists exerted little influence and, instead, were a critical source of information for legislators. Exactly how lobbyists communicated with legislators was a focus of Milbrath's study.

=== Other publications ===
In 1965, he published Participation: How and Why do People Get Involved in Politics. It examined the literature on citizen political participation, organizing empirical findings reported in previous studies. The book became widely cited, prompting him to co-author a second, substantially updated edition of the volume in 1977 with M. Lal Goel

The topics of environmental beliefs and values, and environmental policy making became a research focus for Milbrath throughout the remainder of his career. In addition to his numerous journal articles and book chapters, he published Environmentalists: Vanguard for a New Society (SUNY Series in Environmental Public Policy) State University of New York Press 1985 ISBN 978-0873958882 in 1984. This book compared and contrasted the attitudes, values, and perceptions of environmentalists with those of the "rearguard," a group of people who embrace the dominant social paradigm of economic growth at any cost. The book, based on extensive survey data, received a great deal of acclaim by political scientists and scholars in environmental studies.

He tackled the problem of sustainable development in Envisioning a Sustainable Society: Learning Our Way Out? State University of New York Press ISBN 978-0791401637. As with his previous books, this one received very favorable reviews.

After his retirement Milbrath continued to write, and to testify in public settings on environmental matters. In 1996 he published Learning to Think Environmentally: While There is Still Time with a foreword by David T. Suzuki, In the book, he utilized a fictional conversation with a neighbor about important environmental issues and what we must do to develop a sustainable society. Time is running short, he told the neighbor, and we must act now. Unlike his previous publications, this book was intended for reading by the general populace. At first, SUNY Press was reluctant to publish the book because of its nontraditional approach. However, it has been widely adopted in many environmental studies, policy, and politics courses.

== Books ==
- Personality Correlates of Political Participation. Written with Walter W. Klein. 1962
- The Washington Lobbyists. 1963
- Measuring the Personalities of Lobbyists. Northwestern University, Program of Graduate Training and Research in Political Behavior.
- Political Participation: How and why Do People Get Involved in Politics?. 1965
- The Politics of Environmental Policy. 1975 Sage Publications, 1975.
- An Extra Dimension of Representation in Water Quality Planning: A Survey Study of Erie and Niagara Counties, New York 1976. 1977 publisher=State University of New York at Buffalo.
- Environmental Quality and Quality of Life. 1977. Environmental Studies Center|location=State University of New York at Buffalo
- Some Methodological and Conceptual Problems of Measuring and Explaining Quality of Life and Quality of Environment. 1977
- Political Participation: How and why Do People Get Involved in Politics?. Revised 2nd Edition. M. Lal Goel (Editor). 1977
- Citizen Surveys as Citizen Participation Mechanisms. Nelson A. Rockefeller Institute of Government, 1982
- Citizen Participation in Government Decision Making: The Toxic Waste Threat at Love Canal, Niagara Falls, New York. Written with L. Gardner Shaw. 1983 Nelson A. Rockefeller Institute of Government, State University of New York
- Public Decision-making with Regard to Managing Major Natural Resources. Nelson A. Rockefeller Institute of Government|location=State University of New York
- Environmentalists, Vanguard for a New Society (SUNY Series in Environmental Public Policy)]. 1985
- Envisioning a Sustainable Society (SUNY Series, Environmental Public Policy)] . 1989 ISBN 9780791401620
- An Inquiry Into Environmental Education: Levels of Knowledge, Awareness and Concerns Among New York State High School Students. Written with Kathryn M. Hausbeck and Sean M. Enright. Research Program in Environment and Society|location=State University of New York at Buffalo, 1990
- Learning to Think Environmentally While There Is Still Time. 1996
