= Mauro Bonaiuti =

Italian economist and teacher

Mauro Bonaiuti, PhD, teaches Ecological economics on the Master's on Socio-Environmental Sustainability and Solidarity Economy and Sustainability programme at the University of Turin. He is co-founder of the Italian Degrowth Association and among the promoters of the Italian Solidarity Economy Network.

Appreciated as one of the most notable experts on the bioeconomics theory of Nicholas Georgescu-Roegen, Bonaiuti is the editor of 'From Bioeconomics to Degrowth' (2011), a collection of papers by Georgescu-Roegen published by Routledge.

Following on from his books on bioeconomics, Bonaiuti's latest monograph is entitled 'The Great Transition' (Routledge 2014). Tapping into the intuitions of several early twentieth-century biologists, and in particular Joseph Tainter's analysis of the collapse of complex societies, Bonaiuti puts forward the theory that advanced capitalist societies have been entering, and ever more so since the 1970s, a phase of "diminishing marginal returns."

Bonaiuti's research began in 2006 with the gathering of a large quantity of empirical evidence from various disciplines. It offers an original interpretation of the phenomenon of so-called 'secular stagnation', or, as someone has also termed it, 'the end of growth'. Nearly ten years on from the Great Recession, notwithstanding that the panic has dispelled and the financial markets have started to recover, there is still no clear evidence of a return to growth in the West.

As illustrated in his book, this is not linked to normal oscillations in the economic cycle, but rather is systemic in nature, and in particular is connected to the growing complexity of social organizations (military forces, bureaucracies, health services, education, research). Bonaiuti says the West's failure to return to growth is also linked to the fall in yields of its new tertiary economy as well as to increasing costs of energy and raw materials. In other words, it is a process that is, by nature, progressive and one that takes place over a longer period of time. This would go to explain the impotence and ineffectiveness of remedial measures that have been adopted until today, all born of traditional forms of economic policy.

== Works ==
- Georgescu-Roegen, N. (2011). Bonaiuti, Mauro (ed.). From Bioeconomics to Degrowth: Georgescu-Roegen's 'New Economics' in Eight Essays. Taylor and Francis. ISBN 9781136822162.
- Bonaiuti, Mauro (2014). The Great Transition. Routledge Studies in Ecological Economics. Taylor and Francis. ISBN 9781317820284.

== See also ==
- Nicholas Georgescu-Roegen
- Thermoeconomics
- Degrowth
