= James C. Coomer =

American political scientist

James C. Coomer (born May 20, 1939) is an American political scientist and Emeritus Professor of Political Science at Mercer University, and its former Senior Vice President for Academic Affairs. He is known for his early work on the conceptual foundations of the notion of the sustainable society.

== Biography ==
Born in Evansville, Indiana in 1939, Coomer obtained his PhD in Political Science in Public Policy from the University of Tennessee-Knoxville in 1975 with the thesis, entitled "Public Administration and Organizational Behavior. American Government and Politics."

Coomer had started his academic career at the University of Tennessee-Knoxville. After his graduation he was appointed Associate Professor in Public Affairs at the University of Houston, where he was chairman of its Studies of the Future program. Later he moved to Mercer University, where he spend the rest of his career. There Coomer served as Professor of Political Science and as Senior Vice President for Academic Affairs. After his retirement he was appointed Emeritus Professor of Political Science, and published some poetry. His research interests in those days were in the fields of anticipatory governance, both policy making and impact assessments; and the legislative process.

Coomer also served as staff officer to the Mayor of a large metropolitan city and to a US Senator in Washington, D.C. In 1991 he was awarded the Best Fictional Short Story by the Gulf Coast Writers Association for his short story "Destiny."

== Work ==
Coomer's early research interests were in the field of "social and political consequences of rapid change in the society; where to look for them and how to plan them."

=== The Quest for a Sustainable Society ===
In 1979 Coomer edited the volume "The Quest for a Sustainable Society," with contributions by Coomer, Paul R. Ehrlich, Arthur A. Few Jr., Michael Gibbons, Tom Stonier, Robert L. Chianese, James Garbarino, Anne H. Ehrlich, George Modelski, Dillard B. Tinsley, Edward T. Clark Jr. and W. John Coletta, David Hopcraft, and Kathryn Cousins.

In his first essay "The Nature of the Quest for a Sustainable Society," Coomer introduced the concept of a sustainable society as a thing man inevitably encounters:

One of the unique qualities that separates man from the other animals on this planet is his capacity for self- transcendence: the ability to make himself his own object. Man can stand "outside himself" and evaluate where he has been and in which direction he is moving. He can assess the impact upon those things which are around hima and can adapt to changes either self-generated or externally imposed. Those changes in man's environment that are self-generated can be examined to determine if the changes are beneficial or detrimental to his existence. If beneficial, the change is held to be an advancement; if detrimental, a catastrophe. In his capacity to transcend himself, man has learned that some changes in his environment which were once embraced as beneficial have, over time, become catastrophic. Upon learning this, man has attempted to find an equitable relationship with the physical environment so that he will not generate changes that may seriously impair that which sustains him. Seeking that equitable relationship is the perpetual for a sustainable society..."

Subsequently, Coomer explained a series of attributes of the sustainable society:

[The] sustainable society is one that lives within the self-perpetuating limits of its environment. That society, contrary to some popular opinion, is not a "no-growth" society. It is, rather, a society that recognizes the limits of growth. It is not a society that continues to seek alternatives to growth. It is, rather, a society that l0oks for alternative ways of growing.
The sustainable society recognizes that there is one primary environment - the physical environment - within which all other environments function. All other environments - political, social, economic, to name three major ones - exist within and act upon the primary environment.

=== Picture of businesses in a sustainable society ===
In the 1979 volume "The Quest for a Sustainable Society" Dillard B. Tinsley presented the essay "Business Organizations in the Sustainable Society", in which he stipulated the need for a clear picture of how businesses will operate in a sustainable society. Tinsley (1979) wrote:

"Successful transition to a sustainable society will require meaningful participation by all segments of society. If the varied talents and resources of the business community are to be effectively mobilized in this transition, business managers must be given a clear picture of how businesses will operate in a sustainable society. It is not enough to assert that the economy as a whole will be structured in a particular manner or that resources will be allocated according to certain priorities. Business managers desire to know how the values, goals, and operations of their organizations will be affected. How will business interact with its customers?"

There was a main problem with the state of business process modelling in those days, which Tinsley (1979) underlined: "At present, the limited models of business operations in a sustainable society do not address these questions regarding specific employee and customer interactions." A new characterization was needed to picture the operations of the business organization in a sustainable society. One of the scientists that would go down this road is the Swedish organizational theorist Håkan Håkansson.

== Selected publications ==
- Coomer, James C., and Charlie B. Tyer. Nashville metropolitan government: The first decade. Bureau of Public Administration, University of Tennessee, 1974.
- James C. Coomer ed. (1979) Quest for a Sustainable Society: Pergamon Policy Studies on Business and Economics. New York: Pergamon Press; Republished Elsevier, 2016.

Articles, a selection

- Hill, Kim Quaile; Coomer, James C. (December 1977). "Local politicians and their attitudes to planning". Long Range Planning. 10 (6): 57–61. doi:10.1016/0024-6301(77)90009-7.
- Coomer, James C. "Solving Energy Dilemma." Futurist 11.4 (1977): 228–230.
- Coomer, J.C. (1979). "The nature of the quest for a sustainable Society." In: Quest for a Sustainable Society, J.C. Coomer (ed.). New York: Pergamon Press.
- Coomer, James C. "The steady statement: The third biennial Woodlands conference,“The management of sustainable growth”, the Woodlands, Texas, 28–31 October 1979." Futures 12.3 (1980): 260–262.
