= Gerald O. Barney =

American physicist (1937–2020)

Gerald O. Barney (December 15, 1937 – September 9, 2020) was an American physicist, and expert in the field of sustainable development, known as principal author of The Global 2000 Report to the President.

== Biography ==
Barney was born in 1937, and started his studies at the Goethe University Frankfurt in the year 1958–59. He then returned the States to Salem, Oregon, where he obtained his BA at the Willamette University in 1961. Six years later he obtained his PhD in physics at the University of Wisconsin–Madison, with a thesis on fusion energy.

After graduation Barney conducted postdoctoral research on the management of complex systems at MIT in 1970. he then joined the Rockefeller Brothers Fund as staff member in the field of environmental studies. in the late 1980s he management the research and of the production of The Global 2000 Report to the President, issued by US President Jimmy Carter.

In 1983 he founded the Millennium Institute to "promote long-term integrated global thinking in national governments, universities, foundations, and the faith traditions of the world," In 2013 he issued a follow-up of his famous 1980 report, entitled The Global 2000 Report to the President of the US: Entering the 21st Century: The Technical Report.

Barney died on September 9, 2020, at the age of 81.

== Selected publications ==
- Barney, Gerald O. The global 2000 report to the President; entering the twenty-first century. (1980).
- Barney, Gerald O. The Global 2000 Report to the President of the US: Entering the 21st Century: The Technical Report. Vol. 2. Elsevier, 2013.

=== Articles ===
- Garrett, M. J., Barney, G. O., Hommel, J. M., & Barney, K. R. (1991). Studies for the 21st Century. In Studies for the 21st century. Institute for 21st Century Studies.
- Qu, Weishuang, and Gerald O. Barney. "Projecting China’s grain supply and demand using a new computer simulation model." China in the Global Economy Agriculture in China and OECD Countries Past Policies and Future Challenges (OECD Proceedings): Past Policies and Future Challenges (OECD Proceedings) (1999): 227.
- Barney, Gerald O. "The Global 2000 Report to the President and the Threshold 21 model: influences of Dana Meadows and system dynamics." System Dynamics Review 18.2 (2002): 123–136.
