= The Global 2000 Report to the President =

Report commissioned by President Jimmy Carter

The Global 2000 Report to the President was a 1980 report commissioned by President Jimmy Carter. It warned that world population growth, pollution and resource depletion would have dramatic consequences by the year 2000 if no changes in public policy were made. Physicist Gerald O. Barney was the study director.

The press referred to these volumes as "The Doomsday Report". It was a historical first in trying to analyze the effects of population growth, pollution, and other factors on the worldwide environment and possible political crises.

Volume Two reviewed the potential for global warming and climate change.

According to one reviewer:

"What emerges is a set of global problems of fairly alarming proportions. Serious stresses by the year 2000 are clearly visible in a world more crowded (6.35 billion as compared to 4 billion population in 1975), far more polluted, less stable ecologically, and more vulnerable to disruption. The progressive impoverishment of the world's natural-resource base raises concerns about the earth's capacity to continue to provide for human needs."

However, the report's impact was limited because Carter lost the 1980 United States presidential election. Ronald Reagan succeeded Carter as president in January 1981 and did not pursue the report's recommendations.

== See also ==
- 1980 in the environment
