= Russian Society for Ecological Economics =

Russian chapter of the International Society for Ecological Economics

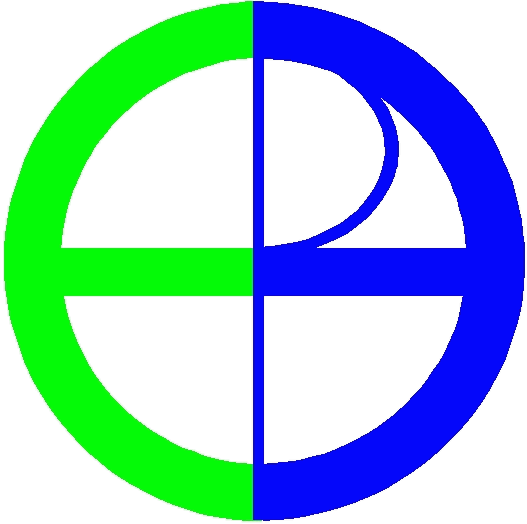
Российское общество экологической экономики (RSEE)

The Russian Society for Ecological Economics (RSEE) is a regional chapter of the International Society for Ecological Economics (ISEE). It was established as the ISEE Russian Chapter in 1992.

== History ==
Russian Society for Ecological Economics (RSEE) has started its activities in 1989 in Irkutsk based on the Irkutsk Computing Center, Russian Academy of Sciences, as an independent informal group of academic researchers, focusing mainly on ecological-economic modeling of regional development. Several research projects were implemented for the Lake Baikal region in late 80x and early 90x. Two National Conferences were held (1989, 1991) near Irkutsk, Russia, and several publications appeared on ecologically sustainable economic development of Baikal region.

In August 1992, at the Stockholm Meeting of the International Society for Ecological Economics, a discussion between Robert Costanza (ISEE President at that time), Paul Safonov, and Renat Perelet (both from Russian Academy of Sciences, Moscow) took place and the plans for joint activities were drawn. The By-Laws of the Russian regional chapter of ISEE were drafted, and they were adopted by the ISEE Board of Directors in the beginning of 1993. Finally, through a publication in the ISEE Newsletter (Ecological Economic Bulletin) in April 1993, the Russian Society for Ecological Economics had obtained the status as the ISEE Russian Chapter (ISEE/RC), and became a member of the international community of ecological economists, and the first Regional Society (Chapter) of the ISEE.

The founding ISEE/RC officers were:

- President: Prof. Vladimir I. Gurman, Program Systems Institute, Russian Academy of Sciences (Pereslavl-Zalessky)
- Vice-President: Dr. Renat A. Perelet, Institute for Systems Analysis, Russian Academy of Sciences (Moscow)
- Executive Director: Dr. Paul I. Safonov, Institute of Control Sciences, Russian Academy of Sciences (Moscow)
- Secretary-Treasurer: Dr. Tatyana V. Chemezova, Irkutsk State University (Irkutsk).

Also the Russian Regional Council for Ecological Economics was created, as a consultative body of the RSEE, aimed at independent assessment and advisory support for activities in the field of ecological economics in Russia and cooperation with other states of the NIS. The members of the first Council included Prof. Victor I. Danilov-Danilian, Minister of Environment and Natural Resources of Russia, Academician Prof. Nikita N. Moiseev, Russian Academy of Sciences, a Member of the President's Advisory Council, Prof. Ivery V. Prangishvily, Director of the Institute of Control Sciences, Russian Academy of Sciences, and many other prominent Russian scientists.

The Secretariat of the Russian Chapter was established at the Institute of Control Sciences (ICS), Russian Academy of Sciences (RAS), Moscow. Several local centers have been created in many regions of Russia (Pereslavl-Zalessky, Irkutsk, Rostov-on-Don, Tyumen, Krasnoyarsk, Chita, Novgorod, Saratov, St. Petersburg, and other), and also in Ukraine, Belarus, Kyrgyzstan, Turkmenistan.

== Conferences, events, projects ==
The First International Conference of ISEE/RC took place in Moscow and Pereslavl-Zalessky (1993). In his greeting to the Conference the Russian Minister of Environment and Natural Resources Prof. Victor Danilov-Danilian has emphasized the role the Russian Society for Ecological Economics and its cooperation with ISEE for the broadest understanding in the society of the major principles and strategies of the rational economic usage of Russian natural resources. The establishment of science/techno-parks and natural parks in different regions of Russia was encouraged by the minister who considered them important sources of new, environmentally sound and sustainable socio-economic systems based on ecological economic principles, monitoring of the natural environment and socio-economic processes. Academician Nikita Moiseev gave an opening plenary presentation about Noosphere, a theory of famous Russian Scientist Vladimir Vernadsky, which in may aspects had anticipated the ideas of Ecological Economics. Professor AnnMari Jansson (Stockholm University), former ISEE Vice-President, had discussed the emergence of the ecological economics paradigm at her invited plenary talk at this Conference and has welcomed participants to join activities of the ISEE.

This conference was followed in August 1993 by an expedition to Lake Baikal and its basin, aimed at attracting the attention of the international community to the urgency of solving ecological and economic problems of this region which is a unique natural system of world significance.

Since then, ISEE/RC (now RSEE) holds International Conferences every odd year:

- ISEE/RC 1993, Moscow and Pereslavl-Zalessky, followed by ecological expedition to Lake Baikal
- ISEE/RC 1995, Pereslavl-Zalessky
- ISEE/RC 1997, Novgorod
- ISEE/RC 1999, Saratov
- RSEE 2001, Moscow
- RSEE 2003, Lake Baikal
- RSEE 2005, St. Petersburg
- RSEE 2007, Sochi
- RSEE 2009, Curonian Spit on Baltic Sea
- RSEE 2011, Kemerovo.
- RSEE 2013 is planned to be held in Irkutsk, and Lake Baikal.

In 1994 ISEE/RC undertook a joint project with ISEE (supported by Charles Mott Foundation, Flint, Michigan) to translate four books in the field of ecological economics from English into Russian.

== Structure and administration ==
In November 1997, upon the decision of the ISEE/RC Business meeting at the Third biannual conference in Novgorod (July 1997), first elections of ISEE/RC officers were held and the new officers were elected.

In May 2001 the Administrative Board of the ISEE/RC adopted a decision about future development of the ISEE Russian Chapter more broadly as the Russian Society for Ecological Economics (RSEE). The new RSEE Constitution and By-Laws were developed to reflect the changes in the Russian and the International Societies for Ecological Economics. At Fifth ISEE/RC Conference in Moscow in September 2001 an organisational meeting was held concerning this transition, and in February 2002 the new Administrative Board was elected for the period of 2002-2003, and since then elections are being held bi-annually.

RSEE (ISEE/RC) Presidents:

- 1993-1997: Vladimir Gurman, Program Systems Institute, RAS, Pereslavl-Zalessky
- 1997-2001: Paul Safonov, Institute of Control Sciences, RAS, Moscow
- 2002-2003: Pavel Kasyanov, formerly at Russian Ministry of Environment, Moscow
- 2004-2005: Irina Glazyrina, Chita State University, Chita
- 2006-2007: Ivan Potravny, Plekhanov Russian Economics Academy, Moscow
- 2008-2009: Olga Medvedeva, Institute of New Economy Management, Moscow
- 2010-2011: Galina Mekush, Kemerovo State University, Kemerovo
- 2012-2013: Leonid Korytny, Institute of Geography, RAS, Irkutsk

RSEE welcomes ISEE members, and everyone concerned about the ecological-economic problems in Russia, to participate in its Conferences and joint research projects.

- RSEE Presentation (Power Point, 6.5MB)
