= Clem Tisdell =

Australian economist (1939–2022)

Clement Allan Tisdell (18 November 1939 – 14 July 2022 ) was an Australian economist and Emeritus Professor at the University of Queensland. He was best known for his work in environmental and ecological economics.

== Personal life ==
Tisdell was born in Taree, New South Wales on 18 November 1939.

He died on 14 July 2022 in Brisbane, Queensland.

== Academic background ==
Clem Tisdell obtained his bachelor's degree in Commerce (majoring in Economics) from the University of New South Wales in 1961 and his doctorate in Economics from the Australian National University in 1964. During his professorship he has occupied various academic offices: acting head of the Department of Economics at the Australian National University, dean of the Faculty of Economics and Commerce at the University of Newcastle, deputy director of the School of Marine Sciences and head of the Department of the School of Economics at the University of Queensland.

== Academic interests ==
While Clem Tisdell was commonly recognised as an ecological economist, his research interests were diverse. His contribution to the literature on the environment, biodiversity conservation and sustainable development notwithstanding, his research and writing encompassed various areas that included poverty, trade and globalisation, economic development, welfare economics, tourism, natural resources, the economics and socioeconomics of China and India, socioeconomic gender issues, economic theory (e.g., bounded rationality and economic evolution) and the history of economic thought.

Clem Tisdell was among the top three most prolific economists in Australia. Apart from academic articles, he authored microeconomics textbooks and monographs on the economics of environmental conservation. Under the RePEc project (Research Papers in Economics), Tisdell was ranked among the top 5% of all registered economic authors. In terms of the 'number of distinct works' produced, RePEc ranked him No. 11 globally.

== Selected publications ==
Books

- Tisdell, Clem; Chai, J.C.H. (1997). China's economic growth and transition: Macroeconomic, regional, environmental and other dimensions. New York City: Nova Science Publishers. ISBN 978-1-56072-524-4.
- Tisdell, Clem (2005). Economics of environmental conservation (2nd ed.). Cheltenham, UK; Northampton, Massachusetts USA: Edward Elgar. ISBN 978-1-84376-614-8.
- Tisdell, Clem (2010). Resource and environmental economics: Modern issues and applications. Singapore: World Scientific. ISBN 978-981-283-394-5.

Journal articles

- Tisdell, Clem (March 1988). "Sustainable development: differing perspectives of ecologists and economists, and relevance to LDCs". World Development. 16 (3): 373–384. doi:10.1016/0305-750X(88)90004-6.
- Tisdell, Clem (September 1997). "Capital/natural resource substitution: the debate of Georgescu-Roegen (through Daly) with Solow/Stiglitz". Ecological Economics. 22 (3): 289–291. Bibcode:1997EcoEc..22..289T. doi:10.1016/S0921-8009(97)00089-X.

See also: Nicholas Georgescu-Roegen, Herman Daly, Robert Solow and Joseph Stiglitz.

- Tisdell, Clem (November 2001). "Globalisation and sustainability: environmental Kuznets curve and the WTO". Ecological Economics. 39 (2): 185–196. Bibcode:2001EcoEc..39..185T. doi:10.1016/S0921-8009(01)00234-8.
- Tisdell, Clem (July 2003). "Socioeconomic causes of loss of animal genetic diversity: Analysis and assessment". Ecological Economics. 45 (3): 365–376. Bibcode:2003EcoEc..45..365T. doi:10.1016/S0921-8009(03)00091-0.
- Tisdell, Clem; Svizzero, Serge (2003). "Income inequality between skilled individuals" (PDF). International Journal of Social Economics. 30 (11): 1118–1130. doi:10.1108/03068290310497486. S2CID 153963662.
- Tisdell, Clem; Wilson, Clevo; Swarna Nantha, Hemanath (May 2005). "Globalisation and sustainability: environmental Kuznets curve and the WTO". Biological Conservation. 123 (2): 237–248. doi:10.1016/j.biocon.2004.11.012.
- Tisdell, Clem (15 October 2006). "Knowledge about a species' conservation status and funding for its preservation: Analysis" (PDF). Ecological Modelling. 198 (3–4): 515–519. Bibcode:2006EcMod.198..515T. doi:10.1016/j.ecolmodel.2006.04.021.
- Tisdell, Clem; Wilson, Clevo; Swarna Nantha, Hemanath (2007), "Comparison of funding and demand for the conservation of the charismatic koala with those for the critically endangered wombat Lasiorhinus krefftii", in Hawksworth, David L.; Bull, Alan T. (eds.), Vertebrate conservation and biodiversity, Dordrecht, Netherlands: Springer, pp. 435–455, ISBN 978-1-4020-6319-0.

Also available online as: Tisdell, Clem; Wilson, Clevo; Swarna Nantha, Hemanath (2007). "Comparison of funding and demand for the conservation of the charismatic koala with those for the critically endangered wombat Lasiorhinus krefftii". Vertebrate Conservation and Biodiversity (PDF). Topics in Biodiversity and Conservation. Vol. 5. Springer. pp. 435–455. doi:10.1007/978-1-4020-6320-6_29. ISBN 978-1-4020-6319-0.

Papers

- Tisdell, Clem (2005). Elephants and polity in ancient India as exemplified by Kautilya's Arthasastra (Science of Polity). Working papers in Economics, Ecology and the Environment, No. 120. School of Economics, University of Queensland: Brisbane, Queensland.
- Tisdell, Clem (2009). The production of biofuels: welfare and environmental consequences for Asia. Working papers in Economics, Ecology and the Environment, No. 159. School of Economics, University of Queensland: Brisbane, Queensland.
