= AnnMari Jansson =

Swedish academic focused on ecological economics

Eva AnnMari Jansson (née Olausson; 1934–2007) was a Swedish scientist who specialized in systems ecology. She is remembered for studying the interaction between ecology and economics, contributing to early research into ecological economics. Together with her husband Bengt-Owe Jansson, she undertook research at the Askö Laboratory into the fauna of the Baltic Sea, especially in the Cladophora Belt. Increasingly, under the influence of the American researcher Howard T. Odum, she turned her attention to ecology, examining the interaction between different species and the environment. In 1988, she helped to establish the International Society for Ecological Economics, editing its journal Ecological Economics from 1989 and hosting the society's meeting in Stockholm in 1992. In 1990, she was appointed director of Stockholm University's research centre for natural sources and the environment, becoming professor of systems ecology in 1999.

== Early life, education and family ==
Born in Stockholm on 27 August 1934, Eva AnnMari Olausson was the daughter of Sven Olausson and his wife Eva née Pettersson. After obtaining her school-leaving certificate in 1953, she began to study biology at Stockholm College, increasingly focusing on zoology with a bachelor thesis on pigeons. In 1958, she married her university associate Bengt-Owe Jansson with whom she had three children: Eva (1964), Olof (1966) and Per (1967). In 1974, she was granted a Ph.D. in connection with her thesis on Community structure, modelling and simulation of the Cladophora ecosystem in the Baltic Sea.

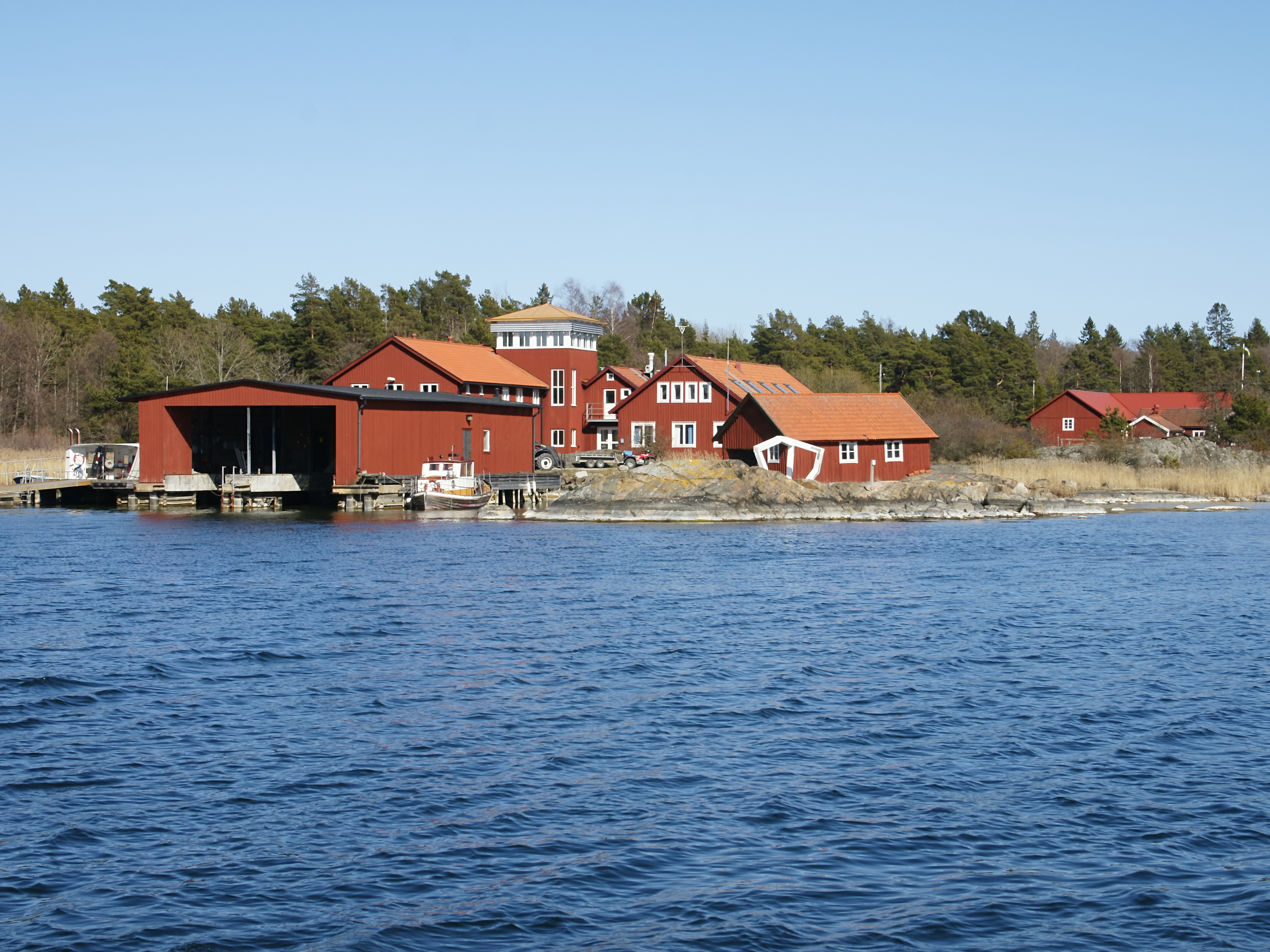
The Askö Laboratory

== Career ==
Influenced by her husband who moved into marine studies, she decided to adopt his interests. In 1961, the couple established Stockholm University's Askö Laboratory in the Stockholm Archipelago where they sought to gain a better understanding of the ecosystem of the Baltic Sea. AnnMari Jansson concentrated on the ecology of the Cladophora Belt, named after the green algae Cladophora found on the area's rocky shores. She went on to analyse the different species and their interaction with their environment. This work was based on the models presented by the American ecologist Howard T. Odum who visited the laboratory in 1970.

In the late 1970s and early 1980s, she fostered collaboration on the environment between ecologists and economists. In 1982, together with the economist Karl-Göran Mäler she invited ecologists and economists to a symposium in Saltsjöbaden on "Integrating Ecology and Economy" which eventually led to research into ecological economy. In 1988, she helped to establish the International Society for Ecological Economics. She become one of the editors of the organization's journal Ecological Economics. In 1992, she hosted the society's meeting in Stockholm and in 1996 was honored with the society's Kenneth E. Boulding Memorial Award.

Jansson was appointed by Stockholm University in 1990 director of its newly established research centre on natural resrouces and the environment. In 1995, she was promoted to assistant professor and in 1999 to professor of ecosystems.

AnnMari Jansson died on 13 January 2007.
