= Regenerative economics =

Regenerative economics is an economic system that works to regenerate capital assets. In standard economic theory, one can either “regenerate” one's capital assets or consume them until the asset cannot produce a viable stream of goods and/or services. Regenerative economics accounts for and gives economic value to Earth and the Sun. Most of regenerative economics focuses on the earth and the goods and services it supplies.

Regenerative economics is based on the notion of Earth as the original capital asset, and so places value on the environment. Proponents of regenerative economics believe that disregarding this value has created the unsustainable economic condition referred to as uneconomic growth, a phrase coined by leading ecological economist and steady-state theorist Herman Daly. The authors of the regenerative economic theory believe uneconomic growth is the opposite of regenerative economics.

== Concepts and principles ==
Regenerative economics combines concepts of economics and the values of a self-sustaining and self-renewing system. By doing so, it enhances the resiliency of the economic system. Regenerative economics works to account for social costs and values that may be traditionally unaccounted for, including:

- Cross-scale circulation of resources and information
- Adequate investment in capital
- Emphasis on using renewable resources in a circular economy
- Diversification of business sizes
- Systemic benefits
- Learning processes

There are four components of regenerative economics: circulation, organizational structure, relationships and values, and collective learning. Circulation refers to the flow of resources, such as money, information, and energy sources. Organization structure determines the flow of circulation, either by enhancing or inhibiting flow. Relationships and values determine the operations and efficiency of circulation. Collective learning supports strength of the system. All four components are interdependent and encompassing, and they contribute toward a regenerative economy.

=== Principles ===
The following are the ten principles of regenerative economics.

- Maintain robust, cross-scale circulation of critical flow
- Regenerative re-investment
- Maintain reliable inputs
- Maintain healthy outputs
- Maintain a healthy balance of integration of organizations of all sizes
- Maintain a healthy balance of resilience and efficiency
- Maintain sufficient diversity
- Promote mutually-beneficial relationships and common-cause values
- Promote constructive activity and limit overly-extractive and speculative processes
- Promote effective, adaptive, collective learning

Regenerative economics works to strengthen the world's systems by systemic issues, driving innovation, and learning.

=== Regenerative finance ===
Regenerative finance (ReFi) is an approach to investing that builds on sustainable finance to promote ecological health, social well-being, and economic resilience in accordance with principles of regenerative economics. This approach often includes, but is not limited to, the use of decentralized finance.

== Sustainability goals ==
Regenerative economists believe the most important ways to achieve sustainability are to restructure the economy and to create a widespread culture that promotes sustainable activity and cooperation. Unlike more conventional approaches to conservation and sustainability, it focuses less on mitigating the effects of human activity and more on changing human behavior to minimize impact. Specifically, it states there needs to be a focus not only in addressing systematic problems but also to strengthen human and ecological wellbeing. Transforming the economic system to become more sustainable requires more than just reallocating the money supply or strengthening the roles of financial regulators; it involves challenging the socio-ecological system: concentration of resources, transparency of financial systems, governance structures, and the health of the planet.

== Alternative frameworks ==
There are other frameworks to address the challenges of the current economic system.

Ecological economics is also an interdisciplinary field used to address environmental and economic problems. It focuses on setting systematic limits to the current economic system, unlike regenerative economics' focus on reproduction of life in nature.

The circular economy model emphasizes maximizing the use of resources for as long as possible.

== See also ==
- Circular economy
