= Stanislav Edward Shmelev =

Ecological economist

Stanislav Edward Shmelev'
- Education: MSc in Operations Research, St. Petersburg University (2000), PhD in Ecological Economics and Mathematical Methods, St. Petersburg University (2003), MA in Photography, Falmouth University (2019), Global Executive MBA, London School of Economics and Political Science, HEC Paris and New York University Stern School of Business (2021)
- Occupation: Ecological economist
- Organization(s): Founder and executive director of Environment Europe Foundation

Stanislav Edward Shmelev is an ecological economist affiliated with the International Society for Ecological Economics (ISEE). He currently holds several directorial positions at non-governmental organizations and consults with the UN Development Programme. He has been a visiting professor at the Universities of Torino, University of Geneva, Paris Dauphine, Sciences Po Caen, National University of Colombia, Kazakh National University and lectured at the University of St. Gallen, University of Edinburgh, University of Buckingham, and is the author of multiple books and articles on sustainability and ecological economics.

== Background ==
Shmelev has worked as a Senior Researcher at the Environmental Change Institute, University of Oxford (2008–2009), and as a Senior Visiting Research Associate at the School of Geography and the Environment, University of Oxford. The main focus of his work is on the theory of ecological economics, macroeconomic assessments of sustainability, sustainable cities, business models and investing, corporate sustainability, and other environmental issues. He has been a visiting professor in ecological economics and lectured at various universities.

As the founder and CEO of Environment Europe Limited, and founder and CEO of Environment Europe Foundation Stichting, he has started an executive education programme in Ecological Economics in Oxford. Run under the supervision of Environment Europe, it has been attended by participants from numerous countries.

== Works ==
=== Green economy ===
Stanislav Edward Shmelev edited the widely used 'Green Economy Reader'. This was responsible for bringing together works by leading ecological economists and sustainability experts. The contributors include Professors David Orr, Peter Söderbaum, Robert Ayres, Herman Daly, Stanislav Shmelev, Anthony Friend, Stefan Speck, Herbert Girardet, Stefan Giljum, Terry Barker, Jeroen van den Bergh, David Elliott, Joan Martinez-Alier, Irina Shmeleva, Robert Costanza, Gar Alperovitz, Joshua Farley, Carol Franco, Tim Jackson, Ida Kubiszewski, Juliet Schor and Peter Victor.

- Shmelev S. E. Speck S. U. (2018) Green Fiscal Reform in Sweden: Econometric Assessment of the Carbon and Energy Taxation Scheme, Renewable and Sustainable Energy Reviews, Volume 90, July 2018, pp. 969–981

=== Ecological economics: Sustainability in Practice ===
Stanislav Edward Shmelev authored the widely used textbook 'Ecological economics: sustainability in practice (ISBN 978-94-007-1971-2). The book officially launched in 2012.

=== Macro sustainability Assessment ===
Stanislav Edward Shmelev developed a novel method of sustainability assessment that uses the potential of multi-criteria decision aid tools (MCDA) and applies them to the dynamic sets of sustainability criteria. This research developed from a series of lectures he gave at European universities on sustainability in Russia, where social and environmental aspects of economic development have been neglected. This methodology is particularly important for defining sustainability, assessing the progress towards sustainability of a given society or system. Several applied cases have been published now:

- Shmelev S. (2017), ed. 'Green Economy Reader: Lectures in Ecological Economics and Sustainability', Springer, 463 pp. https://www.springer.com/gp/book/9783319389172
- Shmelev S. (2012) "Ecological Economics: Sustainability in Practice', Springer, 248 pp. https://www.springer.com/gp/book/9789400719712
- Shmelev, Stanislav E. (2011). "Dynamic sustainability assessment: The case of Russia in the period of transition (1985–2008)" (PDF). Ecological Economics. 70 (11): 2039–2049. Bibcode:2011EcoEc..70.2039S. doi:10.1016/j.ecolecon.2011.06.003. S2CID 154759626.
- Shmelev S. (2010) Multi-dimensional Analysis of Macro Sustainability of Russia, Politex, Vol. 4, pp. 115–133
- Shmelev S. and Rodrigues-Labajos B. (2009) Dynamic multidimensional assessment of stability at the macro level: The case of Austria, Ecological Economics, Vol. 68, Issue 10, pp. 2560–2573

=== Multidimensional assessment of biodiversity ===
In 2008-2009, Stanislav Shmelev produced a major report for IUCN where he presented a rationale for the Multidimensional Assessment of Ecosystems and Biodiversity. The report has been published in Shmelev (2012).

In 2009, the United Nations Environment Programme invited Shmelev to be a reviewer for The Economics of Ecosystems and Biodiversity (TEEB) Report

In 2018, Stanislav Shmelev published a photography album entitled 'Ecosystems', which hoped to show the futility of measuring ecological worth with monetary value.

In 2021, Stanislav Shmelev was selected as one of the world's 120 top contemporary artists and exhibited at the Arte Laguna Prize exhibition in Venice.

=== Sustainable energy ===
The innovative paper published in Renewable and Sustainable Energy Reviews adopts a multi-criteria perspective and extends the UK decarbonisation scenarios by dimensions that are often overlooked, namely, employment, land use, water use and diversity of the energy mix *Shmelev, Stanislav E.; Van Den Bergh, Jeroen C.J.M. (2016). "Optimal diversity of renewable energy alternatives under multiple criteria: An application to the UK". Renewable and Sustainable Energy Reviews. 60: 679–691. Bibcode:2016RSERv..60..679S. doi:10.1016/j.rser.2016.01.100.

In 2009, Shmelev was interviewed for the European Union Euronews Channel on the issues of renewable energy and sustainable development

=== Sustainable waste management ===
- Shmelev, S.E.; Powell, J.R. (2006). "Ecological–economic modelling for strategic regional waste management systems". Ecological Economics. 59 (1): 115–130. Bibcode:2006EcoEc..59..115S. doi:10.1016/j.ecolecon.2005.09.030.

=== Sustainable cities ===
The issue of sustainable cities has been dealt with by Shmelev in the context of the interdisciplinary linkages in the development of large cities. He co-organized two international workshops on sustainable cities at the University of Oxford and Saint Petersburg State University.

The first workshop resulted in a book:

- Shmeleva I. A. and Shmelev S. E. (Eds) (2007) Sustainable Urban Development: Interdisciplinary Approach, St Petersburg State University, 265 pp.

The second workshop produced a special issue of the International Journal of Sustainable Development entirely devoted to sustainable cities:

The issues of multidimensional benchmarking for megacities have been analysed in detail in the recent book, Green Economy Reader: Lectures in Ecological Economics and Sustainability ISBN 978-3-319-38919-6

New peer-reviewed publications exploring the subject of smart and sustainable cities include:

- Shmelev. S.E., Shmeleva I.A. (2019) Multidimensional sustainability benchmarking for smart megacities, Cities, 2019, Vol. 92, pp. 134–163
- Shmelev S. E., Shmeleva I.A. (2018) Global urban sustainability assessment: A multidimensional approach, Sustainable Development, 2018; Volume 26, Issue 6, pp. 904–920;

and a new volume:

- Shmelev S.E. (ed) (2019) Sustainable Cities Reimagined: Multidimensional Assessment and Smart Solutions, Routledge, 312pp. https://www.routledge.com/Sustainable-Cities-Reimagined-Multidimensional-Indicators-and-Smart-Solutions/Shmelev/p/book/9780367254209

=== Environmentally-Extended Input-Output Analysis ===
A detailed environmentally-extended input-output analysis of the UK economy is presented in Sustainability Analysis: An Interdisciplinary Approach ISBN 978-0-230-36243-7

== Publications ==
- Shmelev S., ed. (2019) Sustainable Cities Reimagined: Multidimensional Assessment and Smart Solutions. Routledge, 336 pp. ISBN 978-0-367-25420-9
- Shmelev S. (2018) Ecosystems: Complexity, Diversity and Nature's Contribution to Humanity. Environment Europe Press
- Shmelev S., ed. (2017) Green Economy Reader. Lectures in Ecological Economics and Sustainability. Springer, 463 pp. ISBN 978-3-319-38919-6
- Shmelev S. (2012) Ecological Economics: Sustainability in Practice. Springer, 248 pp. ISBN 978-94-007-1972-9
- Shmelev S., Shmeleva I.A., eds. (2012) Sustainability Analysis: An Interdisciplinary Approach. Palgrave, 335 pp. ISBN 978-0-230-36243-7
- Shmelev. S.E., Shmeleva I.A. (2019) Multidimensional sustainability benchmarking for smart megacities, Cities, 2019, Vol. 92, pp. 134–163
- Shmelev S. E., Shmeleva I.A. (2018) Global urban sustainability assessment: A multidimensional approach, Sustainable Development, 2018; Volume 26, Issue 6, pp. 904–920
- Shmelev S. E. Speck S. U. (2018) Green Fiscal Reform in Sweden: Econometric Assessment of the Carbon and Energy Taxation Scheme, Renewable and Sustainable Energy Reviews, Volume 90, July 2018, pp. 969–981
- Shmelev S. E., Sagiyeva R. K., Kadyrkhanova Z. M., Chzhan Y. Y., Shmeleva I. A. (2018), Comparative Sustainability Analysis of Two Asian Cities: A Multidimensional Assessment of Taipei and Almaty, Journal of Asian Finance, Economics and Business, 5(3): 143–155;
- Weiss, J., Pengue W., May, P., Shmelev S., Dajan Z. (2017) UN Environmental Policy: Non-State Actors, Trends, and the Regulatory Role of the State, Journal of Political Ecology 09/2017, 24: 1013–1037.
- Shmelev S. E., van den Bergh J.C.J.M. (2016) Optimal Diversity of Renewable Energy Alternatives under Multiple Criteria: An Application to the UK, Renewable & Sustainable Energy Reviews, Volume 60, July 2016, pp. 679–691
- Shmelev S.E. (2011) Dynamic Sustainability Assessment: The Case of Russia in the Period of Transition (1985-2007), Ecological Economics, Vol. 70, Issue 11, pp. 2039–2049
- Shmelev S.E., Rodrigues-Labajos B., (2009) Dynamic multidimensional assessment of sustainability at the macro level: The case of Austria, Ecological Economics, Vol. 68, Issue 10, pp. 2560–2573;
- Shmelev S.E., Shmeleva I.A. (2009) Sustainable Cities: Problems of Integrated Interdisciplinary Research, International Journal of Sustainable Development, Vol. 12, n. 1, pp. 4–24;
- Shmelev S.E., Powell J.R. (2006) Ecological economic modelling for strategic regional waste management systems, Ecological Economics, Vol. 59, Issue 1, pp. 115–130
