= Harrington paradox =

Harrington paradox is a notion in the environmental and ecological economics describing the compliance of firms to the environmental regulations. The paradox was first described in Winston Harrington's paper in 1988 and was based on the research over monitoring, realization and compliance to environmental regulations in the US from the end of the 1970s to the beginning of the 1980s. According to the paradox, the firms in general comply with environmental regulations in spite of the fact that:

- Frequency of environmental monitoring of firms is low
- In case of detection of violations, the violator-firm is rarely punished
- The expected fine is low in comparison to the cost of compliance

== Explanation ==
Firms' compliance at such level is contrary to the rational crime theory of Gary Becker which describes the behavior of profit maximizing entities. The rational firms will comply to the standards only in case the expected fine is higher than the cost of compliance. In order to explain the paradox several suggestions have been put forward.

- While Gary Becker's model assumes random monitoring of firms, actual monitoring strategies follow a targeted approach and more frequently inspect firms that are more likely to be in violation. Targeted monitoring and enforcement was put forward as an explanation of the Harrington paradox by Winston Harrington in his 1988 article.
- An alternative explanation of the paradox is allowing firms to report environmental violations voluntarily in order to be treated with leniency by the regulator.
- Firms may exhibit altruism or self-image concern and voluntarily comply with environmental regulation

== Observation ==
The empirical data observing the paradox is rare. In the research conducted by Norwegian Climate and Pollution Agency in 2001 no serious violations were revealed, but in the majority of firms (80%) there were minor deviations from standards. The fact that in Norway there is low frequency of monitoring and the fine system for minor violations is light can not bring strong evidence to the paradox, as major violations imply very strict punishments which is conforming to the rational crime theory.

== Additional materials ==
- Enforcement leverage when penalties are restricted, Harrington, W. 1988, Journal of Public Economics 37, 29–53
- Regulatory dealing – revisiting the Harrington paradox, Anthony Heyes, Neil Rickman, Journal of Public Economics 72 (1999) 361–378
- Firms’ Compliance to Environmental Regulation: Is There Really a Paradox? Karine Nyborg and Kjetil Telle, Environmental & Resource Economics (2006) 35:1–18
- Corporate environmentalism and environmental statutory permitting, Christopher S. Decker, Journal of Law and Economics, vol. XLVI (April 2003)
- A dissolving paradox: Firms’ compliance to environmental regulation, Karine Nyborg and Kjetil Telle, Memorandum No 02/2, Department of Economics University of Oslo
- Enforcement leverage when penalties are restricted: a reconsideration under asymmetric information, Mark Raymond, Journal of Public Economics, Volume 73, Issue 2, 1 August 1999, Pages 289-295
- Monitoring and Enforcement of Environmental Policy, Mark A. Cohen 1998, International Yearbook of Environmental and Resource Economics, Volume III, edited by Tom Tietenberg and Henk Folmer; Edward Elgar publishers (1999)
