= Irina Shmelyova =

Irina Alexandrovna Shmeleva (Russian: Ири́на Алекса́ндровна Шмелева) is an environmental psychologist, formerly a professor of the School of International Relations of St. Petersburg State University. Dr Shmeleva has authored several books on the psychology of ecological consciousness, sustainable development, sustainable urban development, cross-cultural psychology and numerous papers on international environmental policy, international relations, and environmental discourse.

== Career ==
Dr Shmeleva is a Director of the Institute of Sustainable Development based in St Petersburg. She has held Visiting Professorships at:

- Charles University of Prague (Czech Republic) http://www.cuni.cz/UKENG-1.html
- Stockholm University (Sweden) http://www.su.se/english/
- University of Fribourg (Switzerland) http://www.unifr.ch/home/welcomeE.php
- University of Osnabrück (Germany) http://www.uni-osnabrueck.de/standard_en/
- Free University of Berlin (Germany) https://www.fu-berlin.de/en/index.html

In 2005, Ass. Prof., Dr. Shmeleva co-organized an International Conference "Globalization, New Economy and the Environment. Business and Society Challenges for Sustainable Development", held at St Petersburg State University (http://www.spbu.ru/)

In 2005–2006, Dr. Shmeleva collaborated with Dr. Stanislav Edward Shmelev https://web.archive.org/web/20121030010601/http://www.geog.ox.ac.uk/staff/sshmelev.html on the series of interdisciplinary international workshops focused on the subject of sustainable cities.

== Published works ==
- Shmelev S. E. and Shmeleva I.A. (eds) (2012) "Sustainability Analysis: an Interdsciplinary Approach", Palgrave, UK (http://www.palgrave.com/products/title.aspx?pid=539023)
- Shmeleva I.A.(2010) "Introduction to Psychology", 2nd Edition (http://www.ozon.ru/context/detail/id/5081219/)
- Shmeleva I.A. (2006) "Psychology of Ecological Consciousness", St Petersburg University Press (http://www.ozon.ru/context/detail/id/3843498/)
- Shmeleva I.A. and Pochebut L. (eds) (2005) "Cross-Cultural Psychology. Urgent Problems", St Petersburg University Press (http://www.ozon.ru/context/detail/id/2907844/)
- Shmeleva I.A. and Shmelev S.E. (eds) (2007) "Sustainable Urban Development. Interdisciplinary Approach". St Petersburg University Press.

Additional papers in peer-reviewed journals could be viewed following the link: https://independent.academia.edu/IrinaShmeleva
