= Smee (disambiguation) =

Smee is a character in J. M. Barrie's Peter Pan novels.

Smee or SMEE may also refer to:

- Alfred Smee (1818–1877), English surgeon, chemist, metallurgist and inventor
  - Smee cell
- Anthony Smee (born 1949), English theatre producer and actor
- Phil Smee (Philip Lloyd-Smee), English music journalist and album cover designer
- Raymond Smee (1930–2019), Australian water polo player
- Roger Smee (born 1948), English footballer
- Sebastian Smee, Australian arts critic
- Shanghai Micro Electronics Equipment (SMEE), a manufacturer of semiconductor manufacturing equipment based in Shanghai, China
- Mesoamerican Society for Ecological Economics (SMEE), a regional chapter of the International Society for Ecological Economics
- Straight Air Motor Car Electric-Pneumatic Emergency (SMEE), a braking system used on the Standard Lo-V (New York City Subway car) and other rolling stock

== See also ==
- Shmee (disambiguation)
- Smew, a species of duck
