= Shmelyov =

Shmelyov or Shmelev (Russian: Шмелёв) is a surname. It is derived from the sobriquet "шмель" ("Bumblebee"). Notable people with the surname include:

- Daria Shmeleva (born 1994), Russian track cyclist
- Darya Shmeleva (born 1976), Russian swimmer
- Ivan Shmelyov (1873–1950), Russian émigré writer
- Stanislav Edward Shmelev, ecological economist affiliated with the International Society for Ecological Economics
- Vladimir Shmelyov (1946–2023), Soviet modern pentathlete and Olympic Champion
