= Richard B. Norgaard =

American economist (born 1943)

- Born: August 18, 1943 (age 83); Washington D. C., U.S.

Academic background
- Education: University of California, Berkeley; Oregon State University; University of Chicago

Academic work
- Discipline: Ecological economics

Richard B. Norgaard (born August 18, 1943) is an American professor emeritus of ecological economics in the Energy and Resources Group at the University of California, Berkeley, the first chair and a continuing member of the independent science board of CALFED (California Bay-Delta Authority), and a founding member and former president of the International Society for Ecological Economics. He received the Kenneth E. Boulding Memorial Award in 2006 for recognition of advancements in research combining social theory and the natural sciences. He is considered one of the founders of and a continuing leader in the field of ecological economics.

== Personal life ==
Norgaard was born on August 18, 1943, in Washington D. C., and raised in Montclair, an East Bay neighborhood in the San Francisco Bay Area of California.

At an early age, he was interested in white water rafting, and was introduced to the sport by a friend, whose father, Lou Elliott, worked for the Sierra Club coordinating river trips. When he was 15 Norgaard started working for H.A.T.C.H River Expeditions as a pot washer, and was based in Vernal, Utah, near the confluence of the Green River (Colorado River) and Yampa Rivers. Norgaard continued in the business of white water rafting, quickly becoming a head boatman, and bounced around many guiding companies including one that Lou Elliott eventually founded after his career at The Sierra Club. His commitment to and involvement in the environmental movement began when he served as a river guide to David Brower, then executive director of the Sierra Club, for the Glen Canyon stretch of the Colorado River in the early 1960s. Norgaard also worked shortly as a professional photographer prior to his career in academics.

Since 2004, following the election of George W. Bush to a second term, Norgaard has been seen wearing only black colored attire, a silent yet visible protest against the folly of American electorate and the rise of anti-government, market fundamentalism, and "know-nothingism". He has four children and is married to Nancy A. Rader, the Executive Director of the California Wind Energy Association (CALWEA). Norgaard continues river rafting every summer with his family.

== Academic career ==
Norgaard received his B.A. in economics from University of California, Berkeley, a M.S. in agricultural economics from Oregon State University, and a Ph.D. in economics from the University of Chicago in 1971. That same year, at the age of 27, he was an advisor for President Richard Nixon as part of the President’s Council on Environmental Quality. During the 1970s Dr. Norgaard was one of the nation's leading experts on the leasing of petroleum rights, especially on the outer continental shelf, as well as a leading expert on the economics of pesticide use and biological control of pests. He published an influential paper in 1975 that showed that farmers who hired an independent pest-control expert had higher profits and used half as much pesticide as those who relied on the advice of agribusiness representatives.

Dr. Norgaard became a Professor at U.C. Berkeley at the age of 27 in the Department of Agricultural and Resource Economics. Thereafter he helped found the field of Ecological Economics, and also helped initiate the interdisciplinary Energy and Resources Group at U.C. Berkeley as a graduate program in the early 1970s; he was later fully integrated as a member of its core faculty in the 1980s. He was a professor at the University of California, Berkeley for over 40 years before his retirement in 2013, most recently having taught courses in ecological economics; history of economics; and the history, science, and politics of California's water. His field experience was primarily in Alaska, Brazil, California, and Vietnam with minor forays in other parts of the globe.

Dr. Norgaard is the author of one book, co-author or editor of three additional books, and has over 100 other publications spanning the fields of environment and development, tropical forestry and agriculture, environmental epistemology, energy economics, and ecological economics. Although his research scholarship has been an eclectic mix of sociology, economics, philosophy, and the natural sciences, and he is well known for his iconoclast perspectives of conventional economics, stemming from a strong commitment to inter-disciplinarity and social justice, Professor Norgaard is also among the 1000 economists in the world most cited by other economists (Millennium Editions of Who's Who in Economics, 2000) and was one of ten American economists interviewed in The Changing Face of Economics: Conversations with Cutting Edge Economists (Colander, Holt, and Rosser, University of Michigan Press, 2004).

He is frequently recognized within the field of economics (Who’s Who in Economics, Millennium Edition, and The Changing Face of Economics: Conversations with Cutting Edge Economists 2004) and the field of ecological economics (Kenneth E. Boulding Award, 2006) for both his critiques of and contributions to economics even while he has dedicated most of his time working across disciplinary ways of understanding. The American Association for the Advancement of Science elected Norgaard to the status of “Fellow” in 2007. His research emphasizes how the resolution of complex socio-environmental problems challenges modern beliefs about science and policy and explores development as a process of coevolution between social and environmental systems. His writing is informed through work on energy, environment, and development issues around the globe with different periods of his efforts emphasizing Alaska, Brazil, and California.

Norgaard is a lead author of the 5th Assessment of the Intergovernmental Panel on Climate Change, and serves on the International Panel on Sustainable Resource Management of the United Nations Environment Programme. In 2006, Norgaard was awarded the Kenneth Boulding Memorial Award for "expanding transdisciplinary approaches to knowledge, promoting pluralism, and forging a coevolutionary approach to economy, society, and the environment in the spirit of the open and inquisitive mind that was the hallmark of Boulding's work." He was selected as a fellow of the American Association for the Advancement of Science in 2007. Norgaard also is continuing to lead the Bay Delta Conservation Plan of the Independent Science Board of CALFED (California Bay-Delta Authority).

Norgaard serves on the board of directors of the New Economics Institute, on scientific advisory boards to Tsinghua and Beijing Normal University, and on the board of EcoEquity. He has also served on the board of directors of the American Institute of Biological Sciences (2000–2009), in the position of treasurer (2003–2009. He served as president of the International Society for Ecological Economics (1998–2001). He served as the founding chair of the board of Redefining Progress (1994–97) and as a member of its board until 2007. Norgaard was a project specialist with the Ford Foundation in Brazil (1978 and 1979), a visiting research fellow at the World Bank (1992). Norgaard also has previously served on the science advisory board of the U.S. EPA (2000–2004), as a member of the U.S. committee of the Scientific Committee on Problems of the Environment (SCOPE), and on numerous panels of the National Research Council and the former Office of Technology Assessment.

== Selected publications ==
=== Books ===
- Norgaard, Richard B. 1994. Development Betrayed: The End of Progress and a Coevolutionary Revisioning of the Future. London and New York. Routledge. ISBN 978-0415068628
- Costanza, Robert, John Cumberland, Herman Daly, Robert Goodland, and Richard B. Norgaard. 1997. An Introduction to Ecological Economics (intermediate level college text). International Society for Ecological Economics and St. Lucie Press, Florida. ISBN 978-1884015724
- Dryzek, John S., David Schlosberg, and Richard B. Norgaard. (eds). 2011. The Oxford Handbook of Climate Change and Society. Oxford University Press. Oxford. ISBN 978-0199566600
- Dryzek, John S., Richard B. Norgaard, and David Schlosberg. 2013. Climate-Challenged Society. Oxford University Press. ISBN 978-0199660117

=== Selected journal articles ===
- Hall, Darwin C., and Richard B. Norgaard. "On the timing and application of pesticides." American Journal of Agricultural Economics 55.2 (1973): 198–201.
- Norgaard, Richard B. "Coevolutionary development potential." Land economics 60.2 (1984): 160–173.
- Norgaard, Richard B. "Environmental economics: an evolutionary critique and a plea for pluralism." Journal of Environmental Economics and Management 12.4 (1985): 382–394.
- Howarth, Richard B., and Richard B. Norgaard. "Intergenerational resource rights, efficiency, and social optimality." Land economics 66.1 (1990): 1–11.
- Mcneely, Jeffrey A., and Richard B. Norgaard. "Developed country policies and biological diversity in developing countries." Agriculture, ecosystems & environment 42.1 (1992): 194–204.
- Howarth, Richard B., and Richard B. Norgaard. "Environmental valuation under sustainable development." The American economic review 82.2 (1992): 473–477.
- Norgaard, R. B. "Ecology, politics, and economics: finding the common ground for decision making in conservation." Principles of conservation biology. Sinauer Associates, Sunderland, Massachusetts, USA (1994): 439–465.
- Norgaard, Richard B., and Thomas O. Sikor. "The methodology and practice of agroecology." Agroecology, the Science of Sustainable Agriculture (1995): 53–62.
- Lélé, Sharachchandra, and Richard B. Norgaard. "Sustainability and the scientist’s burden." Conservation Biology 10.2 (1996): 354–365.
- Lélé, Sharachchandra, and Richard B. Norgaard. "Practicing interdisciplinarity." BioScience 55.11 (2005): 967–975.
- Norgaard, Richard B., and Paul Baer. "Collectively seeing complex systems: The nature of the problem." BioScience 55.11 (2005): 953–960.
- Norgaard, Richard B., and Paul Baer. "Collectively seeing climate change: The limits of formal models." BioScience 55.11 (2005): 961–966.
- Norgaard, Richard B. "Bubbles in a back eddy: a commentary on “the origin, diagnostic attributes and practical application of coevolutionary theory”." Ecological Economics 54.4 (2005): 362–365.
- Sneddon, Christopher, Richard B. Howarth, and Richard B. Norgaard. 2006. Sustainable Development in a Post-Brundtland World. Ecological Economics 57(2):253–68.
- Norgaard, Richard B. and Xuemei Liu. 2007. Market Governance Failure. Ecological Economics. 60(3):634–641.
- Norgaard, Richard B. "Deliberative economics." Ecological Economics 63.2-3 (2007): 375–82.
- Norgaard, Richard B. "Finding hope in the millennium ecosystem assessment." Conservation Biology 22.4 (2008): 862–869.
- Norgaard, Richard B., and Ling Jin. "Trade and the governance of ecosystem services." Ecological Economics 66.4 (2008): 638–652.
- Norgaard, Richard B., Giorgos Kallis, and Michael Kiparsky. "Collectively engaging complex socio-ecological systems: re-envisioning science, governance, and the California Delta." environmental science & policy 12.6 (2009): 644–652.
- Norgaard, Richard B. "Ecosystem services: From eye-opening metaphor to complexity blinder." Ecological Economics 69.6 (2010): 1219–1227.
- Kallis, Giorgos, and Richard B. Norgaard. "Coevolutionary ecological economics." Ecological Economics 69.4 (2010): 690–699.
- Gual, Miguel A., and Richard B. Norgaard. "Bridging ecological and social systems coevolution: A review and proposal." Ecological economics 69.4 (2010): 707–717.

=== Articles about ===
- 1992. The Price of Green. Economics Focus. The Economist (May 9): 87.
- 1992. Warsh, David. Economics, Ecology: Twin sciences of the 21st century. Economic Principles. The Boston Sunday Globe (May 24): 29–30.
- 1992. Interview titled: Wirtschaften für unsere Enkelkinder? WEINER BLÆTTER 05/92 pages 19–21.
- 1992. Interview titled: Richard B. Norgaard. Options International Institute for Applied Systems Analysis. (September):14-15.
- 2004. “Richard B. Norgaard”. Chapter 8 in The Changing Face of Economics: Conversations with Cutting Edge Economists. Dave Colander, Ric Holt, and J. Barkley Rosser. Ann Arbor. University of Michigan Press.
- 2005. “Return to a lost world of upside-down mountains”. Barry Bergman. Berkeleyan 34(6):8 (September 22).
- 1992. Taking Future Generations into Account. Lynn Atwood. Berkeleyan20(12):
- 2010. “Co-Evolutionary Economics (main originator: Richard Norgaard)”. Chapter 9 in Integral Economics: Releasing the Economic Genius of Society.London. Gower Ashgate.
- 2011. “Richard Norgaard”. Chapter 6 in The Wildness Within: Remembering David Brower. Kenneth Brower. Berkeley. Heyday Books.
