= Shmee =

Shmee may refer to:

- Shmee150 (Tim Burton, born 1987), also known as Shmee, a British car vlogger
- Shmee, a fictional companion of comic book character Squee

== See also ==
- Smee (disambiguation)
- Shmi Skywalker-Lars, a member of the fictional Skywalker family in Star Wars
