= Uneconomic growth =

Economic growth that reflects or creates a decline in the quality of life

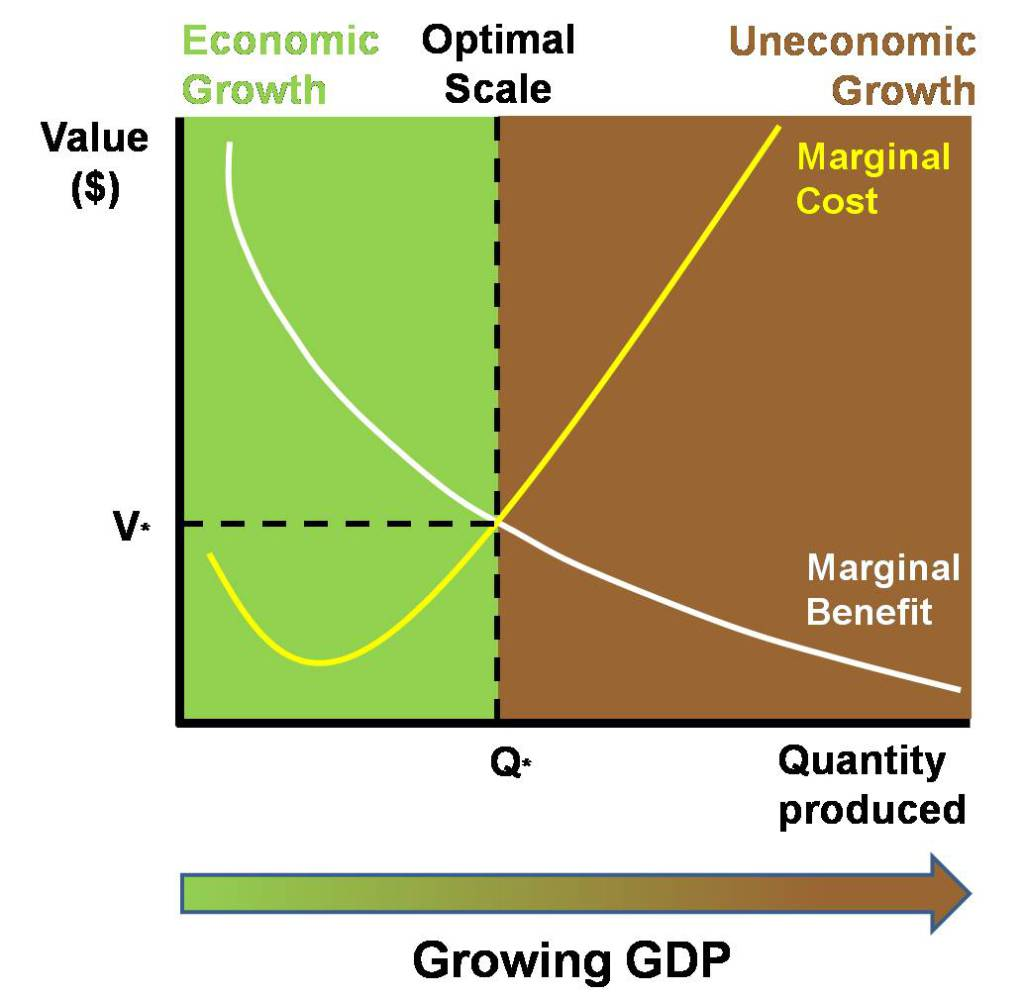
Conceptual diagram used in ecological economics illustrating the idea that the marginal costs of economic growth could surpass its marginal benefits.

Uneconomic growth is economic growth that reflects or creates a decline in the quality of life. The concept is used in human development theory, welfare theory, and ecological economics. It is usually attributed to ecological economist Herman Daly, though other theorists may also be credited for the incipient idea, According to Daly, "uneconomic growth occurs when increases in production come at an expense in resources and well-being that is worth more than the items made."

The cost, or decline in well-being, associated with extended economic growth is argued to arise as a result of "the social and environmental sacrifices made necessary by that growing encroachment on the eco-system."

== Types of growth ==
The rate or type of economic growth may have important consequences for the environment (the climate and natural capital of ecologies). Concerns about possible negative effects of growth on the environment and society have led some to advocate lower levels of growth, from which comes the idea of uneconomic growth and Green parties which argue that economies are part of a global society and a global ecology and cannot outstrip their natural growth without damaging them.

Canadian scientist David Suzuki argued in the 1990s that ecologies can only sustain typically about 1.5–3% new growth per year, and thus any requirement for greater returns from agriculture or forestry will necessarily cannibalize the natural capital of soil or forest. Some think this argument can be applied even to more developed economies.

== The role of technology, and Jevons paradox ==
Mainstream economists would argue that economies are driven by new technology—for instance, we have faster computers today than a year ago, but not necessarily physically more computers. Growth that relies entirely on exploiting increased knowledge rather than exploiting increased resource consumption may thus not qualify as uneconomic growth.

In some cases, this may be true where technology enables lower amounts of input to be used in producing the same unit of product (and/or it reduces the amount or hazardousness of the waste generated per unit product produced) (e.g., the increased availability of movies through the Internet or cable television electronically may reduce the demand for physical video tapes or DVDs for films). Nonetheless, it is crucial to also recognise that innovation- or knowledge-driven growth still may not entirely resolve the problem of scale, or increasing resource consumption. For instance, there might likely be more computers due to greater demand and replacements for slower computers.

The Jevons Paradox is the proposition that technological progress that increases the efficiency with which a resource is used, tends to increase (rather than decrease) the rate of consumption of that resource. For example, given that expenditure on necessities and taxes remain the same, (i) the availability of energy-saving lightbulbs may mean lower electricity usage and fees for a household but this frees up more discretionary, disposable income for additional consumption elsewhere (an example of the "rebound effect") and (ii) technology (or globalisation) that leads to the availability of cheaper goods for consumers also frees up discretionary income for increased consumptive spending.

On the other hand, new renewable energy and climate change mitigation technology (such as artificial photosynthesis) has been argued to promote a prolonged era of human stewardship over ecosystems known as the Sustainocene. In the Sustainocene, "instead of the cargo-cult ideology of perpetual economic growth through corporate pillage of nature, globalised artificial photosynthesis will facilitate a steady state economy and further technological revolutions such as domestic nano-factories and e-democratic input to local communal and global governance structures. In such a world, humans will no longer feel economically threatened, but rather proud, that their moral growth has allowed them to uphold Rights of Nature."

== See also ==
- Agrowth
- Steady-state economy
- Degrowth
- Economic efficiency
- Economic growth
- Measuring well-being
- Genuine progress indicator
- Moral purchasing
- Human development theory
- Ecological economics
- Regenerative economic theory
- Parable of the broken window
