= Mesoamerican Society for Ecological Economics =

Regional chapter of the International Society for Ecological Economics

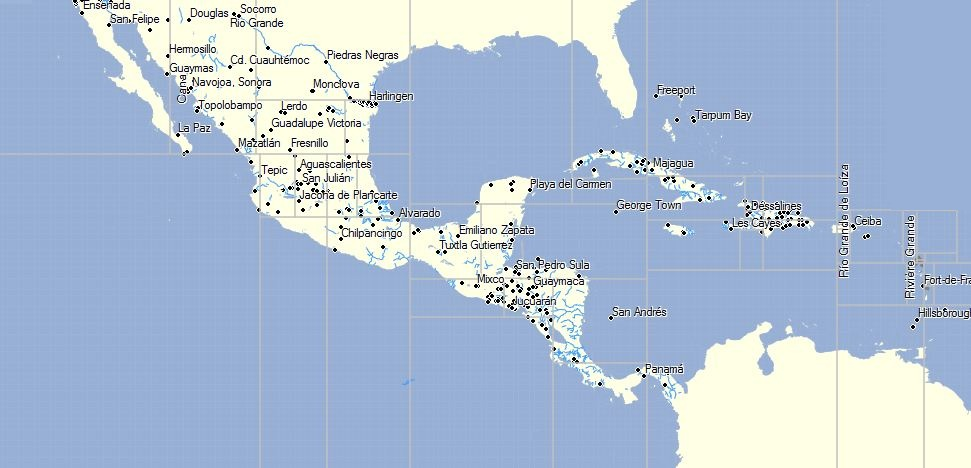
- Abbreviation: SMEE
- Formation: 2008, Guatemala City, Guatemala
- Type: NGO, Biosphere, Academia, Ecological economics, Sustainable development.
- Purpose: Research, Networking, Conferences.
- Headquarters: Curridabat
- Location: Costa Rica, San José, Costa Rica
- Coordinates: 9.925500°N 84.040000°W
- Region served: Mesoamerica
- Members: Public
- Affiliations: ISEE, REDIBEC.
- Website: ecoecomesoamerica.org

The Mesoamerican Society for Ecological Economics (SMEE) is a regional chapter of the International Society for Ecological Economics (ISEE). After its foundation in 2008 at Guatemala City, the organization has already celebrated its first International Conference in 2010 at Mexico City and will carry out the second International Conference, EcoEco Alternatives, between March 4 and 8 2014 at the main campus of the University of Costa Rica.

This branch of the ISEE has a unique emphasis within ecological economics. Topics like social justice and the human value in environmental conservation prevail in this region. As a consequence of the strong influence from Joan Martinez Alier's "environmentalism of the poor or social environmentalism", major attention is given to ecological-distributive conflicts. Alier insists that in the South a struggle exists against these conflicts generated by economic growth, mainly by the North. These endeavors "attempt to preserve the access of the communities to natural resources and services."

On top of the negative effects on the environment by economic distribution, the cultural influence is also widely debated. For instance, the anthropologist Arturo Escobar suggests that culturally-driven preferences are one of the main factors degrading the environment. For example, society naturally gives privilege to the capitalist model that distributes natural resources with the purposes of production and profit, instead of endorsing the agroforestal ecosystem model, which is less harmful to the environment. As part of this alternate perception in Mesoamerica, Ecological economics doesn't consider that the economic valuation of natural resources nor environmental norms are effective solutions to these social-environmental conflicts. On the other hand, an alternative based on community-based conservation and the management of sustainability is more advocated upon. By adding the latter cultural perspective, the three pillars of sustainable development (the social, environmental, and economic) end up being addressed by these proponents.

== History ==
After the second biennial meeting of the International Society for Ecological Economics in 1994 at San José, Costa Rica, several professionals in the region became interested in creating a branch of this organization in their own countries to respond to the increasing development and worsening of socio-environmental conflicts by the conventional-economics-based policies.

However, it wasn't until 2008 that the efforts of the Latin American Social Sciences Institute in Guatemala, the International Center for Political Economy at the National University of Costa Rica, and the Metropolitan Autonomous University of Mexico resulted in the Ecological Economics Forum, May 26 and 27 2008 at Guatemala City, with the participation of zealous youth, students, and 50 professionals of Mesoamerica.

Highly-recognized experts spoke, such as Alejandro Nadal, Coordinator of the working group on the Environment, Macroeconomics, Trade and Investments of the International Union for Conservation of Nature (IUCN); David Barkin and Roberto Constantino from the Metropolitan Autonomous University of Mexico; Eduardo García Frapolli from the Center for Ecosystem Research of the National Autonomous University of Mexico; Bernardo Aguilar of Prescott College, AZ, U.S. and Executive Director of the Fundacion Neotropica in Costa Rica; Miguel Martínez of the World Wide Fund for Nature (WWF Guatemala), and Juan Pablo Castañeda World Bank WAVES and GPS programs.

This meeting undertook the writing of the organization's Constitution and the election of the first Board of Directors. Under the lead of the first President, M. Sc. Iliana Monterroso of Guatemala, the consolidation of the legal inscription and statutes took place.

According to the Forum's participants, the main objectives of the SMEE are to create an open field for discussion of the methodological and theoretical development of Ecological economics, to promote interdisciplinary, multidisciplinary, and transdisciplinary scientific research, and to support academic initiatives related to this thematic in the region.

In 2010, the First International (and Biennial) Conference of the SMEE was celebrated at the Ecological Park of Xochimilco, Mexico City, from November 22 to the 26th. Very influential speakers such as Fander Falconí; David Barkin; Mario Pérez, and Carlos Muñóz Piña lectured about and discussed the Ecological economics platform for the advancement of social justice, environmental justice, and the principles of sustainability.

Since then, the new board of directors has had to deal with a shortage of memberships and the 2008 financial crisis; but despite these challenges, it has achieved important progress in creating its website and completing several ecological economics studies and projects with the Fundacion Neotropica. Furthermore, the organization foresees the inauguration of a professional Master's program on ecological economics and political ecology at the University for International Cooperation and the proceeding of the 2014 EcoEco Alternatives Biennial Conference.

We agree with the premise that the methodological pluralism characteristic of ecological economics must be understood beyond the philosophy of "everything counts." It must respond to epistemology required by the necessities established by the specific context of the conflict within that region.

— Bernardo Aguilar Gonzalez, President's Letter

== EcoEco Alternatives 2014 Conference ==
The Second International Conference of the Mesoamerican Society for Ecological Economics will take place at the Rodrigro Facio campus of the University of Costa Rica from March 4 to the 8th, 2014, with the support of the School of Biology and the Fundacion Neotropica. Its purpose is to further the debate on Ecological economics and to sensitize more people about the importance of the ecological crisis and the solutions proposed by this school of thought.

The Conference's thematic will be "Advancing Towards Alternatives for People and Ecosystems in Latin America". It will include multidisciplinary, interdisciplinary, and transdisciplinary debates about the resolution of social-environmental conflicts, the alternatives within the ecological economics model for handling production and services, and the social conflicts related to the distribution of wealth and gender.
