= Resource-based economy =

Economy whose GNP or GDP comes mainly from natural resources

A resource-based or natural-resource-based economy is that of a country whose gross national product or gross domestic product to a large extent comes from natural resources.

== Examples ==
The economies of Gulf Cooperation Council, GCC, countries like Saudi Arabia, Kuwait and Qatar are highly dependent on exporting oil and gas.

Suriname's exports of bauxite account for more than 15% of GDP and 70% of export earnings. In Australia during 2024 and 2025, mining comprised roughly 10-12% of total GDP and 58-59% of Australia's export earnings, with iron ore, LNG, coal, gold and copper being the most valuable exports.

Of Russian exports, more than 80% are oil, natural gas, metals and timber. Since Russia has a resource-based economy, it depends most of all on the fluctuations of oil and gas demand and prices.

Norway's export of oil and gas forms 45% of total exports and more than 20% of the GDP.

== See also ==
- Natural resource economics
- Resource curse

== Bibliography ==
- Barry C.Field (2000), Natural Resource Economics, McGraw-Hill. ISBN 0-07-231677-2.
- Thomas H. Tietenberg (1988), Environmental and Natural Resource Economics, Scott-Foresman. ISBN 0-673-18945-7.
- Philip A. Neher (1990), Natural Resource Economics: Conservation and Exploitation, Cambridge University Press. ISBN 0-521-31174-8.
- Steven C. Hackett (2001), Environmental and Natural Resources Economics: Theory, Policy, and the Sustainable Society, M.E. Sharpe. ISBN 0-7656-0682-8.
- Erhun Kula (1992), Economics of Natural Resources and the Environment, Springer. ISBN 0-412-36330-5.
- Juan C. Suris Regueiro, Manuel M. Varela Lafuente (1995), Introducción a la economía de los recursos naturales, Civitas. ISBN 84-470-0613-1.
- Pere Riera (2005), Manual de economía ambiental y de los recursos naturales, Thomson. ISBN 84-9732-369-6.
- Carlos Romero (1994), Economía de los recursos ambientales y naturales, Alianza Editorial. ISBN 84-206-6811-7.
- Alan Randall, Ricardo Calvet Perez (1985), Economía de los recursos naturales y política ambiental, Limusa. ISBN 968-18-1727-3.
- Roxana Barrantes (1997), Hacia un nuevo dorado: Economía de los recursos naturales, Consorcio de Investigación Económica. ISBN 9972-670-00-7.
