= Natural Resources Forum =

- Discipline: Environmental studies
- Language: English
- Edited by: David Le Blanc

Publication details
- History: 1976-present
- Publisher: Wiley-Blackwell on behalf of the Division of Sustainable Development in the United Nations Department of Economic and Social Affairs
- Frequency: Quarterly
- Impact factor: 1.292 (2015)

Standard abbreviations
- ISO 4: Nat. Resour. Forum

Indexing
- CODEN: NRFODS
- ISSN: 0165-0203 (print); 1477-8947 (web)
- LCCN: 77641464
- OCLC no.: 604649952

Links
- Journal homepage; Online access; Online archive

Natural Resources Forum is a quarterly peer-reviewed academic journal published by Wiley-Blackwell on behalf of the Division of Sustainable Development in the United Nations Department of Economic and Social Affairs. The journal was established in 1976 and covers issues of sustainable development in developing countries. Specific topics of interest to this journal include agriculture, energy, globalization, and natural resources.

According to the Journal Citation Reports, the journal has a 2015 impact factor of 1.292, ranking it 66th out of 98 journals in the category "Environmental Studies" and 161 out of 216 journals in the category "Environmental sciences".

(It is also the trading name of Natural Resource Events Limited, an independent oil, mining and energy forum for professional investors and advisors in London. This Quarterly event is held in the Royal Institution building in London and was founded by Brian Martin of Opus Executive Partners and is not associated with Wiley-Blackwell.)
