= Douglas McCauley =

American marine biologist

Douglas J McCauley
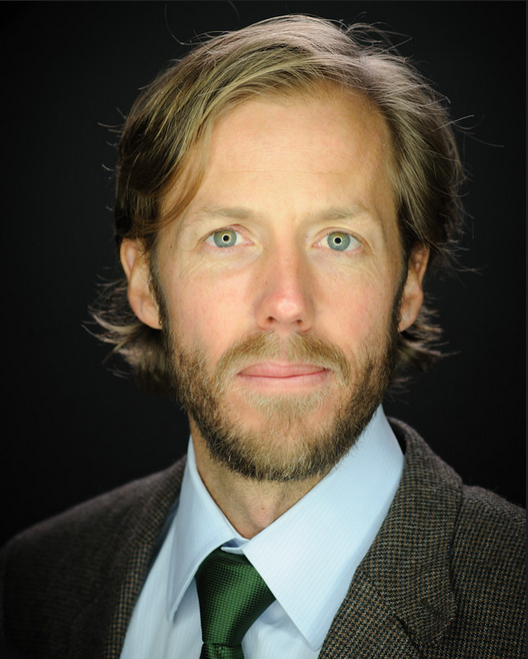
- Born: January 31, 1979 (age 47); Los Angeles, United States
- Education: University of California Berkeley
- Known for: Marine Ecology; Ocean Science
- Awards: Fellow of the Alfred P. Sloan Foundation (2015); Early Career Fellow of the Ecological Society of America (2018)
- Scientific career
- Fields: Marine Biology; Ocean Science; Conservation biology Ecology
- Workplaces: University of California Santa Barbara; Benioff Ocean Initiative

Douglas J. McCauley (born January 31, 1979 Los Angeles, CA) is a professor of ocean science at the University of California Santa Barbara, and serves as the director of the Benioff Ocean Science Laboratory (formerly Benioff Ocean Initiative) – an applied ocean research center based at UC Santa Barbara's Marine Science Institute. His research focuses on using tools from ecology, data science, and marine policy for ocean conservation.

== Education ==
McCauley received a B.A in integrative biology and a B.A. in political science, both from University of California, Berkeley in 2001. He received his Ph.D. in biological sciences at Stanford University in 2010. He conducted postdoctoral research at Stanford University, Princeton University, and University of California, Berkeley.

== Career ==
McCauley began as a deckhand on a fishing boat based in Los Angeles Harbor. Prior to his appointment at UC Santa Barbara, he also worked with the US National Marine Fisheries Service and US Fish and Wildlife Service in Honolulu, Hawaii.

McCauley is a professor at University of California Santa Barbara (Department of Ecology, Evolution and Marine Biology & Marine Science Institute). In 2016 he founded the Benioff Ocean Initiative at UC Santa Barbara with a gift from Marc Benioff and Lynne Benioff – founder and CEO of the cloud computing company Salesforce. The mission of the Benioff Ocean Science Laboratory is to leverage the power of science to solve pressing threats challenging ocean health and inspire the replication of these successes. To date, the organization has taken on a variety of initiatives, including trying to slow the flow of plastic pollution to oceans through the Clean Currents Coalition, using technology to prevent collisions between ships and endangered whales through project Whale Safe, employing artificial intelligence to help spot white sharks at beaches through project SharkEye, creating programs for community scientists to aid in the conservation of endangered ocean species through the Spotting Giant Sea Bass project, and creating transparency tools to track the start of ocean mining.

== Research ==
McCauley's primary areas of research expertise are in the areas of ocean science, conservation biology, and ecology. His pure ecological research has focused on the decline of wild animals in ocean ecosystems, understanding how energy and materials flow across living ecological systems, how species are interlinked in ecological networks, and how humans as a dominant ecological force shape the dynamics of nature. His applied science includes research on how the health of nature affects human nutritional health, disease dynamics, wealth systems, and social justice.

== Public engagement ==
McCauley has been active on topics of ocean health and ecosystem integrity at the United Nations, the World Economic Forum, and the US White House. He serves on the advisory board of the World Economic Forum's Friends of Ocean Action.

== Awards and honors ==
In 2015, McCauley was named an Alfred P Sloan Research Fellow. In 2018, he was named an Early Career Fellow by Ecological Society of America. In 2019, he was awarded UC Santa Barbara's Plous award. He was also named a "Human of the Year" by Vice (magazine) Media.

== Selected works ==
McCauley has published more than 130 publications

Some of his most known publications are as follows:

- McCauley, D. J.; Pinsky ML; Palumbi SR; Estes JA; Joyce FH; Warner RR; et al. (2015). "Marine defaunation: animal loss in the global oceans" (PDF). Science. 347 (5478): 395–396. doi:10.1126/science.1255641.
- McCauley, D. J.; Jablonicky C; Allison EH; Golden CD; Joyce FH; Mayorga J; Kroodsma D; et al. (2018). "Wealthy countries dominate industrial fishing". Science Advances. 4 eaau2161. doi:10.1126/sciadv.aau2161. PMC 6070320.
- Pinsky, M. L.; Eikeset AM; McCauley DJ; Payne JL; Sunday JM; et al. (2019). "Greater vulnerability to warming of marine versus terrestrial ectotherms". Nature. 569: 108–111. doi:10.1038/s41586-019-1132-4.
- McCauley, D. J.; Gellner G; Martinez ND; Williams RJ; Sandin SA; Micheli F; Mumby PJ; McCann KS; et al. (2018). "On the prevalence and dynamics of inverted trophic pyramids and otherwise top-heavy communities". Ecology Letters. 21: 439–454. doi:10.1111/ele.12900.
- McCauley, D. J.; Woods P; Sullivan B; Bergman B; Jablonicky C; Roan A; Hirshfield M; Voerder K; Worm B; et al. (2016). "Ending hide and seek at sea". Science. 351: 1149–1150. doi:10.1126/science.aad5686.
- Payne, J. L.; Bush AM; Heim; Knope ML; McCauley DJ; et al. (2018). "Ecological selectivity of the emerging mass extinction in the oceans" (PDF). Ecology Letters. 353: 6305. doi:10.1126/science.aaf2416.
- Roberts, C. A.; O'Leary BC; McCauley DJ; Cury PM; Duarte CM; Lubchenco J; Pauly D; Saenz-Arroyo A; Wilson RW; Worm B; Castilla JC (2017). "Marine reserves can mitigate and promote adaptation to climate change". Proceedings of the National Academy of Sciences. 114: 6167–6175. doi:10.1073/pnas.1701262114. PMC 5474809.
