= Thomas H. Tietenberg =

American economist and academic

Thomas Harry (Tom) Tietenberg (born 21 October 1942) is an American economist and environmentalist, and Emeritus Professor at Colby College, known for his work in the field of resource-based economy.

== Biography ==
Born in 1942 to Harry Hall and Florence Elaine (Moxley) Tietenberg, Tietenberg obtained his BA in International Affairs at the United States Air Force Academy in 1964. The next year he obtained his MA in Economics from the University of the East. In 1970 he obtained another Msc from the University of Wisconsin–Madison, where in 1971 he also obtained his PhD in economics.

After his graduation Tietenberg started his academic career in 1971 as an assistant professor in economics at Williams College. In 1977 he started at Colby College as an Associate Professor in economics, was promoted to Professor in Economics in 1984, and chaired the department of economics from 1985 to 1988 and from 1993 to 1995. Tietenberg was also principal consultant in the field of environmental policy for national and international government agencies and organizations, such as the World Bank, the Inter-American Development Bank and the United States Environmental Protection Agency. He was one of the speakers at the first Earth Summit in Rio in 1992.

In 1987, Tietenberg cofounded the Association of Environmental and Resource Economists (AERE), serving as its President, in the years 1987–1988. In 2010 the Northeastern Agricultural and Resource Economics Association awarded him the Outstanding Public Service Though Economics award.

== Selected publications ==
- Tietenberg, Thomas H. Emissions trading, an exercise in reforming pollution policy. Resources for the Future, 1985.
- Thomas H. Tietenberg (1988), Environmental and Natural Resource Economics, Scott-Foresman. ISBN 0-673-18945-7.
- Tietenberg, Thomas H., and Lynne Lewis. Environmental economics and policy. New York: Pearson, 2010.
- Thomas H. Tietenberg and Lynne Lewis. Environmental and natural resource economics. Routledge, 2016.

Articles, a selection

- Tietenberg, Thomas H. "Transferable discharge permits and the control of stationary source air pollution: a survey and synthesis." Land economics 56.4 (1980): 391–416.
- Tietenberg, Thomas H. "Economic instruments for environmental regulation." Oxford Review of Economic Policy 6.1 (1990): 17–33.
