= Robert Costanza =

American economist (born 1950)

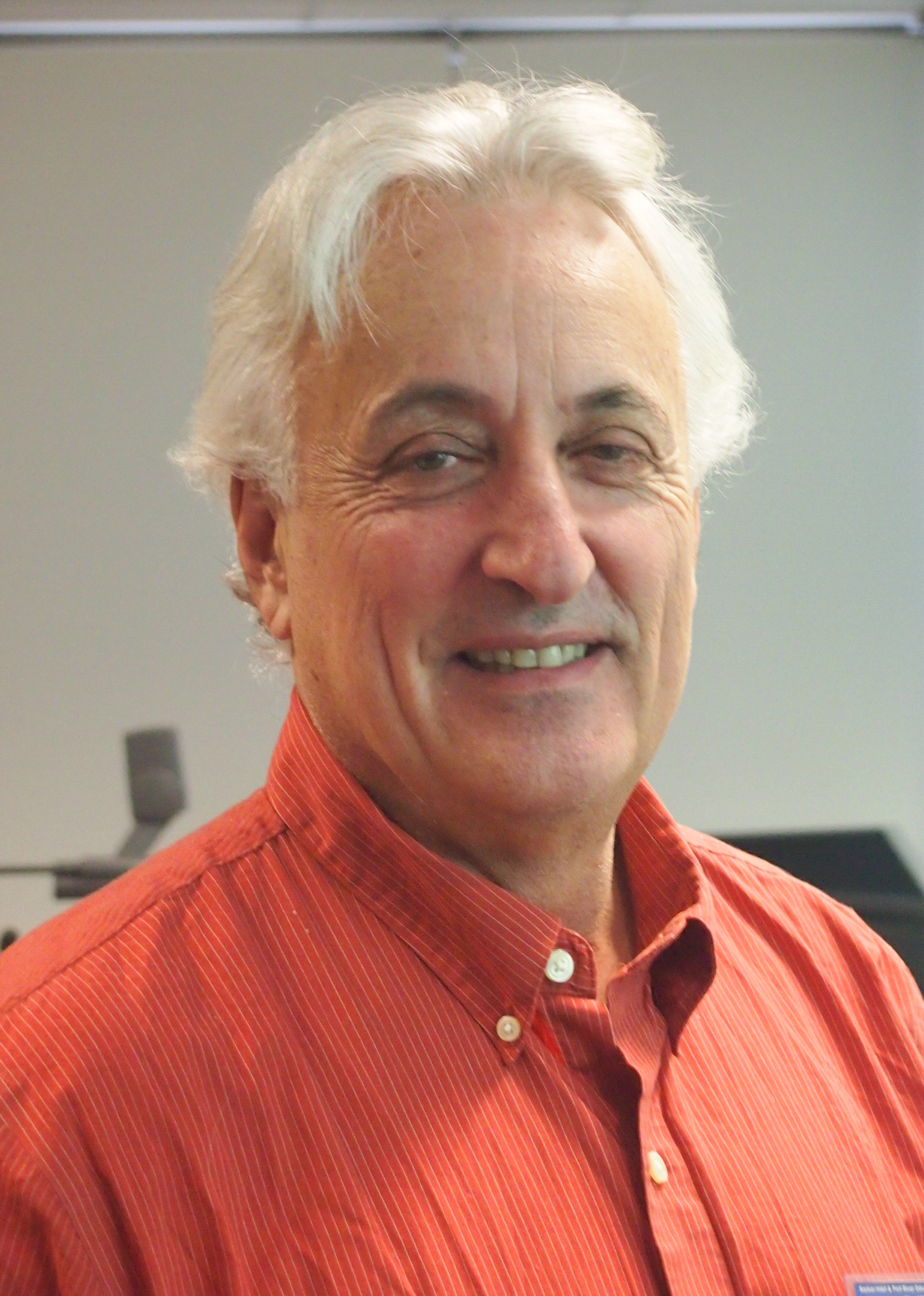
- Born: September 14, 1950 (age 76); Pittsburgh, Pennsylvania, U.S.
- Education: University of Florida (BA in architecture, MA in architecture and urban planning, PhD in environmental engineering sciences)
- Known for: Founder of International Society for Ecological Economics & Ecological Economics journal, Founding Editor-in-Chief of The Solutions Journal
- Awards: Kellogg National Fellow; Pew Scholar; ISEE Kenneth Boulding Award for Ecological Economics
- Scientific career
- Fields: Ecological Economics; Sustainability; Systems Ecology
- Workplaces: The Australian National University; Portland State University; University of Vermont; University of Maryland; Louisiana State University
- Doctoral advisor: H.T. Odum
- Website: RobertCostanza.com

Robert Costanza (born September 14, 1950) is an American/Australian ecological economist and Professor at the UCL Institute for Global Prosperity, University College London. He is a Fellow of the Academy of the Social Sciences in Australia and a Full Member of the Club of Rome.

== Biography ==
Before joining University College London, he was a professor at the Crawford School of Public Policy at The Australian National University in 2013 he was a professor at Portland State University in Oregon from 2010 to 2012. Costanza was the Gund Professor of Ecological Economics and director of the Gund Institute for Ecological Economics at the University of Vermont. Prior to moving to Vermont in August 2002, Costanza was director of the University of Maryland Institute for Ecological Economics, and a professor at University of Maryland's Center for Estuarine and Environmental Science, at the Chesapeake Biological Lab on Solomons Island, MD.

He is co-founder and past president of the International Society for Ecological Economics and he was founding chief editor of the society's journal, Ecological Economics from its inception in 1989 until 2002. Costanza is the founding editor-in-chief of Solutions, a hybrid popular/academic journal/magazine. He currently serves on the editorial board of eight other international academic journals and is past president of the International Society for Ecosystem Health. He is a senior fellow at the Stockholm Resilience Centre, Stockholm, Sweden; Affiliate Fellow at the Gund Institute for Environment at the University of Vermont; and a co-chair of the Ecosystem Services Partnership.

== Selected literature ==
=== Studies ===
- 2016, Modelling and measuring sustainable wellbeing in connection with the UN Sustainable Development Goals

=== Books ===
- 2020, with John D. Erickson, Joshua Farley, and Ida Kubiszewski Sustainable Wellbeing Futures: a research and action agenda for Ecological Economics.
- 2014, with John Cumberland, Herman Daly, Robert Goodland, Richard B. Norgaard, Ida Kubiszewski, and Carol Franco. An Introduction to Ecological Economics, Second Edition.
- 2014, with Ida Kubiszewski (eds). Creating A Sustainable and Desirable Future: Insights from 45 Global Thought Leaders.
- 2013, with Gar Alperovitz, Herman Daly, Joshua Farley, Carol Franco, Tim Jackson, Ida Kubiszewski, Juliet Schor, and Peter Victor. Building a Sustainable and Desirable Economy-in-Society-in-Nature.
- 2007, with Lisa Graumlich and Will Steffen, Sustainability or Collapse? An Integrated History and Future of People on Earth.
- 2000, with Tom Prugh and Herman Daly, The local politics of global sustainability.
- 1997, with John Cumberland, Herman Daly, Robert Goodland and Richard Norgaard, An Introduction to Ecological Economics
- 1996, with Olman Segura and Juan Martinez-Alier, Getting down to earth: practical applications of ecological economics
- 1992, with Bryan Norton and Ben Haskell, Ecosystem health: new goals for environmental management.
- 1991, Ecological economics: The science and management of sustainability.

=== Most prominent articles ===
- 1996, Costanza, R. Ecological economics: reintegrating the study of humans and nature. Ecological Applications 6:978-990 (1996)
- 1997, Costanza et al. The value of the world's ecosystem services and natural capital. Nature 387:253-260 (1997)
- 1998, Costanza et al. Principles for sustainable governance of the oceans. Science 281:198-199 (1998)
- 2008, Costanza, R. Stewardship for a “Full” World. Current History (January 2008) An excellent six-page (including a concise chart) exposition of ecological economics.
- 2010, Costanza et al. The perfect spill: solutions for averting the next Deepwater Horizon, The Solutions Journal
- 2014, Costanza et al. Changes in the global value of ecosystem services, Global Environmental Change
- 2016, Costanza et al. Modelling and measuring sustainable wellbeing in connection with the UN Sustainable Development Goals, Ecological Economics
- 2017, Costanza et al. Twenty years of ecosystem services: how far have we come and how far do we still need to go? Ecosystem Services
- 2021, Costanza et al. Common asset trusts to effectively steward natural capital and ecosystem services at multiple scales, Journal of Environmental Management

== See also ==
- Club of Rome
- Balaton Group
