= Ecological Economics (journal) =

- Discipline: Ecological economics
- Language: English
- Edited by: Stefan Baumgärtner, Begum Özkaynak

Publication details
- History: 1989–present
- Publisher: Elsevier on behalf of the International Society for Ecological Economics
- Frequency: Monthly
- Impact factor: 7.0 (2022)

Standard abbreviations
- ISO 4: Ecol. Econ.

Indexing
- CODEN: ECECEM
- ISSN: 0921-8009
- LCCN: 93650251
- OCLC no.: 163292269

Links
- Journal homepage; Online access

Ecological Economics. The Transdisciplinary Journal of the International Society for Ecological Economics is a peer-reviewed academic journal published by Elsevier on behalf of the International Society for Ecological Economics. It covers research on ecological economics. The journal was established in 1989 by founding editor-in-chief Robert Costanza. The current editors-in-chief are Begum Özkaynak (Bogazici University) and Stefan Baumgärtner (University of Freiburg). The journal is concerned with "extending and integrating the understanding of the interfaces and interplay between 'nature's household' (ecosystems) and 'humanity's household' (the economy)". The journal is transdisciplinary in spirit and emphasizes work that draws on and integrates insights from natural sciences, social sciences and the humanities. Related to economics, the journal includes contributions drawing on both neoclassical and a broad variety of heterodox approaches, which has given rise to lively discussions among the membership over the years.
