= Herman Daly =

American economist (1938–2022)

Herman Edward Daly
- Born: July 21, 1938; Houston, Texas, U.S.
- Died: October 28, 2022 (aged 84); Richmond, Virginia, U.S.
- Spouse: Marcia Damasceno Daly

Academic background
- Education: Rice University; Vanderbilt University
- Influences: Thomas Robert Malthus, John Stuart Mill, Henry George, Irving Fisher, Nicholas Georgescu-Roegen, Kenneth E. Boulding

Academic work
- Discipline: Ecological economics
- Institutions: University of Maryland, College Park; World Bank; Yale University; Louisiana State University
- Notable ideas: Index of Sustainable Economic Welfare; Steady-state economy; Uneconomic growth
- Awards: Blue Planet Prize; Grawemeyer Award; Heineken Prize; ISEE Kenneth Boulding Award for Ecological Economics; Leontief Prize; Right Livelihood Award; Sophie Prize

Herman Edward Daly (July 21, 1938 – October 28, 2022) was an American ecological and Georgist economist and professor at the School of Public Policy of University of Maryland, College Park in the United States, best known for his time as a senior economist at the World Bank from 1988 to 1994. In 1996, he was awarded the Right Livelihood Award for "defining a path of ecological economics that integrates the key elements of ethics, quality of life, environment and community."

== Life and work ==
Daly was born in Houston, Texas in 1938. Before joining the World Bank, Daly was a research associate at Yale University, and Alumni Professor of Economics at Louisiana State University.

Daly was Senior Economist in the Environment Department of the World Bank, where he helped to develop policy guidelines related to sustainable development. While there, he was engaged in environmental operations work in Latin America. He is closely associated with theories of a steady-state economy. He was a co-founder and associate editor of the journal Ecological Economics.

In 1971, Daly was inspired by his professor, Nicholas Georgescu-Reogen, and promoted the Entropy Law and the Economic Process, which conceptualizes the economic process as consumption.

In 1989, Daly and John B. Cobb developed the Index of Sustainable Economic Welfare (ISEW), which they proposed as a more valid measure of socio-economic progress than gross domestic product.

Daly is a recipient of an Honorary Right Livelihood Award, the Heineken Prize for Environmental Science from the Royal Netherlands Academy of Arts and Sciences, the 1992 University of Louisville Grawemeyer Award for Ideas Improving World Order, the Sophie Prize (Norway), the Leontief Prize from the Global Development and Environment Institute, and was chosen as Man of the Year 2008 by Adbusters magazine. He is widely credited with having originated the idea of uneconomic growth, though some credit this to Marilyn Waring who developed it more completely in her study of the UN System of National Accounts. In 2014, Daly was the recipient of the Blue Planet Prize of the Asahi Glass Foundation. He died of a cerebral hemorrhage on October 28, 2022, at the age of 84.

=== Toward a Steady-State Economy ===
Daly was the editor of a long-lived and influential anthology, originally published in 1973 as Toward a Steady-State Economy, and twice revised (under different titles; see bibliography), in 1980 and 1993. Writers and topics in the original 1973 edition included:

- Nicholas Georgescu-Roegen on The Entropy Law and the Economic Process
- Preston Cloud on mineral resources
- Paul R. Ehrlich and John Holdren on population
- Leon R. Kass on bioethics
- Kenneth E. Boulding on the "Economics of the Coming Spaceship Earth"
- Garrett Hardin's 1968 article, "The Tragedy of the Commons"
- Daly on the steady-state economy
- Warren A. Johnson on the guaranteed income as an environmental measure
- Richard England and Barry Bluestone on ecology and social conflict
- William Ophuls on political economy ("Leviathan or oblivion?")
- E. F. Schumacher on Small Is Beautiful (title of his book, also published in 1973)
- Walter A. Weisskopf on economic growth versus existential balance
- Daly's essay, "Electric power, employment, and economic growth: a case study in growthmania"
- Jørgen Randers and Donella Meadows on the carrying capacity of the environment
- John B. Cobb on "ecology, ethics, and theology"
- C.S. Lewis on The Abolition of Man (an extract from his 1943 book of the same name)

=== Death ===
Daly died on October 28, 2022, at the age of 84.

== Selected publications ==
=== Books ===
- Daly, Herman E. (1991) [1977]. Steady-State Economics (2nd ed.). Washington, DC: Island Press. ISBN 978-1-55963-071-9.
- Daly, Herman E.; Cobb, John B. Jr (1994) [1989]. For the Common Good: Redirecting the Economy toward Community, the Environment, and a Sustainable Future (2nd updated and expanded ed.). Boston: Beacon Press. ISBN 978-0-8070-4705-7. Received the Grawemeyer Award for ideas for improving World Order.
- Daly, Herman E. (1996). Beyond Growth: The Economics of Sustainable Development. Boston: Beacon Press. ISBN 978-0-8070-4709-5.
- Prugh, Thomas; Costanza, Robert; Daly, Herman E. (2000). The Local Politics of Global Sustainability. Washington, DC: Island Press. ISBN 978-1-55963-743-5.

=== Biography ===
- Victor, Peter A. (2021). Herman Daly's Economics for a Full World (1st ed.). Abingdon‑on‑Thames, Oxfordshire, United Kingdom: Routledge. ISBN 978-0367556952.

=== Edited anthologies ===
- Daly, Herman E., ed. (1973). Toward a Steady-state Economy. San Francisco: W.H. Freeman. ISBN 978-0-7167-0793-6.
- Daly, Herman E., ed. (1980). Economics, Ecology, Ethics: Essays Toward a Steady-State Economy. San Francisco: W.H. Freeman. ISBN 978-0-7167-1179-7. Revised edition of 1973 anthology.
- Daly, Herman E.; Townsend, Kenneth, eds. (1993). Valuing the Earth: Economics, Ecology, Ethics. Cambridge, MA: MIT Press. ISBN 978-0-262-54068-1. Revised edition of 1980 anthology.

=== Essays ===
- Daly, Herman E. (2000). Ecological Economics and the Ecology of Economics: Essays in Criticism. Cheltenham, UK; Northampton, MA: Edward Elgar. ISBN 978-1-84064-109-7.
- Daly, Herman E. (2007). Ecological Economics and Sustainable Development: Selected Essays of Herman Daly. Advances in Ecological Economics. Cheltenham, UK; Northampton, MA: Edward Elgar. ISBN 978-1-84720-988-7.
- Daly, Herman E. (2014). From Uneconomic Growth to a Steady-State Economy (PDF). Advances in Ecological Economics. Cheltenham, UK; Northampton, MA: Edward Elgar. doi:10.4337/9781783479979. ISBN 978-1-78347-995-5.

=== Textbooks ===
- Daly, Herman E.; Farley, Joshua (2003). Ecological Economics: Principles and Applications (1st ed.). Washington, DC: Island Press. ISBN 978-1-55963-312-3.
- Farley, Joshua; Erickson, Jon D.; Daly, Herman E. (2005). Ecological Economics: a Workbook for Problem-Based Learning. Washington, DC: Island Press. ISBN 978-1-55963-313-0.
- Daly, Herman E.; Farley, Joshua (2010). Ecological Economics: Principles and Applications (2nd ed.). Washington, DC: Island Press. ISBN 978-1-59726-681-9.

=== Articles ===
- Daly, Herman E. (October 1978). "On thinking about energy in the future". Natural Resources Forum. 3 (1): 19–26. Bibcode:1978NRF.....3...19D. doi:10.1111/j.1477-8947.1978.tb00389.x.
- Daly, Herman E. (1 November 1993). "The perils of free trade". Scientific American. 269 (5). Nature Publishing Group: 24–29. Bibcode:1993SciAm.269e..50D. doi:10.1038/scientificamerican1193-50.
- Daly, Herman E.; Jacobs, Michael; Skolimowski, Henryk (February 1995). "Discussion of Wilfred Beckerman's critique of sustainable development". Environmental Values. 4 (1): 49–70. doi:10.3197/096327195776679583.

See also: Beckerman, Wilfred (August 1994). "'Sustainable Development': Is it a useful concept?". Environmental Values. 3 (3): 191–209. doi:10.3197/096327194776679700.

- Daly, Herman E. (September 1997). "Georgescu-Roegen versus Solow/Stiglitz". Ecological Economics. 22 (3): 261–266. Bibcode:1997EcoEc..22..261D. doi:10.1016/S0921-8009(97)00080-3.

See also: Nicholas Georgescu-Roegen, Robert Solow and Joseph Stiglitz.

- Daly, Herman E. (September 2005). "Economics in a full world". Scientific American. 293 (3). Nature Publishing Group: 100–107. Bibcode:2005SciAm.293c.100D. doi:10.1038/scientificamerican0905-100. PMID 16121860. S2CID 13441670.
- Daly, Herman E. (24 April 2008). A steady state economy. Archived from the original on 18 July 2011. Paper presented to the UK Sustainable Development Commission
- Daly, Herman E. (June 2015). "Economics for a Full World". Great Transition Initiative.
- Herman Daly interviewed by David Marchese, 'This Pioneering Economist Says Our Obsession With Growth Must End,' New York Times 17 July 2022

== See also ==
- Ecological economics
- Steady-state economy § Herman Daly's concept of a steady-state economy
- Nicholas Georgescu-Roegen § Criticising Daly's steady-state economics
- Laudato si' § Daly's comment, Daly's comment on the Pope's 2015 encyclical
