= Ecological economics =

Interdependence of human economies and natural ecosystems

Ecological economics, bioeconomics, ecolonomy, eco-economics, or ecol-econ is both a transdisciplinary and an interdisciplinary field of academic research addressing the interdependence and coevolution of human economies and natural ecosystems, both intertemporally and spatially. By treating the economy as a subsystem of Earth's larger ecosystem, and by emphasizing the preservation of natural capital, the field of ecological economics is differentiated from environmental economics, which is the mainstream economic analysis of the environment. One survey of German economists found that ecological and environmental economics are different schools of economic thought, with ecological economists emphasizing strong sustainability and rejecting the proposition that physical (human-made) capital can substitute for natural capital (see the section on weak versus strong sustainability below).

Ecological economics was founded in the 1980s as a modern discipline on the works of and interactions between various European and American academics (see the section on History and development below). The related field of green economics is in general a more politically applied form of the subject.

According to ecological economist Malte Michael Faber, ecological economics is defined by its focus on nature, justice, and time. Issues of intergenerational equity, irreversibility of environmental change, uncertainty of long-term outcomes, and sustainable development guide ecological economic analysis and valuation. Ecological economists have questioned fundamental mainstream economic approaches such as cost-benefit analysis, and the separability of economic values from scientific research, contending that economics is unavoidably normative, i.e. prescriptive, rather than positive or descriptive. Positional analysis, which attempts to incorporate time and justice issues, is proposed as an alternative. Ecological economics shares several of its perspectives with feminist economics, including the focus on sustainability, nature, justice and care values. Karl Marx also commented on relationship between capital and ecology, what is now known as ecosocialism.

== History and development ==
The antecedents of ecological economics can be traced back to the Romantics of the 19th century as well as some Enlightenment political economists of that era. Concerns over population were expressed by Thomas Malthus, while John Stuart Mill predicted the desirability of the stationary state of an economy. Mill thereby anticipated later insights of modern ecological economists, but without having had their experience of the social and ecological costs of the Post–World War II economic expansion. In 1880, Marxian economist Sergei Podolinsky attempted to theorize a labor theory of value based on embodied energy; his work was read and critiqued by Marx and Engels. Otto Neurath developed an ecological approach based on a natural economy whilst employed by the Bavarian Soviet Republic in 1919. He argued that a market system failed to take into account the needs of future generations, and that a socialist economy required calculation in kind, the tracking of all the different materials, rather than synthesising them into money as a general equivalent. In this he was criticised by neo-liberal economists such as Ludwig von Mises and Friedrich Hayek in what became known as the socialist calculation debate.

The debate on energy in economic systems can also be traced back to Nobel prize-winning radiochemist Frederick Soddy (1877–1956). In his book Wealth, Virtual Wealth and Debt (1926), Soddy criticized the prevailing belief of the economy as a perpetual motion machine, capable of generating infinite wealth—a criticism expanded upon by later ecological economists such as Nicholas Georgescu-Roegen and Herman Daly.

European predecessors of ecological economics include K. William Kapp (1950) Karl Polanyi (1944), and Romanian economist Nicholas Georgescu-Roegen (1971). Georgescu-Roegen, who would later mentor Herman Daly at Vanderbilt University, provided ecological economics with a modern conceptual framework based on the material and energy flows of economic production and consumption. His magnum opus, The Entropy Law and the Economic Process (1971), is credited by Daly as a fundamental text of the field, alongside Soddy's Wealth, Virtual Wealth and Debt. Some key concepts of what is now ecological economics are evident in the writings of Kenneth Boulding and E. F. Schumacher, whose book Small Is Beautiful – A Study of Economics as if People Mattered (1973) was published just a few years before the first edition of Herman Daly's comprehensive and persuasive Steady-State Economics (1977).

The first organized meetings of ecological economists occurred in the 1980s. These began in 1982, at the instigation of Lois Banner, with a meeting held in Sweden (including Robert Costanza, Herman Daly, Charles Hall, Bruce Hannon, H.T. Odum, and David Pimentel). Most were ecosystem ecologists or mainstream environmental economists, with the exception of Daly. In 1987, Daly and Costanza edited an issue of Ecological Modeling to test the waters. A book entitled Ecological Economics, by Joan Martinez Alier, was published later that year. Alier renewed interest in the approach developed by Otto Neurath during the interwar period. The year 1989 saw the foundation of the International Society for Ecological Economics and publication of its journal, Ecological Economics, by Elsevier. Robert Costanza was the first president of the society and first editor of the journal, which is currently edited by Richard Howarth. Other figures include ecologists C.S. Holling and H.T. Odum, biologist Gretchen Daily, and physicist Robert Ayres. In the Marxian tradition, sociologist John Bellamy Foster and CUNY geography professor David Harvey explicitly center ecological concerns in political economy.

Articles by Inge Ropke (2004, 2005) and Clive Spash (1999) cover the development and modern history of ecological economics and explain its differentiation from resource and environmental economics, as well as some of the controversy between American and European schools of thought. An article by Robert Costanza, David Stern, Lining He, and Chunbo Ma responded to a call by Mick Common to determine the foundational literature of ecological economics by using citation analysis to examine which books and articles have had the most influence on the development of the field. However, citations analysis has itself proven controversial and similar work has been criticized by Clive Spash for attempting to pre-determine what is regarded as influential in ecological economics through study design and data manipulation. In addition, the journal Ecological Economics has itself been criticized for swamping the field with mainstream economics.

=== Schools of thought ===
Various competing schools of thought exist in the field. Some are close to resource and environmental economics while others are far more heterodox in outlook. An example of the latter is the European Society for Ecological Economics. An example of the former is the Swedish Beijer International Institute of Ecological Economics. Clive Spash has argued for the classification of the ecological economics movement, and more generally work by different economic schools on the environment, into three main categories. These are the mainstream new resource economists, the new environmental pragmatists, and the more radical social ecological economists. International survey work comparing the relevance of the categories for mainstream and heterodox economists shows some clear divisions between environmental and ecological economists. A growing field of radical social-ecological theory is degrowth economics.

Degrowth addresses both biophysical limits and global inequality while rejecting neoliberal economics. Degrowth prioritizes grassroots initiatives in progressive socio-ecological goals, adhering to ecological limits by shrinking the human ecological footprint (see Differences from Mainstream Economics below). It involves an equitable downscale in both production and consumption of resources in order to adhere to biophysical limits. Degrowth draws from Marxian economics, citing the growth of efficient systems as the alienation of nature and man. Economic movements like degrowth reject the idea of growth itself. Some degrowth theorists call for an "exit of the economy". Critics of the degrowth movement include new resource economists, who point to the gaining momentum of sustainable development. These economists highlight the positive aspects of a green economy, which include equitable access to renewable energy and a commitment to eradicate global inequality through sustainable development (See Green Economics). Examples of heterodox ecological economic experiments include the Catalan Integral Cooperative and the Solidarity Economy Networks in Italy. Both of these grassroots movements use communitarian based economies and consciously reduce their ecological footprint by limiting material growth and adapting to regenerative agriculture.

==== Non-traditional approaches to ecological economics ====
Cultural and heterodox applications of economic interaction around the world have begun to be included as ecological economic practices. E.F. Schumacher introduced examples of non-western economic ideas to mainstream thought in his book, Small is Beautiful, where he addresses neoliberal economics through the lens of natural harmony in Buddhist economics. This emphasis on natural harmony is witnessed in diverse cultures across the globe. Buen Vivir is a traditional socio-economic movement in South America that rejects the western development model of economics. Meaning Good Life, Buen Vivir emphasizes harmony with nature, diverse cultural pluralism, coexistence, and inseparability of nature and material. Value is not attributed to material accumulation, and it instead takes a more spiritual and communitarian approach to economic activity. Ecological Swaraj originated out of India, and is an evolving world view of human interactions within the ecosystem. This train of thought respects physical bio-limits and non-human species, pursuing equity and social justice through direct democracy and grassroots leadership. Social well-being is paired with spiritual, physical, and material well-being. These movements are unique to their region, but the values can be seen across the globe in indigenous traditions, such as the Ubuntu Philosophy in South Africa.

=== Differences from mainstream economics ===
Ecological economics differs from mainstream economics in that it heavily reflects on the ecological footprint of human interactions in the economy. This footprint is measured by the impact of human activities on natural resources and the waste generated in the process. Ecological economists aim to minimize the ecological footprint, taking into account the scarcity of global and regional resources and their accessibility to an economy. Some ecological economists prioritise adding natural capital to the typical capital asset analysis of land, labor, and financial capital. These ecological economists use tools from mathematical economics, as in mainstream economics, but may apply them more closely to the natural world. Whereas mainstream economists tend to be technological optimists, ecological economists are inclined to be technological sceptics. They reason that the natural world has a limited carrying capacity and that its resources may run out. Since destruction of important environmental resources could be practically irreversible and catastrophic, ecological economists are inclined to justify cautionary measures based on the precautionary principle. As ecological economists try to minimize these potential disasters, calculating the fallout of environmental destruction becomes a humanitarian issue as well. Already, the Global South has seen trends of mass migration due to environmental changes. Climate refugees from the Global South are adversely affected by changes in the environment, and some scholars point to global wealth inequality within the current neoliberal economic system as a source of this issue.

The most cogent example of how the different theories treat similar assets is tropical rainforest ecosystems, most obviously the Yasuni region of Ecuador. While this area has substantial deposits of bitumen it is also one of the most diverse ecosystems on Earth and some estimates establish it has over 200 undiscovered medical substances in its genomes – most of which would be destroyed by logging the forest or mining the bitumen. Effectively, the instructional capital of the genomes is undervalued by analyses that view the rainforest primarily as a source of wood, oil/tar and perhaps food. Increasingly the carbon credit for leaving the extremely carbon-intensive ("dirty") bitumen in the ground is also valued – the government of Ecuador set a price of US$350 million for an oil lease with the intent of selling it to someone committed to never exercising it at all and instead preserving the rainforest.

While this natural capital and ecosystems services approach has proven popular amongst many it has also been contested as failing to address the underlying problems with mainstream economics, growth, market capitalism and monetary valuation of the environment. Critiques concern the need to create a more meaningful relationship with Nature and the non-human world than evident in the instrumentalism of shallow ecology and the environmental economists commodification of everything external to the market system.

== Nature and ecology ==
Natural resources flow through the economy and end up as waste and pollution.

A simple circular flow of income diagram is replaced in ecological economics by a more complex flow diagram reflecting the input of solar energy, which sustains natural inputs and environmental services which are then used as units of production. Once consumed, natural inputs pass out of the economy as pollution and waste. The potential of an environment to provide services and materials is referred to as an "environment's source function", and this function is depleted as resources are consumed or pollution contaminates the resources. The "sink function" describes an environment's ability to absorb and render harmless waste and pollution: when waste output exceeds the limit of the sink function, long-term damage occurs. Some persistent pollutants, such as some organic pollutants and nuclear waste are absorbed very slowly or not at all; ecological economists emphasize minimizing "cumulative pollutants". Pollutants affect human health and the health of the ecosystem.

The economic value of natural capital and ecosystem services is accepted by mainstream environmental economics, but is emphasized as especially important in ecological economics. Ecological economists may begin by estimating how to maintain a stable environment before assessing the cost in dollar terms. Ecological economist Robert Costanza led an attempted valuation of the global ecosystem in 1997. Initially published in Nature, the article concluded on $33 trillion with a range from $16 trillion to $54 trillion (in 1997, total global GDP was $27 trillion). Half of the value went to nutrient cycling. The open oceans, continental shelves, and estuaries had the highest total value, and the highest per-hectare values went to estuaries, swamps/floodplains, and seagrass/algae beds. The work was criticized by articles in Ecological Economics Volume 25, Issue 1, but critics acknowledged the positive potential for economic valuation of the global ecosystem.

The Earth's carrying capacity is a central issue in ecological economics. Early economists, such as Thomas Malthus, pointed out the finite carrying capacity of the earth, which was also central to the MIT study Limits to Growth. Diminishing returns suggest that productivity increases will slow if major technological progress is not made. Food production may become a problem, as erosion, an impending water crisis, and soil salinity (from irrigation) reduce the productivity of agriculture. Ecological economists argue that industrial agriculture, which exacerbates these problems, is not sustainable agriculture, and are generally inclined favorably to organic farming, which also reduces the output of carbon.

Global wild fisheries are believed to have peaked and begun a decline, with valuable habitat such as estuaries in critical condition. The aquaculture or farming of piscivorous fish, like salmon, does not help solve the problem because they need to be fed products from other fish. Studies have shown that salmon farming has major negative impacts on wild salmon, as well as the forage fish that need to be caught to feed them.

Since animals are higher on the trophic level, they are less efficient sources of food energy. Reduced consumption of meat would reduce the demand for food, but as nations develop, they tend to adopt high-meat diets similar to that of the United States. Genetically modified food (GMF) is a conventional solution to the problem, but it presents numerous problems – Bt corn produces its own Bacillus thuringiensis toxin/protein, but pest resistance to the toxin is believed to be imminent.

Climate change is now widely acknowledged as a major issue, with all national scientific academies expressing agreement on the importance of the issue. As the population growth intensifies and energy demand increases, the world faces an energy crisis. Some economists and scientists forecast a global ecological crisis if energy use is not contained – the Stern report is an example. The disagreement has sparked a vigorous debate on issue of discounting and intergenerational equity.

GLOBAL GEOCHEMICAL CYCLES CRITICAL FOR LIFE

Nitrogen cycle

Water cycle

Carbon cycle

Oxygen cycle

== Ethics ==
Mainstream economics has attempted to become a value-free 'hard science', but ecological economists argue that value-free economics is generally not realistic. Ecological economics is more willing to entertain alternative conceptions of utility, efficiency, and cost-benefits such as positional analysis or multi-criteria analysis. Ecological economics is typically viewed as economics for sustainable development, and may have goals similar to green politics.

=== Green economics ===
In international, regional, and national policy circles, the concept of the green economy grew in popularity as a response to the financial predicament at first then became a vehicle for growth and development.

The United Nations Environment Programme (UNEP) defines a 'green economy' as one that focuses on the human aspects and natural influences and an economic order that can generate high-salary jobs. In 2011, its definition was further developed as the word 'green' is made to refer to an economy that is not only resourceful and well-organized but also impartial, guaranteeing an objective shift to an economy that is low-carbon, resource-efficient, and socially-inclusive.

The ideas and studies regarding the green economy denote a fundamental shift for more effective, resourceful, environment-friendly and resource‐saving technologies that could lessen emissions and alleviate the adverse consequences of climate change, at the same time confront issues about resource exhaustion and grave environmental dilapidation.

As an indispensable requirement and vital precondition to realizing sustainable development, the Green Economy adherents robustly promote good governance. To boost local investments and foreign ventures, it is crucial to have a constant and foreseeable macroeconomic atmosphere. Likewise, such an environment will also need to be transparent and accountable. In the absence of a substantial and solid governance structure, the prospect of shifting towards a sustainable development route would be insignificant. In achieving a green economy, competent institutions and governance systems are vital in guaranteeing the efficient execution of strategies, guidelines, campaigns, and programmes.

Shifting to a Green Economy requires a shift in business practices and new approaches to economic activity. It likewise necessitates new capacities, skills set from labor and professionals who can competently function across sectors, and able to work as effective components within multi-disciplinary teams. To achieve this goal, vocational training packages must be developed with focus on greening the sectors. Simultaneously, the educational system needs to be assessed as well in order to fit in the environmental and social considerations of various disciplines.

== Topics ==
Among the topics addressed by ecological economics are methodology, allocation of resources, weak versus strong sustainability, energy economics, energy accounting and balance, environmental services, cost shifting, modeling, and monetary policy.

=== Methodology ===
A primary objective of ecological economics (EE) is to ground economic thinking and practice in physical reality, especially in the laws of physics (particularly the laws of thermodynamics) and in knowledge of biological systems. It accepts as a goal the improvement of human well-being through development, and seeks to ensure achievement of this through planning for the sustainable development of ecosystems and societies. Of course the terms development and sustainable development are far from lacking controversy. Richard B. Norgaard argues traditional economics has hi-jacked the development terminology in his book Development Betrayed.

Well-being in ecological economics is also differentiated from welfare as found in mainstream economics and the 'new welfare economics' from the 1930s which informs resource and environmental economics. This entails a limited preference utilitarian conception of value i.e., Nature is valuable to our economies, that is because people will pay for its services such as clean air, clean water, encounters with wilderness, etc.

Ecological economics is distinguishable from neoclassical economics primarily by its assertion that the economy is embedded within an environmental system. Ecology deals with the energy and matter transactions of life and the Earth, and the human economy is by definition contained within this system. Ecological economists argue that neoclassical economics has ignored the environment, at best considering it to be a subset of the human economy.

The neoclassical view ignores much of what the natural sciences have taught us about the contributions of nature to the creation of wealth e.g., the planetary endowment of scarce matter and energy, along with the complex and biologically diverse ecosystems that provide goods and ecosystem services directly to human communities: micro- and macro-climate regulation, water recycling, water purification, storm water regulation, waste absorption, food and medicine production, pollination, protection from solar and cosmic radiation, the view of a starry night sky, etc.

There has then been a move to regard such things as natural capital and ecosystems functions as goods and services. However, this is far from uncontroversial within ecology or ecological economics due to the potential for narrowing down values to those found in mainstream economics and the danger of merely regarding Nature as a commodity. This has been referred to as ecologists 'selling out on Nature'. There is then a concern that ecological economics has failed to learn from the extensive literature in environmental ethics about how to structure a plural value system.

=== Allocation of resources ===
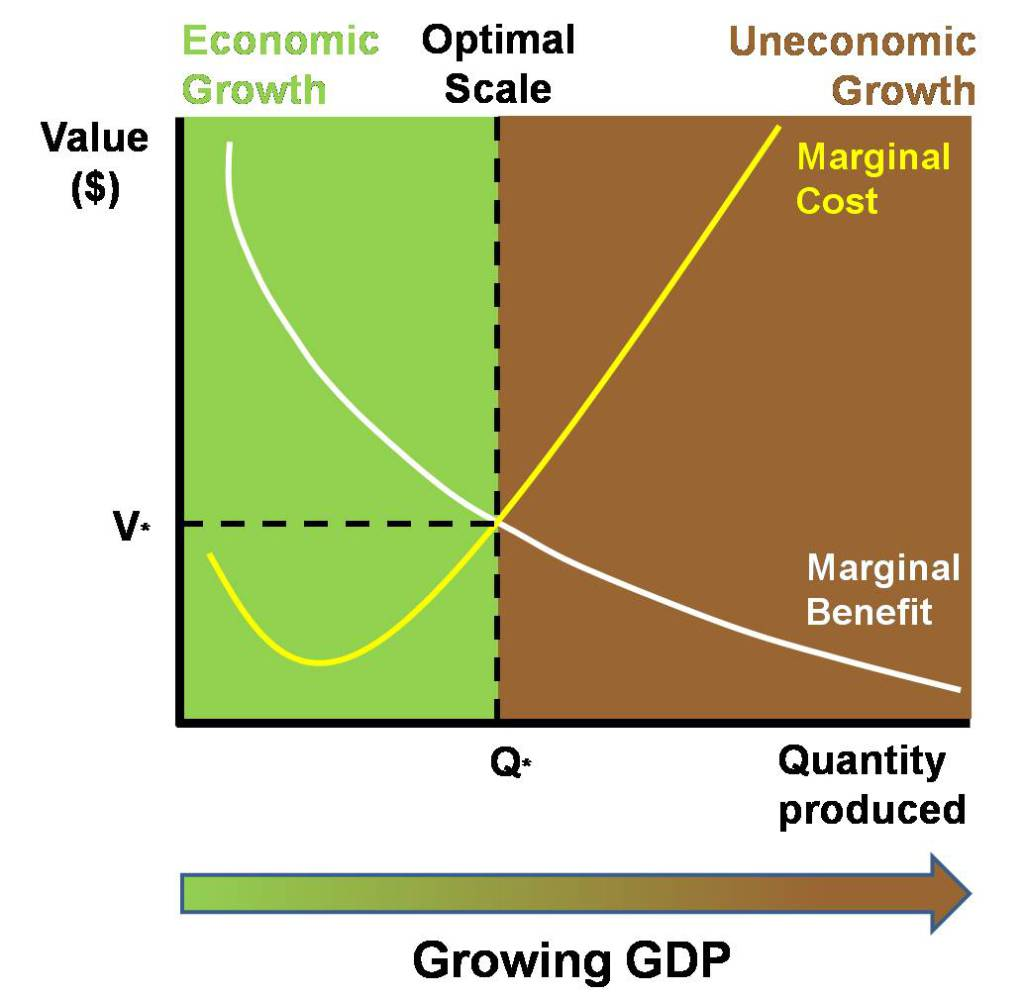
Conceptual diagram illustrating the idea that the marginal costs of economic growth could surpass its marginal benefits.

Resource and neoclassical economics focus primarily on the efficient allocation of resources and less on the two other problems of importance to ecological economics: distribution (equity), and the scale of the economy relative to the ecosystems upon which it relies. Ecological economics makes a clear distinction between growth (quantitative increase in economic output) and development (qualitative improvement of the quality of life), while arguing that neoclassical economics confuses the two. Ecological economists point out that beyond modest levels, increased per-capita consumption (the typical economic measure of "standard of living") may not always lead to improvement in human well-being, but may have harmful effects on the environment and broader societal well-being. This situation is sometimes referred to as uneconomic growth (see diagram above).

=== Weak versus strong sustainability ===
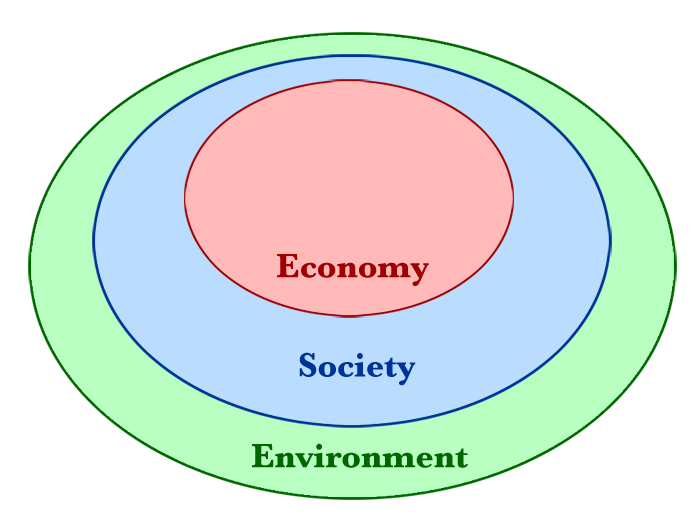
The three nested systems of sustainability - the economy wholly contained by society, wholly contained by the biophysical environment. Clickable.

Ecological economics challenges the conventional approach towards natural resources, claiming that it undervalues natural capital by considering it as interchangeable with human-made capital—labor and technology.

The impending depletion of natural resources and increase of climate-changing greenhouse gasses should motivate us to examine how political, economic and social policies can benefit from alternative energy. Shifting dependence on fossil fuels with specific interest within just one of the above-mentioned factors easily benefits at least one other. For instance, photo voltaic (or solar) panels have a 15% efficiency when absorbing the sun's energy, but its construction demand has increased 120% within both commercial and residential properties. Additionally, this construction has led to a roughly 30% increase in work demands (Chen).

The potential for the substitution of man-made capital for natural capital is an important debate in ecological economics and the economics of sustainability. There is a continuum of views among economists between the strongly neoclassical positions of Robert Solow and Martin Weitzman, at one extreme and the 'entropy pessimists', notably Nicholas Georgescu-Roegen and Herman Daly, at the other.

Neoclassical economists tend to maintain that man-made capital can, in principle, replace all types of natural capital. This is known as the weak sustainability view, essentially that every technology can be improved upon or replaced by innovation, and that there is a substitute for any and all scarce materials.

At the other extreme, the strong sustainability view argues that the stock of natural resources and ecological functions are irreplaceable. From the premises of strong sustainability, it follows that economic policy has a fiduciary responsibility to the greater ecological world, and that sustainable development must therefore take a different approach to valuing natural resources and ecological functions.

Recently, Stanislav Shmelev developed a new methodology for the assessment of progress at the macro scale based on multi-criteria methods, which allows consideration of different perspectives, including strong and weak sustainability or conservationists vs industrialists and aims to search for a 'middle way' by providing a strong neo-Keynesian economic push without putting excessive pressure on the natural resources, including water or producing emissions, both directly and indirectly.

=== Energy economics ===
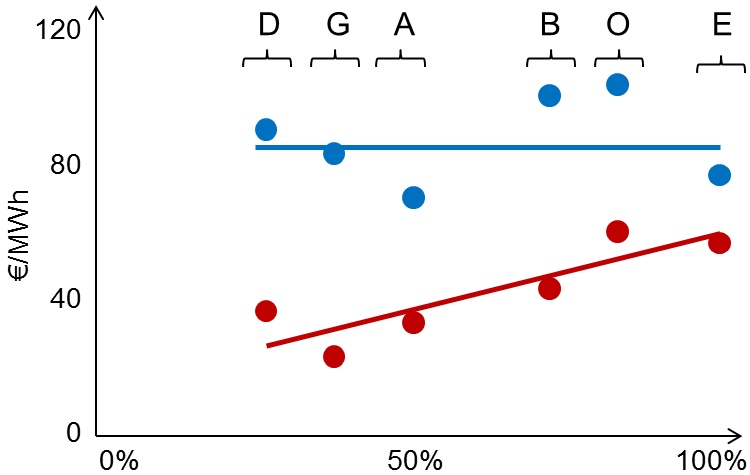
Exergy analysis can be performed to find connections between economic value and the physical world. Here the costs of heating (vertical axis) are compared with the exergy content of different energy carriers (horizontal axis). Red dots and trend line indicate energy prices for consumers, blue dots and trend line indicate total price for consumers including capital expenditure for the heating system. Energy carriers included are district heating (D), ground-source heat pump (G), exhaust air heat pump (A), bioenergy meaning firewood (B), heating oil (O) and direct electric heating (E).

A key concept of energy economics is net energy gain, which recognizes that all energy sources require an initial energy investment in order to produce energy. To be useful the energy return on energy invested (EROEI) has to be greater than one. The net energy gain from the production of coal, oil and gas has declined over time as the easiest to produce sources have been most heavily depleted. In traditional energy economics, surplus energy is often seen as something to be capitalized on—either by storing for future use or by converting it into economic growth.

Ecological economics generally rejects the view of energy economics that growth in the energy supply is related directly to well-being, focusing instead on biodiversity and creativity – or natural capital and individual capital, in the terminology sometimes adopted to describe these economically. In practice, ecological economics focuses primarily on the key issues of uneconomic growth and quality of life. Ecological economists are inclined to acknowledge that much of what is important in human well-being is not analyzable from a strictly economic standpoint and suggests an interdisciplinary approach combining social and natural sciences as a means to address this. When considering surplus energy, ecological economists state this could be used for activities that do not directly contribute to economic productivity but instead enhance societal and environmental well-being. This concept of dépense, as developed by Georges Bataille, offers a novel perspective on the management of surplus energy within economies. This concept encourages a shift from growth-centric models to approaches that prioritise sustainable and meaningful expenditures of excess resources.

Thermoeconomics is based on the proposition that the role of energy in biological evolution should be defined and understood through the second law of thermodynamics, but also in terms of such economic criteria as productivity, efficiency, and especially the costs and benefits (or profitability) of the various mechanisms for capturing and utilizing available energy to build biomass and do work. As a result, thermoeconomics is often discussed in the field of ecological economics, which itself is related to the fields of sustainability and sustainable development.

Exergy analysis is performed in the field of industrial ecology to use energy more efficiently. The term exergy, was coined by Zoran Rant in 1956, but the concept was developed by J. Willard Gibbs. In recent decades, utilization of exergy has spread outside of physics and engineering to the fields of industrial ecology, ecological economics, systems ecology, and energetics.

=== Energy accounting and balance ===
An energy balance can be used to track energy through a system, and is a very useful tool for determining resource use and environmental impacts, using the First and Second laws of thermodynamics, to determine how much energy is needed at each point in a system, and in what form that energy is a cost in various environmental issues. The energy accounting system keeps track of energy in, energy out, and non-useful energy versus work done, and transformations within the system.

Scientists have written and speculated on different aspects of energy accounting.

=== Ecosystem services and their valuation ===
Ecological economists agree that ecosystems produce enormous flows of goods and services to human beings, playing a key role in producing well-being. At the same time, there is intense debate about how and when to place values on these benefits.

A study was carried out by Costanza and colleagues to determine the 'value' of the services provided by the environment. This was determined by averaging values obtained from a range of studies conducted in very specific context and then transferring these without regard to that context. Dollar figures were averaged to a per hectare number for different types of ecosystem e.g. wetlands, oceans. A total was then produced which came out at 33 trillion US dollars (1997 values), more than twice the total GDP of the world at the time of the study. This study was criticized by pre-ecological and even some environmental economists – for being inconsistent with assumptions of financial capital valuation – and ecological economists – for being inconsistent with an ecological economics focus on biological and physical indicators.

The whole idea of treating ecosystems as goods and services to be valued in monetary terms remains controversial. A common objection is that life is precious or priceless, but this demonstrably degrades to it being worthless within cost-benefit analysis and other standard economic methods. Reducing human bodies to financial values is a necessary part of mainstream economics and not always in the direct terms of insurance or wages. One example of this in practice is the value of a statistical life, which is a dollar value assigned to one life used to evaluate the costs of small changes in risk to life–such as exposure to one pollutant. Economics, in principle, assumes that conflict is reduced by agreeing on voluntary contractual relations and prices instead of simply fighting or coercing or tricking others into providing goods or services. In doing so, a provider agrees to surrender time and take bodily risks and other (reputation, financial) risks. Ecosystems are no different from other bodies economically except insofar as they are far less replaceable than typical labour or commodities.

Despite these issues, many ecologists and conservation biologists are pursuing ecosystem valuation. Biodiversity measures in particular appear to be the most promising way to reconcile financial and ecological values, and there are many active efforts in this regard. The growing field of biodiversity finance began to emerge in 2008 in response to many specific proposals such as the Ecuadoran Yasuni proposal or similar ones in the Congo. US news outlets treated the stories as a "threat" to "drill a park" reflecting a previously dominant view that NGOs and governments had the primary responsibility to protect ecosystems. However Peter Barnes and other commentators have recently argued that a guardianship/trustee/commons model is far more effective and takes the decisions out of the political realm.

Commodification of other ecological relations as in carbon credit and direct payments to farmers to preserve ecosystem services are likewise examples that enable private parties to play more direct roles protecting biodiversity, but is also controversial in ecological economics. The United Nations Food and Agriculture Organization achieved near-universal agreement in 2008 that such payments directly valuing ecosystem preservation and encouraging permaculture were the only practical way out of a food crisis. The holdouts were all English-speaking countries that export GMOs and promote "free trade" agreements that facilitate their own control of the world transport network: The US, UK, Canada and Australia.

=== Not 'externalities', but cost shifting ===
Ecological economics is founded upon the view that the neoclassical economics (NCE) assumption that environmental and community costs and benefits are mutually canceling "externalities" is not warranted. Joan Martinez Alier, for instance shows that the bulk of consumers are automatically excluded from having an impact upon the prices of commodities, as these consumers are future generations who have not been born yet. The assumptions behind future discounting, which assume that future goods will be cheaper than present goods, has been criticized by David Pearce and by the recent Stern Report (although the Stern report itself does employ discounting and has been criticized for this and other reasons by ecological economists such as Clive Spash).

Concerning these externalities, some like the eco-businessman Paul Hawken argue an orthodox economic line that the only reason why goods produced unsustainably are usually cheaper than goods produced sustainably is due to a hidden subsidy, paid by the non-monetized human environment, community or future generations. These arguments are developed further by Hawken, Amory and Hunter Lovins to promote their vision of an environmental capitalist utopia in Natural Capitalism: Creating the Next Industrial Revolution.

In contrast, ecological economists, like Joan Martinez-Alier, appeal to a different line of reasoning. Rather than assuming some (new) form of capitalism is the best way forward, an older ecological economic critique questions the very idea of internalizing externalities as providing some corrective to the current system. The work by Karl William Kapp explains why the concept of "externality" is a misnomer. In fact the modern business enterprise operates on the basis of shifting costs onto others as normal practice to make profits. Charles Eisenstein has argued that this method of privatising profits while socialising the costs through externalities, passing the costs to the community, to the natural environment or to future generations is inherently destructive. As social ecological economist Clive Spash has noted, externality theory fallaciously assumes environmental and social problems are minor aberrations in an otherwise perfectly functioning efficient economic system. Internalizing the odd externality does nothing to address the structural systemic problem and fails to recognize the all pervasive nature of these supposed 'externalities'.

=== Ecological-economic modeling ===
Mathematical modeling is a powerful tool that is used in ecological economic analysis. Various approaches and techniques include: evolutionary, input-output, neo-Austrian modeling, entropy and thermodynamic models, multi-criteria, and agent-based modeling, the environmental Kuznets curve, and Stock-Flow consistent model frameworks. System dynamics and GIS are techniques applied, among other, to spatial dynamic landscape simulation modeling. The Matrix accounting methods of Christian Felber provide a more sophisticated method for identifying "the common good"

=== Monetary theory and policy ===
Ecological economics draws upon its work on resource allocation and strong sustainability to address monetary policy. Drawing upon a transdisciplinary literature, ecological economics roots its policy work in monetary theory and its goals of sustainable scale, just distribution, and efficient allocation. Ecological economics' work on monetary theory and policy can be traced to Frederick Soddy's work on money. The field considers questions such as the growth imperative of interest-bearing debt, the nature of money, and alternative policy proposals such as alternative currencies and public banking.

== Criticism ==
Assigning monetary value to natural resources such as biodiversity, and the emergent ecosystem services is often viewed as a key process in influencing economic practices, policy, and decision-making. While this idea is becoming more and more accepted among ecologists and conservationist, some argue that it is inherently false.

McCauley argues that ecological economics and the resulting ecosystem service based conservation can be harmful. He describes four main problems with this approach:

Firstly, it seems to be assumed that all ecosystem services are financially beneficial. This is undermined by a basic characteristic of ecosystems: they do not act specifically in favour of any single species. While certain services might be very useful to us, such as coastal protection from hurricanes by mangroves for example, others might cause financial or personal harm, such as wolves hunting cattle. The complexity of Eco-systems makes it challenging to weigh up the value of a given species. Wolves play a critical role in regulating prey populations; the absence of such an apex predator in the Scottish Highlands has caused the over population of deer, preventing afforestation, which increases the risk of flooding and damage to property.

Secondly, allocating monetary value to nature would make its conservation reliant on markets that fluctuate. This can lead to devaluation of services that were previously considered financially beneficial. Such is the case of the bees in a forest near former coffee plantations in Finca Santa Fe, Costa Rica. The pollination services were valued to over US$60,000 a year, but soon after the study, coffee prices dropped and the fields were replanted with pineapple. Pineapple does not require bees to be pollinated, so the value of their service dropped to zero.

Thirdly, conservation programmes for the sake of financial benefit underestimate human ingenuity to invent and replace ecosystem services by artificial means. McCauley argues that such proposals are deemed to have a short lifespan as the history of technology is about how humanity developed artificial alternatives to nature's services and with time passing the cost of such services tend to decrease. This would also lead to the devaluation of ecosystem services.

Lastly, it should not be assumed that conserving ecosystems is always financially beneficial as opposed to alteration. In the case of the introduction of the Nile perch to Lake Victoria, the ecological consequence was decimation of native fauna. However, this same event is praised by the local communities as they gain significant financial benefits from trading the fish.

McCauley argues that, for these reasons, trying to convince decision-makers to conserve nature for monetary reasons is not the path to be followed, and instead appealing to morality is the ultimate way to campaign for the protection of nature.

== See also ==
- Agroecology
- Circular economy
- Critique of political economy
- Deep ecology
- Earth Economics (policy think tank)
- Eco-economic decoupling
- Eco-socialism
- Ecofeminism
- Ecological economists (category)
- Ecological model of competition
- Ecological values of mangrove
- Energy quality
- Harrington paradox
- Green accounting
- Gund Institute for Ecological Economics
- Index of Sustainable Economic Welfare
- International Society for Ecological Economics
- Natural capital accounting
- Natural resource economics
- Outline of green politics
- Social metabolism
- Spaceship Earth
- Steady-state economy
