= Environmental policy =

Government efforts protecting the natural environment

Environmental policy is the pledge by governments or organizations to adopt laws, regulations, and other mechanisms concerning environmental issues. These typically involve air and water pollution, waste management, ecosystem management, biodiversity conservation, the management of natural resources, and safeguarding wildlife and endangered species. For example, concerning environmental policy, the implementation of an eco-energy-oriented policy at a global level to address the issue of climate change could be addressed.

Policies concerning energy or regulation of toxic substances including pesticides and many types of industrial waste are part of the topic of environmental policy. This policy can be deliberately taken to influence human activities and thereby prevent undesirable effects on the biophysical environment and natural resources, as well as to make sure that changes in the environment do not have unacceptable effects on humans.

== Definition ==
One way is to describe environmental policy is that it comprises two major terms: environment and policy. Environment refers to the physical ecosystems, but can also take into consideration the social dimension (quality of life, health) and an economic dimension (resource management, biodiversity). Policy can be defined as a "course of action or principle adopted or proposed by a government, party, business or individual". Thus, environmental policy tends to focus on problems arising from human impact on the environment, which is important to human society by having a (negative) impact on human values. Such human values are often labeled as good health or the 'clean and green' environment. In practice, policy analysts provide a wide variety of types of information to the public decision-making process.

The concept of environmental policy was first used in the 1960s to recognise that all environmental problems, like the environment itself, are interconnected. Addressing environmental problems effectively (such as air, water, and soil pollution) requires looking at their connections and underlying and common sources, and how policies addressing particular problems can have spill-over effects on other problems and policies. "The environment" thus became a focus for public policy and environmental policy the term to refer to the way environmental issues were addressed more or less comprehensively.

Environmental issues typically addressed by environmental policy include (but are not limited to) air and water pollution, waste management, ecosystem management, biodiversity protection, the protection of natural resources, wildlife and endangered species, and the management of these natural resources for future generations. Relatively recently, environmental policy has also attended to the communication of environmental issues. Environmental policies often address issues in one of three dimensions of the environment: ecological (for instance, policies aimed at protecting a particular species or natural areas), resource (for instance, related to energy, land, water), and the human environment (the environment modified or shaped by humans, for instance, urban planning, pollution). Environmental policy-making is often highly fragmented, although environmental policy analysts have long pointed out the need for the development of more comprehensive and integrated environmental policies.

In contrast to environmental policy, ecological policy addresses issues that focus on achieving benefits (both monetary and non monetary) from the non human ecological world. Broadly included in ecological policy is natural resource management (fisheries, forestry, wildlife, range, biodiversity, and at-risk species). This specialized area of policy possesses its own distinctive features.

== History ==
As documented by environmental historians, human societies have always impacted their environment, often with adverse consequences for themselves and the rest of nature. Their failure to (timely) recognise and address these problems has been a contributing factor to their decline and collapse.

Concerns about pollution and its threat to humans as well as nature has provided major stimulus for the development of environmental policies. In 1863, in the United Kingdom, health problems arising from the release of harmful chemicals led to the adoption of the Alkali Act and the creation of the Alkali Inspectorate. In 1956, the Clean Air Act 1956 was adopted in the wake of London's Great Smog of 1952 that is believed to have killed 12,000 people. Concerns about the effects of pollution fuelled notably by the publication, in 1962, of Rachel Carson's Silent Spring, sparked the beginning of the modern environmental movement. It also marked the start of "the environment" becoming a concern of public policy, as pointed out by Caldwell in 1963. These growing concerns, as well as the growing publicity about environmental problems and accidents, forced governments to introduce or strengthen laws and policies aimed at enhancing environmental protection.

The Post-war era resulted in the 'Great Acceleration', which saw a dramatic increase in industrialization, agriculture, and consumption of resources leading to a new geological era of environmental deficit. The development of environmentalism in the United Kingdom emerged in this period following the great London smog of 1952 and the Torrey Canyon oil spill of 1967. This is reflected by the emergence of Green politics in the Western world beginning in the 1970s.

Earth Day founder Gaylord Nelson, then a U.S. Senator from Wisconsin, after witnessing the ravages of the 1969 massive oil spill in Santa Barbara, California, became famous for his environmental work. Administrator Ruckelshaus was confirmed by the Senate on December 2, 1970, which is the traditional date used as the birth of the United States Environmental Protection Agency (EPA). Five months earlier, in July 1970, President Nixon had signed Reorganization Plan No. 3 calling for the establishment of EPA. At the time, environmental policy was a bipartisan issue and the efforts of the United States of America made it an early environmental leader. During this period, legislation was passed to regulate pollutants that go into the air, water tables, and solid waste disposal. President Nixon signed the Clean Air Act in 1970.

In many countries, governments created environment ministries, departments or agencies, and appointed ministers of or for the environment. The world's first minister of the environment was the British Politician Peter Walker from the Conservative Party in 1970.

In the European Union, the very first Environmental Action Programme was adopted by national government representatives in July 1973 during the first meeting of the Council of Environmental Ministers. Since then an increasingly dense network of legislation has developed, which now extends to all areas of environmental protection including air pollution control, water protection and waste policy but also nature conservation and the control of chemicals, biotechnology and other industrial risks. EU environmental policy has thus become a core area of European politics.

Despite commonalities between countries in the development of environmental policies and institutions, they have also adopted different approaches in this area. In the 1970s, the field of Comparative Environmental Politics and Policy emerged to compare the environmental policies and institutions of countries aimed at explaining differences and similarities.

Although particular environmental problems like soil erosion, growing resource scarcity, air and water pollution increasingly became the subject of concern and government regulation in the 19th century, these were seen and addressed as separate issues. The shortcomings of this reactive and fragmented approach received growing recognition during the 1960s and early 1970s, the first wave of environmentalism. This was reflected in the creation, in many countries, of environmental agencies, policies and legislation with the aim of taking a more comprehensive and integrated approach to environmental issues. In 1972, the need for this was also recognised at the international level at the United Nations Conference on the Human Environment, which led to the creation of the United Nations Environment Programme. Notably, the 1972 United Nations Conference on the Human Environment in Stockholm marked the entry of environmental politics into the international agenda, giving rise to new environmental political thought and its incorporation into policymaking. Since then, environmentalism has taken shape as its own political ideology and has had numerous variations, from more radical theories like 'deep ecology' which seeks to prioritize environmental needs to more reformist ideologies which view environmental damage as an externality.

== Rationale ==
Growing environmental awareness and concern provided the main rationale for the adoption of environmental policies and institutions by governments. Environmental protection became a focus of public policy.

This rationale for environmental policy is broader than that provided by some interpretations based on economic theories. The rationale for governmental involvement in the environment is often attributed to market failure in the form of forces beyond the control of one person, including the free rider problem and the tragedy of the commons. An example of an externality is when a factory produces waste pollution which may be discharged into a river, ultimately contaminating water. The cost of such action is paid by society at large when they must clean the water before drinking it and is external to the costs of the polluter. The free rider problem occurs when the private marginal cost of taking action to protect the environment is greater than the private marginal benefit, but the social marginal cost is less than the social marginal benefit. The tragedy of the commons is the condition that, because no one person owns the commons, each individual has an incentive to utilize common resources as much as possible. Without governmental involvement, the commons is overused. Examples of tragedies of the commons are overfishing and overgrazing.

The "market failure" rationale for environmental policy has been criticised for its implicit assumptions about the drivers of human behaviour, which are considered to be rooted in the idea that societies are nothing but collections of self-interested "utility-maximising" individuals. As Elinor Ostrom has demonstrated, this is not supported by evidence on how societies actually make resource decisions. The market-failure theory also assumes that "markets" have, or should have precedence over governments in collective decision-making, which is an ideological position that was challenged by Karl Polanyi whose historical analysis shows how the idea of a self-regulating market was politically created. He added that "Such an institution could not exist for any length of time without annihilating the human and natural substance of society."

By contrast, ecological economists argue that economic policies should be developed within a theoretical framework that recognises the biophysical reality. The economic system is a sub-system of the biophysical environmental system on which humans and other species depend for their well-being and survival. The need for grounding environmental policy on ecological principles has also been recognised by many environmental policy analysts, sometimes under the label of ecological rationality and/or environmental integration. From this perspective, political, economic, and other systems, as well as policies, need to be "greened" to make them ecologically rational.

== Policy approaches ==
=== Instruments ===
In practice, governments have adopted a wide range of approaches to the development and implementation of environmental policies. To a large extent, differences in approaches have been influenced and shaped by the particular political, economic and social context of a country or polity (like the European Union or the United Nations). The differences in approaches, the reasons behind them, and their results have been the subject of research in the fields of comparative environmental politics and policy. But the study of problems and issues associated with environmental policy development has also been influenced by general public policy theories and analyses. Contributions on this front have been influenced by different academic disciplines, notably economics, public policy, and environmental studies, but also by political-ideological views, politics, and economic interests, among others through "think tanks". Thus, the design of environmental policy and the choice of policy instruments is always political and not just a matter determined by technical and efficiency considerations advanced by scientists, economists or other experts. As Majone has argued: "Policy instruments are seldom ideologically neutral" and "cannot be neatly separated from goals." The choice of policy instruments always occurs in a political context. Differences in ideological preferences of governments and political actors, and in national policy styles, have been argued to strongly influence a government's approach to policy design, including the choice of instruments.

Although many different policy instruments can be identified, and many ways of classifying them have been put forward, very broadly, a minimalist approach distinguishes three kinds or categories of policy instruments: regulation, economic instruments, and normative or "hortatory" approaches. These have also been referred to as "sticks, carrots and sermons". Vedung, based on Majone's classification of power, argues that the main difference underlying these categories is the degree of coercion (authoritative force) involved.

==== Regulation ====
Regulation has been a traditional and predominant approach to policymaking in many policy areas and countries. It relies foremost on adopting rules (often backed up by legislation), to prohibit, impose or circumscribe human behaviour and practices. In the environmental policy area, this includes, for instance, the imposition of limits or standards for air and water pollution, car emissions, the regulation or banning of the use of hazardous substances, the phasing out of ozone-depleting substances, waste disposal, and laws to protect endangered species and natural areas.

Regulation is often derogatorily referred to by detractors as a top-down, "command and control" approach as it leaves target groups with little if any control over the way(s) environmental activities or goals must be pursued. Since the 1980s, with the rise of neoliberalism in many countries and the associated redefinition of the role of the state (centred on the notion of governance rather than government), regulation has been touted as ineffective and inefficient, sparking a move toward deregulation and the adoption by many governments of "new" policy instruments, notably market instruments and voluntary agreements, also in the realm of environmental policy.

==== Economic instruments ====
Economic instruments involve the imposition or use of economic incentives, including (environmental) taxes, tax exemptions, fees, subsidies, and the creation of markets and rights for trading in substances, pollutants, resources, or activities, such as for SO_{2}, CO_{2} (carbon or greenhouse gas emissions), water, and tradeable fisheries quota. They are based on the assumption that behaviour and practices are foremost driven by rationality, self-interest and economic considerations and that these motivations can be harnessed for environmental purposes. Decision-making studies cast doubt on these premises. Often, decisions are reached based on irrational influences, unconscious biases, illogical assumptions, and the desire to avoid or create ambiguity and uncertainty.

Market-based policy instruments also have their supporters and detractors. Among the detractors, for example, some environmentalists contend that a more radical, overarching approach is needed than a set of specific initiatives, to deal with climate change. For example, energy efficiency measures may actually increase energy consumption in the absence of a cap on fossil fuel use, as people might drive more fuel-efficient cars. To combat this result, Aubrey Meyer calls for a 'framework-based market' of Contraction and Convergence. The Cap and Share and the Sky Trust are proposals based on the idea. In the case of corporations, it is assumed that such tools make it financially rewarding to engage in efficient environmental management that also improves business and organizational performance They also encourage businesses to become more transparent about their environmental performance by publishing data and reporting.

For economic instruments to function, some form(s) of regulation are needed that involve policy design, for instance, related to the choice and level of taxation, who pays, who qualifies for rights or permits, and the rules on which trading, and a "market" depend for their functioning. For example, the implementation of greener public purchasing programs relies on a combination of regulation and economic incentives.

==== Normative ("hortatory") instruments ====
Normative ("hortatory") instruments ("sermons") rely on persuasion and information. They include, among others, campaigns aimed at raising public awareness and enhancing knowledge of environmental problems, calls upon people to change their behaviour and practices (like taking up recycling, reducing waste, the use of water and energy, and using public transport), and voluntary agreements between governments and businesses. They share the aim of encouraging people to do "the right thing", to change their behaviour and practices, and to accept individual or group responsibility for addressing issues. Agreements between the government and private firms and commitments made by firms independent of government requirements are examples of voluntary environmental measures.

Environmental Impact Assessment is a tool that relies foremost on the gathering of knowledge and information about (potential) environmental effects. It originated in the United States but has been adopted in many countries to analyse and assess the potential impacts of projects. Usually undertaken by experts, it is based on the assumption that an objective assessment of effects is possible, and that the knowledge generated will persuade decision-makers to make changes to proposals to mitigate or prevent adverse environmental effects. How EIA rules and processes are designed and implemented depends on regulation and is influenced by the political context. Eccleston and March argue that although policymakers normally have access to reasonably accurate environmental information, political and economic factors are important and often lead to policy decisions that rank environmental priorities of secondary importance.

The effectiveness of hortatory instruments has also been under debate. Policies relying foremost on such instruments may amount to little more than symbolic policies, implying that governments have little or no intention to effectively address an issue while creating the impression of taking it seriously. Such policies rely more on rhetoric than action. In the environmental realm, sustainable development policies or strategies are often used for this purpose if these are not translated into clear and specific objectives, timeframes and measures. Yet, hortatory policy instruments are often preferred by governments and other actors as they are seen as a way of recognising and sharing collective responsibility, possibly avoiding the need for regulation and/or economic instruments. They are thus often used as a first step towards addressing environmental problems. However, these tools are often combined with some form of legislation and regulation, for instance, in the case of labelling of consumer products (product information), waste disposal and recycling.

=== Comparison of instruments ===
There has been much debate about the relative merits of the various kinds of policy instruments. Market instruments are often held up and used as a more efficient and cost-effective, alternative to regulation. Yet, many analysts have pointed out that regulation, economic incentives, "market" instruments, and environmental taxation and subsidies can achieve the same results. For instance, as Kemp and Pontoglio argue, policy instruments cannot be usefully ranked with regard to their effects on eco-innovation, "the often expressed view that market-based approaches such as pollution taxes and emission trading systems are better for promoting eco-innovation is not brought out by the case study literature or by survey analysis", and there is actually more evidence that regulations stimulate radical innovation more than market-based instruments. It has also been argued that If the government can anticipate new technology or is able to react to it optimally, regulatory policies by virtue of administered prices (taxes) and policies by setting quantities (issuing tradable permits) are (almost) equivalent. More generally, the performance of economic instruments in dealing with environmental problems has been a mixed bag, referred to by Hahn as "not very impressive", and has led Tietenberg to conclude that they are "no panacea".

Different instruments are sometimes combined in a policy mix to address a particular environmental problem. Since environmental issues have many aspects, several policy instruments may be required to adequately address each one. Ideally, government policies are carefully formulated so that the individual measures do not undermine one another or create a rigid and cost-ineffective framework. Overlapping policies result in unnecessary administrative costs, increasing the cost of implementation. To help governments realize their policy goals, the OECD Environment Directorate, for example, collects data on the efficiency and consequences of environmental policies implemented by the national governments. Their website provides a database detailing countries' experiences with their environmental policies. The United Nations Economic Commission for Europe, through UNECE, and the OECD's Environmental Performance Reviews, evaluate progress made by its member countries in improving their environmental policies.

However, although regulation, taxation and market instruments can be equally (in-) effective, they may differ significantly in the allocation and distribution of (potential) costs and benefits, with the allocation of tradeable ("property") rights potentially generating significant profits to those who receive such rights. They are, therefore, generally much preferred by affected resource users and industries, which explains their popularity since the rise of neoliberalism. This has led analysts to point out that there are many other important aspects to the choice of policy instruments than their efficiency and cost-effectiveness, such as distributional, ethical and political aspects, and their appropriateness for addressing environmental problems.

== Policy analysis ==
How environmental policies are made, how effective they are, and how they can or should be improved, has become the subject of considerable research and debate. In the academic realm, these questions are commonly addressed under the label of environmental policy analysis.

Environmental policy analysis is a broad field comprising different approaches to explaining and developing environmental policy. The first type has been referred to in the policy literature as the analysis of policy and the second as the analysis for policy. Many approaches are derived from the broader field of public policy analysis which emerged as a scientific enterprise after WWII. While policy analysis as a decision-making tool continued to be applied in the business sector, the study of public policy, defined broadly as "What governments do, why they do it, and what difference it makes, became an important strand in political science. This variety, which has been classified into analycentric, policy process, and meta-policy categories, has also manifested itself in the area of environmental policy analysis which developed since the 1960s.

=== The analycentric or rational approach ===
The analycentric approach to environmental policy analysis, which focuses on particular issues and uses mostly quantitative methods to identify "optimal" (cost-effective or efficient) solutions, has been the prevalent way to address environmental problems, both by governments and businesses. It is also often depicted as the rational or scientific approach to and for policy development. While scientific analyses and (preferably) quantitative data provide knowledge of the more immediate sources or causes of environmental problems, such as forms of pollution and climate change, policy prescriptions are based on setting goals, objectives and targets and the identification of the most cost-effective and efficient means by assessing alternative options. Technological innovation, more efficient management, and economic instruments such as cost-benefit analysis, environmental taxes, and tradeable permit schemes (market creation) have been among the preferred means in this approach.

The analycentric or rational approach has been critiqued on various grounds. First, it assumes that there is adequate knowledge and agreement on the causes of problems and the goals to be achieved. Second, the approach (for policy) ignores the way policies are developed in (political) practice. Third, the preferred means are often based on questionable assumptions notably about human behaviour. Many of the limitations of the rational approach were already acknowledged by an early proponent, Herbert Simon, who argued that "limited rationality" provided a more realistic basis for decision-making. This view has also been expressed by advocates of more comprehensive and integrated environmental policy development, who argued that looking at problems in isolation (on a one-by-one basis) ignores the linkages between environmental problems and their causes. In the late 1980s, "green planning" and the adoption of sustainable development strategies, in particular, received support in academic circles and among many governments as rational, goal-based policy approaches aimed at overcoming the limitations of the fragmented analycentric approach.

=== The policy process approach ===
The policy process approach emphasises the role and importance of politics and power in policy development. It aims foremost at better understanding how policies are made and put into practice. It commonly involves identifying a variable number of steps, including problem definition and agenda setting, the formulation and selection of policy options, implementation, and evaluation. These are conceived as being parts of a policy cycle, as existing policies are reviewed and changed for political reasons and/or because they are deemed to be unsatisfactory. The various stages have become the focus of much research, generating insights into why and how policies have been developed and implemented, with variable outcomes and effectiveness. These studies show that policy development is more about the role of and interplay between conflicting interests than the result of rational analysis and finding and adopting (optimal) solutions to problems. One of the main schools of thought on this front is that of incrementalism, which argues that policy change often occurs in small steps that accommodate conflicting interests.

Policy process analysis has also been applied to environmental policy in its different stages. It has been used, for instance, to clarify why environmental issues have had difficulty reaching or staying on the public and political agendas. More recently, research has revealed the role and power of businesses, notably the oil industry, in downplaying the risks associated with climate change or "climate change denial." "Think tanks" and the media have been used to sow scepticism about the science behind environmental and other problems, to redefine issues, and to avert policies that threaten the interests of businesses.

Policy process analyses also include studies of the variety of actors and their influence on government decision-making. Although pluralism, the idea that not one group dominates all decision-making in modern societies, has long been the prevailing school of thought in political science, it has been contested by elite theories that assign predominant power to elites in different areas or sectors of decision-making. To what extent environmental groups have had influence on government decisions and policies continues to be a subject of debate. Some argue that Non-Governmental organizations have the greatest influence on environmental policies. These days, many countries are facing huge environmental, social, and economic impacts of rapid population growth, development, and natural resource constraints. As NGOs try to help countries to tackle these issues more successfully, a lack of understanding about their role in civil society and the public perception that the government alone is responsible for the well-being of its citizens and residents makes NGOs tasks more difficult to achieve. NGOs such as Greenpeace and World Wildlife Fund can help tackling issues by conducting research to facilitate policy development, building institutional capacity, and facilitating independent dialogue with civil society to help people live more sustainable lifestyles. The need for a legal framework to recognize NGOs and enable them to access more diverse funding sources, high-level support/endorsement from local figureheads, and engaging NGOs in policy development and implementation is more important as environmental issues continue to increase.

It has been argued that notwithstanding Reagan's efforts to undo environmental regulation in the US, the effects have been limited as environmental interests were already strongly entrenched. Under President Trump, again, many environmental regulations have been dismantled or were scheduled to be rolled back. Other research suggests that many environmental policies adopted by governments are designed to be weak and largely ineffective as business interests use their power to influence or even shape these policies, also at the international level.

International organizations have also made great impacts on environmental policies by creating programmes such as the United Nations Environment Programme and hosting conferences such as the United Nations Earth Summit to address environmental issues. UNEP is the leading global environmental authority tasked with policy guidance for environmental programs. The UNEP monitors environmental aspects, such as waste management, energy use, greenhouse gas inventory, and water use to promote environmental sustainability and address environmental issues.

The role of science and scientists in policy environmental policy development has been another focus of research. Scientists have been instrumental in discovering many environmental problems, from the damaging effects of the use of pesticides, the depletion of the ozone layer, the greenhouse effect, and all kinds of pollution, among others. In this respect, they have often provided legitimacy and support to the raising of concerns by the environmental movement, although they have often been reluctant to get involved in environmental activism out of fear of compromising their scientific credibility. Nonetheless, scientists have played a significant role pushing environmental issues onto the international agenda, together with international ENGOs, in what have been referred to as "epistemic communities." However, to what extent science can be "value-free" has been a subject of debate. Science and scientists always operate in a political-economic context that circumscribes their role, research and its effects. This raises the question of scientific integrity, especially when scientists are paid to serve commercial and political interests.

=== The meta-policy approach ===
Meta-policy research focuses on the ways policy development is influenced or shaped by contextual factors, including political institutions and systems, socio-cultural patterns, economic systems, knowledge frameworks, discourses, and the changes therein. The latter may involve deliberate changes to the formal and non-formal institutions through which policy analysis, development, decision-making, and implementation occur, such as the introduction of rules for cost-benefit analysis, risk analysis, consultation and accountability requirements, and organisational change.

How environmental problems are interpreted and defined directly affects the development of environmental policies, at all stages of the policy cycle, from problem recognition, and the formulation of policy options, to decision-making, implementation and policy evaluation. However, much (meta-policy) research has been undertaken on what influences or shapes these views and interpretations. For instance, there is a large body of research that looks at whether societies have moved or are moving towards "post-materialist" values, or to a New Environmental Paradigm. More broadly, the link between dominant worldviews and the way the environment is treated has been a focus of much debate. The rise and growing support for the environmental movement is often seen as a driver towards "greener" societies. If such socio-cultural trends hold, this is expected to lead governments to adopt stronger environmental policies.

Other meta-policy research focuses on the different "environmental discourses" and how they compete for dominance in societies and worldwide. The power to influence or shape people's view of the world has been referred to as "cognitive power". The role of intellectuals, opinion leaders, and the media in shaping and advancing the dominant views and ideologies in societies has been an important focus of Marxist and critical theory that has also influenced the analysis of environmental policy formation. Ownership and control of the media play an important role in the formation of public opinion on environmental issues.

Other meta-policy research relevant to the development of environmental policy focuses on institutional and systemic factors. For instance, the role of environmental institutions and their capacity and power within the broader systems of government is found to be an important factor in advancing or constraining environmental policy. More broadly, the question of whether capitalism is compatible or not with long-term environmental protection has been a subject of debate. As, after the collapse of the Soviet Union and the introduction of capitalism in China, capitalism became a globally dominant system, this question has become even more important to the future development of environmental policy at the national and international levels. As many analysts of global environmental politics have pointed out, the institutions for developing effective environmental policy at that level are weak and rather ineffective, as demonstrated by accounts of continuing environmental deterioration.

== Democratic policy ==
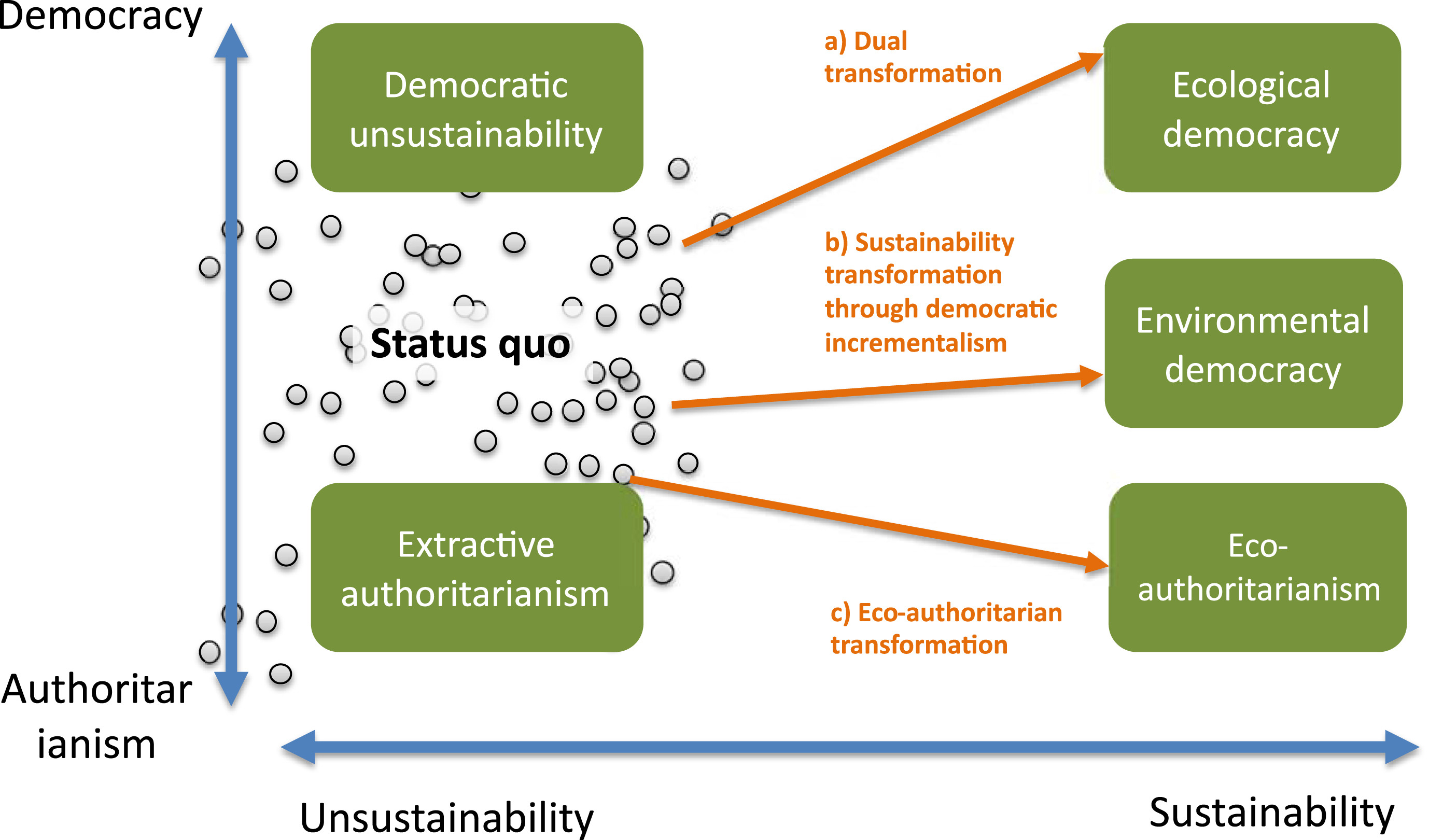
Existing policies can be placed on a spectrum in between the ideal of democracy and its opposite, authoritarianism. The environmental policies have different pathways for sustainability transformations.

Countries with the most primary (old-growth) forest loss

Overall, 20% of the Amazon rainforest—the world's largest—has been "transformed" (deforested) and another 6% has been "highly degraded", causing Amazon Watch to warn that the Amazonia is in the midst of a tipping point crisis.

There are long-standing debates in research and policy about whether democratic practices are capable of fostering timely, large-scale transformations towards sustainability. A few scholars argue that large-scale transformation to sustainability will require the rollback of democratic safeguards or the imposition of technocratic or authoritarian rule. However, a majority of researchers on the democracy-environment nexus argue that democratization and sustainability transformation are mutually supportive.

The roles of democracy and democratic institutions in advancing environmental policy and, in particular, climate policy are mixed, as evidenced by the variation in the environmental progress of different democratic governments. From a theoretical perspective, democratic procedures can effect meaningful reform if public support for these reforms exists, especially when compared with autocratic regimes, as the set of incentives for policymakers to legislate toward these ends in a system deriving legitimacy from the consent of the governed is substantive; for instance, given political responsiveness as a result of electoral accountability, policymakers in democratic governments have reason to consider a wide view of the public interest that incorporates the varied positions of their constituents and work to efficiently create change. On such a view, democracies will likely consider the consequential impacts to most, if not all constituents, caused by climate change. Factors like regime stability and ruler or governing official interests, too, seem better aligned for progress in a democracy; civil unrest is less likely in a state perceived as legitimate, as is graft, both of which appear likely to inhibit climate action.

In contrast, empirical evidence does show inconsistencies in the ways in which democracies address environmental problems. Though the reason for this variation is largely unclear, a number of features of democratic state organization appear to contribute to observed failures to act on climate change, among other environmental issues. Leaders may, in practice, not be motivated by a theoretical public good, but instead expend resources on resolving those policy challenges which are most visible to their electorate. Given the largely intangible nature of climate change as a problem – one that is gradual, invisible, and global – the political opportunity cost of focusing on this challenge or other less visible environmental issues may be high for electorally accountable democratic leaders.

Economic interests and outside influences may also limit the ability of democratic actors to drive meaningful environmental change. In developed democracies, businesses and other groups with economic motivations often hold considerable lobbying power and, therefore, have the ability to forestall climate or environmental progress, which are often unaligned with these groups' financial interests. In developing democracies, environmental reforms are often seen as lesser priorities, given the need for addressing more proximate public concerns, including poverty, infrastructure, and general economic development. Financial incentive can also play a role in preventing the passage of environmental policy outside of the legal realm; some evidence suggests that corruption, present in some form in a number of democratic institutions globally, erodes regulatory ability and public trust in state institutions, reducing the ability of democracies to effectively mitigate carbon emissions and other sources of pollution.

In addition, the problem of popular disinterest in advancing environmental policy presents challenges for the prospects of democratic institutions' ability to drive environmental progress. Despite growing public understanding of the threat posed by climate change, the last decade has seen considerable opposition to pro-environmental policies across broad coalitions and around the globe. Populist movements in Western democracies over the last several years, in particular, have taken positions that actively oppose such policies, and analyses of deliberative modes of participatory democracy have shown results that mirror the interests of those participating and do not necessarily tend towards a more favorable view of environmental or climate action. As redress to these potential shortcomings, means of reforming democratic processes, both theoretical and pragmatic, to correct for what may be short-sighted political interests have been suggested, though these reforms may reduce democratic choice or participation.

Questions of environmental justice, too, may be unanswered by democratic decision-making processes. Not only are those minority groups without meaningful representation in either single-member districts or majority-rule electorates disadvantaged in the realm of political interests, but these same groups are often those most impacted by the effects of climate change and other environmental problems. In addition, recent literature around non-human representation has investigated the ways in which the interests of affected conscious agents, which are definitionally uninvolved in the political decisions of human society, are consistently underrepresented; solutions accounting for this disparity often appeal to reforms that would reduce democratic choice from a traditional perspective, including by giving biological experts greater say in policymaking, though even their ability to determine the interests of non-humans is uncertain. On a global scale, those most impacted by the effects of climate change may have little say in determining policies that would curb emissions or otherwise work to adapt to climate outcomes. Not only do individuals only have the ability to determine climate policy in their own state, but those states that emit the least atmospheric carbon are often most vulnerable to the impacts of climate change, while those that emit the most are often least vulnerable, a discrepancy unaccounted for by democratic processes.

Effectively responding to global warming necessitates some form of international environmental governance to achieve shared targets related to energy consumption and environmental usage. Climate change complicates political ideology and practice, affecting conceptions of responsibility for future societies as well as economic systems. Material inequality between nations make technological solutions insufficient for climate change mitigation. Rather, political solutions can navigate the particularities of various facets of environmental crisis. Climate change mitigation strategies can be at odds with democratic priorities of prosperity, progress, and state sovereignty, and instead underscore a collective relationship with the environment.

The international political community in some countries is presently based on liberal principles that prioritize individual freedoms and capitalist systems that make quick and ambitious climate responses difficult. Interest-group liberalism is guided by individual human priorities. Groups unable to voice their self-interest, such as minorities without suffrage, or non-humans, are not included in the political compromise. Addressing environmental crises can be impeded when citizens of liberal democracies do not see environmental problems as impacting their lives, or when they lack the education to evaluate the importance of the problem. The human benefits from environmental exploitation and protection compete. Considering the implications of ecological degradation for future human generations can give environmental concerns a basis in anthropocentric liberal democratic politics.

William Ophuls posits that liberal democracies are unfit to address environmental problems, and that the prioritization of these challenges would involve a transition to more authoritarian forms of government. Others counter this by pointing to the past successes of environmental reform movements to improve water and air quality in liberal societies. In practice, environmentalism can improve democracy rather than necessitate its end, by expanding democratic participation and promoting political innovations.

The tensions between liberal democracy and environmental goals raise questions about the possible limitations of democracy (or at least democracy as we know it): in its responsiveness to subtle but large-scale problems, its ability to work from a holistic societal perspective, its aptness in coping with environmental crisis relative to other forms of government. Democracies do not have the provisions to make environmental reforms that are not mandated by voters, and many voters lack incentives or desire to demand policies that could compromise immediate prosperity. The question arises as to whether the foundation of politics is morality or practicality. A scheme that conceives of and values the environment beyond its human utility, an environmental ethics, could be crucial for democracies to respond to climate change.

Opinion polls in different countries tend to show majority views that the government is doing too little to protect the environment.

In political theory, deliberative democracy has been discussed as a political model more compatible with environmental goals. Deliberative democracy is a system in which informed political equals weigh values, information, and expertise, and debate priorities to make decisions, as opposed to a democracy based on interest aggregation. This definition of democracy emphasizes informed discussion among citizens in the decision making process, and encourages decisions to benefit the common good rather than individual interests. Amy Gutmann and Dennis Thompson claimed that reason prevails over self-interest in deliberative democracy, making it a more just system. The broad perspective that this discursive model encourages could lead to a stronger engagement with environmental concerns.

This can be explained more exhaustively with the concept of grass-roots democracy. Grass-roots democracy is an approach in which ordinary citizens are in charge of politics, in opposition to 'larger organizations and wealthy individuals with concentrated vested interests in particular policies'.

== Evaluation ==
Ultimately, the environmental effectiveness of policies is measured by the extent to which they reduce or resolve environmental problems (ecological destruction and degradation, resource degradation and depletion, and adverse effects on humans by environmental modification, including by urban development and pollution). Whether environmental policies have addressed environmental problems more or less effectively remains a topic of debate. On the one hand, some take a very positive and optimistic view, arguing that, on many fronts, the environmental situation, especially as it affects humans, has improved. On the other hand, many scientists and scientific reports paint a bleak picture of where the world is going, based on deteriorating environmental indicators linked to global heating, declining biodiversity, pollution trends (including of new forms of pollution such as the spread of plastic nanoparticles), and ongoing resource degradation and decline (such as water and agricultural land).

=== Difficulties ===
Differences in approaches to environmental policy development and design, including the selection of policy instruments, linked to different historical, political-economic and socio-cultural contexts, and the inevitable role and influence of different cognitive and ideological frameworks in the analysis and design of policies, all make that evaluating environmental policies is also a complex and controversial matter.

As many policy analysts have pointed out, judging the merits of policies goes beyond an assessment of the efficiency and cost-effectiveness of the policy instruments used. In the realm of public policy, policy evaluation is a topic that is seen as much more encompassing and complex. Apart from efficiency and cost-effectiveness, many other important aspects of policy and criteria for evaluating them have been identified and discussed, including their knowledge (science) basis, their goals and objectives, ethical issues, distributional effects, and process and legitimacy. Although efforts have been made to put evaluation on its own (trans-) disciplinary footing as a systematic and independent stage in the policy process, either before the adoption of policies (ex-ante evaluation) or after their implementation (ex-post evaluation) this remains fraught with problems. In practice, systematic evaluation remains a largely neglected aspect or stage of policymaking, in large part, because of the political nature and sensitivity of evaluating government's policies.

The difficulties of policy evaluation also apply to environmental policies. Also there, policy evaluation is often approached in simple terms based on the extent to which the stated goals of a policy have been achieved or not ("success or failure"). However, as many environmental policy analysts have pointed out, many other aspects of environmental policy are important. These include the goals and objectives of the policies (which may be deemed too vague, inadequate, poorly or wrongly targeted), their distributional effects (whether they contribute to or reduce environmental and social injustice), the kind of instruments used (for instance, their ethical and political dimensions), the processes by which policies have been developed (public participation and deliberation), and the extent to which they are institutionally supported.

=== Policy integration ===
The concept of policy integration has been discussed since the 1980s under various terms, such as policy mainstreaming, policy coordination, and holistic governance. In the environmental field, it is often called environmental policy integration. The main idea is that policies in one area (or domain) should consider their effects on other areas. If this is not done properly then policies coming from different domains or organizations could interfere with each other. Policy integration can apply to various aspects, such as policy goals, procedures, tools, and outcomes.

Many environmental thinkers and policy analysts have pointed out that addressing environmental problems effectively requires an integrated approach. As the environment is an integrated whole or system, environmental policies need to take account of the interactions within that system and the effects of human actions and interventions not just on a problem in isolation, but also their (potential) effects of other problems. More often than not, fragmented policies and "solutions", for instance, to combat pollution, lead to the displacement of environmental problems or the generation of new ones. The interconnectedness of the environmental challenge, it has been said, requires an approach that is "ecological rational" and environmentally effective.

Environmental integration, in broad terms, is "the integration of environmental considerations into all areas of human thinking, behaviour and practices that (potentially) affect the environment." This involves, among others, the development and adoption of an overarching view of the environment, an overarching policy to guide the "greening" of policies, and an institutional framework that gives "teeth" to environmental integration.

In academic and government circles (notably the EU), much of the focus has been on environmental policy integration (EPI), the process of integrating environmental objectives into non-environmental policy areas, such as energy, agriculture and transport, rather than leaving them to be pursued solely through "purely" environmental policies. This is often particularly challenging because of the need to reconcile global objectives and international rules with domestic needs and laws. EPI is widely recognised as one of the key elements of sustainable development, and it was adopted as a formal requirement by the EU. More recently, the notion of "climate policy integration", also denoted as "mainstreaming", has been applied to indicate the integration of climate considerations (both mitigation and adaptation) into the broader (often economically focused) activities of government.

Although, in the late 1980s and early 1990s, many governments began to adopt a more comprehensive approach to environmental issues, notably in the form of National Sustainable Development Strategies and "Green Planning", these efforts were largely abandoned during the 1990s due to the rise to prominence of neoliberal thinking, policies and reforms. This development led to the return of the fragmented and reactive approach to environmental problems with an emphasis on climate change and the use of "market-based" instruments.

=== Comparative environment policy and politics ===
The field of comparative environment policy and politics aims to explain the differences in performance related to, among others, differences in political systems, institutions, policy styles and cultures. However, the environmental performance of governments remains commonly based on achievements in a range of environmental problems and policy outputs, as measured by separate indicators like CO_{2} emissions, different forms of air pollution, water quality indicators, and biological diversity (individual species). These assessments are often used as a basis for ranking the environmental performance of countries, with some characterised as leaders and others as laggards. However, such rankings have been treated with scepticism, not only on methodological grounds but especially because they mean little in terms of the extent to which governments take environmental integration seriously. While it has been noted that, at different stages, some countries have been leaders in some areas of environmental integration, these efforts have not been sustained over time.

== Possible improvements ==
Reflecting the diversity of approaches to environmental policy development, influenced by contextual factors, policy perspectives, and political-ideological views, among others, there are also different views on how environmental policy could or should be improved. The three most common standpoints have been referred to as incrementalism ("tinkering"), democratisation, and systemic change.

Incrementalism has been deemed to be the most common (standard) way governments change their policies with the stated aim of improving them. Propagated in particular by Charles Lindblom based on his view of American political reality, he argued that changing policies in small steps is not only the most common way policies are developed, but also the best way, as it avoids making big errors that could result from a "rational-comprehensive" approach. Also, over time, a series of small changes may add up and bring about significant and big change. Although incrementalism has been critiqued for its underlying assumptions and conservative implications ("tinkering"), and also for its failure to come to grips with environmental problems, it is a very recognisable approach to policy "improvement" in many countries.

As incrementalism does not question the political-economic status quo, its suggestions for policy improvement are foremost of a managerial or technological kind. Tinkering with policy and management tools, and technological innovation, are seen as the main and most desirable ("win-win") ways to address environmental (and other) problems. This "technocentric" approach, which is seen as politically neutral, has been a preferred and dominant approach to "solving" environmental problems from the beginning of the environmental era, advocated by governments, businesses, and many environmentalists. The managerial approach also involves training "environmental practitioners" and policy analysts. Given the growing need for trained environmental practitioners, graduate schools throughout the world offer specialized professional degrees in environmental policy studies. While there is not a standard curriculum, students typically take classes in policy analysis, environmental science, environmental law and politics, ecology, energy, and natural resource management. Graduates of these programs are employed by governments, international organizations, private sector, think tanks, advocacy organizations, and universities.

Much of the research and innovation sponsored by governments, businesses and international organisations under the heading of "transition management" is aimed at the gradual (incremental) development of new "transformative" technologies, for instance, in areas like energy, transport and agriculture. An example is the European environmental research and innovation policy, which aims at defining and implementing a transformative agenda to greening the economy and society as a whole so as to achieve "truly" sustainable development. The EU strategies, actions and programmes promote more and better research and innovation for building a resource-efficient, climate-resilient society and thriving economy which are meant to be in sync with the natural environment. Research and innovation in Europe are financially supported by the programme Horizon 2020, which is also open to participation worldwide. Yet, the "transition management" approach to sustainability has been critiqued for its a-political, technocratic and elitist nature. Also, Bucchi argues that the traditional technocentric approach no longer suffices as science has increasingly been commercialised and politicised and lost much of its image of neutrality that it enjoyed with the public at large.

In line with the policy process perspective, many environmental advocates and analysts support improving the opportunities for public participation and input in the policy process, as well as increasing transparency. The policy design literature aims to pull together insights gained from studies of the various stages of the policy cycle to design more effective policies, to better consider the tools, rules and assumptions on which they are based, the groups at which they are targeted, contextual factors, as well as the nature (complexity) of the problem. Enhancing public input and participation is argued to have the potential to improve all stages of the policy cycle, including problem definition, decision-making, policy implementation, and evaluation. UNFCCC research shows that climate-related projects and policies that involve women are more effective. Policies, projects and investments without meaningful participation by women are less effective and often increase existing gender inequalities. Women found climate solutions that cross political or ethnic boundaries have been particularly important in regions where entire ecosystems are under threat, e.g. small island states, the Arctic and the Amazon and in areas where people's livelihoods depend on natural resources e.g. fishing, farming and forestry. However, the degree and kind of opportunities provided for public input and deliberation are seen as a key factor, both for improving the effectiveness of policies and for enhancing their support basis and legitimacy. Enhancing democracy, for instance, by adopting forms of "discursive designs" and other forms of "reflexive" deliberative democracy, aims to create a level playing field on which citizens' representatives have a more equal chance to partake in shaping policy. Relatively recently, "citizens' assemblies" have been used in a range of countries to address controversial topics, including climate change policy. However, as these are temporary and advisory bodies, governments are not bound by their recommendations.

Over time, many governments have introduced laws to provide public access to government-held information, for instance, by the adoption of Freedom of Information legislation. Although a growing number of governments have adopted such legislation, a report by Privacy International notes that in many countries much work remains to be done on the implementation front and the creation of a culture, "leaving access largely unfulfilled."

A third approach to improving environmental policy is based on the view that meaningful progress on resolving environmental problems requires fundamental or systemic change, in particular of the prevailing socio-cultural, political and economic systems. Three categories of factors are commonly identified: cognitive factors (the way(s) environmental problems have been interpreted (cognitive factors), linked to dominant belief and value systems; political factors (the nature of the prevailing political systems); and the nature of the prevailing economic systems. These three types of factors are not mutually exclusive, and analysts often combine them to provide more comprehensive explanations.

That the way environmental problems predominantly are interpreted is a fundamental obstacle to addressing the environmental challenge effectively, has been pointed out already from the earliest stages of the rise of environmental awareness and thinking. Many early environmental thinkers argued that environmental problems are interrelated, finding their roots in the interconnectedness of the environment itself and the failure of human societies to recognise that reality and to heed this in their behaviour and practices. These thinkers point out the need to take a "holistic", ecosystems or integrated approach to the management of the environment and the use of resources. Often, it is argued that such an approach was common to indigenous societies, but that this got pushed aside and lost with the rise of "modernity" and rational-analytic (scientific) thinking. In modern societies, nature has come to be seen, analysed and manipulated as a machine in the service of human ends.

But as the way the environmental challenge is interpreted is closely linked to the dominant socio-cultural (value) system, the latter is also said to need fundamental change. There is a large body of literature on the role and importance of the dominant values in societies and the (possible) changes therein, among others linked to economic development, urbanisation and globalisation. On the one hand, analysts have identified the rise of individualism, materialism, consumerism, and the decline of community values in modern societies and cultures. On the other hand, some analysts, notably based on Ronald Inglehart's work, argue that, with rising standards of living, comes a shift in societies, facilitated by generational change, from material to "post-material" values, including self-actualisation, belonging, and aesthetics. However, it is debatable to what extent this shift represents a move towards environmental values becoming dominant and whether the level of support for the environment depends on a high standard of living. Others, notably inspired by Riley Dunlap's research, more directly explore whether the presently dominant paradigm is being replaced by what is referred to as the "New Environmental Paradigm". As yet, however, the findings of this research are inconclusive, although there is evidence that environmental concern and support have grown globally.

Whether and how the dominant value systems and views on the environment can be purposefully changed by concerted social action aimed at assigning greater priority remains a matter of debate and uncertainty. On the one hand, the environmental movement has been touted as a "vanguard" in shifting the dominant paradigm. On the other hand, the effectiveness of the environmental movement in bringing about fundamental value change can and has been drawn into doubt. One reason is that the environmental movement itself is very diverse in views on the kind of value change(s) required, ranging from technocentric to deep ecological stances. To what extent green parties have been effective in changing dominant value patterns or are themselves subject to being co-opted by dominant values and interests is also subject to debate. To a large extent, as many analysts have pointed out, the ability to shape the dominant values and public views on the environment depends on the relative (cognitive) power held and exercised by groups, notably through control over the media and other institutions such as education, universities, think tanks, and the social media.

The importance of the nature of political systems for the development of environmental (and other) policies has been the subject of much research, including in the field of Comparative Environmental Policy. Analysts have pointed out a broad range of factors that stand in the way of environmental issues being adequately recognised and/or assigned political priority, including the role, privileged access, power and influence, and even dominance of (non-environmental) interest groups, bureaucratic thinking and interests, the lack of openness and transparency, (very) limited opportunities for public input and participation, and the short political horizon linked to electoral cycles. Many of these factors are not confined to liberal-democratic political systems but also play a role, perhaps even more so, in authoritarian political systems.

These political obstacles have generally led to a relative weakness in the power of government institutions (organisations and rules) advocating for environmental interests compared to non-environmental institutions and the circumscription of the power, role and influence of societal environmental groups, including green parties, if not their co-optation by the dominant powers and vested interests. This also affects the "environmental capacity" of political systems, severely limiting efforts to develop more comprehensive and integrated approaches to the environmental challenge.

Other analysts emphasise the importance of economic systems, notably capitalism, as a fundamental obstacle to developing and adopting effective environmental policies. Some take the view that capitalism is fundamentally incompatible with long-term environmental protection, notably because of its inherent growth imperative. Others recognise this imperative as a problem but argue that it is possible to reform capitalism in a way that does not require growth, or that enables "green growth" based on the recognition of environmental limits. Many have pointed out that socialist economic systems have had even worse environmental records than capitalist systems, implying that socialism is no better alternative for the environment even apart from other considerations. However, this view is contested by those who argue that socialism as an economic system does not necessarily require an authoritarian system and that there is scope for creating democratic socialist systems that assign greater priority to collective interests, including environmental protection.

These cognitive, social, political and economic factors are often referred to as systemic, meaning that overcoming these obstacles requires systemic, fundamental or transformative change, notably of the systems that are the sources and drivers of environmental pressures and problems, including the political and economic systems, and sectors like agriculture, energy, and transport. Increasingly, the tweaking of environmental and other policies is seen as inadequate, and there is growing recognition of the need for "transformative change". However, the interrelatedness of these systems raises questions about whether and/or how such transformative change can be achieved, which has led a growing number of environmental analysts, including scientists, to serious doubts and pessimism, although others argue that it remains possible for societies to do so.

== Examples ==
Brazil, Russia, India, and China (known as the "BRIC" nations) are rapidly industrializing, and are increasingly responsible for global carbon emissions and the associated climate change. Other forms of environmental degradation have also accompanied the economic growth in these nations. Environmental degradation tends to motivate action more than the threat of global warming does, since air and water pollution cause immediate health problems, and because pollutants can damage natural resources, hampering economic potential.

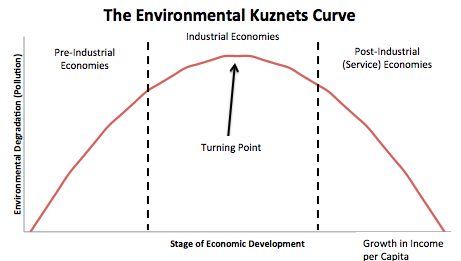
The Kuznets curve is a hypothetical curve representing the trajectory of environmental degradation in developing nations as a function of per capita income.

With rising incomes, environmental degradation tends to decrease in industrializing nations, as depicted in the Environmental Kuznets Curve (described in a section of the Kuznets Curve article). Citizens demand better air and water quality, and technology becomes more efficient and clean when incomes increase. The level of income per capita needed to reverse the trend of environmental degradation in industrializing nations varies with the environmental impact indicator. More developed nations can facilitate eco-friendly transitions in emerging economies by investing in the development of clean technologies.

Laws implemented in response to environmental concerns vary by nation (see List of environmental laws by country).

=== China ===
China's environmental ills include acid rain, severe smog, and a reliance on coal-burning for energy. China has instated environmental policies since the 1970s, and has one of the most extensive environmental conservation programs on paper. However, regulation and enforcement by the central government in Beijing are weak, so solutions are decentralized. Wealthier provinces are far more effective in their preservation and sustainable development efforts than poorer regions. China therefore provides an example of the consequences of environmental damage falling disproportionately on the poor. NGOs, the media, and the international community have all contributed to China's response to environmental problems.

For history, laws, and policies, see Environmental policy in China.

=== India ===
In 1976, the Constitution of India was amended to reflect environmental priorities, motivated in part by the potential threat of natural resource depletion to economic growth:

"The State shall endeavour to protect and improve the environment and to safeguard the forests and wildlife." (Art. 48A)

"It shall be the duty of every citizen of India [...] to protect and improve the natural environment including forests, lakes, rivers and wildlife, and to have compassion for living creatures." (Art. 51A)

However, in India, as in China, the implementation of written environmental policies, laws, and amendments has proven challenging. Official legislation by the central government (see a partial list at Environmental policy of the Government of India) is often more symbolic than practical. The Ministry of Environment and Forests was established in 1985, but corruption within bureaucratic agencies, namely the influence of wealthy industry leaders, limited any attempts at enforcement of the policies put in place. Under the leadership of Prime Minister Narendra Modi, the Ministry was renamed to the "Ministry of Environment, Forests, and Climate Change" in 2014 with its allotted budget being decreased by 50%.

=== Brazil ===
In 1985, the Brazilian government established the Ministry of Environment and Climate Change (Brazil) (MMA). The departments of this ministry deal with climate change, the quality of the environment, biodiversity and forests, sustainable urban and rural development, forests and biodiversity, and environmental citizenship. Other organisations are also responsible for the implementation of environmental policies, such as IBAMA, to help protect the natural environment. Deforestation in Brazil hit its highest level in over 15 years in 2021 under Jair Bolsonaro. However, Since Lula assumed office in 2023 deforestation rates halved compared to 2022. Lula has also promised to restore the Amazon rainforest and chase down climate criminals during his speech at climate summit COP27 in 2022.

== See also ==
- Environmental justice
- Environmental governance
- Environmental politics
- Normative science
- Policy advocacy
- Environmental history
