= Environmental policy of the European Union =

Environment protection policy

Development of CO_{2} emissions in the European Union

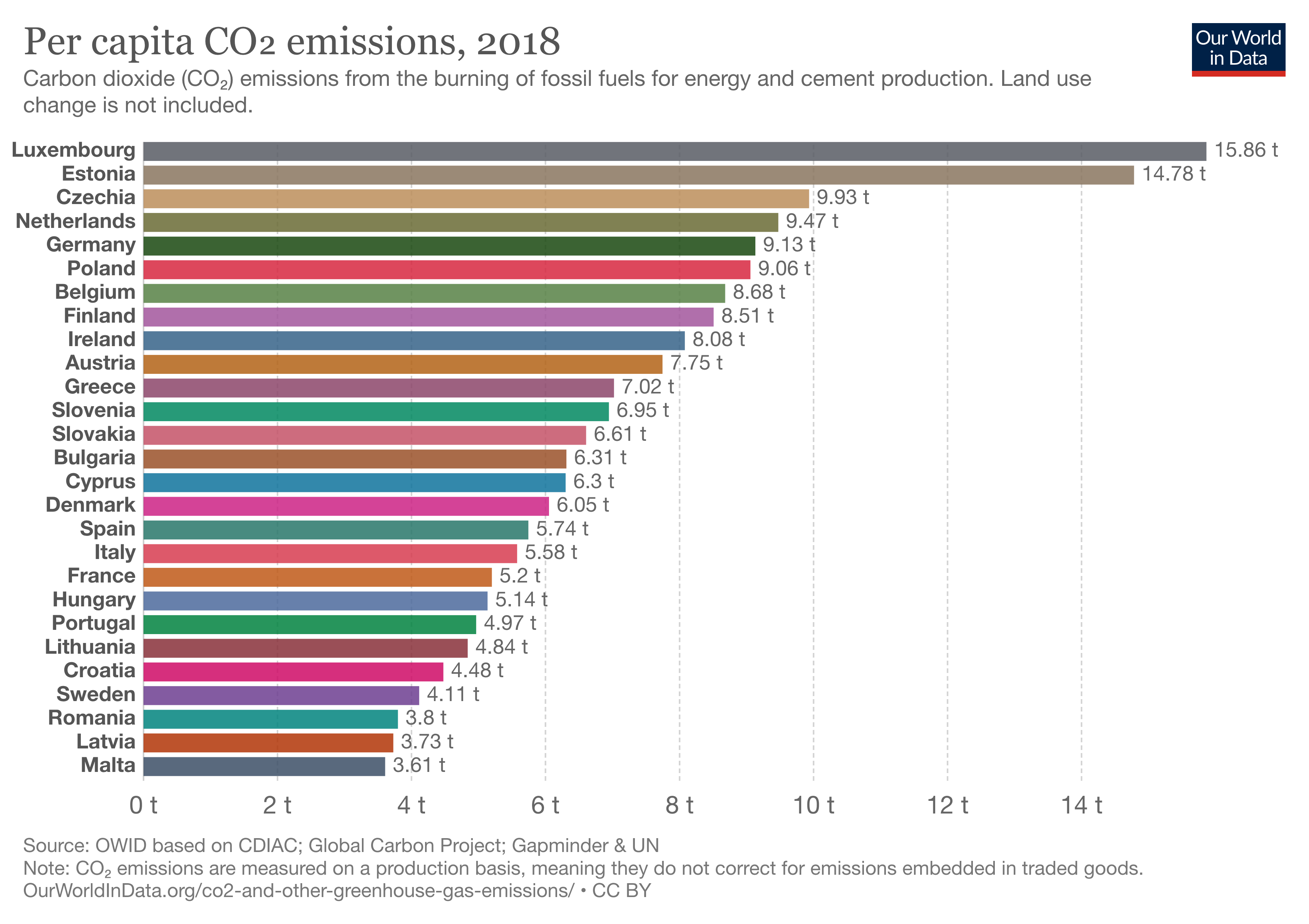
CO_{2} emissions per capita in the European Union

The European Union (EU) Environmental Policy was initiated in 1973 with the "Environmental Action Programme" at which point the Environmental Unit was formed (named Directorate General for the Environment in 1981). The policy has thereafter evolved "to cover a vast landscape of different topics enacted over many decades" (Reuters) and in 2015 the Institute for European Environmental Policy estimated that "the body of EU environmental law" amounted to more than 500 directives, regulations and decisions.

"Over the past decades the European Union has put in place a broad range of environmental legislation. As a result, air, water and soil pollution has significantly been reduced. Chemicals legislation has been modernised and the use of many toxic or hazardous substances has been restricted. Today, EU citizens enjoy some of the best water quality in the world" (European Commission, EAP 2020)

== History ==
=== Start at the Paris summit 1972 ===
The Paris Summit meeting of heads of state and government of the European Economic Community (EEC) in October 1972 is often used to pin point the beginning of the EU's environmental policy. A declaration on environmental and consumer policy was adopted at this summit which requested the European Commission to draw up an action programme for environmental protection. This (first) Environmental Action Programme was adopted in July 1973 and represented the EU's first environmental policy. Furthermore, the task force within the Commission that drew up this action programme eventually led to the formation of a Directorate General for the Environment.

The primary reason at that time for the introduction of a common environmental policy was the concern that diverse environmental standards could result in trade barriers and competitive distortions in the Common Market. Different national standards for particular products, such as limitations on vehicle emissions for the lead content of petrol, posed significant barriers to the free trade of these products within the Economic Community (EC). An additional motivation driving the EU's emerging environmental policy was the increasing international politicisation of environmental problems and the growing realisation from the beginning of the 1970s that environmental pollution did not stop at national borders, but had to be addressed by cross-border measures. At that time there was no mention of environmental policy in the founding treaties of the EU and therefore no explicit Treaty basis which underpinned EU environmental policy. However, the Treaty text was interpreted dynamically, enabling environmental policy to be regarded as an essential goal of the Community, even though it was not explicitly mentioned. It was not until the middle of the 1980s and the signing of the Single European Act in 1986 that economic and ecological objectives were put on a more equal footing within the Community.

=== Numerous actors involved ===
EU environmental policy is shaped by a variety of actors including all of the main EU institutions as well as lobby groups which makeup the wider Brussels policy making community.

Member states shape EU environmental policy by working within the Council of Ministers. The council is a central actor in decision making in the EU sharing its decision-making power with the European Parliament under the 'ordinary legislative procedure'. There are different Council formations (made up of ministers responsible for particular policy areas) one of which is the Environment Council. The number of Environment Council meetings has increased significantly over time. Heads of state meet in something different – the European Council – which until recently had very little to do with environmental policy. However, more recently the European Council has played an important role in EU climate change policy in particular.

The European Commission not only has an exclusive right to propose new environmental policy, but it also has a responsibility to ensure the implementation of environmental rules. Therefore, since its creation in the 1950s the European Commission has been at the heart of the European Union. However, it did not set up a unit dedicated to environmental issues until the 1970s and a full Directorate General for the environment until 1981. Initially DG Environment was perceived as a relatively weak DG but it has gradually become more assertive through the development of technical and political expertise. However, the Commission still has to depend on member states to implement its policies.

Traditionally, the European Parliament gained a reputation as a champion of environmental interests within the EU where it provided an access point for those excluded from decision making and a voice for green political parties. However, it was a reactive and relatively weak institution. More recently the Parliament has benefited from treaty changes that have made it a co-legislator with the Council of Ministers. However, the empowerment of the Parliament seems to have reduced its green credentials as it now appears less willing to adopt green amendments.

Over the last 40 years the EU has attracted the interest of a vast number of lobby groups including environmental NGOs. As early as 1974, environmental groups from all the member states established a central representation in Brussels, founding the European Environmental Bureau. Other environmental NGOs only set up shop in Brussels from the late 1980s onwards. European institutions, especially the European Commission, provide relatively easy access to these groups compared to some national governments. The European Commission has even actively encouraged their participation in policy making by setting up consultative committees and other bodies, and providing funds to establish and maintain certain core groups.

=== A complex policy processes ===
Policy making in the EU can be complex. It has been suggested that the policy making process is too densely populated with veto players (i.e. actors whose agreement is necessary for a policy to be adopted) for any single actor or group of actors (including the EU's member states) to consistently control the direction of policy making. The result in environmental policy making has been widely depicted as being especially unpredictable, unstable and at times even chaotic. However, the European Commission, as a key player in the policy making process, has been put under pressure to develop 'standard operating procedures' for processing policy. This has led to a number of changes in policy making processes in recent years, including: adopting minimum standards of consultation; the impact assessment of all major policy proposals; and the earlier publication of its work programmes.

The focus of EU environmental policy making has also changed in recent years concentrating more on updating existing policies than on building-up the EU's role in environmental policy. In the 1970s and 1980s EU environmental policy was marked by the rapid build-up of a body of legislation that covered a range of issues previously not dealt with at EU level. Since the 1980s, other new issues have been taken up but in addition an increasing proportion of the environmental agenda has been taken up by debates on the revision of existing legislation. As a result, the proportion of EU environmental legislation that amends previous laws has steadily increased over time. Consequently, for most environmental issues, the key question is no longer: 'should the EU be involved?’ but 'what should the EU be doing?’ And the logic for getting the issue on the EU political agenda is no longer to make the EU take it up but to change existing policies (strengthening or weakening them, depending on a political actor's objectives). This change in both the stakes of and the key struggle in agenda setting strategies, marks a shift from 'new issues' to 'ongoing or recurring concerns'.

In its policy making processes the EU has made a sizeable effort to undertake a particular type of policy coordination, namely the integration of environmental considerations into the operation of all policy sectors. The potential of environmental policy integration is undoubtedly ambitious: economically powerful sectors such as agriculture, energy and transport should 'design out' environmental problems in the development of their own policies. However, it has proven much harder to implement than many had originally expected, not least those working in the European Commission's environment directorate-general. A significant causal factor here has been the EU's fragmented institutional and political structure, which on the one hand has facilitated the adoption of visionary policy objectives, but has also undermined their implementation.

Implementation is very much at the 'sharp end' of the EU policy process. The success of EU policies – and with them the whole integration project – are often judged by the impacts they have on the ground. If, however, the acquis (the body of EU law) is not fully implemented, EU policies risk becoming paper exercises with little tangible effect on environmental quality but serious distorting impacts on the Single Market. The implementation of policy in the EU is widely regarded as being problematic. Yet, both public and academic understanding of this crucial stage of the EU policy process remains relatively limited. Indeed, for a long time, a number of factors kept the whole issue of poor implementation down or off the political agenda, but today it is much more politicised, pushed along by the campaigning activities of NGOs and pro-integration actors such as the European Parliament. A whole host of solutions to the EU's implementation problems have been offered, some of which could, if deployed, even compound the problem. But in many respects, the causes of poor (or at least imperfect) implementation reside in the very structure of the EU. Consequently, there are likely to be no panaceas.

To develop new environmental policies, it is important first to evaluate those that have already been adopted. However, this intuitively simple idea is difficult to apply in practice, no more so than in the EU where the complex system of multi-level governance adds considerably to the practical difficulty of evaluating policies. Assessing impacts and finding side-effects of policies is best achieved by a plurality of data, methods, analysts and theories, as well as evaluation criteria. In recent years the demand for evaluations of EU policies and programmes has increased as the importance of evaluation has become more widely recognised. Many actors have become involved in commissioning, producing and using evaluations (including the European Environment Agency), but the role of evaluation is often still quite weak.

Synergic to the environmental policy in Europe is the European environmental research and innovation policy. It aims at defining and implementing a transformative agenda to greening the economy and the society as a whole so to achieve a truly sustainable development.

=== Global influence ===
The EU is an important – even an 'influential' – actor in international environmental negotiations. Therefore, if one wants to understand the processes and outcomes of international environmental negotiations, one needs to be familiar with the role that the EU plays. Also, developments at the international level have an influence on the EU, its policies and the extent to which it can be a global actor. Hence, European and international environmental politics and policies are constantly interacting and thus mutually constitutive.

The EU is a party to all major Multi-lateral Environmental Agreements covering a whole variety of environmental issues. The EU is also able to fully participate in international environmental negotiations, either as an observer in the UN context or as a party to the mother treaty in various Conference of the parties (COPs) and Meeting of the Parties (MOPs). The EU is often observed as a leader in global environmental politics, but its leadership role can nowadays also be questioned, especially in the area of climate change. The EU's international climate change policy consists of three building blocks (environmental integrity, multilateralism, a legally binding instrument), which are under pressure in the context of the current climate change negotiations. As in other areas of external action, the EU's external environmental policy is often characterised by a mismatch between its ambitions and its ability to deliver in practice.

Even environmental measures that are not part of international agreements and have effect only in the territory of the union, sometimes have big international effects. For example, in 2022 The European parliament approved a very important bill aiming to stop the import linked with deforestation. The bill requires from companies who want to import 14 products: soy, beef, palm oil, timber, cocoa, coffee, pork, lamb, goat meat, poultry, rubber, charcoal, and printed paper to the European Union to prove the production of those commodities is not linked to areas deforested after 31 of December 2019. Without it the import will be forbidden. The bill may cause to Brazil, for example, to stop deforestation for agricultural production and begun to "increase productivity on existing agricultural land".

By 15 November 2025, the European Union, China, Brazil and 15 other countries had joined the Open Coalition on Compliance Carbon Markets. The coalition aims to establiush a global carbon market and is considered as one of the main results of COP 30. A global carbon market can speed up emission reduction seven-fold. The EU supports the coalition which is expected to be formally launched during 2026.

=== Environmental protection ===
When the EEC was established, environmental protection, let alone the broader concept of sustainable development, was not perceived as an important policy issue. The concept of sustainable development contains environmental, social and economic dimensions; finding practical ways to balance the three is widely regarded as a key challenge. The EU policies in the field of sustainable development evolved as a result of the interaction between internal political drivers and the EU's response to a number of key UN conferences. One such influential conference was the first UN Conference on the Human Environment held in Stockholm in 1972. This not only addressed the environmental concerns of the industrialised countries in the North, but also, the development concerns of countries in the South. Sustainable development was only mentioned in European Council Conclusions for the first time in 1988. Wavering political support for 'sustained growth' and/or 'sustainable development' continued for some years and reveals just how ambivalent attitudes were to the concept. The 1997 Treaty of Amsterdam eventually ensured the formal recognition of sustainable development as a legal objective under the Treaties. Subsequently, the EU's commitment to sustainable development was formalised as one of the EU's fundamental goals.

In 1997, the EU committed itself to draw up a 'national' strategy for sustainable development by 2002. The Commission published a Communication on a European Union Strategy for Sustainable Development in 2001 which was discussed at the Göteborg European Council. However, this strategy suffered from several governance weaknesses which inhibited its implementation. In particular, the Strategy has been heavily affected by its ambiguous relationship to the Lisbon Strategy for growth and jobs, which has received far higher political priority.

The political and institutional crisis that faced the EU in 2005 after the rejection of the EU Constitution, pushed the Sustainable Development Strategy back up the political agenda. A 'renewed' SDS was subsequently adopted by the EU Council in 2006. The renewed strategy contained more detailed arrangements for implementation, monitoring and follow-up.

The legal formalisation of the EU's commitment to sustainable development as a policy objective was completed by the Lisbon Treaty. Sustainable development is now repeatedly mentioned in the Treaties: as a basic objective of the EU in the new Article 3 TEU; in Article 21 TEU concerning the external action of the Union; and in Article 11 TFEU setting out the integration principle. The EU is now legally committed to pursue sustainable development both internally and externally (i.e. in its relations with 'the wider world').

This legal commitment led to the setting up of an impact assessment process to be done ex ante, i.e. before the fact, to ensure that all future EU legislation would conform to the principles of sustainable development as laid down in the EU Strategy for Sustainable Development. In fact, multiple processes of impact assessment emerged: Commission-wide Impact Assessment for all future EU legislation, Sustainability Impact Assessment (SIA) for DG Trade and Integrated Sustainability Assessment (ISA) as envisioned in EU-funded research projects such as MATISSE, In-Context and VISION RD4SD, which has been recommended for consideration as a methodology for future global assessments.

=== Free trade challenges to EU environmental policy ===
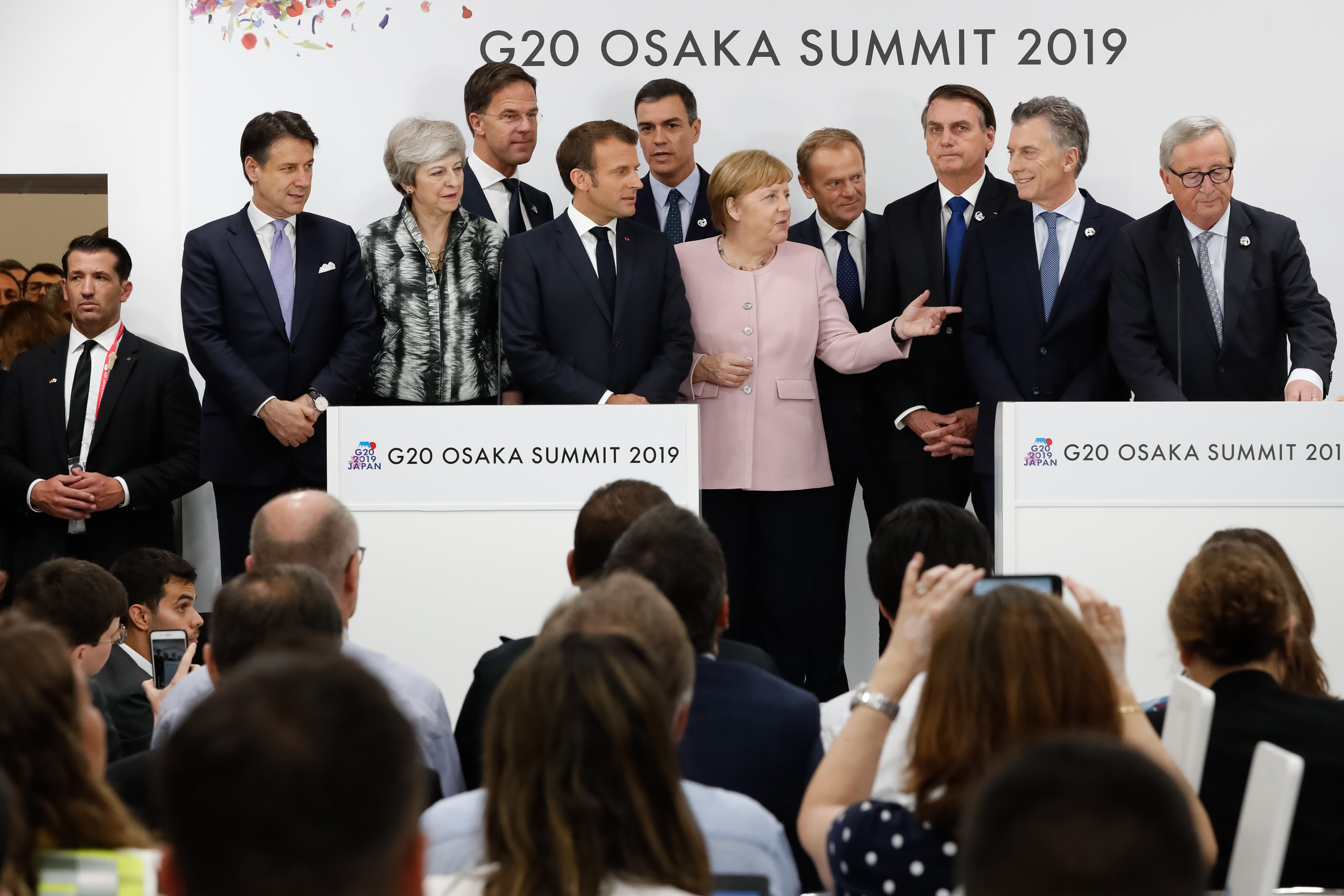
The European Union–Mercosur free trade agreement, which would form one of the world's largest free trade areas, has been denounced by environmental activists and indigenous rights campaigners.

A draft of the sustainable development section of Transatlantic Trade and Investment Partnership (TTIP) between the EU and the US was leaked to The Guardian in October 2015. Asked to comment on the document, a French environmental attorney described the proposed environmental safeguards as "virtually non-existent" by comparison with the protection granted to investors, and that environmental cases accounted for 60% of the 127 ISDS cases already brought against EU countries under bilateral trade agreements in the last two decades, according to Friends of the Earth Europe. According to Joseph E. Stiglitz, TTIP could have a "chilling" effect on regulation and thus "undercut urgently needed action on climate that the Paris Agreement requires".

The draft energy chapter of the TTIP was leaked to The Guardian in July 2016. This draft could sabotage European efforts to implement mandatory energy savings measures and to favour the switch to renewable electricity generation.

== Policy key components ==
The Environmental policy range from subjects such as Water to Tackling climate change, Air, Chemicals, Nature & biodiversity, Noise, Soil & forests, Waste, Coastal & marine environment, Industry & pollution and Environmental agencies/controls. It is formulated through Environment Action Programmes (EAP) out of which there are eight published to date;

- 1st – Programme of Action of the European Communities on the Environment (1973–1976)
- 2nd – European Community Action Programme on the Environment (1977–1981)
- 3rd – Action Programme of the European Communities on the Environment (1982–1986)
- 4th – EEC Fourth Environmental Action Program (1987–1992)
- 5th – Community programme of policy and action in relation to the environment and sustainable development (1993–2000)
- 6th – the Sixth Community Environment Action Programme (2002–2012)
- 7th – the Seventh Environment Action Programme (2014–2020)
- 8th – the Eight Environment Action Programme until 2030, "builds on the European Green Deal" (2021–)

=== Policy examples ===
==== The European environmental research and innovation policy ====
The European environmental research and innovation policy aims at promoting research and innovation for building a resource-efficient and climate-resilient society and economy in sync with the natural environment. Research and innovation in Europe are financially supported by the programme Horizon 2020, which is also open to participation worldwide.

==== The Water Framework Directive and the Birds Directive ====
The Water Framework Directive is an example of a water policy which aimed for rivers, lakes, ground and coastal waters to be of "good quality" by 2015. The Birds Directive established as early as 1979 and the Habitats Directive are pieces of European Union legislation for protection of biodiversity and natural habitats. These protections however only directly cover animals and plants; fungi and micro-organisms have no protection under European Union law. The directives are implemented through the Natura 2000 programme and covers 30,000 sites throughout Europe.

==== The Environmental Crime Directive ====
The Environmental Crime Directive is a 2008 instrument aimed at protecting the environment through the use of criminal law. After over a decade from its publication, as part of the European Green Deal, the European Commission submitted a proposal for a new Directive with the aim of strengthening the enforcement and prosecution of environmental crimes through the use of clearer definitions and sanctions other than the typical fines and imprisonment.

==== Nature restoration law ====
The Nature Restoration Law is a regulation (Regulation (EU) 2024/1991) of the European Union to protect the EU environments and restore its nature to a good ecological state through renaturation. The law is a core element of the European Green Deal and the EU Biodiversity Strategy and makes the targets set therein for the "restoration of nature" binding. EU member states will have to develop their national restoration plans by 2026. They will have to restore at least 30% of habitats in poor condition by 2030, 60% by 2040, and 90% by 2050.

The regulation is a response to Europe's declining natural environments, with more than 80% of habitats in poor condition. Its goals include protecting the functioning of ecosystem services, climate change mitigation, resilience and autonomy by preventing natural disasters and reducing risks to food security, and restoring damaged ecosystems.

The regulation was proposed by the European Commission on 22 June 2022. The law was adopted in the Council of the European Union on 17 June 2024 and was published in the EU's Official Journal on 29 July 2024, thus coming into force on 18 August 2024 (20th day after publication).

The representative of Austria, Leonore Gewessler, voted against the will of its government and can face up to 10 years in prison for doing so. Gewessler had previously been unable to support the law due to unanimous opposition from Austria's nine states, however Vienna and Carinthia withdrew opposition following changes to the proposed law without explicitly shifting the unanimous stance.

== See also ==
- EU law
- Coordination of Information on the Environment
- Directorate-General for the Environment
- EU FLEGT Action Plan
- European Commissioner for the Environment
- European Environment Agency
- Environmental policy
- Environmental racism in Europe
- Geography of the European Union
  - Common Agricultural Policy
  - Common Fisheries Policy
  - Natura 2000
- Global warming and the Kyoto Protocol
  - European Climate Change Programme
  - European Union Emission Trading Scheme
  - Renewable energy in the European Union
  - Transport in the European Union
- Registration, Evaluation and Authorization of Chemicals (REACH) directive
- Water supply and sanitation in the European Union
  - Water Framework Directive
