= Integral City =

Book by Marilyn Hamilton

- Author: Marilyn Hamilton
- Language: English
- Publisher: New Society Publishers
- Publication date: 2008
- Publication place: Canada
- Pages: 352
- ISBN: 9780865716292

Integral City: Evolutionary Intelligences for the Human Hive (2008) is a book by Marilyn Hamilton. It posits a concept called the "Integral City", which is a city as a living human system. It is architecture and city planning based on Integral Theory.

Hamilton's book came out of her dissertation The Berkana Community of Conversations (Hamilton, 1999), and other published articles and conference papers by Hamilton.

== Reception ==
The book was reviewed in World Future Review, Kosmos Journal, Futurist, Alternatives Journal, Canadian Journal of Urban Research, and EnlightenNext.
