= Ophuls =

Ophuls may refer to:

- Max Ophüls (1902–1957), German-born film director who adopted the spelling "Ophuls"
- Marcel Ophuls (1927–2025), Max Ophüls' son, German-born film director with French and American citizenship who adopted the same spelling
- William Ophuls, the pen name of Patrick Ophuls, (born 1934), American pioneer in modern environmental movement.
