= Individual and group rights =

Notion of rights of individuals and collective rights

Individual rights, also known as natural rights, are rights held by individuals by virtue of being human. Some theists believe individual rights are bestowed by God. An individual right is a moral claim to freedom of action.

Group rights, also known as collective rights, are rights held by a group as a whole rather than individually by its members. In contrast, individual rights are rights held by individual people; even if they are group-differentiated, which most rights are, they remain individual rights if the right-holders are the individuals themselves.

Individual rights and group rights are often incompatible. An appeal to group rights is often used to promote violation of individual rights. Historically, group rights have been used both to infringe upon and to facilitate individual rights, and the concept remains controversial.

== Organizational group rights ==
Besides the rights of groups based upon the immutable characteristics of their individual members, other group rights exercised and enshrined in law at different levels including those held by organizational persons, including nation-states, trade unions, corporations, trade associations, chambers of commerce, specific ethnic groups, and political parties. Such organizations are accorded rights that are particular to their specifically stated functions and their capacities to speak on behalf of their members, i.e. the capacity of the corporation to speak to the government on behalf of all individual customers or employees or the capacity of the trade union to negotiate for benefits with employers on behalf of all workers in a company.

== Philosophies ==
In the political views of classical liberals and some right-libertarians, the role of the government is solely to identify, protect, and enforce the natural rights of the individual while attempting to assure just remedies for transgressions. Liberal governments that respect individual rights often provide for systemic controls that protect individual rights such as a system of due process in criminal justice. Certain collective rights, for example, the right of "self-determination of peoples," enshrined in Chapter I Article I of the United Nations Charter, enable the establishment to assert these individual rights. If people are unable to determine their collective future, they are certainly unable to assert or ensure their individual rights, future and freedoms. Critics suggest that both are necessarily connected and intertwined, rejecting the assertion that they exist in a mutually exclusive relationship.

Adam Smith, in his book The Wealth of Nations (1776), describes the right of each successive generation, as a group, collectively, to the earth and all the earth possesses. The United States Declaration of Independence states several group, or collective, rights of the people as well as the states, for example the Right of the People: "whenever any Form of Government becomes destructive of these ends, it is the Right of the People to alter or to abolish it" and the right of the States: "... as Free and Independent States, they have full Power to levy War, conclude Peace, contract Alliances, establish Commerce, and to do all other Acts and Things which Independent States may of right do."

Dutch legal philosopher Hugo Krabbe (1908) outlined the difference between the community and individual perspectives:

Thus, two kinds of perspectives on the state emerge from the history of the theory of the state. That of antiquity takes the community as a natural given, sees in her a being of the fullest reality, bearer of all cultural life, requiring no more justification than the existence of the Sun. And there can be no question of granting rights here either, because the only being from whom those rights could come, the individual, derives his jurisdiction precisely from belonging to the community, and only from that. Opposed to this is the conception of the state from the school of natural law, which takes the individual as its starting point, asserts his natural freedom as a right, creates the community from his will and endows her with rights derived from him. To recap,

on the one hand, the community is primary, with her own original right, and the individual secondary, with his rights derived from the community;

on the other hand, the individual is primary, with all the content of his natural freedom as a right, and the community is secondary, a product of individual will and therefore dependent on him in jurisdiction.

The Soviet Union argued in line with Marxism–Leninism that the Universal Declaration of Human Rights overprioritized individual rights over group rights.

== See also ==
- Affirmative action – Policies aiming to increase inclusion of people from marginalized groups
- Collective identity – Shared sense of belonging to a group
- Collectivism and individualism
- Common good – What is shared and beneficial for all or most members of a given community
- Constitutional economics – Research program in economics and constitutionalism
- Corporate personhood – Notion that corporations can have some legal rights, responsibilities and accountability
- Critical pedagogy – Philosophy of education
- Ethnic interest group – Special interest group
- Freedom of movement – Right of people to travel within and outside their own country
- Identity (social science) – Qualities, beliefs, personality, looks and/or expressions that distinguish a person
- Identity politics – Politics based on one's identity
- Indigenism – Several different ideologies associated with indigenous peoples
- Institutionalized discrimination
- Interest group liberalism
- Liberation psychology – Approach to psychology
- Minority rights – Rights of members of minority groups
- Popular front – Coalition of different political groupings
- Primordialism – Idea that nations or ethnic identities are fixed, natural and ancient
- Protected group – Demographic label
- Public rights – Rights which belong to citizens but are vested in and vindicated by political entities
- Reparations (transitional justice) – Compensation given for an abuse or injury
- Right to development – Human right
- Right to exist – Conceptual right of nations
- Self-determination – Right to participate in one's own governance
- Special rights – Political rights given to some groups
- Three generations of human rights – Division of human rights into three chronological categories
- Voting bloc – Group of voters motivated by a common concern
