= The End of Liberalism =

1969 book by Theodore J. Lowi

The End of Liberalism: The Second Republic of the United States
- First edition
- Author: Theodore J. Lowi
- Language: English
- Subject: Political science
- Genre: non-fiction
- Publisher: Norton
- Publication date: 1979
- Publication place: United States
- Media type: hardcover
- Pages: 331
- ISBN: 978-0-393-09000-0

The End of Liberalism: The Second Republic of the United States is a non-fiction book by Theodore J. Lowi and is considered a modern classic of political science. Originally published in 1969 (under the title The End of Liberalism, with no subtitle), the book was revised for a second edition in 1979 with the political developments of the 1970s taken into consideration. The book examines the developments of government during the years between the Great Depression and its publishing date.

== Summary ==
Lowi proposes that classical liberalism and capitalism have died as a public philosophy and have been replaced by interest group liberalism. Lowi goes on to explore the flaws and consequences of interest group liberalism. Lowi argues that the government has grown too large due to Congress assuming power and delegating authority to administrative agencies rather than coming up with a solution to problems within congress. He suggests that American politics has become controlled by interest groups in which politicians associate. Lowi contends that, because of this, the United States has entered into what he calls "The Second Republic". He then suggests that interest group liberalism needs to be replaced by a juridical democracy in order to restore the rule of law.

== Reception and influence ==
Elizabeth Sanders reviewed The End of Liberalism: The Second Republic of the United States in her article "The contributions of Theodore Lowi to political analysis and democratic theory". Within this article Sanders breaks the article down into three parts: the policy analysis scheme, democratic theory, and constitutional advocacy. Sanders praises the second section as "the most lasting contribution".

Sanders sums up her reception of Lowi by expressing her view that the Democratic Party should use Lowi's ideas to rise to meet the Republicans. She even goes as far as to state that "In Theodore Lowi they would have a powerful philosopher. That hasn't been true of the party since Thomas Jefferson."

In his article reviewing the first and second editions of The End of Liberalism, Robert C. Grady explained that most initial criticisms of the first edition were due to the text's abrupt end with an "incomplete" description of juridical liberalism. Harvey C. Mansfield, Jr., in his "Disguised Liberalism", criticized Lowi for "failing to recognize that liberal democracy must have virtuous elites to filter out extreme and unwise values and whose roles must be disguised". William E. Connolly said that "Lowi's prescriptions require a citizenry imbued with civic virtue". In practical application, this need for a sense of "civic virtue" on the side of the citizenry is problematic, as "legislatures, let alone citizens, do not begin with civic virtue, nor do they end up talking about it".

Grady's review focuses on the additions made to the second edition of The End of Liberalism. While Lowi's additions provide clarity, Grady still labels the work as a polemic. While Lowi provides many examples of juridical democracy's advantages, he does nothing to address the unlikelihood that Congress would ever address the wide sweeping reforms necessary to implement it.

While the practical application of juridical democracy is questionable, even Grady (and other critics of Lowi) agree that as a theory, juridical democracy provides another tool with which "the political scientist probes the weaknesses and liabilities of political practice" by questioning the process and outcomes of interest-group liberalism. Grady admits that while Lowi has not been able to catch the attention of political leadership, his analysis of interest-group liberalism has been adopted by many political scientists, and is "perhaps the most systematic and telling critique of pluralism to have emerged from the controversial decade of the 1960s".
