= OECD Environmental Performance Reviews =

Environmental protection progress assessments in high-power countries

The OECD Environmental Performance Reviews programme provides independent assessments of countries’ progress in achieving domestic and international environmental policy commitments. The programme has completed over 60 reviews that aim to help improve individual and collective performance in environmental management by: promoting peer learning; enhancing countries’ accountability to each other and to the public; and helping governments to assess progress in achieving their environmental goals.

The OECD provides targeted recommendations designed to reinforce national environmental policy initiatives, bringing about positive change to the environment. Recommendations are supported by a broad range of economic and environmental data.

== About the reports ==
The reports review the environmental performance of a country about every 10 years. Each cycle of the Environmental Performance Reviews covers all OECD member countries and selected partner countries. Progress in achieving domestic objectives and international commitments provides the basis for assessing environmental performance. Such objectives and commitments may be broad aims, qualitative goals, or quantitative targets. A distinction is made between intentions, actions and results. Assessment of environmental performance is also placed within the context of a country's historical environmental record, present state of the environment, physical endowment in natural resources, economic conditions, and demographic trends.

The reports are prepared by the Environment Directorate at the OECD, with the contribution of reviewers from a number of examining countries. The Working Party on Environmental Performance discusses the reports at their twice-yearly meetings and approves the Assessment and Recommendations.

The policy recommendations aim to provide further support to a country's initiatives on issues such as: greening growth; implementing environmental policies; international co-operation; climate change; energy and environment integration; coastal zone management; nature and biodiversity; waste management.

Since the inception of the Environmental Performance Reviews programme in 1992, most of the OECD member countries have been reviewed twice: during the first (1992–2000) and the second (2001–09) cycle. Some OECD non-members were reviewed, such as China and Russia. The third cycle of reviews was launched in 2009, with the reviews of Japan, Portugal and Norway. In 2010, reviews of Israel and the Slovak Republic were launched and were published in 2011. The Reviews of Germany and Slovenia were released in 2012, with Italy and Mexico in 2013.

== History of the programme ==
Environment Ministers of OECD member countries, at their meeting in January 1991, called on the OECD to start environmental performance reviews of member countries. This mandate was subsequently confirmed by the OECD Council meeting at Ministerial level in June 1991, and supported by the London G-7 economic summit in July 1991. The reviews identify good practices and make recommendations aimed at improving environmental policies and programmes.

Work began in 1992 under the management of the OECD Working Party on Environmental Performance. The third cycle of the EPRs, launched in 2009, aims to sharpen the focus on performance and on selected issues that are of high priority in the reviewed countries.

== Scope of the reviews ==
The second cycle of Environmental Performance Reviews (2001–09) consisted of three substantive blocks of issues:

i) Environmental Management which covered air, water, nature/biodiversity and waste management which are the core tasks of Environment Ministries and related Agencies;

ii) Sustainable Development which covered economic and sectoral integration of environmental consideration and environment-social interface;

iii) International Commitments covered international (global, regional and bilateral) co-operation on environmental matters (e.g. transboundary air and water pollution, transboundary movement of waste, marine and climate change issues).

Reviews in the 3rd cycle, launched in 2009 enhance policy advice and implementation by focusing on a few selected issues in each country review, while maintaining basic comprehensive coverage and accountability for the major environmental challenges. They speed up the review cycle by increasing the number of country reviews carried out per year, reducing the period between reviews of individual countries from between eight and nine down to five-to-six years.

== Review methodology ==
The Environmental Performance Reviews are evidence- and factual accuracy-based, relying on sound national and international data. The approach of the reviews has given priority to: i) identifying national objectives (i.e. aims, goals, and targets); ii) identifying international commitments of the reviewed country; and iii) using of statistics and indicators to measure the achievement of targets. The Environmental Performance Review programme emphasises the use of economic analysis. The polluter pays principle, the user pays principle, economic efficiency, integration of environmental and financial-fiscal policies, as well as integration of environmental and sector policies (e.g. energy, transport, agriculture) are constant features of the reports.

== Preparation ==
The preparation of an Environmental Performance Review begins with a preliminary mission by the Secretariat to the country under review to agree on the scope of topics to be examined. Some topics are standard for all countries to ensure consistency in a given cycle, while there are specific topics for each country review.

The Secretariat then assembles a review team (8-10 members), which typically includes experts from three reviewing countries, Secretariat staff and consultants. Non-member countries engaged in the policy dialogue with the OECD are encouraged to participate in review missions, as observers. Preparations also include data and information gathering by the Secretariat, in co-operation with the reviewed country, as well as consultation with country desks within the OECD. The OECD Working Party on Environmental Information supports the process by providing internationally harmonised environmental data. National sources of information are also made available to team members.

== Review missions ==
During the review mission the team meets with government and non-government representatives of the country under review, including environment and other ministry officials, representatives of industry, trade unions, NGOs, independent experts and local governments. Discussions focus on the evaluation of environmental performance and policy responses.

== Peer review meetings ==
A draft report, prepared by the Secretariat is presented and discussed at the twice-yearly meetings of the OECD Working Party on Environmental Performance, usually held at the OECD headquarters in Paris.

A full day is allocated to the "peer" examination of a given country. The reviewed country delegation is headed by a high level government official, usually the Minister or the Secretary of State, and consists of several members representing the Environment Ministry and other relevant government agencies. The reviewing countries take the lead in opening the discussion. All countries participate in the debate. At the end of the meeting the Working Party approves the "Assessment and Recommendations". The exchange of views helps countries better understand the issues at stake in the reviewed country and critically assess policy responses with a view to identifying good practices and challenges ahead. An important benefit of serving as reviewer is to draw first-hand experience from the reviewed country developments, draw lessons and bring ideas back home.

== Publications ==
Following the peer review meetings country reports are published under the authority of the OECD Secretary-General. They are primarily targeted at decision-makers. The active role of the reviewed country in circulating the report and ensuring wide dissemination of its findings is critical to the implementation of the recommendations. The reports are also aimed at a wider audience (general public, NGOs, industry, government at different levels) in the country under review, and therefore help to achieve the third specific aim of the programme, i.e. to stimulate greater accountability of governments towards public opinion. Release of the reports in the public domain is associated with a press conference in the reviewed country with the participation of the Environment Minister and OECD high-level officials, often the Secretary-General. The press event is sometimes followed by a seminar (e.g. with Parliamentarians). The "Highlights" document is released to present the key findings of the review.

== Follow-up and monitoring ==
Countries are encouraged to prepare progress reports on the implementation of the recommendations at mid-term between two cycles. The reports are presented and discussed at the Working Party meetings.

== Co-operation with other programmes ==
Co-operation with the United Nations Economic Commission for Europe (UNECE) on the EPR methodology has contributed to the establishment of a "daughter" programme for non-OECD member countries within the UNECE area. The UNECE Secretariat has participated in several OECD review missions (Netherlands, Norway, Poland, Switzerland). The first cycle of EPRs has reviewed some non member countries of the UNECE, such as Belarus, Bulgaria and Russia, in close co-operation with the UNECE Secretariat.

Similar co-operation has developed with the United Nations Economic Commission for Latin America and the Caribbean (UNECLAC) with the participation of the UNECLAC Secretariat in the reviews of Canada, Spain and Chile. The OECD review of Chile was conducted in close co-operation with UNECLAC.

Co-operation has been extended to the Asian Development Bank (ADB) for the Chinese province of Yunnan in the Greater Mekong region. This paved the way for the OECD review of China, which was carried out as part of the second cycle of reviews. Chinese observers participated in the review missions of Norway and Japan and in the Working Party meetings of Norway, Japan and Korea.
