= Theodore J. Lowi =

American political scientist (1931–2017)

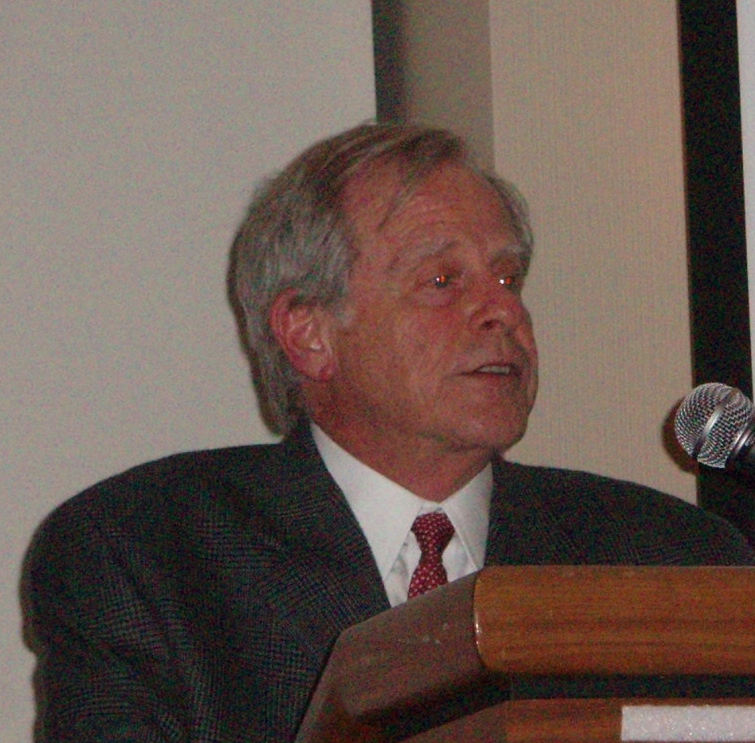
- Lowi in 2009
- Born: July 9, 1931; Gadsden, Alabama, U.S.
- Died: February 17, 2017 (aged 85); Ithaca, New York, U.S.
- Board member of: Cornell Institute for Public Affairs

Academic background
- Education: Yale University

Academic work
- Discipline: Public policy
- Institutions: Cornell University
- Notable works: The End of Liberalism

Theodore J. Lowi (July 9, 1931 – February 17, 2017) was an American political scientist. He was the John L. Senior Professor of American Institutions teaching in the Government Department at Cornell University. His area of research was the American government and public policy. He was a member of the core faculty of the Cornell Institute for Public Affairs.

== Biography ==
Theodore J. Lowi was born on July 9, 1931, in Gadsden, Alabama, to a Jewish family. He and his wife, Angele, reared two children, Anna and Jason. He made his home in Ithaca, New York. Lowi obtained a Bachelor of Arts from Michigan State University in 1954, and a Master of Arts and Ph.D. from Yale University in New Haven, Connecticut, in 1955 and 1961, respectively. He served as president of the American Political Science Association (APSA), in 1991, and as president of the International Political Science Association, from 1997 to 2000.

In a poll of the APSA membership in 1978 he was named the most influential political scientist in the United States. In a membership survey of the Political Organizations and Parties section of the APSA in 1990, he was one of 40 scholars mentioned four or more times, among the total 137 scholars cited by the 265 respondents, as having a major influence on their research area. Lowi was a frequent guest on NPR, PBS, and cable television news-issues talk shows.

== Honors ==
- Honorary degree, University of Pavia, 2008.
- Wilbur Lucius Cross Medal, Yale Graduate School of Arts and Sciences, 2013.

== Policy typology ==
Lowi proposed four types of policy, namely distributive, redistributive, regulatory and constituent in his article "Four Systems of Policy, Politics and Choice" and in "American Business, Public Policy, Case Studies and Political Theory". Policy addresses the intent of the organization, whether government, business, professional, or voluntary. Policy is intended to affect the "real" world, by guiding the decisions that are made. Whether they are formally written or not, most organizations have identified policies.

Policies may be classified in many different ways. The following is a sample of several different types of policies broken down by their effect on members of the organization.

=== Distributive ===
Distributive policies involve government allocation of resources, services, or benefits to specific groups or individuals in society. The primary characteristic of distributive policies is that they aim to provide goods or services to a targeted group without significantly reducing the availability or benefits for other groups. These policies are often designed to promote economic or social equity. Examples include subsidies for farmers, social welfare programs, and funding for public education.

=== Regulatory ===
Regulatory policies aim to control or regulate the behavior and practices of individuals, organizations, or industries. These policies are intended to address issues related to public safety, consumer protection, and environmental conservation. Regulatory policies involve government intervention in the form of laws, regulations, and oversight. Examples include environmental regulations, labor laws, and safety standards for food and drugs. Another example of a fairly successful public regulatory policy is that of a highway speed limit.

=== Constituent ===
Constituent policies are less concerned with the allocation of resources or regulation of behavior, and more focused on representing the preferences and values of the public. These policies involve addressing public concerns and issues that may not have direct economic or regulatory implications. They often reflect the broader values and beliefs of the society. Constituent policies can include symbolic gestures, such as resolutions recognizing historical events or designating official state symbols. Constituent policies also deal with fiscal policy in some circumstances.

=== Redistributive ===
Redistributive policies involve the transfer of resources or benefits from one group to another, typically from the wealthy or privileged to the less advantaged. These policies seek to reduce economic or social inequality by taking from those with more and providing for those with less. Progressive taxation, welfare programs, and financial assistance to low-income households are examples of redistributive policies.

== Published work ==
- At the Pleasure of the Mayor: Patronage and Power in New York City, 1898–1958 (New York, 1964)
- Legislative Politics, U.S.A. (ed.) (Boston; 1962, 1965, 1974)
- The Pursuit of Justice (co-authored with Robert F. Kennedy) (New York, 1964)
- The End of Liberalism: The Second Republic of the United States (W.W. Norton 1969,1979). From dust jacket: "The main argument which Lowi develops through both editions is that the liberal state grew to its immense size and presence without self-examination and without recognizing that its pattern of growth had problematic consequences. Its engine of growth was delegation. The government expanded by responding to the demands of all major organized interests, by assuming responsibility for programs sought by those interests, and by assigning that responsibility to administrative agencies. Through the process of accommodation, the agencies became captives of the interest groups, a tendency Lowi describes as clientelism. This in turn led to the formulation of new policies which tightened the grip of interest groups on the machinery of government."
- The Politics of Disorder (New York, 1971, 1974)
- Poliscide: Scientists, the Giant Accelerator and the Metropolis (et alia) (New York, 1975, 1990)
- American Government: Incomplete Conquest (New York, 1976, 1977, 1981)
- Nationalizing Government: Public Policies in America (et alia) (Beverly Hills, 1978)
- The Personal President: Power Invested, Promise Unfulfilled (Ithaca, 1985)
- American Government: Freedom & Power (with Benjamin Ginsburg) (New York, 1990, 1994)
- Democrats Return to Power: Politics and Policy in the Clinton Era(with Benjamim Ginsburg)(New York, 1994)
- The End of the Republican Era (1995)
- "American Business, Public Policy, Case-Studies, and Political Theory" (1964), World Politics 16(4):677–715. In this journal article, which reviews a book by Raymond A. Bauer, Ithiel de Sola Pool, and Lewis A. Dexter, Lowi lays out his classic typology of public policy in the U.S.: distribution, regulation, and redistribution. This typology was meant to help political scientists and policy scholars build theories of policy making that could be generalized beyond particular issue areas. Distributive policies, aka "pork barrel" programs, distribute resources from the government to particular recipients; the winners are concentrated but the losers (those who ultimately pay for the distribution) are diffuse. Regulatory policies are aimed at groups or classes of targets, rather than individuals, and they typically raise costs for the targets (in which case the costs are concentrated). Redistributive policies transfer resources from one class or group to another. A fourth category of policy named by Lowi is the constituent.
- "Hyperpolitics. A Interactive Dictionary of Political Science" (2010), with Mauro Calise, Chicago, Chicago University Press
- American Government: Power and Purpose (2012)
- "Concetti Chiave. Capire la Scienza politica" (2016), co-editor with Mauro Calise and Fortunato Musella, Bologna, Il Mulino
- " We The People 11th edition" (2017)

== See also ==
- Interest group liberalism
