= William Ophuls =

William Ophuls, the pen name of Patrick Ophuls, (born 1934) is an American political scientist, ecologist, independent scholar and author. He is known for his pioneering role in the modern environmental movement. His work focuses on some of the ecological, social, and political implications of modern industrial civilization.

== Biography ==
Born in 1934, Ophuls obtained his AB in oriental studies from Princeton University in 1955. Eighteen years later, in 1973, he obtained his PhD in political science from Yale University.

After his graduation from Princeton, Ophuls served in the U.S. Coast Guard as an officer for four years. After his discharge, he served for the next eight years in the United States Foreign Service at embassies in the Ivory Coast and Japan. After his graduation from Yale in 1973, he lectured at Northwestern University and Oberlin University for short periods. He then settled in as an independent scholar and author.

Ophuls was awarded the Sprout Prize from the International Studies Association for his 1977 book Ecology and the Politics of Scarcity. In 1992, a revised edition was published as Ecology and the Politics of Scarcity Revisited. This work received the Kammerer Award from the American Political Science Association.

== Work ==
=== Role in modern environmental movement ===
Ophuls played a part in the emergence of the modern environmental movement. The precursor of this movement in the United States was the early-20th century conservation movement, associated with President Theodore Roosevelt and Gifford Pinchot. This was the period in which U.S. Forest Service was formed, and that public concern for consumer protection began, spurred on by the publication of The Jungle by Upton Sinclair.

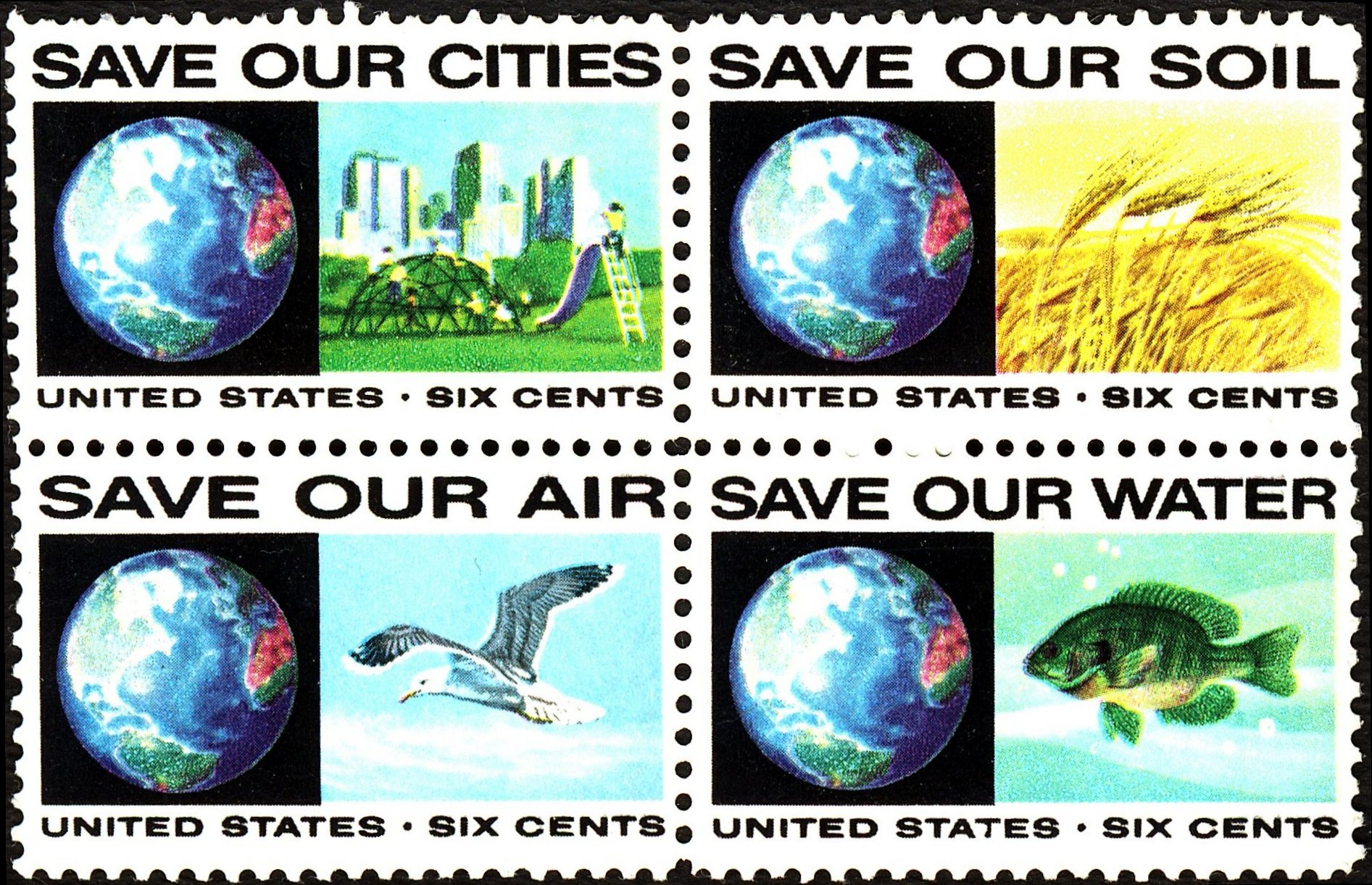
1970s U.S. postage stamp block

The origins of the modern environmental movement took place in the United States with the publication of Rachel Carson's Silent Spring, which pointed out the perils of pesticide use and rallied concern for the environment in general. Carson argued that nature deserved human protection and referred to pesticides as an atomic bomb for insects. She stated that these pesticides would cycle through the environment hurting humans and nature and thought they should be used wisely. Carson's work encouraged the environment activism that was soon to come.

Critiques of the misuse of technology from figures such as William Ophuls, Barry Commoner, and Garrett Hardin, and the ineffectiveness and criticism of the 1960s Clean Air Act and Clean Water Act, gave momentum to the environmental movement.

=== Leviathan or oblivion?, 1973 ===
With the essay, entitled "Leviathan or oblivion?", Ophuls contributed to the influential 1973 anthology Toward a Steady-state Economy, edited by Herman Daly. Other writers and topics in the 1973 edition included:

- Nicholas Georgescu-Roegen on "The Entropy Law and the Economic Problem".
- Preston Cloud on mineral resources.
- Paul R. Ehrlich and John Holdren on population.
- Leon R. Kass on bioethics.
- Kenneth E. Boulding on the "Economics of the Coming Spaceship Earth".
- Garrett Hardin's 1968 article "The Tragedy of the Commons."
- Herman Daly on the steady-state economy, and the essay, "Electric power, employment, and economic growth: a case study in growthmania."
- Warren A. Johnson on the guaranteed income as an environmental measure.
- Richard England and Barry Bluestone on ecology and social conflict.
- E. F. Schumacher on Small Is Beautiful, title of his book, also published in 1973.
- Walter A. Weisskopf on economic growth versus existential balance.
- Jørgen Randers and Donella Meadows on the carrying capacity of the environment.
- John B. Cobb on "ecology, ethics, and theology".
- C. S. Lewis on The Abolition of Man, an extract from his 1943 book of the same name.

In his contribution, "Leviathan or Oblivion?", Ophuls wrote on the political and economical implications of environmental problems. His main argument was that "because of the tragedy of the commons, environmental problems cannot be solved through cooperation...and the rationale for government with major coercive powers is overwhelming." According to Ophuls "reforming a corrupt people is a Herculean task," which only leaves us with the choice of becoming a leviathan or oblivion.

Eckersley (1992) argued that, "...although Ophuls has since moderated his position by placing a greater emphasis on the need for self restraint than on the need for external coercion, he continues to maintain that the latter must be resorted to if calls for the former are unsuccessful."

=== Democratic challenges to address environmental problems ===
In the 1970s, Ophuls commented on the role of liberal democracies in addressing environmental problems. The relation between politics and the environment is complex. Climate change is slow, relative to political cycles of leadership in electoral democracies, which impedes responses by politicians who are elected and re-elected on much shorter timescales.

Effectively responding to global warming necessitates some form of international environmental governance to achieve shared targets related to energy consumption and environmental usage. Climate change complicates political ideology and practice, affecting conceptions of responsibility for future societies as well as economic systems. Material inequality between nations make technological solutions insufficient for climate change mitigation. Rather, political solutions can navigate the particularities of various facets of environmental crisis. Climate change mitigation strategies can be at odds with democratic priorities of prosperity, progress, and state sovereignty, and instead underscore a collective relationship with the environment.

The international political community is presently based on liberal principles that prioritize individual freedoms and capitalist systems that make quick and ambitious climate responses difficult. Interest-group liberalism is guided by individual human priorities. Groups unable to voice their self-interest, such as minorities without suffrage, or non-humans, are not included in the political compromise. Addressing environmental crises can be impeded when citizens of liberal democracies do not see environmental problems as impacting their lives, or when they lack the education to evaluate the importance of the problem. The human benefits from environmental exploitation and protection compete. Considering the implications of ecological degradation for future human generations can give environmental concerns a basis in anthropocentric liberal democratic politics.

Ophuls (1977) posits that liberal democracies are unfit to address environmental problems, and that the prioritization of these challenges would involve a transition to more authoritarian forms of government. Others counter this by pointing to the past successes of environmental reform movements to improve water and air quality in liberal societies. In practice, environmentalism can improve democracy rather than necessitate its end, by expanding democratic participation and promoting political innovations.

=== Ecology and the politics of scarcity, 1977 ===
In the preface of his 1977 book Ecology and the Politics of Scarcity, Ophuls declared the intention of his work:

This work is designed to show that American political values and institutions are grossly maladapted to the era of ecological scarcity that has already begun. It is thus almost entirely a critique. Of course, certain general political principles that will probably have to form the basis of our community life in this new era appear to emerge naturally from the critique, and the concluding chapter discusses these. Nevertheless, I make no systematic effort too provide institutional answers or to deal with the problem of implementing a radically different set of political values.

Furthermore Ophuls argued, that

... virtually all the philosophies, values, and institutions typical of modern society are the luxuriant fruit of an era of apparently endless abundance. The return of scarcity in any guise therefore represents a serious challenge to the modern way of life.

Ophuls is skeptical about the ability to anticipate a sustainable society, or steady state society. He claimed:

Our ability to achieve the requisite level of effectiveness in planning is especially doubtful. Already the complex systems that sustain industrial civilization are seen by some as perpetually hovering on the brink of breakdown; the computer and other panaceas for coping with complexity appear to have been vastly oversold; and current management styles - linear, hierarchical, economic - appear to be grossly ill adapted to the nature of the problem.... there are no technical solutions to the dilemmas of environmental management, and policy decisions about environmental problems must be made politically by prudent men, not by scientific administrators. This being the case, technology assessment, the remedy proposed for the general political problem of technological side effects, can never be the purely technical exercise many of its proponents seem to envision; instead, the planning process will come to resemble a power struggle between partisans of differing economic, social, and political values.

Ophuls concludes that premature specificity of the steady-state society and its required institutions can be counterproductive:

... In short, excessive or premature specificity about the institutions of the steady-state society is either not very useful or a positive hindrance; again, metanoia is the key, for it will almost automatically engender concrete, practical arrangements that are congruent with it. Nevertheless, a general outline of a solution to the problems of ecological scarcity is implicit in the concept of the steady state. Let us therefore review the essential characteristics of a steady-state society.

=== Plato's Revenge: Politics in the Age of Ecology, 2011 ===
In his 2011 book Plato's Revenge: Politics in the Age of Ecology, Ophuls starts with the premise that "sustainability is impossible". He argues that "we are on an industrial Titanic, fueled by rapidly depleting stocks of fossil hydrocarbons.... we are headed for a postindustrial future that, however technologically sophisticated, will resemble the pre-industrial past in many important respects."

In the end, the work is a plea for "an essentially Platonic politics of consciousness dedicated to inner cultivation rather than outward expansion and the pursuit of perpetual growth. We would then achieve a way of life that is materially and institutionally simple but culturally and spiritually rich, one in which humanity flourishes in harmony with nature."

== Reception ==
In response to the 2011 publication of Plato's Revenge, Thomas Homer-Dixon wrote the following endorsement:

For decades, William Ophuls has been among the world's most original thinkers about the implications of our global ecological crisis for freedom, democracy, and political order. In Plato's Revenge, he goes to the essence of this crisis: the deep, tacit, and widespread beliefs that nature and society are nothing more than machines, that the state should play no role in cultivating citizens' virtue, and that self-interested individuals should rely solely on reason to guide their lives. Ophuls weaves together the ideas of some of history's greatest thinkers to argue that humankind's future lies in small, simple republics that cultivate their citizens' virtue through natural law. In doing so, he shreds conventional wisdom and invigorates our conversation about the kind of world we intend our grandchildren to inherit.

Robert Paehlke described Ophuls' work as attempt "to rethink how present and future societies might be organized given the array of environmental and sustainability challenges that we face."

== Selected bibliography ==
- Ecology and the Politics of Scarcity: Prologue to a Political Theory of the Steady State, (W. H. Freeman & Co., 1977)
- (w/ A. Stephen Boyan, Jr.) Ecology and the Politics of Scarcity Revisited: The Unraveling of the American Dream, 1992.
- Requiem For Modern Politics: The Tragedy Of The Enlightenment And The Challenge Of The New Millennium, (hardcover: Westview Press, 1997; paperback: Routledge, 1998 ISBN 9780813335162; ebook: Routledge, 2019)
- Plato's Revenge: Politics in the Age of Ecology, (MIT Press, 2011)
- Immoderate Greatness: Why Civilizations Fail, (CreateSpace, 2012)
- Sane Polity: A Pattern Language, (CreateSpace, 2013)
- Apologies to the Grandchildren: Reflections on Our Ecological Predicament, Its Deeper Causes, and Its Political Consequences, (Independently published, 2018)
- Electrifying the Titanic: The Shipwreck of Industrial Civilisation, (Independently published, 2021) ISBN 979-8754839793
- The Tragedy of Industrial Civilization: Envisioning a Political Future, (Independently published, 2023)
