= A\J: Alternatives Journal =

- Interim Publisher: David Mcconachie
- Former editors: Robert Gibson, Nicola Ross, Eric Rumble
- Categories: Environmental
- Frequency: Bimonthly
- Circulation: 5,000
- Founder: Robert C. Paehlke
- First issue: July 4, 1971
- Company: Alternatives Inc., a registered charity
- Country: Canada
- Based in: Kitchener, Ontario
- Language: English
- Website: www.alternativesjournal.ca
- ISSN: 1205-7398

A\J: Alternatives Journal is a not-for-profit environmental magazine and website based in Waterloo, Ontario, Canada. It is the national Canadian magazine exploring environmental science, issues, policy and debate, and has been the official publication of the Environmental Studies Association of Canada since 1995. The publication has touted itself as a journal/magazine hybrid, providing scholarly researched and peer-reviewed articles alongside articles with broader appeal such as interviews. David McConachie is the publication's editor.

It is a Canadian Registered Charity.

== History ==
A\J has been in publication since 1971, when it was established by Robert A. Paehlke. It was originally produced in Peterborough, Ontario at Trent University, when issues of the environment were just beginning to make their way into Canadian public consciousness. In 1984 the journal moved its home base to the University of Waterloo; it has since moved to The B-box Co-working Space, at 204a-283 Duke Street W.
