= Robert C. Paehlke =

American Canadian political scientist, environmentalist

Robert C. Paehlke (born 1941) is an American Canadian political scientist, environmentalist, Emeritus Professor of Environmental and Resource Studies and Political Science at Trent University, Canada, and author, best known for his work on environmentalism and progressive politics.

== Biography ==
Paehlke studied political science obtaining his BA from Lehigh University, his MA from The New School for Social Research, and his PhD from the University of British Columbia. He has spent his academic career at the Trent University, Canada. He was Professor and Chair in its Environmental and Resource Studies Program, and taught environmental policy and politics for 35 years from 1970 to 2005.

Paehlke wrote several books, such as Democracy’s Dilemma, Conservation and Environmentalism, and Environmentalism and the Future of Progressive Politics. In 1971 he was founding editor of the journal Alternatives: Canadian Ideas and Action.

In 1989 Paehlke still believed, that "environmentalism as an ideology is now at a stage of development comparable to that of socialism a century ago. Environmentalism may never obtain a mass base similar to that of conservatism, liberalism, or socialism, but it has already transformed the way many people understand the political world."

== Publications ==
- Paehlke, Robert C. Environmentalism and the future of progressive politics. New Haven (1989).
- Paehlke, Robert C. Conservation and environmentalism : an encyclopedia. 1st ed. 1995; Routledge, 3 April 2013.
- Paehlke, Robert C. Democracy's dilemma: environment, social equity, and the global economy. MIT Press, 2004.
- Robert Paehlke, Douglas Torgerson. Managing Leviathan : environmental politics and the administrative state. 2005.
- Paehlke, Robert C. Some like it cold: the politics of climate change in Canada. Between the Lines, 2008.
- Paehlke, Robert C. "Environmental values and public policy." Environmental Policy 4.2 (2000): 77–97.
