= European environmental research and innovation policy =

The European environmental research and innovation policy is a set of strategies, actions and programmes to promote more and better research and innovation for building a resource-efficient and climate resilient society and economy in sync with the natural environment. It is based on the Europe 2020 strategy for a smart, sustainable and inclusive economy and it realises the European Research Area (ERA) and Innovation Union in the field of environment. The aim of the European environmental research and innovation policy is to contribute to a transformative agenda for Europe in the coming years, where the quality of life of the citizens and the environment are steadily improved, in sync with the competitiveness of businesses, the societal inclusion and the management of resources.

== Main features ==
The European environmental research and innovation policy has a multidisciplinary character and involve efforts across many different sectors to provide safe, economically feasible, environmentally sound and socially acceptable solutions along the entire value chain of human activities. To reduce resource use and environmental impacts whilst increasing competitiveness requires a decisive societal and technological transition to an economy based on a sustainable relationship between nature and human well-being. The availability of sufficient raw materials is addressed as well as the creation of opportunities for growth and new jobs. Innovative options are developed in policies ranging across science, technology, economy, regulations, society and citizens’ behavior, and governance. Research and innovation activities improve the understanding and forecasting of climate and environmental change in a systemic and cross-sectoral perspective, reduce uncertainties, identify and assess vulnerabilities, risks, costs, mitigation measures and opportunities, as well as expand the range and improve the effectiveness of societal and policy responses and solutions.

== International context ==
The European environmental research and innovation policy was placed in the context of the process at the United Nations to develop a set of Sustainable Development Goals (SDGs) that were agreed at the Rio+20 Conference on Sustainable development in 2012 and are now integrated into the United Nations development agenda beyond 2015. These goals have succeeded the Millennium Development Goals and are universally applicable to all Nations, hence also to the European Union and its Member States.

== Implementation through Framework Programmes ==
The implementation of the European environmental research and innovation policy relies on a systemic approach to innovation for a system-wide transformation. For large extent, it is carried out through the Framework Programmes for Research and Technological Development.

The current Framework Programme is called Horizon 2020 and environmental research and innovation is envisaged across the entire programme with an interdisciplinary approach. Current price estimates suggest that more than 6,5 € billion per year could be made available for activities related to sustainable development during the duration of Horizon 2020, addressing both research and innovation differently from previous FPs. Horizon 2020 is open to cooperation with researchers and innovators world-wide in order to foster co-design and co-creation of solutions that may have a global impact.

New calls for research and innovation proposals have been opened on 14 October 2015. Information is contained in the Horizon 2020 participant portal.
