= Interest group liberalism =

Interest group liberalism is Theodore Lowi's term for the clientelism resulting from the broad expansion of public programs in the United States, including those programs which were part of the "Great Society."

Lowi's seminal book, first published in 1969, was titled The End of Liberalism, and presented a critique of the role of interest groups in American government, arguing that "any group representing anything at all, is dealt with and judged according to the political resources it brings to the table and not for the moral or rationalist strength of its interest." Lowi's critique stood out in sharp contrast to theories of pluralism, championed by Robert Dahl and others, which argued that interest groups provide competition and a necessary democratic link between people and government.

== See also ==
- Client politics
- Identity politics
- Interest group
