= Moral cleansing theory =

Moral cleansing theory is a concept in social psychology referring to the phenomenon where individuals engage in compensatory moral behaviours to restore their moral self-image after engaging in behaviour perceived as unethical or immoral. This theory suggests that such behaviours, ranging from prosocial acts like charitable giving, to symbolic ones, such as washing one's hands, serve as psychological mechanisms aimed at alleviating guilt and reaffirming an individual's moral identity.

Rooted in moral psychology, the theory explores how moral emotions, such as guilt and shame, interact with self-regulatory processes. It is closely related to other frameworks such as cognitive dissonance theory, which explains how individuals seek to resolve inner conflicts between their actions and beliefs, and moral licensing, where prior moral behaviour provides perceived permission to act immorally at a later stage. Moral cleansing, in contrast, is typically triggered by a threat to the self-concept and involves efforts to restore rather than justify moral standing.

== Background ==
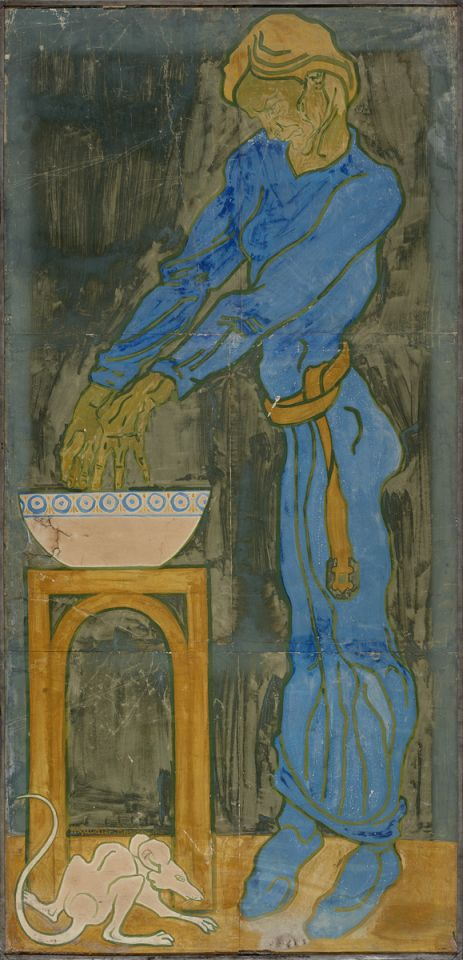
A poster by Henri Gaudier-Brzeska depicting Lady Macbeth attempting to wash her hands.

Moral Cleansing Theory emerged from research in social psychology exploring how individuals respond to threats to their moral self-image. The concept initially gained attention in 2006 following a study by psychologists Chen-Bo Zhong and Katie Liljenquist, who found that recalling unethical behaviour increased participants’ desire for physical cleansing — a phenomenon they termed the Macbeth Effect. Their work highlighted a broader psychological process in which individuals engage in symbolic acts to restore a sense of moral purity following moral transgressions. This marked the beginning of systematic inquiry into moral cleansing as a distinct psychological response.

Although the terminology is relatively recent, the idea of compensating for wrongdoings has deeper roots in moral philosophy and psychology. Earlier frameworks, such as Kohlberg’s stages of moral development, and research into moral emotions like guilt and shame have laid the groundwork for understanding how individuals respond to moral failure. Moral cleansing builds on these traditions by focusing specifically on restorative actions — often symbolic or indirect — that help individuals re-establish their self-concept as moral beings.

Since its introduction, moral cleansing theory has expanded beyond symbolic behaviours. Research has identified a variety of compensatory responses, including prosocial behaviour, restitution, and altered ethical decision-making following experiences of guilt or moral threat.

== Key concepts ==
Human beings are strongly motivated to view themselves as moral and decent. This moral self-concept is shaped and regulated by a range of emotions, particularly guilt, shame, and self-disgust. This arises when individuals perceive that they have violated ethical or social standards. While these emotions are closely related, they serve distinct functions. Guilt usually stems from specific behaviours and motivates reparative actions aimed at others, such as apologising or making amends. Shame, on the other hand, involves a more global negative self-evaluation and often leads to social withdrawal or avoidance. Self-disgust, which is another moral emotion, reflects a sense of internal revulsion that can be triggered by actions that feel deeply inconsistent with one’s values. These emotional responses are not random—they each play an essential self-regulatory role by signalling a disruption in the coherence between one’s actions and internal moral standards.

To manage such moral discomfort, people often engage in behaviours designed to reduce negative emotions and restore their moral equilibrium. This motivation is reflected in broader psychological frameworks such as self-concept maintenance theory, which proposes that individuals strive to preserve a consistent view of themselves as good and virtuous. Similarly, cognitive dissonance theory explains how psychological discomfort arising from a mismatch between beliefs and actions often triggers compensatory strategies aimed at re-establishing internal harmony. In both cases, the underlying idea is that people are motivated not merely to avoid external punishment or shame, but to resolve internal threats to their self-image.

Moral Cleansing Theory emerged from these concepts as a specific mechanism for restoring moral self-integrity after a perceived transgression. Moral cleansing differs from moral licensing, in which prior moral actions give individuals perceived permission to act immorally. In contrast, moral cleansing refers to efforts to restore moral standing following a perceived transgression. These behaviours may take the form of direct restitution, such as making reparative gestures; behavioural compensation, such as helping others in unrelated contexts; or symbolic acts, such as physical cleansing rituals. These are all driven by the need to alleviate moral emotions and reaffirm the self as fundamentally good. In this way, moral cleansing functions as a psychological response that helps individuals navigate the tension between moral ideals and imperfect behaviour.

== Categories ==
Moral cleansing behaviours can be broadly categorised into three overlapping types: restitution, behavioural, and symbolic cleansing. Each involves different strategies through which individuals attempt to restore their moral self-image after a perceived transgression.

=== Restitution Cleansing ===
Restitution cleansing involves direct efforts to repair harm or restore moral standing after immoral or prejudiced behaviour. These actions—such as apologizing, offering restitution, or making reparative gestures—are typically motivated by guilt and aim to address interpersonal harm.

One early demonstration of this phenomenon was conducted by Dutton and Lake, who found that white participants who were led to believe they held prejudices against racial minorities were significantly more likely to donate money to a Black panhandler than those who had not received such feedback. This response was interpreted as a form of moral compensation—a way of reaffirming one’s self-concept as fair and moral.

=== Behavioural Cleansing ===
Behavioural cleansing refers to moral actions undertaken after a perceived moral transgression, even when those actions are not directly related to the wrongdoing itself. Unlike restitution cleansing, which aims to repair specific harm, behavioural cleansing involves more general acts of good deeds that serve to improve one’s self-image as a moral person. Examples include volunteering, helping strangers, or engaging in ethical decision-making after recalling unethical conduct. These behaviours are often motivated by guilt or self-discrepancy and are believed to help "rebalance" one’s moral self-concept.

Studies have shown that individuals experiencing guilt are more likely to be socially cooperative. People who are reminded of their moral shortcomings also tend to behave more ethically in subsequent unrelated situations. These compensatory acts serve as psychological tools to maintain moral equilibrium and reduce the discomfort associated with self-perceived immorality.

=== Symbolic Cleansing ===
Unlike the other two forms of moral cleansing, symbolic cleansing relies completely on metaphorical or physical acts of purification to alleviate moral discomfort. Common examples of this include religious confessions, washing hands and using antiseptic wipes.

One of the most widely cited illustrations of symbolic cleansing is the Macbeth effect, which describes how people who were confronted with their own moral failings became more attracted to physical cleansing. This phenomenon has been supported by multiple studies using scenarios where participants were reminded of unethical acts and subsequently showed increased interest in cleaning products or greater likelihood to engage in cleansing behaviours.

Symbolic cleansing can also occur vicariously—people may experience moral relief by observing someone else engage in cleansing. These effects suggest that physical purity is strongly linked to moral self-perception, even when no direct restitution or behavioural change is involved.

== Research and evidence ==
Empirical support for Moral Cleansing Theory began with the foundational study by Zhong and Liljenquist in 2006, who coined the term Macbeth Effect to describe the increased desire for physical cleansing after recalling unethical behaviour. In their experiments, participants who wrote about a past immoral act were significantly more likely to choose antiseptic wipes over other products, suggesting that physical cleansing symbolically helped restore their moral self-image.

One study found that participants who were led to believe they had made prejudiced decisions against a Black applicant later donated more money to a Black charity, suggesting a form of restitutional moral compensation. Similarly, another study found that reminding participants of their moral values reduced the likelihood of cleansing behaviour, implying that affirming one’s moral identity through other means can satisfy the same psychological need.

Behavioural cleansing has also been observed in the form of increased prosocial behaviour. For example, one study demonstrated that when individuals are confronted with taboo trade-offs—such as weighing human life against monetary gain—they often react with moral outrage and discomfort, which can elicit compensatory moral behaviours aimed at reaffirming their moral identity. This can include increased endorsement of prosocial causes or actions that symbolically distance them from the perceived moral violation. The findings support the notion that exposure to morally contaminating decisions can provoke efforts to restore a sense of moral integrity through outward, socially valued behaviours.

Another experiment on symbolic cleansing demonstrated that it may be localized to the body part involved in the immoral action. Participants who committed an unethical act using their hands (such as typing and sending a deceptive email) showed a greater preference for hand sanitizer, whereas those who lied verbally over the phone preferred mouthwash. This suggests an unconscious motivation to cleanse the specific body part associated with the immoral behaviour.

Further research found that priming individuals with a sense of physical cleanliness can also lead to harsher moral judgments on ambiguous social issues. This effect is mediated by an inflated moral self-image, suggesting that feeling physically clean enhances one’s perception of moral purity and licenses stricter evaluations of others. Such findings highlight the complex role of physical cleanliness in moral regulation, where a clean self not only shifts one’s moral self-perception but may also justify harsher criticism of others, potentially contributing to social exclusion based on perceived moral differences.

== Criticism and limitations ==
Research on the Macbeth Effect has faced scrutiny regarding its replicability and theoretical robustness. Several replication attempts have failed to reproduce the original findings despite including larger, more diverse sample sizes, suggesting that some effects may be context-dependent or influenced by methodological factors. A meta-analysis of studies on moral cleansing found that while there is some evidence for the phenomenon, results are often inconsistent and may not generalise beyond the original study conditions. Further concerns include publication bias and the lack of consistent effects when studies are conducted by independent research teams. As a result, researchers have called for more rigorous methodologies, such as preregistered designs and larger, cross-cultural samples, to clarify when and how moral cleansing occurs.

== Applications ==
In environmental psychology, moral cleansing mechanisms have been linked to sustainability behaviour. For example, one study found that participants who recalled a past immoral act were more likely to express support for environmental initiatives, suggesting that moral threat can motivate symbolic prosocial behaviours. This may offer future avenues for promoting environmental engagement by exploring how moral framing or guilt-based prompts could be used to encourage sustainable choices.

The concept of moral cleansing has also informed understanding of moral judgement and prejudice. Some researchers argue that enhancing one’s moral self-image through physical or symbolic cleansing may unintentionally lead to harsher moral evaluations of others, which has implications for social judgement and intergroup relations.

== See also ==
- Social psychology
- Self-licensing
- Lady Macbeth effect
- Self-serving bias
- Self-image
- Social identity theory
- Self-concept
- Cognitive dissonance
- Moral emotions
- Morality
