= Energy supply =

Delivery of fuels to point of use

Energy supply is the delivery of fuels or transformed fuels to point of consumption. It potentially encompasses the extraction, transmission, generation, distribution and storage of fuels. It is also sometimes called energy flow.

This supply of energy can be disrupted by several factors, including imposition of higher energy prices due to action by OPEC or other cartel, war, political disputes, economic disputes, or physical damage to the energy infrastructure due to terrorism. The security of the energy supply is a major concern of national security and energy law.

== Other uses ==
New York Consolidated Laws includes a statutory code called "Energy Law". Article 21 of this code is called "Energy Supply and Production", but rather than a comprehensive code, only consists of one section dealing with renewable energy.

== See also ==
=== General energy topics ===
- Energy
- Energy form
- Energy conservation
- Energy density
- Energy economics
- Energy law
- Energy markets and energy derivatives
- Energy policy
- Energy price
- Energy security
- Energy quality
- Entropy (energy dispersal) and Introduction to entropy
- List of energy topics
- Market transformation
- World energy consumption
- Worldwide energy supply

=== Renewable and alternative energy sources ===
- Clean Tech Nation
- Effects of 2000s energy crisis
- Efficient energy use
- Geothermal power
- Global warming
- Intermittent power source
- Ocean energy
- Renewable energy
- Renewable energy commercialization
- Renewable heat
- Vehicle-to-grid
- Wind power

=== By country ===
- Japan
- United Kingdom
- United States

== Other sources ==
- Lisa Yount, Energy supply: Library in a book (Infobase Publishing, 2005) ISBN 978-0-8160-5577-7 Found at Google Books.
- Jon Strand, Energy efficiency and renewable energy supply for the G-7 countries, with emphasis on Germany, Issues 2007–2299, Volumes 7-299 of IMF working paper(International Monetary Fund, 2007) Found at Google Books.
- Herberg, Mikkal (2014). Energy Security and the Asia-Pacific: Course Reader. United States: The National Bureau of Asian Research.
- Ewan McLeish, Challenges to Our Energy Supply: Can the Earth Survive? (The Rosen Publishing Group, 2009) ISBN 978-1-4358-5357-7 Found at Google Books.
