= Porcello =

Porcello is an Italian surname. Notable people with the surname include:

- Massimilian Porcello (born 1980), German-Italian football (soccer) player
- Rick Porcello (born 1988), American baseball player
- Sam Porcello (1935/36–2012), American food scientist
