= World Energy Engineering Congress =

The World Energy Engineering Congress (WEEC) is an international energy industry conference and exposition hosted annually by the Association of Energy Engineers.

Professionals in the field of energy engineering from around the world convene annually at the WEEC to discuss energy-related issues and technology such as:

- Energy efficiency and energy management
- Renewable, green, and alternative energy
- Combined heat and power, cogeneration, and distributed generation
- Integrated building automation and energy management
- Lighting efficiency
- HVAC systems and controls
- Thermal storage and load management
- Boilers and combustion controls
- Geoexchange technologies
- Solar and fuel cell technologies
- Applications specific to federal emergency management programs
- Energy services and project financing
