= Certified measurement and verification professional =

Certified measurement and verification professional (CMVP) is an accreditation from the Association of Energy Engineers (AEE) awarded to qualified professionals in the field of measurement and verification (M&V) within the energy industry. Its aim is to acknowledge good practice and raise overall professional standards within the M&V field worldwide.

The right to use the CMVP post-nominal is granted to those who demonstrate proficiency in M&V by passing a 4-hour written exam and meeting the required academic and practical qualifications.
