= SnackWell's =

American food company

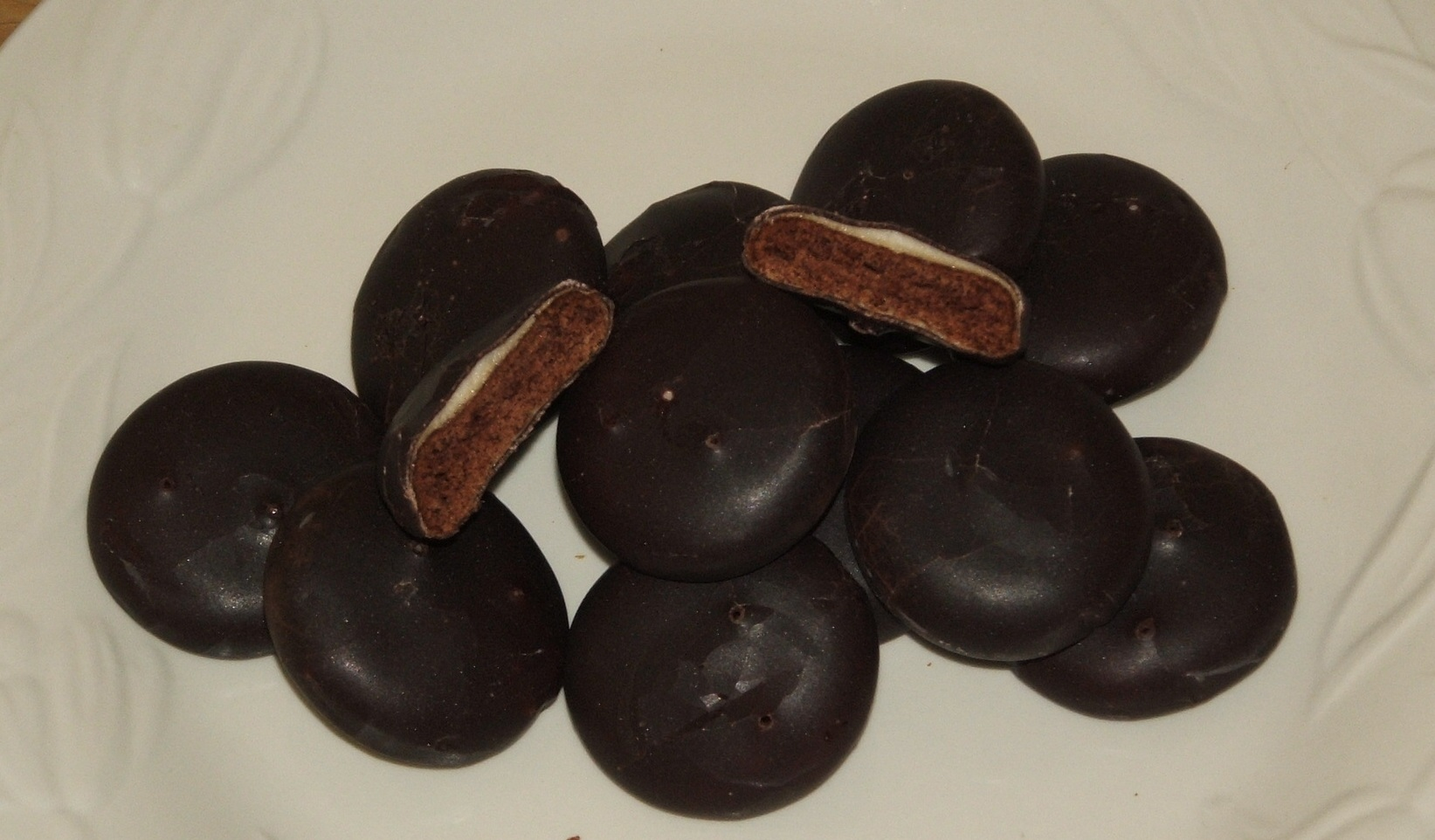
Snackwell's Devils Food cookies

SnackWell's was an American brand of foods that was introduced in 1992. Its products used to include fat-free cookies of a variety of flavors including creme, shortbread, and devil's food cake. Previously a Nabisco brand, it was later sold to Back to Nature Foods. In 2022, the SnackWell's brand was retired.

== History ==
=== Under Nabisco ===
SnackWell's products were marketed as fat-free and thus healthier snacks, as the U.S. dietary guidelines of the early 1990s advocated a reduction in the consumption of fats. In an ironic and unintended consequence, SnackWell's products were an example of foods that had a higher carbohydrate count and were later cited as a likely contributor to the obesity epidemic of the 1990s and beyond.

The Snackwell Effect was named for the tendency to consume greater quantities of an item or service deemed morally superior, such as a putatively healthier cookie, or more energy-efficient lighting.

SnackWell's were developed by Nabisco's principal food scientist, Sam Porcello.

=== Back to Nature ===
SnackWell's-branded products were made by Back to Nature Foods in Naples, Florida. In Canada, SnackWell's potato chips and crackers were available.

In August 2017, it was reported that B&G Foods Inc. had agreed to buy SnackWell's cookies and Back to Nature granola for $162.5 million. As of May 2019, SnackWell's Devil's Food Cookie Cakes were no longer "fat free" as they contained 3 grams of fat per serving and they were advertised as having an improved formula.

== See also ==
- SnackWell effect
