= Measurement and verification =

Measurement and verification (M&V) is the term given to the process for quantifying savings delivered by an Energy Conservation Measure (ECM), as well as the sub-sector of the energy industry involved with this practice.

Measurement and verification demonstrates how much energy the ECM has avoided using, rather than the total cost saved. The latter can be affected by many factors, such as energy prices. The measurement and verification process enables the energy savings delivered by the ECM to be isolated and fairly evaluated.

Various protocols for good practice in measurement and verification exist, including the International Performance Measurement and Verification Protocol (IPMVP), which defines common terminology and the key steps in implementing a robust M&V process.

A key part of the M&V process is the development of an M&V plan, which defines how the savings analysis will be conducted before the ECM is implemented. This provides a degree of objectivity that is absent if the savings are simply evaluated after implementation.
