= SnackWell effect =

Phenomenon among dieters

The SnackWell effect is a phenomenon whereby dieters will eat more low-calorie cookies, such as SnackWell's, than they otherwise would for normal cookies. Also known as moral license, it is also described as a term for the way people go overboard once they are given a free pass or the tendency of people to overconsume when eating more of low-fat food due to the belief that it is not fattening.

The term, which emerged as a reaction to dietary trends in the 1980s and 1990s, is also used for similar effects in other settings, such as energy consumption, where it is termed the "rebound effect". For example, according to a 2008 study, people with energy-efficient washing machines wash more clothes. People with energy-efficient lights leave them on longer, and lose 5–12% of the expected energy savings of 80%.

== See also ==
- Induced demand
- Jevons paradox
- Parkinson's law
- Risk compensation
