= Noble cause corruption =

Illegal or unethical conduct done for the perceived greater good

Noble cause corruption is corruption caused by the adherence to a teleological ethical system, suggesting that people will use unethical or illegal means to attain desirable goals, a result which appears to benefit the greater good. Where traditional corruption is defined by personal gain, noble cause corruption forms when someone is convinced of their righteousness, and will do anything within their powers to achieve the desired result. An example of noble cause corruption is police misconduct "committed in the name of good ends", or neglect of due process through "a moral commitment to make the world a safer place to live". The knowing misconduct by a law enforcement officer or prosecutor with the goal of attaining what the officer believes is a "just" result. Conditions for such corruption usually occur where individuals feel no administrative accountability and lose faith in the criminal justice system. These conditions can be compounded by arrogance and weak supervision.

== Origin ==
In 1983, Carl Klockars used the film Dirty Harry as an example of the kinds of circumstances that seemed to justify what later became known as noble cause corruption. Within the story, three central actions are instances of noble cause corruption: illegal entry, torture, and murder. Klockars believed that this problem, which he dubbed "the Dirty Harry problem", was a chief consideration of police work. He details how officers occasionally face problems in which they have to select between competing ethical codes. Often the choice is between legal means (which he dubs "clean means"), which can allow dangerous offenders to go free, or extralegal means (which he dubs "dirty means"), which entails breaking the law to prevent truly dangerous offenders from committing additional crimes.

In 1989, the term "noble cause corruption" was coined by Edwin Delattre. He was troubled that police officers might conceive of a goal or outcome that justified the use of questionable means, in particular, the use of force to obtain confessions. He argued that "some ways of acting were unacceptable no matter how noble the end." From Delattre's work, the noble cause has emerged as a problem for the utilitarian commitment to outcomes, because it permits a society to be protected through aggressive and illegal policing tactics.

== In policing ==
In Police Ethics, it is argued that some of the best officers are often the most susceptible to noble cause corruption. According to professional policing literature, noble cause corruption includes "planting or fabricating evidence, lying or the fabrication and manipulation of facts on reports or through testimony in court, and generally abusing police authority to make a charge stick."

According to Robert Reiner, a professor at the London School of Economics, stops based on statistical discrimination are also a form of noble cause corruption.

=== Luna v. Massachusetts ===
On 17 February 1988, officers from the Boston Police Department executed a search warrant at the home of Albert Lewin. As they entered the premises, Lewin shot and killed Officer Sherman Griffiths. Lewin was charged with murder, but charges were later dismissed when it was discovered that the affidavit for search warrant filed by Detective Carlos A. Luna was based upon false information and a fictitious informant. Luna was indicted for perjury, conspiracy and filing false police reports while all the charges against Lewin, including the murder of a police officer, were dismissed. The case outlines consequences of noble cause motivations when officers ignore the Constitution and fabricate evidence in the pursuit of justice.

=== Lawyer X & the Victoria Police ===
In Victoria, Australia the Victoria Police's use of Nicola Gobbo, a lawyer favored by organized crime figures, to secretly inform on them, was referred to as noble cause corruption following a 2018 Royal Commission. While the Victoria Police admitted to wrongdoing and issued an apology, it denied claims of noble cause corruption. The Guardian reported that the Commission found that "the failure rested in a culture where the ends justified the means, even if the means put public trust in policing and the justice system as a whole at risk." The Commission reported that in the four years following 2005, Gobbo's informing on suspected persons was "almost on an industrial scale", was in breach of lawyer-client privilege and ultimately jeopardized convictions linked to over 1,000 people. The Victoria Police's covert use of Gobbo as a source may have denied the accused the right to a fair hearing and resulted in the miscarriage of justice. As of 2021, some convictions made following her informing have been overturned.

== In business ==
In 2003 Elizabeth Holmes founded the biotechnology company Theranos with the goal of developing a compact clinical blood testing machine that would perform multiple diagnostic tests from a single finger-prick of blood. When the Theranos machines failed to work as expected, Holmes misrepresented the results to her investors. She claimed that the technology had been approved by the FDA, was in use by the US military and Johns Hopkins Medicine, and entered into a contract with Walgreens. In actuality the lab testing was performed on other manufacturer's machines. Blood samples were diluted in order to run on the traditional machines and nearly one million tests had to be invalidated. US prosecutors filed criminal charges against Holmes for defrauding investors, doctors, and patients. John Carreyrou stated "... she ultimately believed that what she was going to achieve once she got there was gonna be a good thing for humanity. Therefore, every lie and every corner she cut along the way was justified."

== In popular culture ==
In his 2012 documentary film Mea Maxima Culpa: Silence in the House of God, Alex Gibney describes the defense of Father Lawrence Murphy, a serial sexual abuser at a school for the deaf, as "noble cause corruption", in that "he attempts to spin his abuse into a holy act, casting molestation as a form of sacrament."

Within the 2013 documentary film We Steal Secrets: The Story of WikiLeaks, journalist James Ball suggests Julian Assange has developed noble cause corruption, arguing that he is "unable to recognize when he does things that he would deplore in others".

Elizabeth Holmes, who founded Theranos and was eventually indicted of fraud, was described as having displayed noble cause corruption by Wall St. Journal author John Carreyrou in his book Bad Blood: Secrets and Lies in a Silicon Valley Startup.

== See also ==
- Frontier justice
- Police corruption
- Police misconduct
- Self-licensing
- Vigilantism
