= International performance measurement and verification protocol =

Standard for quantifying the results of energy efficiency investments

The International Performance Measurement and Verification Protocol (IPMVP®) defines standard terms and suggests best practise for quantifying the results of energy efficiency investments and increase investment in energy and water efficiency, demand management and renewable energy projects. The IPMVP was developed by a coalition of international organizations (led by the United States Department of Energy) starting in 1994–1995. The Protocol has become the national measurement and verification standard in the United States and many other countries, and has been translated into 10 languages. IPMVP is published in three volumes, most widely downloaded and translated is IPMVP Volume 1 Concepts and Options for Determining Energy and Water Savings. A major driving force was the need for a common protocol to verify savings claimed by Energy Service Companies (ESCOs) implementing Energy Conservation Measures (ECM). The protocol is a framework to determine water and energy savings associated with ECMs.

== History ==
IPMVP has existed in various forms since 1995 when a version of the protocol entitled North American Energy Measurement and Verification Protocol was published. This has been updated and expanded several times since then and in 2001 IPMVP Inc. was formed as an independent non-profit corporation in order to include the international community. Greg Kats served as the Founding Chair of the IPMVP committee from 1994 through 2001. In 2004 IPMVP Inc. changed its name to Efficiency Valuation Organization. The use of IPMVP is now widespread amongst ESCOs, utilities, governments and financial institutions around the world.

== Purpose ==
The purpose of the IPMVP is to increase certainty, reliability, and level of savings; reduce transaction costs by providing an international, industry consensus approach and methodologies; reduce financing costs by providing a project with a Measurement and Verification Plan (M&V Plan) standardisation, thereby allowing project bundling and pooled project financing. It aims to provide a basis for demonstrating emission reduction and delivering enhanced environmental quality; also to provide a basis for negotiating the contractual terms to ensure that an energy efficiency project achieves or exceeds its goals of saving money and improving energy efficiency. The Efficiency Valuation Organization also provides training in Measurement and Verification via a network of national and international training partner organizations.

== Options ==
IPMVP provides four options for determining savings (A, B, C and D). The choice among the options involves many considerations. The selection of an IPMVP option is the decision of the designer of the M&V programme for each project. These options are summarised below:

=== Option (A) Retrofit Isolation: Key Parameter Measurement ===
Savings are determined by field measurement of the key performance parameter(s) which define the energy use of the energy conservation measure's (ECM) affected system(s) and/or the success of the project. Parameters not selected for field measurement are estimated. Estimates can be based on historical data, manufacturer's specifications, or engineering judgment. Documentation of the source or justification of the estimated parameter is required.

Typical applications may include a lighting retrofit, where the power drawn can be monitored and hours of operation can be estimated.

=== Option (B) Retrofit Isolation: All Parameter Measurement ===
Savings are determined by field measurement of all key performance parameters which define the energy use of the ECM-affected system.

Typical applications may include a lighting retrofit where both power drawn and hours of operation are recorded.

=== Option (C) Whole Facility ===
Savings are determined by measuring energy use at the whole facility or sub-facility level. This approach is likely to require a regression analysis or similar to account for independent variables such as outdoor air temperature, for example.

Typical examples may include measurement of a facility where several ECMs have been implemented, or where the ECM is expected to affect all equipment in a facility.

=== Option (D) Calibrated Simulation ===
Savings are determined through simulation of the energy use of the whole facility, or of a sub-facility. Simulation routines are demonstrated to adequately model actual energy performance measured in the facility. This Option usually requires considerable skill in calibrated simulation.

Typical applications may include measurement of a facility where several ECMs have been implemented, but no historical energy data is available.

== IPMVP Software Tools ==
While teams of energy engineers have managed IPMVP projects largely through Excel spreadsheets, recently there has been the shift towards online software tools and platforms. The goal is to facilitate the import of independent variables such as heating and cooling degree days, the creation of energy baseline, the identification of correlations and regression models for the automation of measurement and verification practices.

The most common source of energy data for energy baseline calculation is utility invoices. Some software allow to extract the energy data directly from the pdf of the utility invoices, allowing to speed up the process considerably.

Other tools emerge that allow easy production of adjustment models and more easily taking into account changes in static factors.
