= Gregory Kats =

American businessman

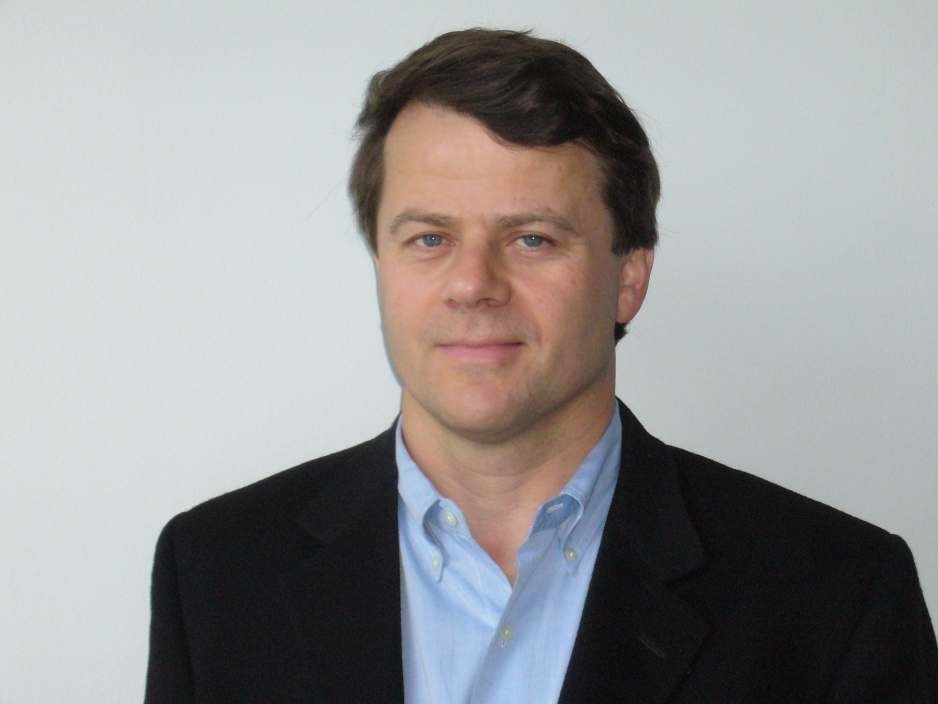
- Kats in 2002
- Born: July 14, 1959 (age 67); Paris, France
- Occupations: Venture Capital, Clean Technology
- Known for: Green Building, Energy Efficiency, Low Carbon Economy, Green Design Standards

Gregory H. Kats (born July 14, 1959) is an American businessman, environmentalist, and thought leader in the green economy sector. He is founder and CEO of the Smart Surfaces Coalition, a non-profit organization consisting of 40+ national and international partner groups working to ensure the rapid, cost-effective adoption of reflective, porous, and green urban surface infrastructure, or "smart surfaces", in cities. Previously, Kats served as a Managing Director at Good Energies,^{[2]} a multi-billion dollar global clean energy investor, and Director of Financing for Energy Efficiency and Renewable Energy at the U.S. Department of Energy (DOE).^{[3]}

== Work ==
Kats has played lead roles in developing the energy efficiency and green building industries, and is a long-time thought leader, innovator, and investor in the transition to a low-carbon economy. A pioneer in the space, Kats led the creation of the International Performance Measurement and Verification Protocol (IPMVP); served as a key driver in the creation of Leadership in Energy and Environmental Design (LEED) certification and subsequent updates; and co-founded the country's first green bank.

In 2019, Kats founded and currently serves as CEO of the Smart Surfaces Coalition (SSC), a 501c(3) organization with over 40 national and international partners including the American Public Health Association, National League of Cities, American Institute of Architects, and the U.S. Green Building Council, among others. The mission of the Smart Surfaces Coalition is as follows: "The Smart Surfaces Coalition is committed to the rapid, cost-effective global adoption of Smart Surfaces to enable cities to thrive despite climate threats, save cities billions of dollars, create jobs, decrease heat, reduce flood risk, slow global warming, and improve city livability, health, and equity." Through the Cities for Smart Surfaces initiative, SSC is partnering with 10 major cities across the U.S. including Boston, Dallas, and Phoenix to facilitate the adoption of Smart Surfaces at the metropolitan level and working with communities in those regions to support community-led, local Smart Surface implementation projects. SSC is also working in Bhopal and Indore, India with funding from the MacArthur Foundation, which they received in 2021.

Kats is also President of Capital E, which works with cities, corporations, and financial institutions to design, scale, and implement clean energy and low carbon strategies. Capital E invests in early-stage clean tech and green firms. Kats is presently a driver in the campaign to revise LEED standards to require meaningful minimum carbon reductions for each level of LEED certification – both for new LEED buildings and for LEED rating renewals. In 2018, he served as the lead author of a major report on the opportunity that cities have to invest in "smart surface technologies" as a means of both improving public health and delivering financial benefits.

Kats chairs the Congressionally established committee guiding the greening of 430,000 federal buildings, serves on the Mayor's Green Ribbon Committee guiding the greening of the District of Columbia, and served on the CO2toEE project steering committee. He is the author of Greening Our Built World, which was translated into Portuguese, and has published several dozen reports and articles in global journals and outlets (see Publications below).

Kats has served on the boards of a dozen clean energy companies including Blue Planet, which produces the first man-made carbon sequestering commercial product which was deployed in the build-out of San Francisco International Airport. Greg also Chaired the development of CarbonStar, a government-backed technical standard for quantifying the carbon intensity of concrete. He regularly testifies on clean energy green building and financial issues.

From 2005 to 2010, Kats was Managing Director of Good Energies, a multibillion-dollar global clean energy PE/VC fund, where he led investments in smart grid, energy efficiency, green materials, and green building. He then served as a partner in Clean Feet, which funds innovative green energy and agricultural projects. Kats also served on a National Academy of Sciences board on strengthening U.S. global competitiveness. He was the Director of Financing for Energy Efficiency and Renewable Energy at the U.S. Department of Energy for five years under President Bill Clinton.

Kats also serves on the advisory board of The CLEEN Project, which compiles and synthesizes clean economy job creation ideas for government leaders, sourced from top executives and policy experts.

In 2022 Greg was recognized as an American Institute of Architects Honorary Member for his contributions to the field. AIA notes that “through his steadfast commitment to green design, Kats has supplied countless architects with the economic evidence to convince clients to embrace sustainability. Without his work, there’s no doubt that architects would face fewer opportunities than they do today.”

== Federal Clean Energy Financing ==
In response to Congressional investigations in 2011 and 2012, Kats testified three times to the U.S. House Committee on Oversight and Government Reform on issues directly related to controversial political issues, including green jobs, including the Obama Administration's federal clean energy strategy, and the DOE loan guarantee controversies, which became issues for candidates in the 2012 United States Presidential Election. His congressional testimony highlighted the cost-effectiveness of clean energy stimulus funding and noted that the final loan default rate of the U.S. clean energy loan program would be less than half what the Office of Management and Budget had projected and budgeted for.

Kats' analysis indicated that the default rate on the $16.1 billion Energy Department loan portfolio is less than 3.6 percent, well below the Office of Management and Budget forecast of 12.85 percent, and he determined that the actual default rate will not get out of single digits. Citing the financial objectives and successes of the program to date, as well as the related employment and national security benefits, Kats concluded that the largest risk is that the DOE slows its loan guarantee program.

== Energy and Green Design Standards ==
While at the U.S. Department of Energy, Kats recognized the challenge associated with enabling energy efficiency to become a more substantial industry. He played a lead role in developing and served as the Founding Chair of IPMVP. During his tenure, he built it into the international energy and water efficiency design and verification standard for more than $50 billion in building efficiency upgrades to date. It's the design measurement verification basis for the modern energy efficiency industry and is required for all federal building efficiency upgrades.

Kats was a founder of the American Council on Renewable Energy (ACORE). He was the Principal Advisor in designing and establishing Enterprise Green Communities, the national low-income green design standard that has served as the design basis for over 50,000 housing units to date. He recently helped design the World Bank's large new green building financing program.

Kats served as a leader in the creation of LEED and served on its steering committee for the first six years. During his tenure on the steering committee, he led the effort to establish minimum energy performance and subsequently led the push to reweight LEED around climate change. He has chaired the USGBC's Energy and Atmosphere Technical Advisory Group on LEED, and served on its LEED Steering Committee. Kats also served as lead advisor in guiding the development of Enterprise Green Comminutes the leading green low income healthy design and certification standard that serves as the design basis for 130,000 units of green healthy affordable housing.

== Resilient Cities ==
For almost a decade, Kats has been driving the conversation about making the built environment – particularly in cities – resilient. In 2018, he co-authored the report, “Delivering Urban Resilience,” which concluded that an investment in “smart surface technologies” would result in an estimated half a trillion dollars in net financial benefits nationally. The report was launched in partnership with the USGBC, National League of Cities, and American Institute of Architects, among others, and has received national attention.

The findings from "Delivering Urban Resilience" highlighted the importance, cost-effectiveness, and feasibility of broad Smart Surface adoption in cities, and in 2019 Kats founded the Smart Surfaces Coalition to further study the impacts of Smart Surface adoption in cities and to provide the tools, training, resources, and other assistance needed for cities to adopt smart surface, resilient infrastructure to better manage the sun and rain which falls on cities. These surfaces include cool/reflective surfaces (roofs, roads, and parking lots), urban trees, green roofs, permeable pavement, and solar PV. As of 2023 the Coalition has over 40 partner organizations with expertise across a range of fields including public health, environmental justice, climate, urban infrastructure, cities, architecture, energy, economics, and finance—among others.

He recently co-authored the report, "Cooling Cities, Slowing Climate Change and Enhancing Equity: Costs and Benefits of Smart Surfaces Adoption for Baltimore," which analyzed the potential of Smart Surfaces to cost-effectively cool the city, cut flooding, mitigate climate change, improve public health, and advance equity. The report found that implementing Smart Surfaces in Baltimore would cut peak summer temperatures by five degrees Fahrenheit or more with a benefit-cost ratio of over 10:1.

In 2014, Kats testified before the Israeli Cabinet about the opportunity for Israel to make large financial savings with health, security and strategic benefits by greening their buildings and infrastructure.^{[14]}

== Awards ==
Kats has been widely recognized for his contributions to the green economy. In 2011, he was the recipient of the first U.S. Green Building Council President's Award, a lifetime achievement honor. Kats also received the Lifetime Achievement Award from the Alliance to Save Energy in 2018 and was recognized as an Honorary Member of the American Institute of Architects in 2022.

== Education ==
Kats earned an MBA from Stanford University and, concurrently, an MPA from Princeton University on a Woodrow Wilson Fellowship. He completed a BA at the University of North Carolina with highest honors as a Morehead Scholar.

== Personal ==
Kats lives with his wife and two of his three children in Washington, DC. A solar PV system powers his home and an electric car.

== Publications ==
- "Greening Our Built World: Costs, Benefits and Strategies"
- "Greening America's Schools: Costs and Benefits"
- "The Costs and Financial Benefits of Green Buildings"
- "Greenhouse warming: Comparative analysis of nuclear and efficiency abatement strategies" Energy Policy Volume 16, Issue 6, December 1988, Pages 538–561
- "The efficiency-renewable synergism" Energy Policy Volume 17, Issue 6, December 1989, Pages 614–616
- "Slowing global warming and sustaining development: The promise of energy efficiency" Energy Policy Volume 18, Issue 1, January–February 1990, Pages 25–33
- "Energy options for Hungary a model for Eastern Europe" Energy Policy Volume 19, Issue 9, November 1991, Pages 855–868
- "The Earth Summit" Energy Policy Volume 20, Issue 6, June 1992, Pages 546–558
- "International greenhouse gas trading programs: a discussion of measurement and accounting issues" Energy Policy Volume 31, Issue 3, February 2003, Pages 211–224
- "Secondary Markets for Energy Efficiency", Energy Efficiency News and Views, May 1995.
- "Energy Efficiency as a Commodity: The Emergence of an Efficiency Secondary Market for Savings in Commercial Buildings”, ACEEE Summer Study Proceedings 1997.
- “The History and Lessons of Creating IPMVP”
- "Achieving High-Performance Federal Facilities: Strategies and Approaches for Transformational Change, Appendix I: The Economics of Sustainability: The Business Case That Makes Itself", The National Academies Press, 2011
- “Life Cycle Cost Analysis Methodologies and Applications of Value Chain-Based Sustainable Design Decision Metrics”, Harvard Real Estate Review, 2017
- “Delivering Urban Resilience” 2018
- "Here's How Cities Can Reduce Climate Change Risk", Risk & Insurance, 2019
- "Cooling Cities, Slowing Climate Change and Enhancing Equity: Costs and Benefits of Smart Surfaces Adoption for Baltimore" 2021
- "LEED Must Lead on Climate", Building Green, 2022
- "We Need Cooler Cities. Here's How to Build Them.", Governing Mag, 2023

== See also ==
- Renewable energy commercialization
- Hermann Scheer
