= Sam Porcello =

American food scientist

- Born: 1935 or 1936; Newark, New Jersey
- Died: 12 May 2012; Toms River, New Jersey
- Occupation: Food scientist

Samuel J. Porcello (1935 or 1936 – May 12, 2012) was an American food scientist who worked at Nabisco for 34 years. He is particularly noted for his work on the modern Oreo cookie. Porcello held five patents directly related to the Oreo. In particular, Porcello was the inventor of one version of the white Oreo cookie creme-filling. He was credited as the inventor of the current recipe in his obituary, but the recipe changed twice in 1997 and 2006 to become kosher and trans-fat-free, respectively. His work earned him the nickname, "Mr. Oreo."

== Early life ==
Porcello was born and raised in Newark, New Jersey. He also lived in Wayne, New Jersey. He and his family moved to Toms River, New Jersey, in 1974, where he resided for the rest of his life. Porcello initially worked as a teacher for a short time during his early career. He then worked for the former Charms Candy Company, a candy manufacturer. He was nearly hired by a major cosmetics company, but his candidacy ended when the company learned that Porcello was color blind.

== Career ==
After his rejection by the cosmetics industry because he was color-blind, Porcello joined Nabisco. When he was hired, Nabisco promised that he could eventually earn a salary of up to $12,000 per year if he was successful. He began his Nabisco career at the company's plant in Fair Lawn, New Jersey. He later worked at Nabisco's corporate headquarters in East Hanover, New Jersey.

Porcello joined Nabisco's research and development department, which develops new lines of snacks. He was considered one of the world's leading experts on cocoa, which is used to make chocolate. He was given the title, "principal scientist," during his career at Nabisco. The Oreo cookie has been sold since 1912, but it was Porcello who invented the modern creme-filling (excluding the kosher and trans fat changes later on) for Oreos and Double Stuffed Oreos, which have extra filling.

In total, Porcello held five patents related to his work on the Oreo. He also developed a product line of Oreos enrobed in white chocolate and dark chocolate. Porcello found the particular type of chocolate which he used for chocolate-covered Oreos while attending a food industry trade show in Europe.

Aside from his work with the Oreo, Porcello developed other Nabisco snack products, including SnackWells. His position required him to travel extensively in search of new potential products and ingredients. According to his son, Curtis, Porcello often brought new snacks home with him to see how his family liked or disliked the potential new products. Porcello was not a huge eater of Oreo cookies, preferring to eat the cookie without dunking it in milk.

== Later life ==
Porcello left the company as its principal food scientist in 1993 after 34 years. Additionally, he was a longtime volunteer with ACDI/VOCA, for which he helped create a food and program and company in Thailand. Sam Porcello died May 12, 2012, at the age of 76.
