= Lady Macbeth effect =

Psychological phenomenon

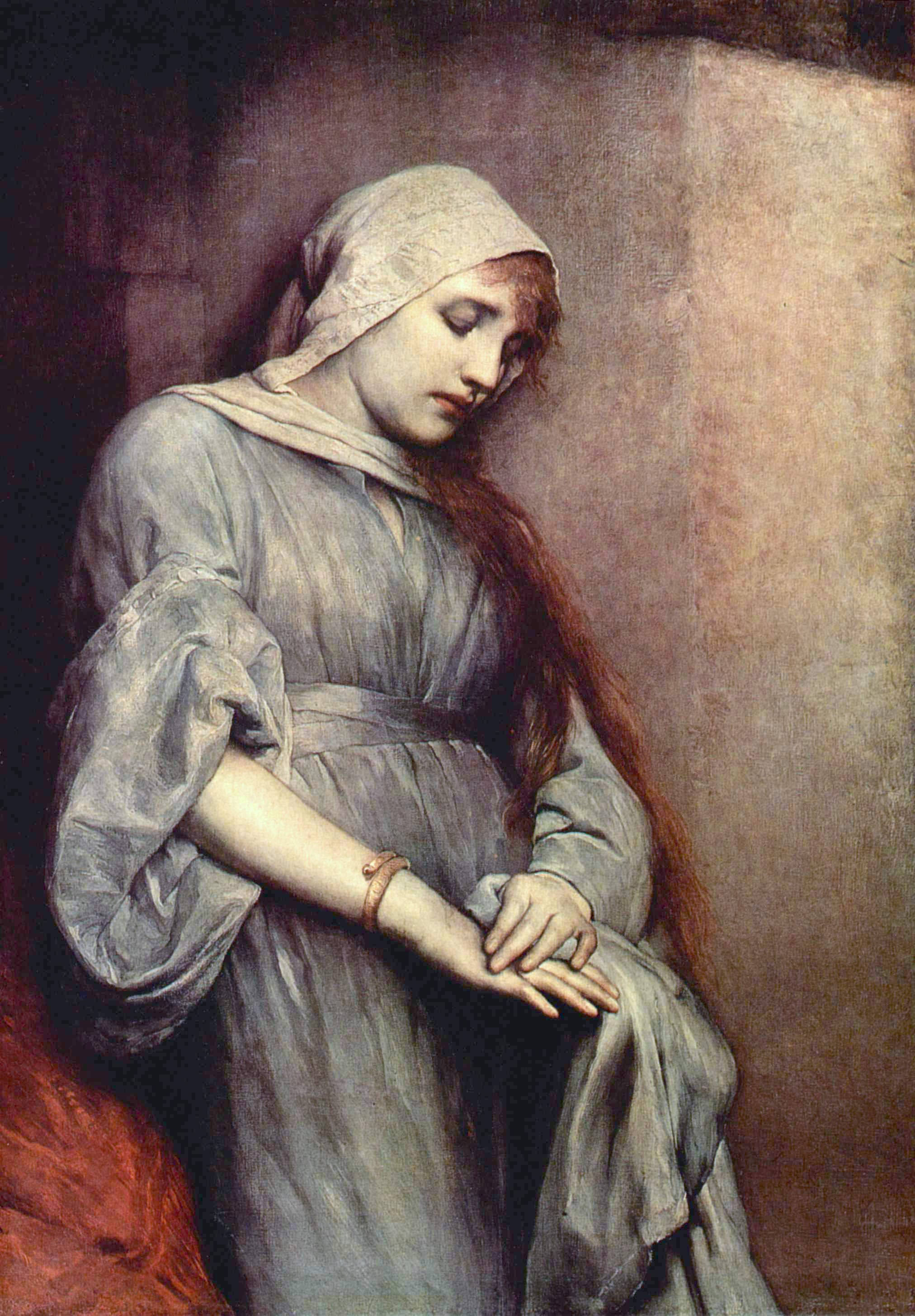
A painting by Gabriel von Max depicting Lady Macbeth attempting to clean her hand with the folded edge of her dress

The Lady Macbeth effect or Macbeth effect is a phenomenon in psychology where a sense of shame or moral failure may increase cleaning and cleanliness-seeking responses. It is named after Shakespeare's character Lady Macbeth, who obsessively washes herself in an attempt to clear her conscience after orchestrating murder, famously saying, "Out, damned spot!"

== Background ==
The Lady Macbeth effect was introduced in 2006 by Chen-Bo Zhong and Katie Liljenquist in the journal Science. In their study, participants were asked to recall an ethical or unethical deed from the past, then fill in the missing letters in "W_ _H", "SH_ _ER" and "S_ _P". Those who recalled their immoral deeds were more likely to choose cleanliness-related words like "WASH", "SHOWER" and "SOAP" rather than equally valid alternatives like "WISH", "SHAKER", or "STOP". Their counterparts showed no preference. In a separate experiment of whether physical washing "cleanses" guilt and moral stains, Zhong and Liljenquist had all participants recount immoral deeds, and found that the group permitted to wash their hands afterwards was much less likely to donate money to a desperate graduate student than the unwashed group, suggesting physical hygiene may have alleviated their moral guilt. "If cleanliness is related to moral purity," Zhong said, "then the cleanliness of one’s environment could have an impact on moral behavior."

In another experiment, experimenters were able to reduce choice-supportive bias by having subjects engage in forms of self-cleaning.

The effect is apparently localized enough that those who had been asked to lie verbally preferred an oral cleaning product and those asked to lie in writing preferred a hand cleaning product over the other kind of cleanser and other control items.

Some researchers have failed to replicate the effect using larger samples. Replication difficulties have emerged for three out of four of Zhong and Liljenquist's original studies (i.e., Study 2, Study 3, and Study 4). A meta-analysis of 15 studies examining the relationship between primes related to moral threat and cleansing preferences found a small effect, with no significant relationship evident across 11 studies conducted by researchers other than the original ones.

== See also ==
- Ritual purification
- Self-licensing
- Replication crisis
