= Self-licensing =

Psychological term related to self-image

Self-licensing (also moral self-licensing, moral licensing, or licensing effect) is a term used in social psychology and marketing to describe the subconscious phenomenon whereby increased confidence and security in one's self-image or self-concept tends to make that individual worry less about the consequences of subsequent immoral behavior and, therefore, more likely to make immoral choices and act immorally. In simple terms, self-licensing occurs when people allow themselves to indulge after doing something positive first; for example, drinking a diet soda with a greasy hamburger and fries can lead one to subconsciously discount the negative attributes of the meal's high caloric and cholesterol content.

A large subset of this effect, the moral credential effect, is a bias that occurs when a person's track record as a good egalitarian establishes in them an unconscious ethical certification, endorsement, or license that increases the likelihood of less egalitarian decisions later. This effect occurs even when the audience or moral peer group is unaware of the affected person's previously established moral credential. For example, individuals who had the opportunity to recruit a woman or Black person in one setting were more likely to say later, in a different setting, that a job would be better suited for a man or a white person. Similar effects also appear to occur when a person observes another person from a group they identify with making an egalitarian decision.

Self-licensing can have negative societal consequences since it has a permissive effect on behaviors such as racial prejudice and discrimination, selfishness, poor dietary and health habits, and excessive energy consumption.

But recent scholarship has failed to replicate seminal studies of the licensing effect, and meta-analysis found it to be exaggerated by publication bias. Furthermore, where licensing typically assumes that a good deed is the cause that makes subsequent transgressions more likely, an alternative (or additional) account is that people are faced with a temptation to do something morally dubious, and use a prior good deed as an excuse or reason why it is allowed for them to indulge.

The opposite of the licensing effect is the consistency effect, where a person’s behavior encourages them to continue it to maintain consistency. A meta-analysis examining when moral licensing versus consistency occurs found that people show more consistency when thinking abstractly about their initial behavior and values, but show more licensing when thinking concretely about what they have accomplished. For example, remembering a recent moral act may trigger licensing, while remembering a childhood moral act is more likely to trigger consistency. Other influencing factors include focusing on action outcomes (licensing) versus intentions and values (consistency), identification with the goal, and motives for the action.

== Definitions ==
Researchers Uzma Khan and Ravi Dhar describe the phenomena as follows:

[A] prior choice which activates and boosts a positive self-concept subsequently licenses the choice of a more self-indulgent option, [by reducing] negative self-attributions associated with the purchase of relative luxuries. [...] We show that consumers may be unaware of how their prior decisions influence their subsequent choices. In other words, the process underlying the licensing effect may be largely nonconscious.

Similarly, Anna Merritt and colleagues have explained that

Past good deeds can liberate individuals to engage in behaviors that are immoral, unethical, or otherwise problematic, behaviors that they would otherwise avoid for fear of feeling or appearing immoral.

== Group membership ==
It has been found that moral credentials can be obtained vicariously. That is, a person will behave as if they, themselves, have moral credentials, when that person observes another person from a group they identify with making an egalitarian decision. In research that draws on social identity theory, it was also found that group membership moderates the effectiveness of moral credentials in mitigating perceptions of prejudice. Specifically, it was observed that displays of moral credentials have more effect between people who share in-group status.

== Examples ==
Research suggests that self-licensing affects moral self-regulation and individual behavior in a variety of contexts; for example, it can influence consumer purchases, political opinions, charitable giving, energy policy and home energy use, job hiring, racial attitudes, health-related decision-making, risky sexual behavior, alcohol consumption, and dietary supplement use. Washington Post staff writer Michael Rosenwald described the following everyday examples of self-licensing behavior:

We drink Diet Coke – with Quarter Pounders and fries at McDonald's. We go to the gym – and ride the elevator to the second floor. We install tankless water heaters – then take longer showers. We drive SUVs to see Al Gore's speeches on global warming.

In a large experience sampling study, Hofmann and colleagues found evidence for moral licensing in people's everyday behavior outside of the lab, noting that "committing a moral act earlier in the day was associated with an above-average likelihood of a subsequent immoral act and a decreased likelihood of a subsequent moral act."

=== Dietary supplement use and unhealthy behavior ===
A 2011 study published by researchers in Taiwan indicated that people who take multivitamin pills, especially those who believe that they are receiving significant health benefits from supplement use, are more prone to subsequently engage in unhealthy activities. Participants in the study were divided into two groups, both of which were given placebo pills; one group was correctly informed that the pills contained no active ingredients and the other group was told that the pills were multivitamin supplements. Survey results showed that participants who thought that they had received a multivitamin were predisposed to smoking more cigarettes and more likely to believe that they were invulnerable to harm, injury, and disease as compared with subjects who knew that they were given a placebo. Participants who believed they were given a multivitamin were also less likely to exercise and to choose healthier food, and had a higher desire to engage in "hedonic activities that involve instant gratification but pose long-term health hazards", such as casual sex, sunbathing, wild parties, and excessive drinking. In the 'multivitamin' group, the more supplements a participant used, the less likely they were to exercise, and smoking was highest among participants who expressed a conscious belief that multivitamins increased health.

The study's authors argued that because dietary supplements are perceived as conferring health advantages, use of such supplements may create an illusory sense of invulnerability that disinhibits unhealthy behaviors. Overall, the study shows that people who take supplements may feel that merely taking a pill is a sufficient contribution to healthy living to enjoy other activities without regard to health, and it exposes a potential hypocrisy among supplement users. The authors advised:

Smokers who take dietary supplements can fool themselves into thinking they are protected against cancer and other diseases. Reminding health conscious smokers that multivitamins don't prevent cancer may help them control their smoking or even encourage them to stop.

Commenting on the implications of the study, Ben Goldacre said this:

Believing, incorrectly, that you've done something healthy by taking a vitamin pill makes you more likely to take genuine, concrete, real-world risks with your health. It's a chilling thought, but ideas aren't without impact, and every time we humour a harmless myth – that vitamin pills are healthy, that some fashionable berry prevents cancer – we might be doing more harm than we think.

=== Consumer purchasing decisions ===
Researchers Khan and Dhar investigated the influence of self-licensing on consumer decisions regarding the purchase of luxury goods. They reasoned that "relative preferences for a luxury option will be higher if people's prior decisions provide a boost to their relevant self-concept". Due to the self-licensing effect, "a prior intent to be virtuous boosts respondents' self-concepts, thus reducing negative self-attributions associated with the purchase of relative luxuries". Furthermore, they predicted that consumers may be unaware of how their prior decision influences their subsequent choices; i.e. the process underlying the licensing effect may be largely nonconscious. In the study, some participants were first asked to select from a list a charity organizations for which they would willingly volunteer three hours a week. Later, these people—and participants who hadn't been asked to volunteer—were asked whether they would buy designer jeans or an identically priced vacuum cleaner, assuming that they had enough money to buy only one. Participants who were asked to imagine having committed the charitable act before shopping were more than twice as likely to choose the jeans. The authors noted that "People don't even have to do good for this effect to happen ... Even if they plan to do something good, it will give them a boost in their self-image. Any type of situation where you have guilt involved, you will see this, and so this happens in luxury goods."

A study by University of Toronto behavioral marketing professor Nina Mazar and Chen-Bo Zhong found that people who bought green products were more likely to cheat and steal than those who bought conventional products. The researchers conducted an experiment in which they asked college students to shop for products online from either an eco-friendly or a conventional store. Each subject was then asked to divide a small sum of money between themselves and a stranger in a paradigm known as the dictator game, in which participants can cheat to make more money. The shoppers from the green store were more dishonest than those at the conventional store, which brought them higher earnings in the game. The authors suggested that the results could be accounted for by the licensing effect, noting that "When we engage in a good deed, that gives us a kind of satisfaction. With that self-satisfied feeling can come tacit permission to behave more selfishly next time we have the opportunity". The authors added that "purchasing green products may license indulgence in self-interested and unethical behaviors", and concluded:

We find that mere exposure to green products and the purchase of them lead to markedly different behavioral consequences. In line with the halo associated with green consumerism, people act more altruistically after mere exposure to green than conventional products; however, people act less altruistically and are more likely to cheat and steal after purchasing green products as opposed to conventional products.

However, subsequent research not only failed to replicate Mazar & Zhong's findings, but found that green consumption had no subsequent licensing effect on dishonesty.

=== Energy use ===
Researchers have invoked the self-licensing effect to explain why consumers who opt for energy-efficient products increase their energy usage so as to offset any potential gains. Energy economist Lucas Davis published a study showing that after getting high-efficiency washers, consumers increased clothes washing by nearly 6 percent. Other studies have shown that people leave energy-efficient lights on longer than conventional lights, and that many people who make their homes more energy efficient turn their heating up and ultimately see no reduction in energy costs.

=== Political opinions and racial preference ===
The self-licensing effect was examined by Monin and Miller in a 2001 study which demonstrated that when Princeton undergraduates established "non-prejudiced" credentials, they were more willing to express "prejudiced-sounding" opinions to an audience—even knowing the audience was unaware of their credentials. Subsequent research by Monin and Daniel Effron, using subjects paid in candy or cash and excluding those who preferred Republican presidential candidates in the 2004 or 2008 election, showed that the opportunity to endorse Barack Obama during the 2008 presidential election made those who did so more likely to express preferences favoring whites over blacks in hypothetical situations, such as hiring a police chief for a department experiencing racial tension. However, Monin and Effron cautioned that their "experimental tasks left ambiguous the extent to which these preferences represented prejudice."

== Meta-analyses and replications ==
Three meta-analyses have been published on self-licensing. Two of these meta-analyses suggest that the self-licensing effect might be moderated by culture, and the most recent of these meta-analyses suggest that previous estimates of the effect may be exaggerated due to publication bias (consistent with recent publication of failures to replicate the original finding).

== See also ==
- Discrimination
- Illusory superiority
- Lady Macbeth effect
- List of cognitive biases
- Noble cause corruption
- Prejudice
- Rebound effect
- Risk compensation
- Self-serving bias
- SnackWell effect
- Virtue signalling
