= Association of Energy Engineers =

- Company type: Non-Profit
- Industry: Energy engineering
- Website: https://www.aeecenter.org/

The Association of Energy Engineers (AEE) is a non-profit professional society founded in 1977 by Albert Thumann. The organization promotes scientific and education interests in the energy industry through its networking and outreach efforts and educational and professional certification programs.

== Certifications ==
Since 1981 the Association of Energy Engineers has certified more than 33,000 professionals, whose credentials are recognized by cities, states, countries and organizations around the world, as well as the U.S. Department of Energy and the U.S. Agency for International Development.

AEE offers the following certifications:

- Certified Energy Manager (CEM)
- Energy Manager in Training (EMIT)
- Certified Energy Auditor (CEA)
- Certified Energy Auditor – Master’s Level (CEAM)
- Certified Measurement & Verification Professional (CMVP)
- Certified Business Energy Professional (BEP)
- Certified Building Energy Simulation Analyst (BESA)
- Certified Building Commissioning Professional (CBCP)
- Certified Building Commissioning Professional – Master’ Level (CBCPM)
- Certified Energy Procurement Professional (CEP)
- Certified GeoExchange Designer (CGD) (see International Ground Source Heat Pump Association)
- Certified Lighting Efficiency Professional (CLEP)
- Certified Power Quality Professional (CPQ)
- Certified Carbon Reduction Manager (CRM)
- Certified Carbon Auditor Professional (CAP)
- Certified in the Use of RETScreen (CRU)
- Certified Sustainable Development Professional (CSDP)
- Distributed Generation Certified Professional (DGCP)
- Existing Building Commissioning Professional (EBCP)
- High Performance Building Professional (HPB)
- Green Building Engineer (GBE)
- Certified Residential Energy Auditor (REA)
- Renewable Energy Professional (REP)
- Energy Efficiency Practitioner (EEP)
- Certified Performance Contracting & Funding Professional (PCF)
- Government Operator of High Performance Buildings (GOHP)
- Certified Demand-Side Management Professional (CDSM)
- Certified Indoor Air Quality Professional (CIAQP)
- Certified Industrial Energy Professional (CIEP)
- Certified Water Efficiency Professional (CWEP)

== Conferences/shows ==
Each year, the Association of Energy Engineers (AEE) presents four conference and trade show events for energy and facility professionals. These events are held throughout the continental United States and Europe, and provide opportunities to find out more about the issues and marketplace developments that impact decisions, as well as to see emerging technologies first hand.

AEE's four annual trade show events are:

- AEE East Energy Conference & Expo
- AEE West Energy Conference & Expo
- AEE World Energy Conference & Expo
- AEE Europe Energy Conference & Expo

Conferences presented by AEE through 2018:

- World Energy Engineering Congress (WEEC)
- Globalcon Conference & Expo
- West Coast Energy Management Congress

== Publications ==
The Association of Energy Engineers publishes three journals:

- International Journal of Energy Management
- International Journal of Strategic Energy and Environmental Planning
- Alternative Energy and Distributed Generation Journal

AEE members also receive newsletters and reports on the energy industry.
