= Energy price =

The following articles relate to the price of energy:

- Carbon price
- Energy crisis
- Price of oil
- Gasoline and diesel usage and pricing
- Natural gas prices
- Hubbert peak theory, or peak oil
- Energy economics
- Electricity market
- Electricity pricing
- Cost of electricity by source
