= Energy conservation =

Reducing energy consumption

Energy conservation is the effort to reduce wasteful energy consumption by using fewer energy services. This can be done by using energy more effectively (using less and better sources of energy for continuous service) or changing one's behavior to use less and better source of service (for example, by driving vehicles which consume renewable energy or energy with more efficiency). Energy conservation can be achieved through efficient energy use, which has some advantages, including a reduction in greenhouse gas emissions and a smaller carbon footprint, as well as cost, water, and energy savings.

Green engineering practices improve the life cycle of the components of machines which convert energy from one form into another.

Energy can be conserved by reducing waste and losses, improving efficiency through technological upgrades, improving operations and maintenance, changing users' behaviors through user profiling or user activities, monitoring appliances, shifting load to off-peak hours, and providing energy-saving recommendations. Observing appliance usage, establishing an energy usage profile, and revealing energy consumption patterns in circumstances where energy is used poorly, can pinpoint user habits and behaviors in energy consumption. Appliance energy profiling helps identify inefficient appliances with high energy consumption and energy load. Seasonal variations also greatly influence energy load, as more air-conditioning is used in warmer seasons and heating in colder seasons. Achieving a balance between energy load and user comfort is complex yet essential for energy preservation. On a large scale, a few factors affect energy consumption trends, including political issues, technological developments, economic growth, and environmental concerns.

== User-oriented energy conservation ==
User behavior has a significant effect on energy conservation. It involves user activity detection, profiling, and appliance interaction behaviors. User profiling consists of the identification of energy usage patterns of the user and replacing required system settings with automated settings that can be initiated on request. Within user profiling, personal characteristics are instrumental in affecting energy conservation behavior. These characteristics include household income, education, gender, age, and social norms.

User behavior also relies on the impact of personality traits, social norms, and attitudes on energy conservation behavior. Beliefs and attitudes toward a convenient lifestyle, environmentally friendly transport, energy security, and residential location choices affect energy conservation behavior. As a result, energy conservation can be made possible by adopting pro-environmental behavior and energy-efficient systems. Education on approaches to energy conservation can result in wise energy use. The choices made by the users yield energy usage patterns. Rigorous analysis of these usage patterns identifies waste energy patterns, and improving those patterns may reduce significant energy load. Therefore, human behavior is critical to determining the implications of energy conservation measures and solving environmental problems. Substantial energy conservation may be achieved if users' habit loops are modified.

== User habits ==
User habits significantly impact energy demand; thus, providing recommendations for improving user habits contributes to energy conservation. Micro-moments are essential in realizing energy consumption patterns and are identified using a variety of sensing units positioned in prominent areas across the home. The micro-moment is an event that changes the state of the appliance from inactive to active and helps in building users' energy consumption profiles according to their activities.

Energy conservation can be achieved through user habits by following energy-saving recommendations at micro-moments. Unnecessary energy usage can be decreased by selecting a suitable schedule for appliance operation. Creating an effective scheduling system requires an understanding of user habits regarding appliances.

== Off-peak scheduling ==
Many techniques for energy conservation comprise off-peak scheduling, which means operating an appliance in a low-price energy hour. This schedule can be achieved after user habits regarding appliance use are understood. Most energy providers divide the energy tariff into high and low-price hours; therefore, scheduling an appliance to work an off-peak hour will significantly reduce electricity bills.

== User activity detection ==
User activity detection leads to the precise detection of appliances required for an activity. If an appliance is active but not required for a user's current activity, it wastes energy and can be turned off to conserve energy. The precise identification of user activities is necessary to achieve this method of energy conservation.

== Energy conservation opportunities by sector ==
=== Buildings ===
==== Existing buildings ====
Energy conservation measures have primarily focused on technological innovations to improve efficiencies and financial incentives with theoretical explanations obtained from the mentioned analytical traditions. Existing buildings can improve energy efficiency by changing structural maintenance materials, adjusting the composition of air conditioning systems, selecting energy-saving equipment, and formulating subsidy policies. These measures can improve users' thermal comfort and reduce buildings' environmental impact. The selection of combinatorial optimization schemes that contain measures to guide and restrict users' behavior in addition to carrying out demand-side management can dynamically adjust energy consumption. At the same time, economic means should enable users to change their behavior and achieve a low-carbon life. Combination optimization and pricing incentives reduce building energy consumption and carbon emissions and reduce users' costs.

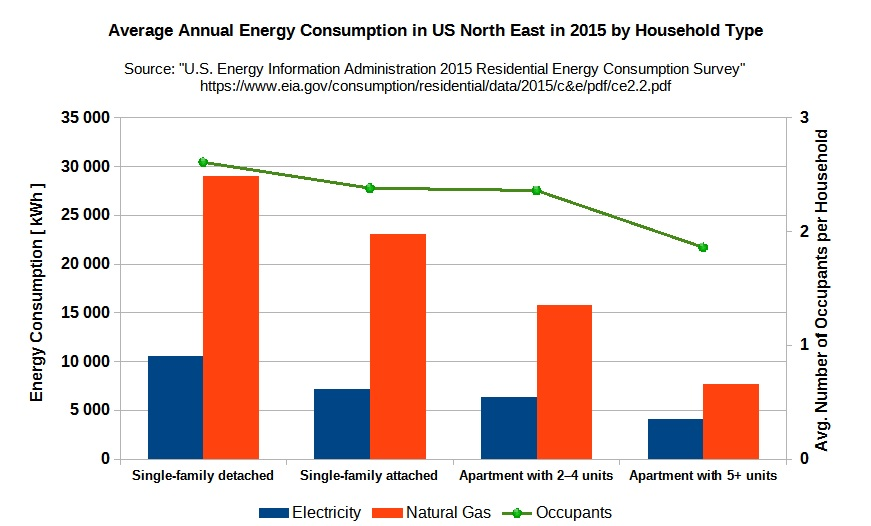
Energy consumption by household type in the northeast United States in 2015

Monitoring through energy audits can help in achieving energy efficiency in existing buildings. An energy audit is an inspection and analysis of energy use in a system intending to reduce energy input without negatively affecting output. Energy audits can determine specific opportunities for energy conservation and efficiency measures as well as determine cost-effective strategies. Training professionals typically accomplish this and can be part of some national programs discussed above. Smartphone apps enables homeowners to complete relatively sophisticated energy audits themselves. For instance, smart thermostats can connect to standard HVAC systems to maintain energy-saving indoor temperatures. In addition, data loggers can also be installed to monitor the interior temperature and humidity levels to provide a more precise understanding of the conditions. If the data gathered is compared with the users' perceptions of comfort, more fine-tuning of the interiors can be implemented (e.g., increasing the temperature where A.C. is used to prevent over-cooling). Building technologies and smart meters can allow commercial and residential energy users to visualize the impact their energy use can have in their workplaces or homes. Advanced real-time energy metering can help people save energy through their actions.

Another approach towards energy conservation is the implementation of ECMs in commercial buildings, which often employ Energy Service Companies (ESCOs) experienced in energy performance contracting. This industry has been around since the 1970s and is more prevalent than ever today. The US-based organization EVO (Efficiency Valuation Organization) has created a set of guidelines for ESCOs to adhere to in evaluating the savings achieved by ECMs. These guidelines are called the International Performance Measurement and Verification Protocol (IPMVP).

Energy efficiency can also be achieved by upgrading certain aspects of existing buildings. Making thermal improvements by adding insulation to crawl spaces and ensuring no leaks achieves an efficient building envelope, reducing the need for mechanical systems to heat and cool the space. High-performance insulation is also supported by adding double/triple-glazed windows to minimize heat transmission. Minor upgrades in existing buildings include changing mixers to low flow greatly aids in water conservation, changing light bulbs to LED lights results in 70–90% less energy consumption than a standard incandescent or C.F.L. bulb, changing inefficient appliances with Energy Star-rated appliances will consume less energy, and finally adding vegetation in the landscape surrounding the building to function as a shading element. A window windcatcher can reduce the total energy use of a building by 23.3%. Paint colors and new paint technologies can conserve energy.

A windcatcher and qanat used for cooling. Windcatchers "reduce the building's energy consumption and carbon footprint".

Energy conservation through users' behaviors requires understanding household occupants' lifestyle, social, and behavioral factors in analyzing energy consumption. This involves one-time investments in energy efficiency, such as purchasing new energy-efficient appliances or upgrading the building insulation without curtailing economic utility or the level of energy services, and energy curtailment behaviors which are theorized to be driven more by social-psychological factors and environmental concerns in comparison to the energy efficiency behaviors. Replacing existing appliances with newer and more efficient ones leads to energy efficiency as less energy is wasted throughout. Overall, energy efficiency behaviors are identified more with one-time, cost-incurring investments in efficient appliances and retrofits, while energy curtailment behaviors include repetitive, low-cost energy-saving efforts.

To identify and optimize residential energy use, conventional and behavioral economics, technology adoption theory and attitude-based decision-making, social and environmental psychology, and sociology must be analyzed. The techno-economic and psychological literature analysis focuses on the individual attitude, behavior, and choice/context/external conditions. In contrast, the sociological literature relies more on the energy consumption practices shaped by the social, cultural, and economic factors in a dynamic setting.

==== New buildings ====
Many steps can be taken toward energy conservation and efficiency when designing new buildings. Firstly, the building can be designed to optimize building performance by having an efficient building envelope with high-performing insulation and window glazing systems, window facades strategically oriented to optimize daylighting, shading elements to mitigate unwanted glare, and passive energy systems for appliances. In passive solar building designs, windows, walls, and floors are made to collect, store, and distribute solar energy in the form of heat in the winter and reject solar heat in the summer.

The key to designing a passive solar building is to best take advantage of the local climate. Elements to be considered include window placement and glazing type, thermal insulation, thermal mass, and shading. Optimizing daylighting can decrease energy waste from incandescent bulbs, windows, and balconies, allow natural ventilation, reduce the need for heating and cooling, low flow mixers aid in water conservation, and upgrade to Energy star rated appliances consume less energy. Designing a building according to LEED guidelines while incorporating smart home technology can help save a lot of energy and money in the long run. Passive solar design techniques can be applied most easily to new buildings, but existing buildings can be retrofitted.

Mainly, energy conservation is achieved by modifying user habits or providing an energy-saving recommendation of curtailing an appliance or scheduling it to low-price energy tariff hours. Besides changing user habits and appliance control, identifying irrelevant appliances concerning user activities in smart homes saves energy. Smart home technology can advise users on energy-saving strategies according to their behavior, encouraging behavioral change that leads to energy conservation. This guidance includes reminders to turn off lights, leakage sensors to prevent plumbing issues, running appliances on off-peak hours, and smart sensors that save energy. Such technology learns user-appliance activity patterns, gives a complete overview of various energy-consuming appliances, and can provide guidance to improve these patterns to contribute to energy conservation. It can strategically schedule appliances to the energy-efficient mode, or plan to work during off-peak hours. This usually leads to appliance curtailment in which an appliance is either scheduled to work another time or is turned off. Appliance curtailment involves appliance recognition, activity-appliances model, unattended appliance detection, and energy conservation service. The appliance recognition module detects active appliances to identify the activities of smart home users. After identifying users' activities, the association between the functional appliances and user activities is established. The unattended appliance detection module looks for active appliances but is unrelated to user activity. These functional appliances waste energy and can be turned off by providing recommendations to the user.

Users can give weight to certain appliances that increase user comfort while conserving energy. Energy consumption models of energy consumption of appliances and the level of comfort they create can balance priorities among smart home comfort levels and energy consumption. According to Kashimoto, Ogura, Yamamoto, Yasumoto, and Ito, the energy supply reduces based on the historical state of the appliance and increases according to the comfort level requirement of the user, leading to a targeted energy-saving ratio. Scenarios-based energy consumption can be employed as a strategy for energy conservation, with each scenario encompassing a specific set of rules for energy consumption.

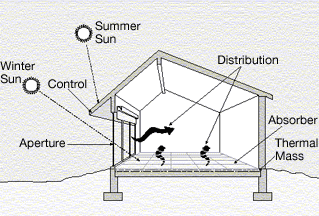
Elements of passive solar design, shown in a direct gain application

=== Transportation ===
Transporting people, goods, and services represented 29% of U.S. energy consumption in 2007. The transportation sector also accounted for about 33% of U.S. carbon dioxide emissions in 2006, with highway vehicles accounting for about 84% of that, making transportation an essential target for addressing global climate change (E.I.A., 2008). Suburban infrastructure evolved during an age of relatively easy access to fossil fuels, leading to transportation-dependent living systems.The amount of energy used to transport people to and from a facility, whether they are commuters, customers, vendors, or homeowners, is known as the transportation energy intensity of the building. Land is developing at a faster rate than population growth, leading to urban sprawl and, therefore, high transportation energy intensity as more people need to commute longer distances to jobs. As a result, the location of a building is essential in decreasing embodied emissions.

In transportation, state and local efforts in energy conservation and efficiency measures tend to be more targeted and smaller in scale. However, with more robust fuel economy standards, new targets for the use of alternative transportation fuels, and new efforts in electric and hybrid electric vehicles, EPAct05 and EISA provide a new set of national policy signals and financial incentives to the private sector and state and local governments for the transportation sector. Zoning reforms that allow greater urban density and designs for walking and bicycling can greatly reduce energy consumed for transportation. Many Americans work in jobs that allow for remote work instead of commuting daily, which is a significant opportunity to conserve energy. Intelligent transportation systems (ITS) provide a solution to traffic congestion and C.E.s caused by increased vehicles. ITS combines improvements in information technology and systems, communications, sensors, controllers, and advanced mathematical methods with the traditional world of transportation infrastructure. It improves traffic safety and mobility, reduces environmental impact, promotes sustainable transportation, and increases productivity. ITS can strengthen connection and cooperation between people, vehicles, roads, and the environment while improving road capacity, reducing traffic accidents, and improving transportation efficiency and safety by alleviating traffic congestion and reducing pollution. It makes full use of traffic information as an application service, which can enhance the operational efficiency of existing traffic facilities.

The most significant energy-saving potential is that there are the most problems in urban transportation in various countries, such as management systems, policies and regulations, planning, technology, operation, and management mechanism. Improvements in one or several aspects will improve road transportation. Efficiency has a positive impact, which leads to the improvement of the urban traffic environment and efficiency.

In addition to ITS, transit-oriented development (T.O.D.) improves transportation in urban areas by emphasizing density, proximity to transit, diversity of uses, and streetscape design. Density is important for optimizing location and is a way to cut down on driving. Planners can regulate development rights by exchanging them from ecologically sensitive areas to growth-friendly zones according to density transfer procedures. Distance is defined as the accessibility of rail and bus transits, which serve as deterrents for driving. For transit-oriented development to be feasible, transportation stops must be close to where people live. Diversity refers to mixed-use areas that offer essential services close to homes and offices and include residential spaces for different socioeconomic categories, commercial and retail. This creates a pedestrian shed where one area can meet people's everyday needs on foot. Lastly, the streetscapes design involves minimal parking and walkable areas that calm traffic. Generous parking incentivizes people to use cars, whereas minimal and expensive parking deters commuters. At the same time, streetscapes can be designed to incorporate bicycling lanes and designated bicycle paths and trails. People may commute by bicycle without being concerned about their bicycles becoming wet because of covered bicycle storage. This encourages commuters to use bicycles rather than other modes of transportation and contributes to energy saving. People will be happy to walk a few blocks from a train stop if there are attractive, pedestrian-friendly outdoor spaces nearby with good lighting, park benches, outdoor tables at cafés, shade tree plantings, pedestrian courts that are blocked off to cars, and public internet connection. Additionally, this strategy calms traffic, improving the intended pedestrian environment.

New urban planning schemes can be designed to improve connectivity in cities through networks of interconnected streets that spread out traffic flow, slow down vehicles, and make walking more pleasant. By dividing the number of road links by the number of road nodes, the connectivity index is calculated. The higher the connectivity index, the greater the route choices and the better the pedestrian access. Realizing the transportation impacts associated with buildings allows commuters to take steps toward energy conservation. Connectivity encourages energy-conserving behaviors as commuters use fewer cars, walk and bike more, and use public transportation. For commuters who do not have the option of public transportation, smaller vehicles that are hybrid or have better mileage can be used.

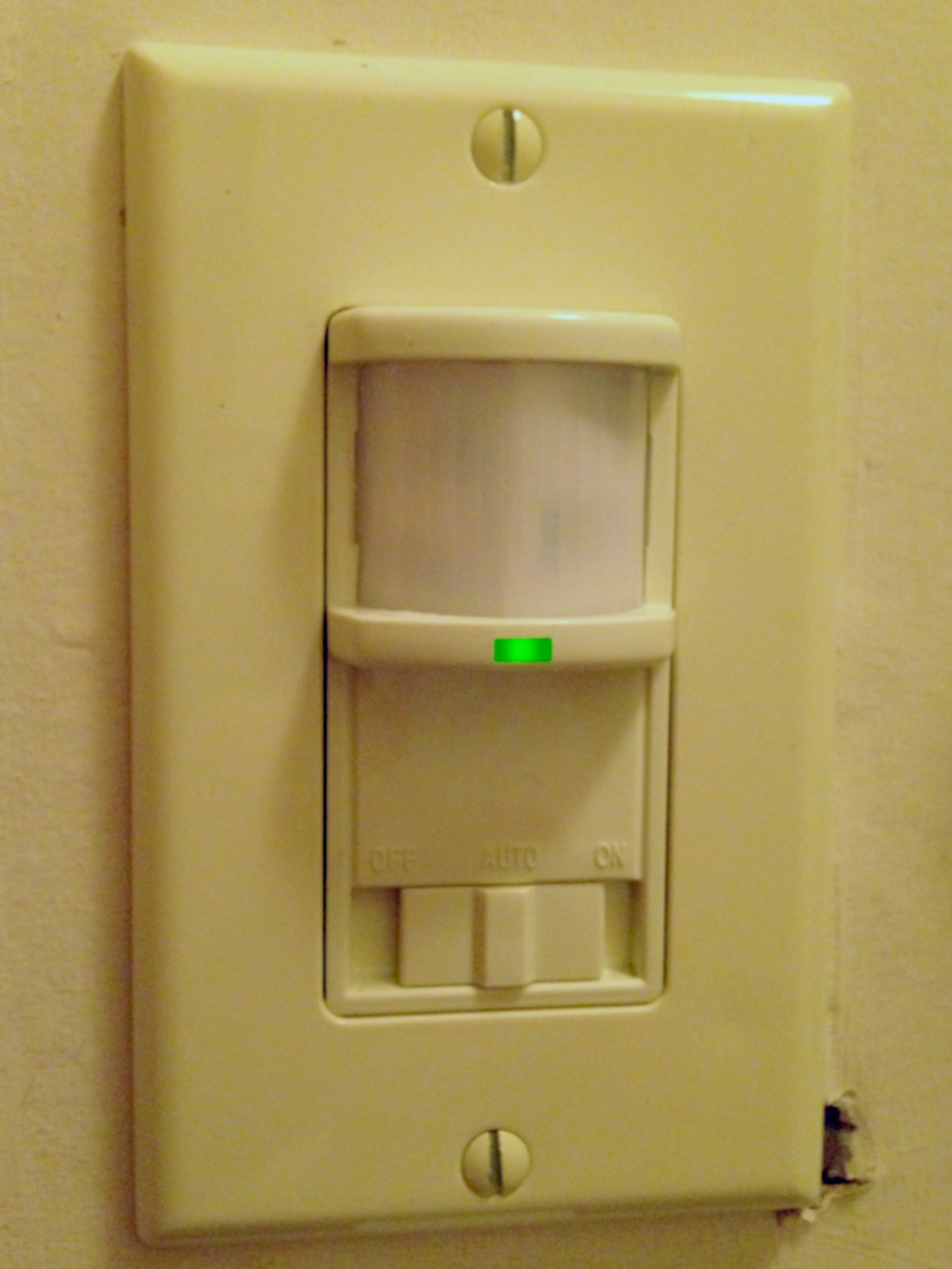
Occupancy sensors can conserve energy by turning off appliances in unoccupied rooms.

=== Consumer products ===
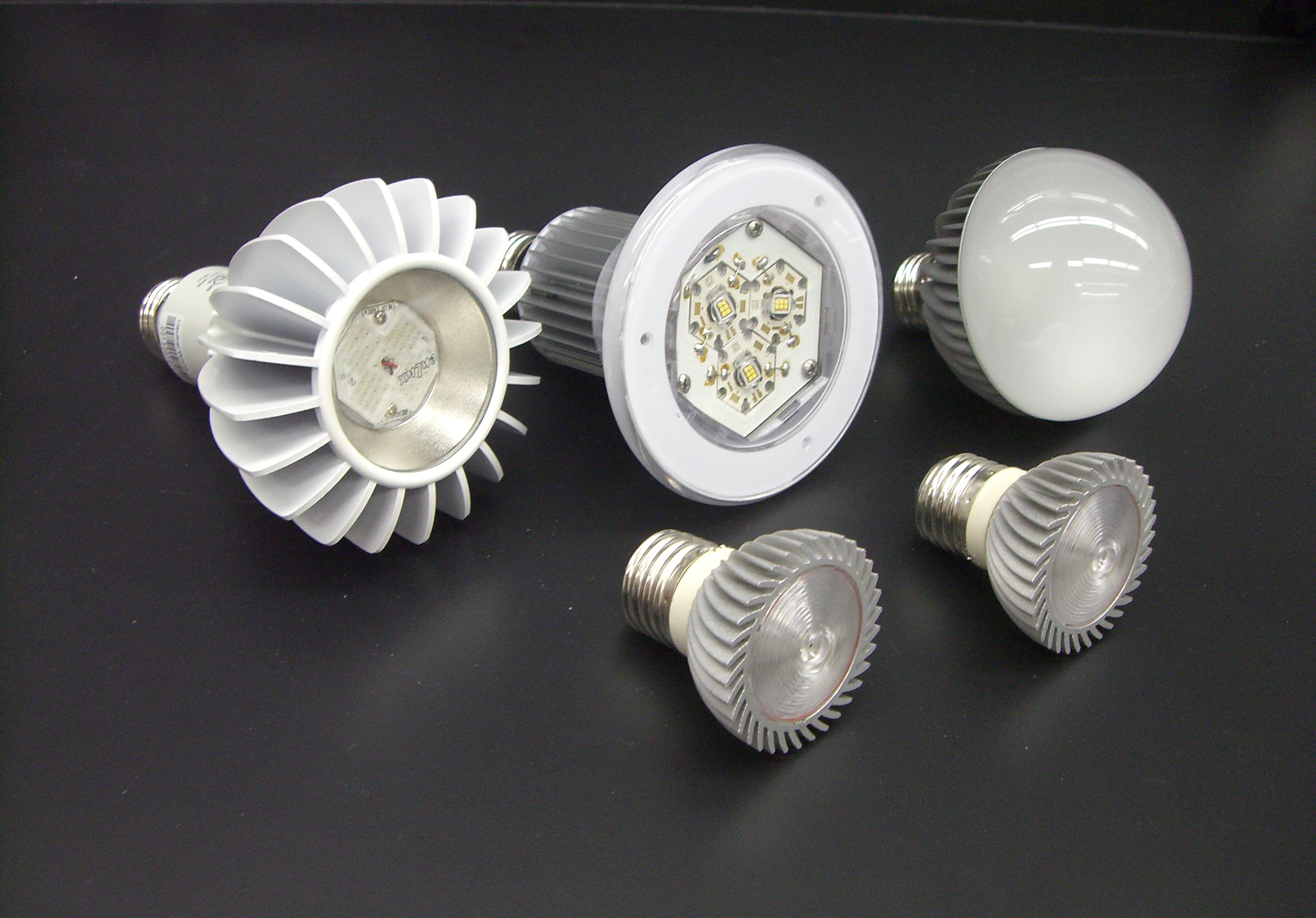
An assortment of energy-efficient semiconductor (LED) lamps for commercial and residential lighting use. LED lamps to use at least 75% less energy, and last 25 times longer, than traditional incandescent light bulbs.

Homeowners implementing ECMs in their residential buildings often start with an energy audit. This is a way homeowners look at what areas of their homes are using, and possibly losing energy. Residential energy auditors are accredited by the Building Performance Institute (BPI) or the Residential Energy Services Network (RESNET). Homeowners can hire a professional or do it themselves or use a smartphone to help do an audit.

Energy conservation measures are often combined into larger guaranteed Energy Savings Performance Contracts to maximize energy savings while minimizing disruption to building occupants by coordinating renovations. Some ECMs cost less to implement yet return higher energy savings. Traditionally, lighting projects were a good example of "low hanging fruit" that could be used to drive implementation of more substantial upgrades to HVAC systems in large facilities. Smaller buildings might combine window replacement with modern insulation using advanced building foams to improve energy for performance. Energy dashboard projects are a new kind of ECM that relies on the behavioral change of building occupants to save energy. When implemented as part of a program, case studies, such as that for the DC Schools, report energy savings up 30%. Under the right circumstances, open energy dashboards can even be implemented for free to improve upon these savings even more.

Consumers are often poorly informed of the savings of energy-efficient products. A prominent example of this is the energy savings that can be made by replacing an incandescent light bulb with a more modern alternative. When purchasing light bulbs, many consumers opt for cheap incandescent bulbs, failing to take into account their higher energy costs and lower lifespans when compared to modern compact fluorescent and LED bulbs. Although these energy-efficient alternatives have a higher upfront cost, their long lifespan and low energy use can save consumers a considerable amount of money. The price of LED bulbs has also been steadily decreasing in the past five years due to improvements in semiconductor technology. Many LED bulbs on the market qualify for utility rebates that further reduce the price of the purchase to the consumer. Estimates by the U.S. Department of Energy state that widespread adoption of LED lighting over the next 20 years could result in about $265 billion worth of savings in United States energy costs.

The research one must put into conserving energy is often too time-consuming and costly for the average consumer when there are cheaper products and technology available using today's fossil fuels. Some governments and NGOs are attempting to reduce this complexity with Eco-labels that make differences in energy efficiency easy to research while shopping.

To provide the kind of information and support people need to invest money, time and effort in energy conservation, it is important to understand and link to people's topical concerns. For instance, some retailers argue that bright lighting stimulates purchasing. However, health studies have demonstrated that headache, stress, blood pressure, fatigue and worker error all generally increase with the common over-illumination present in many workplace and retail settings. It has been shown that natural daylighting increases productivity levels of workers, while reducing energy consumption.

In warm climates where air conditioning is used, any household device that gives off heat will result in a larger load on the cooling system. Items such as stoves, dishwashers, clothes dryers, hot water, and incandescent lighting all add heat to the home. Low-power or insulated versions of these devices give off less heat for the air conditioning to remove. The air conditioning system can also improve efficiency by using a heat sink that is cooler than the standard air heat exchanger, such as geothermal or water.

In cold climates, heating air and water is a major demand for household energy use. Significant energy reductions are possible by using different technologies. Heat pumps are a more efficient alternative to electrical resistance heaters for warming air or water. A variety of efficient clothes dryers are available, and the clothes lines requires no energy- only time. Natural-gas (or bio-gas) condensing boilers and hot-air furnaces increase efficiency over standard hot-flue models. Standard electric boilers can be made to run only at hours of the day when they are needed by means of a time switch. This decreases energy use vastly. In showers, a semi-closed-loop system could be used. New construction implementing heat exchangers can capture heat from wastewater or exhaust air in bathrooms, laundry, and kitchens.

In both warm and cold climate extremes, airtight thermal insulated construction is the largest factor determining the efficiency of a home. Insulation is added to minimize the flow of heat to or from the home, but can be labor-intensive to retrofit to an existing home.

== Energy conservation by countries ==
=== Asia ===
Although energy efficiency is expected to play a vital role in cost-effectively cutting energy demand, only a small part of its economic potential is exploited in Asia. Governments have implemented a range of subsidies such as cash grants, cheap credit, tax exemptions, and co-financing with public-sector funds to encourage energy-efficiency initiatives across several sectors. Governments in the Asia-Pacific region have implemented a range of information provision and labeling programs for buildings, appliances, and the transportation and induel-economy labels, or actively seek to encourage behavioral changes, such as Japan's Cool Biz campaign that encourages setting air conditioners at 28-degrees Celsius and allowing employees to dress casually in the summer.

China's government has launched a series of policies since 2005 to effectively promote the goal of reducing energy-saving emissions; however, road transportation, the fastest-growing energy-consuming sector in the transportation industry, lacks specific, operational, and systematic energy-saving plans. Road transportation is the highest priority to achieve energy conservation effectively and reduce emissions, particularly since social and economic development has entered the "new norm" period. Generally speaking, the government should make comprehensive plans for conservation and emissions reduction in the road transportation industry within the three dimensions of demand, structure, and technology. For example, encouraging trips using public transportation and new transportation modes such as car-sharing and increasing investment in new energy vehicles in structure reform, etc.

=== European Union ===
At the end of 2006, the European Union (EU) pledged to cut its annual consumption of primary energy by 20% by 2020. The EU Energy Efficiency Directive 2012 mandates energy efficiency improvements within the EU.

As part of the EU's SAVE program, aimed at promoting energy efficiency and encouraging energy-saving behavior, the Boiler Efficiency Directive specifies minimum levels of efficiency for boilers using liquid or gaseous fuels.

There is steady progress on energy regulation implementation in Europe, North America, and Asia, with the highest number of building energy standards being adopted and implemented. Moreover, the performance of Europe is highly encouraging concerning energy standard activities. They recorded the highest percentage of mandatory energy standards compared to the other five regions.

In 2050, energy savings in Europe can reach 67% of the 2019 baseline scenario, amounting to a demand of 361 Mtoe in an "energy efficiency first" societal trend scenario. A condition is that there be no rebound effect, for otherwise the savings are 32% only or energy use may even increase by 42% if techno-economic potentials are not realized.

Germany has reduced its primary energy consumption by 11% from 1990 to 2015 and set itself goals of reducing it by 30% by the year 2030 and by 50% by the year 2050 in comparison to the level of 2008.

=== India ===
The Petroleum Conservation Research Association (PCRA) is an Indian governmental body created in 1978 that engages in promoting energy efficiency and conservation in every walk of life. In the recent past, PCRA has organised mass media campaigns in television, radio, and print media. This is an impact-assessment survey by a third party that revealed that due to these larger campaigns by PCRA, the public's overall awareness level has gone up leading to the saving of fossil fuels worth crores of rupees, besides reducing pollution.

The Bureau of Energy Efficiency is an Indian government organization created in 2001 that is responsible for promoting energy efficiency and conservation.

Protection and Conservation of Natural Resources are done by Community Natural Resources Management (CNRM).

=== Iran ===
Supreme leader of Iran Ali Khamenei had regularly criticized energy administration and high fuel consumption.

=== Japan ===
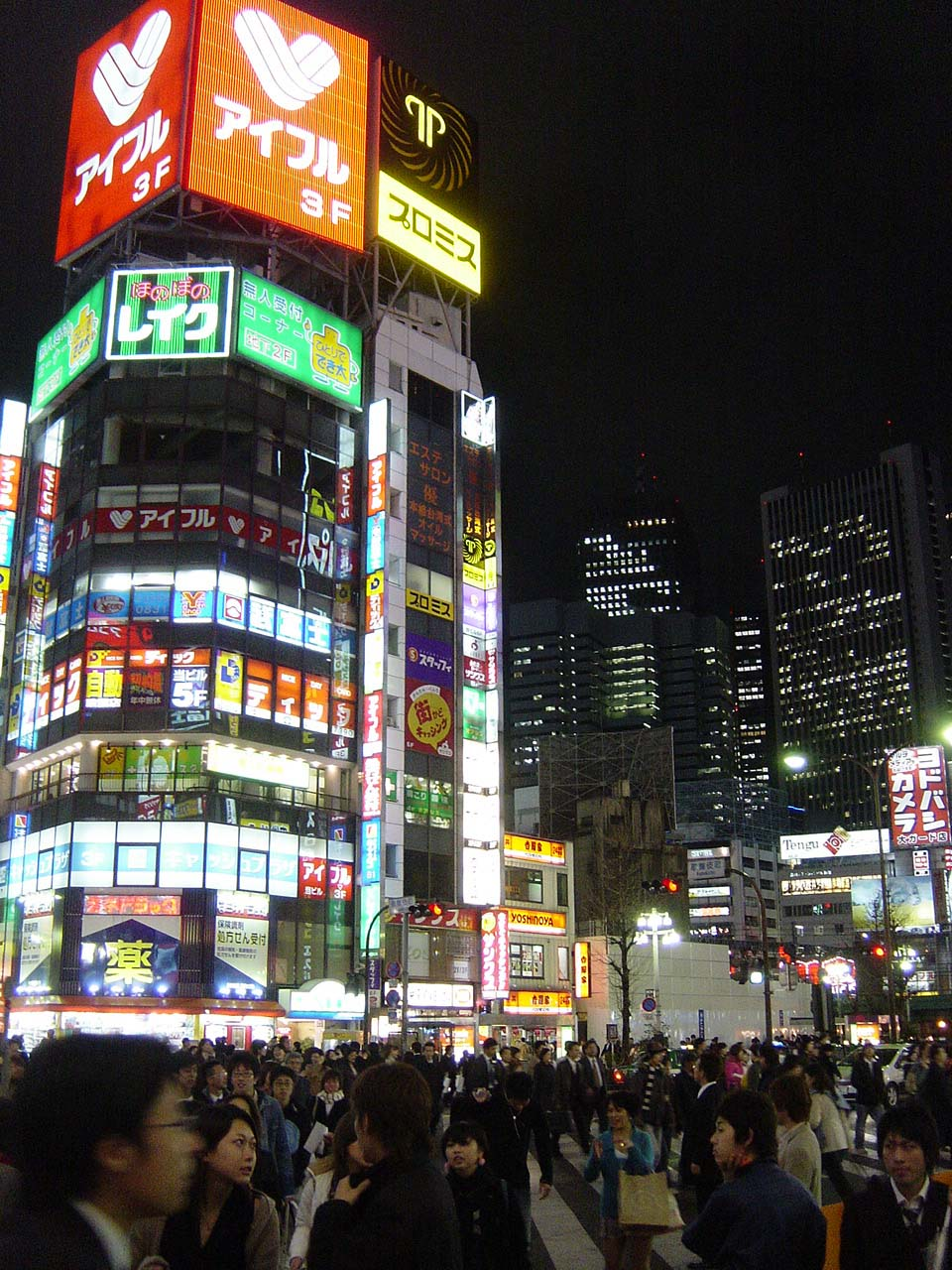
Advertising with high energy and light pollution in Shinjuku, Japan

Since the 1973 oil crisis, energy conservation has been an issue in Japan. All oil-based fuel is imported, so domestic sustainable energy is being developed.

The Energy Conservation Center promotes energy efficiency in every aspect of Japan. Public entities are implementing the efficient use of energy for industries and research. It includes projects such as the Top Runner Program. In this project, new appliances are regularly tested on efficiency, and the most efficient ones are made the standard.

=== Middle East ===
The Middle East holds 40% of the world's crude oil reserves and 23% of its natural gas reserves. Conservation of domestic fossil fuels is, therefore, a legitimate priority for the Gulf countries, given domestic needs as well as the global market for these products. Energy subsidies are the chief barrier to conservation in the Gulf. Residential electricity prices can be a tenth of U.S. rates. As a result, increased tariff revenues from gas, electricity, and water sales would encourage investment in natural gas exploration and production and generation capacity, helping to alleviate future shortages.

Households in the MENA region are responsible for 53% of energy use in Saudi Arabia and 57% of the UAE's ecological footprint. This is partially due to poorly designed and constructed buildings, mainly under a cheap energy model that has left them without contemporary control technology or even proper insulation and efficient appliances. Building energy consumption can be cut by 20% under a combination of insulation, efficient windows and appliances, shading, reflective roofing, and a host of automated controls that adjust energy use.

Governments could also set minimum energy efficiency and water use standards on importing appliances sold inside their countries, effectively banning the sale of inefficient air conditioners, dishwashers, and washing machines. Administration of the laws would essentially be a function of national customs services. Governments could go further, offering incentives – or mandates – that air conditioners of a certain age be replaced.

==== Lebanon ====
Since 2002 The Lebanese Center for Energy Conservation (LCEC) has been promoting the development of efficient and rational uses of energy and the use of renewable energy at the consumer level. It was created as a project financed by the International Environment Facility (GEF) and the Ministry of Energy Water (MEW) under the management of the United Nations Development Programme (UNDP) and gradually established itself as an independent technical national center although it continues to be supported by the United Nations Development Programme (UNDP) as indicated in the Memorandum of Understanding (MoU) signed between MEW and UNDP on 18 June 2007.

=== Nepal ===
Until recently, Nepal has been focusing on the exploitation of its huge water resources to produce hydropower. Demand-side management and energy conservation were not in the focus of government action. In 2009, bilateral Development Cooperation between Nepal and the Federal Republic of Germany has agreed upon the joint implementation of the "Nepal Energy Efficiency Programme". The lead executing agencies for the implementation are the Water and Energy Commission Secretariat (WECS). The aim of the program is the promotion of energy efficiency in policymaking, in rural and urban households as well as in the industry.

Due to the lack of a government organization that promotes energy efficiency in the country, the Federation of Nepalese Chambers of Commerce and Industry (FNCCI) has established the Energy Efficiency Centre under his roof to promote energy conservation in the private sector. The Energy Efficiency Centre is a non-profit initiative that is offering energy auditing services to the industries. The centre is also supported by Nepal Energy Efficiency Programme of Deutsche Gesellschaft für Internationale Zusammenarbeit.

A study conducted in 2012 found out that Nepalese industries could save 160,000-megawatt hours of electricity and 8,000 terajoules of thermal energy (like diesel, furnace oil, and coal) every year. These savings are equivalent to annual energy cost cut of up to 6.4 Billion Nepalese Rupees. As a result of Nepal Economic Forum 2014, an economic reform agenda in the priority sectors was declared focusing on energy conservation among others. In the energy reform agenda, the government of Nepal gave the commitment to introduce incentive packages in the budget of the fiscal year 2015/16 for industries that practices energy efficiency or use efficient technologies (incl. cogeneration).

=== New Zealand ===
In New Zealand the Energy Efficiency and Conservation Authority is the Government Agency responsible for promoting energy efficiency and conservation. The Energy Management Association of New Zealand is a membership-based organization representing the New Zealand energy services sector, providing training and accreditation services with the aim of ensuring energy management services are credible and dependable.

=== Nigeria ===
In Nigeria, the Lagos State Government is encouraging Lagosians to imbibe an energy conservation culture. In 2013, the Lagos State Electricity Board (LSEB) ran an initiative tagged "Conserve Energy, Save Money" under the Ministry of Energy and Mineral Resources. The initiative is designed to sensitize Lagosians around the theme of energy conservation by influencing their behavior through do-it-yourself tips. In September 2013, Governor Babatunde Raji Fashola of Lagos State and the campaign ambassador, rapper Jude "MI" Abaga participated in the Governor's conference video call on the topic of energy conservation.

In addition to this, during the month of October (the official energy conservation month in the state), LSEB hosted experience centers in malls around Lagos State where members of the public were encouraged to calculate their household energy consumption and discover ways to save money using a consumer-focused energy app. To get Lagosians started on energy conservation, solar lamps and energy-saving bulbs were also handed out.

In Kaduna State, the Kaduna Power Supply Company (KAPSCO) ran a program to replace all light bulbs in Public Offices; fitting energy-saving bulbs in place of incandescent bulbs. KAPSCO is also embarking on an initiative to retrofit all conventional streetlights in the Kaduna Metropolis to LEDs which consume much less energy.

=== Sri Lanka ===
Sri Lanka currently consumes fossil fuels, hydro power, wind power, solar power and dendro power for their day to day power generation. The Sri Lanka Sustainable Energy Authority is playing a major role regarding energy management and energy conservation. Today, most industries are requested to reduce their energy consumption by using renewable energy sources and optimizing their energy usage.

=== Turkey ===
Turkey aims to decrease by at least 20% the amount of energy consumed per GDP of Turkey by 2023 (energy intensity).

=== United Kingdom ===
The Department for Business, Energy and Industrial Strategy is responsible for promoting energy efficiency in the United Kingdom.

=== United States ===
The United States is currently the second-largest single consumer of energy, following China. The U.S. Department of Energy categorizes national energy use in four broad sectors: transportation, residential, commercial, and industrial.

About half of U.S. energy consumption in the transportation and residential sectors is primarily controlled by individual consumers. In the typical American home, space heating is the most significant energy use, followed by electrical technology (appliances, lighting, and electronics) and water heating. Commercial and industrial energy expenditures are determined by businesses entities and other facility managers. National energy policy has a significant effect on energy usage across all four sectors.

Since the oil embargoes and price spikes of the 1970s, energy efficiency and conservation have been fundamental tenets of U.S. energy policy. The scope of energy conservation and efficiency measures has been broadened throughout time by U.S. energy policies and programs, including federal and state legislation and regulatory actions, to include all economic sectors and all geographical areas of the nation. Measurable energy conservation and efficiency gains in the 1980s led to the 1987 Energy Security Report to the President (DOE, 1987) that "the United States uses about 29 quads less energy in a year today than it would have if our economic growth since 1972 had been accompanied by the less- efficient trends in energy use we were following at that time" The DOE Strategy and the legislation included new strategies for strengthening conservation and efficiency in buildings, industry, and electric power, such as integrated resource planning for electric and natural gas utilities and efficiency and labeling standards for 13 residential appliances and equipment categories. Lack of a national consensus on how to proceed interfered with developing a consistent and comprehensive approach. Nevertheless, the Energy Policy Act of 2005 (EPAct05; 109th U.S. Congress, 2005) contained many new energy conservation and efficiency provisions in the transportation, buildings, and electric power sectors.

The most recent federal law to increase and broaden U.S. energy conservation and efficiency laws, programs, and practices is the Energy Independence and Security Act of 2007 (EISA). Over the next few decades, it is anticipated that EISA will significantly reduce energy use because it has more standards and targets than previous legislation. Both acts reinforce the importance of lighting and appliance efficiency programs, targeting an additional 70% lighting efficiency by 2020, introducing 45 new standards for appliances, and setting up new standards for vehicle fuel economy. The Federal Government is also promoting a new 30% model code for efficient building practices in the construction industry. Additionally, according to the American Council for an Energy-Efficient Economy (ACEEE), the EISA's energy efficiency and conservation initiatives will cut carbon dioxide emissions by 9% in 2030. These requirements cover appliance and lighting efficiency, energy savings in homes, businesses, and public buildings, the effectiveness of industrial manufacturing facilities, and the efficiency of electricity supply and end use. Expectations are high for increased energy savings due to these initiatives, which have already started contributing to new federal, state, and local laws, programs, and practices across the U.S.

The development and use of alternative transportation fuels (whose supply is expected to expand by 15% by 2022), renewable energy sources, and other clean energy technologies have also received more attention and financial incentives. Recent policies also emphasize growing the use of coal with carbon capture and sequestration, solar, wind, nuclear, and other clean energy sources.

In February 2023 the United States Department of Energy proposed a set of new energy efficiency standards that, if implemented, will save to users of different electric machines in the United States around $3,500,000,000 per year and will reduce by the year 2050 carbon emissions by the same amount as emitted by 29,000,000 houses.

== Mechanisms to promote conservation ==
=== Governmental mechanisms ===
Governments at the national, regional, and local levels may implement policies to promote energy efficiency. Building energy rules can cover the energy consumption of an entire structure or specific building components, like heating and cooling systems. They represent some of the most frequently used instruments for energy efficiency improvements in buildings and can play an essential role in improving energy conservation in buildings. There are multiple reasons for the growth of these policies and programs since the 2000s, including cost savings as energy prices increased, growing concern about the environmental impacts of energy use, and public health concerns. The policies and programs related to energy conservation are critical to establishing safety and performance levels, assisting in consumer decision-making, and explicitly identifying energy-conserving and energy-efficient products.

Recent policies include new programs and regulatory incentives that call for electric and natural gas utilities to increase their involvement in delivering energy-efficiency products and services to their customers. For example, the National Action Plan for Energy Efficiency (NAPEE) is a public-private partnership created in response to EPAct05 that brings together senior executives from electric and natural gas utilities, state public utility commissions, other state agencies, and environmental and consumer groups representing every region of the country. The success of building energy regulation in effectively controlling energy consumption in the building sector will be, to a great extent, associated with the adopted energy performance indicator and the promoted energy assessment tools. It can help overcome significant market barriers and ensure cost-effective energy efficiency opportunities are incorporated into new buildings. This is crucial in emerging nations where new constructions are rapidly developing, and market and energy prices sometimes discourage efficient technologies. The building energy standards development and adoption showed that 42% of emerging developing countries surveyed have no energy standard in place, 20% have mandatory, 22% have mixed, and 16% proposed.

The major impediments to implementing building energy regulations for energy conservation and efficiency in the building sector are institutional barriers and market failures rather than technical problems, as pointed out by Nature Publishing Group (2008). Among these, Santamouris (2005) includes a lack of owners' awareness of energy conservation benefits, building energy regulations benefits, insufficient awareness and training of property managers, builders, and engineers, and a lack of specialized professionals to ensure compliance. Based on the above information, the development and adoption of building energy regulations, such as energy standards in developing countries, are still far behind compared to building energy regulation adoption and implementation in developed countries.

Building energy standards are starting to appear in Africa, Latin America, and Middle East regions, even though this is a new development going to the result obtained in this study. The level of progress on energy regulation activities in Africa, Latin America, and the Middle East is increasing, given the higher number of energy standard proposals recorded in these regions. According to the Royal Institute of Chartered Surveyors, several codes are being developed in developing countries with UNDP and GEF support. These typically include elemental and integrated routes to compliance, such as a fundamental method defining the performance requirements of specific building elements. However, they are still far behind in building energy regulation development, implementation, and compliance compared to developed nations. Also, decision-making regarding energy regulations is still from the government only, with little or no input from non-governmental entities. As a result, lower energy regulation development is recorded in these regions compared to regions with integrated and consensus approaches.

Additionally, there is growing government involvement in the development and implementation of energy standards; 62% of Middle Eastern respondents, 45% of African respondents, and 43% of Latin American respondents indicated that existing government agencies, such as building agencies and energy agencies, are involved in implementing building energy standards in their respective nations, as opposed to 20% of European respondents, 38% of Asian respondents, and 0% of North American respondents, who indicated the involvement of existing agencies. Several North African nations, like Tunisia and Egypt, have programs relating to building energy standards, while Algeria and Morocco are now seeking to establish building energy standards, according to the Royal Institute of Chartered Surveyors. Similarly, Egypt's residential energy standard became law in 2005, and their commercial standard was anticipated to follow. The standards provide minimal performance requirements for applications involving air conditioners and other appliances and elemental and integrated pathways. However, it was claimed that enforcement legislation was still required in 2005. Additionally, Morocco launched a program in 2005 to create thermal energy requirements for construction, concentrating on the hospitality, healthcare, and communal housing industries.

==== Mandatory energy standards ====
Energy standards are the primary way governments foster energy efficiency as a public good. A recognized standard-setting organization prepares a standard. Standards developed by recognized organizations are often used as the basis for the development and updating of building codes. They allow innovative approaches and techniques to achieve effective energy use and optimum building performance. Besides, it encourages cost-effective energy use of building components, including building envelope, lighting, HVAC, electrical installations, lift and escalator, and other equipment. Energy-efficiency standards have been expanded and strengthened for appliances, building equipment, and lighting. For example, appliances and equipment standards are being developed for a new range of devices, including reduction goals for "standby" power that keeps consumer electronic products in a ready-to-use mode. Some devices require certain levels of energy performance from a car, building, appliance, or other technical equipment. If the vehicle, building, appliance, or equipment does not meet these standards, there may be restrictions on its sale or rent. In the U.K., these are called "minimum energy efficiency standards" or MEES and were applied to privately rented accommodation in 2019.

Energy codes and standards are vital in setting minimum energy-efficient design and construction requirements. Buildings should be developed following energy standards to save energy efficiently. They specify uniform requirements for new buildings, additions, and modifications. National organizations like the American Society of Heating, Refrigerating, and Air-Conditioning Engineers publish the standards (ASHRAE). State and municipal governments frequently use energy standards as the technical foundation for creating their energy regulations. Some energy standards are written in a mandatory and enforceable language, making it simple for governments to add the standards' provisions directly to their laws or regulations.

The American Society of Heating, Refrigeration, and Air-Conditioning Engineers (ASHRAE) is a well-known example of a standard-making organization. This organization dates to the nineteenth century and is international in its membership (About ASHRAE 2018). Examples of ASHRAE standards that relate to energy conservation in the built environment are:

- Standard 62.1–2016 Ventilation for Acceptable Indoor Air Quality
- Standard 90.2-2007 Energy Efficient Design of Low-Rise Residential Buildings
- Standard 100-2018 Energy Efficiency in Existing Buildings
- Standard 189.1–2014 Standard for the Design of High-Performance Green Buildings

The Residential Energy Services Network is a crucial benchmark for energy reduction (RESNET). The Home Energy Rating System (HERS) of RESNET, which is based on the International Code Council's (ICC) energy code, is used to rate home energy consumption with a standard numerical scale that examines factors in home energy use (About HERS 2018). The American National Standards Institute (ANSI) has acknowledged the HERS assessment system as a national benchmark for evaluating energy efficiency. The International Energy Conservation Code (IECC) of the ICC requires an energy rating index, and the main index used in the residential building sector is HERS. The mortgage financing sector makes substantial use of the HERS index. A home's expected energy usage may impact the available mortgage funds based on the HERS score, with more energy-efficient, lower energy-using homes potentially qualifying for a better mortgage rate or amount.

==== Mandatory energy labels ====
Many governments require that a car, building, or piece of equipment be labeled with its energy performance. This allows consumers and customers to see the energy implications of their choices, but does not restrict their choices or regulate which products are available to choose from.

It also does not enable easily comparing options (such as being able to filter by energy-efficiency in online stores) or have the best energy-conserving options accessible (such as energy-conserving options being available in the frequented local store). (An analogy would be nutritional labeling on food.)

A trial of estimated financial energy cost of refrigerators alongside EU energy-efficiency class (EEEC) labels online found that the approach of labels involves a trade-off between financial considerations and higher cost requirements in effort or time for the product-selection from the many available options which are often unlabelled and don't have any EEEC-requirement for being bought, used or sold within the EU. Moreover, in this one trial the labeling was ineffective in shifting purchases towards more sustainable options.

==== Energy taxes ====
Some countries employ energy or carbon taxes to motivate energy users to reduce their consumption. Carbon taxes can motivate consumption to shift to energy sources with fewer emissions of carbon dioxide, such as solar power, wind power, hydroelectricity or nuclear power while avoiding cars with combustion engines, jet fuel, oil, fossil gas and coal. On the other hand, taxes on all energy consumption can reduce energy use across the board while reducing a broader array of environmental consequences arising from energy production. The state of California employs a tiered energy tax whereby every consumer receives a baseline energy allowance that carries a low tax. As for usage increases above that baseline, the tax increases drastically. Such programs aim to protect poorer households while creating a larger tax burden for high energy consumers.

Developing countries specifically are less likely to impose policy measures that slow carbon emissions as this would slow their economic development. These growing countries may be more likely to support their own economic growth and support their citizens rather than decreasing their carbon emissions.

The following pros and cons of a carbon tax help one to see some of the potential effects of a carbon tax policy.

Pros of Carbon Tax include:

- Making polluters pay the external cost of carbon emissions.
- Enables greater social efficiency as all citizens pay the full social cost.
- Raises revenue which can, in turn, be spent on mitigating the effects of pollution.
- Encourages firms and consumers to search for non-carbon producing alternatives (ex. solar power, wind power, hydroelectricity, or nuclear power).
- Reduces environmental costs associated with excess carbon pollution.

Cons of Carbon Tax include:

- Businesses claim higher taxes which can discourage investment and economic growth.
- A carbon tax may encourage tax evasion as firms may pollute in secret to avoid a carbon tax.
- It may be difficult to measure external costs and how much the carbon tax should truly be.
- There are administration costs in measuring pollution and collecting the associated tax.
- Firms may move production to countries in which there is no carbon tax.

=== Non-governmental mechanisms ===
==== Voluntary energy standards ====
Another aspect of promoting energy efficiency is using the Leadership in Energy and Environmental Design (LEED) voluntary building design standards. This program is supported by the US Green Building Council. The "Energy and Atmosphere" Prerequisite applies to energy issues, it focuses on energy performance, renewable energy, and other. See green building.

== See also ==
- Annual fuel use efficiency
- Domestic energy consumption
- Climate change mitigation
- Efficient energy use
- Energy conservation law
- Energy crisis
- Energy monitoring and targeting
- Energy recovery
- Energy recycling
- Energy storage
- Green computing
- High-temperature insulation wool
- Induced demand
- Jevons paradox
- Khazzoom–Brookes postulate
- List of energy storage projects
- List of low-energy building techniques
- Low Carbon Communities
- Marine fuel management
- Minimum energy performance standard
- One Watt Initiative
- Overconsumption
- Passive house
- Renewable heat
- Smart grid
- Superinsulation
- Thermal efficiency
- Water heat recycling
- Window film
- Zero-energy building
