= Green growth =

Economic growth that is environmentally sustainable

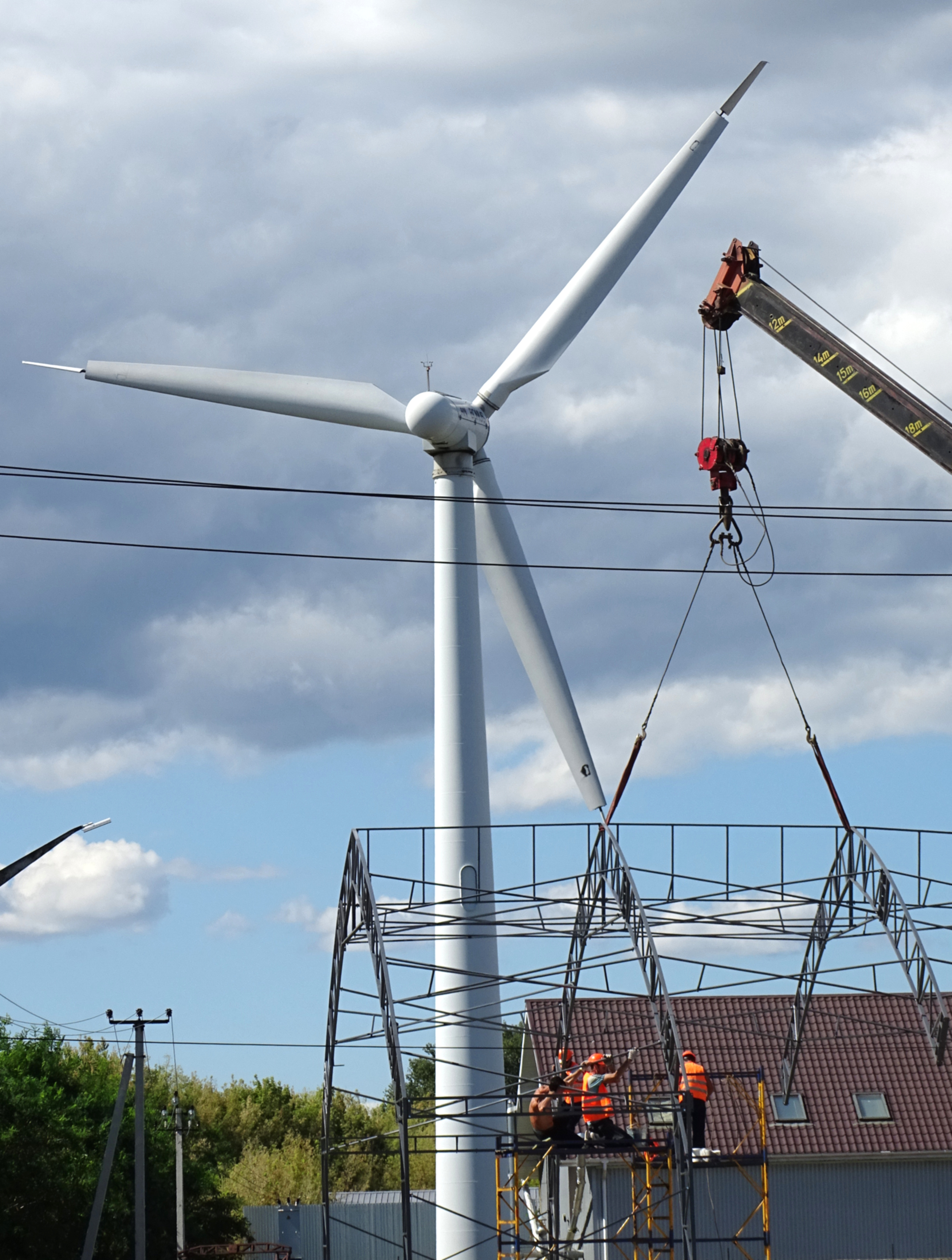
Wind turbine with workers - Boryspil, Ukraine

Green growth is a concept in economic theory and policymaking used to describe paths of economic growth that are environmentally sustainable. The term was coined in 2005 by the South Korean Rae Kwon Chung, a director at UNESCAP. It is based on the understanding that as long as economic growth remains a predominant goal, a decoupling of economic growth from resource use and adverse environmental impacts is required. As such, green growth is closely related to the concepts of green economy and low-carbon or sustainable development. A main driver for green growth is the transition towards sustainable energy systems. Advocates of green growth policies argue that well-implemented green policies can create opportunities for employment in sectors such as renewable energy, green agriculture, or sustainable forestry.

Several countries and international organizations, such as the Organisation for Economic Co-operation and Development (OECD), World Bank, and United Nations, have developed strategies on green growth; others, such as the Global Green Growth Institute (GGGI), are specifically dedicated to the issue. The term green growth has been used to describe national or international strategies, for example as part of economic recovery from the COVID-19 recession, often framed as a green recovery.

Critics of green growth highlight how green growth approaches do not fully account for the underlying economic systems change needed in order to address the climate crisis, biodiversity crisis and other environmental degradation. Critics point instead to alternative frameworks for economic change such as a circular economy, steady-state economy, degrowth, doughnut economics and others.

== Terminology ==
Green growth and related concepts stem from the observation that economic growth of the past 250 years has come largely at the expense of the environment upon which economic activities rely. The concept of green growth assumes that economic growth and development can continue while associated negative impacts on the environment, including climate change, are reduced (or while the natural environment continues to provide ecosystem services), meaning that a decoupling takes place.

On the subject of decoupling, a distinction is made between relative and absolute decoupling: Relative decoupling occurs when environmental pressure still grows, but less so than the gross domestic product (GDP). With absolute decoupling, an absolute reduction in resource use or emissions occurs, while the economy grows.

Further distinctions are made based on what is taken into account: decoupling economic growth from resource use (resource decoupling) or from environmental pressure (impact decoupling), different indicators for economic growth and environmental pressures (e.g. resource use, emissions, biodiversity loss), only the domestic level or also impacts along the global value chain, the entire economy or individual sectors (e.g. energy, agriculture), temporary vs. permanent decoupling, or decoupling to reach certain targets (e.g. limiting global warming to 1.5 °C or staying within planetary boundaries).

== History ==
While the related concepts of green growth, green economy and low-carbon development have received increasing international attention in recent years, the debate on growing environmental degradation in the face of economic growth dates back several decades. It was for example discussed in the 1972 report The Limits to Growth by the Club of Rome and reflected in the I = PAT-equation developed in the early 1970s. The consequent understanding of the need for a sustainable development was in the focus of the 1987 Brundtland Report as well as the United Nations Conference on Environment and Development (UNCED), or Earth Summit, in Rio de Janeiro in 1992. The Environmental Kuznets curve (EKC), theorizing that environmental pressure from economic growth first increases, then automatically decreases due in part to tertiarization, is disputed. Further influential developments include work by the economists Nicholas Stern and William Nordhaus, making the case for integrating environmental concerns into economic activities: The 2006 Stern Review on the Economics of Climate Change assessed the economic costs and risks of climate change and concluded that "the benefits of strong and early action far outweigh the economic costs of not acting".

The term "green growth" originates from the Asia Pacific Region and first emerged at the Fifth Ministerial Conference on Environment and Development (MCED) in Seoul, South Korea in 2005, where the Seoul Initiative Network on Green Growth was founded. Several international organisations had since turned their attention to green growth, in part to stimulate the economy during the 2008 financial crisis: At the request of countries, the OECD in 2011 published a Green Growth Strategy and in 2012, the World Bank, UNEP, OECD and GGGI launched the Green Growth Knowledge Platform (GGKP).

The related concepts of green growth, green economy and low-carbon development are sometimes used differently by different organisations but are also used interchangeably. Some organisation also include social aspects in their definitions.

== Employment ==
The report "Growth Within: A Circular Economy Vision for a Competitive Europe" predicts that there are many opportunities in recycling, producing longer-lasting products and offering maintenance services from the manufacturer.

According to the International Labour Organization, a shift to a greener economy could create 24 million new jobs globally by 2030, if environmental policies are put in place. Also, if a transition to a green economy were not to take place, 72 million full-time jobs may be lost by 2030 due to heat stress, and the temperature increases will lead to shorter available work hours, particularly in agriculture.

According to a 2020 report by the Green Alliance the job-creation schemes with the best value for money in the UK are: retrofitting buildings and creating cycle lanes; followed by electric ferries, battery factories and reforestation; and that these would create more jobs than proposed road-building schemes. They also say that new investment in nature recovery could quickly create 10,000 new jobs.

== Metrics ==
One metric commonly used to measure the resource use of economies is domestic material consumption (DMC). The European Union, for example, uses the DMC the measure its resource productivity. Based on this metric, it has been claimed that some developed countries have achieved relative or even absolute decoupling of material use from economic growth. The DMC, however, does not consider the shift of resource use which results from global supply chains, which is why another proposed metric is the material footprint (MF). The MF aims to encompass the resource use from the beginning of a production chain to its end, meaning from where raw materials are extracted to where the product or service is consumed. Research based on the MF indicates that resource use might be growing similarly to GDP for a number of countries, as for example for the EU-27 or the member countries of the OECD.

== Green growth as a policy strategy ==
=== Organizational efforts on green growth ===
- IEA: In 2020 the IEA published a strategy towards a "Clean Energy New Deal", which is being strongly promoted by executive director Fatih Birol.
- IMF: In 2020 Kristalina Georgieva, the head of the IMF, urged governments to invest emergency loans in green sectors, scrap subsidies to fossil fuels and tax carbon.
- UNESCAP: In 2012, the United Nations Economic and Social Commission for Asia and the Pacific released the Low Carbon Green Growth Roadmap for Asia and the Pacific to explore the opportunities that a low carbon green growth path offers to the region. The roadmap articulates five tracks on which to drive the economic system change necessary to pursue low carbon green growth as a new economic development path.
- OECD: In 2011 the OECD published a strategy towards green growth. In 2012, they also published a report on green growth and developing countries.
- UNEP: In 2008, the United Nations Environment Programme (UNEP) led the Green Economy Initiative.
- World Bank: In 2012, the World Bank published its report "Inclusive Green Growth: The Pathway to Sustainable Development".
- International Chamber of Commerce (ICC): In 2010, ICC launched the unique global business Task Force on Green Economy resulting in the Green Economy Roadmap, a guide for business, policymakers and society published in 2012.

=== Organizations devoted to green growth ===
- Global Green Growth Institute: Founded in 2010 by Korean President Lee Myung-bak and later GGGI was first launched as a think tank in 2010 by Korean President Lee Myung-bak and was later converted into an international treaty-based organization in 2012 at the Rio+20 Summit in Brazil.
- Green Growth Knowledge Platform: In January 2012, the Global Green Growth Institute, Organisation for Economic Co-operation and Development (OECD), United Nations Environment Programme (UNEP), and World Bank signed a Memorandum of Understanding to formally launch the Green Growth Knowledge Platform (GGKP). The GGKP's mission is to enhance and expand efforts to identify and address major knowledge gaps in green growth theory and practice, and to help countries design and implement policies to move towards a green economy.

=== National green growth efforts ===
- China: since at least 2006 (with its 11th 5-Year Plan), China has been committed to achieving a green economy. Emissions growth in recent years has decelerated sharply, underpinned by tighter environmental regulations and massive green investments, including in renewable energy and electric vehicle infrastructure. China's national emissions trading system (ETS) — which will be rolled out to the power sector in 2020 — could help facilitate the shift to cleaner energy. For price signals to be effective however, power producers need to compete, allowing less polluting and more efficient ones to trade freely and expand their market share (which has not yet been the case in 2020.) China also has an impact on the implementation of environmental technologies throughout Asia, via its Belt and Road Initiative International Green Development Coalition.
- EU: In 2010, the EU adopted the Europe 2020 strategy for "smart, sustainable and inclusive growth" for the 10-year period 2010–2020. In 2019, the European Green Deal was launched as "Europe's new growth strategy" with the aim of making the continent's economy sustainable. Eastern European businesses currently fall behind their Southern European counterparts in terms of the average quality of their green management practices, notably in terms of specified energy consumption and emissions objectives.
- South Korea: Green growth is being discussed in the National Assembly in 2020.
- United Kingdom: Green growth was strongly advocated in 2020 by the Committee on Climate Change.
- United States: President Barack Obama took several steps toward green growth. He believes that by investing in the future, energy production will not only reduce the dependency on foreign energy sources but will also create jobs and a 'clean-energy economy'. Obama had a goal of installing 10 gigawatts of renewable projects by 2020, doubling the wind and solar energy production by 2025, and to develop such policies, which will help to shape the nation's green economy. A 2014 report by the Center for American Progress quantified the levels of investment necessary for the US to attain green growth, while meeting the levels of emission reduction spelled out by the Intergovernmental Panel on Climate Change (IPCC). In 2019, Democratic members of Congress introduced the Green New Deal resolution to create an umbrella for future government programs.
- Japan: In 2021, the Ministry of Economy, Trade and Industry proposed the "Green Growth Strategy Through Achieving Carbon Neutrality in 2050" plan achieve carbon neutrality by 2050. There are 14 growth sectors identified in the strategy, categorized into 3 main industries: the energy-related industries, transportation/manufacturing-related industries, and home/office-related industries. Furthermore, this strategy established a Green Innovation Fund worth 2 trillion JPY (18.2 billion USD) that aims to fund research and development and social implementation, as well as hoping to inspire private companies to also invest in their green growth R&D.

=== Green Growth in Developing Countries ===
Developing countries tend to have economies which are more reliant on exploiting the environment's natural resources. Green technologies and sustainable development are not as affordable or accessible to them. At the same time, they are less able to protect themselves from the adverse effects of climate change and environmental degradation. They can face adverse health effects of polluted air and water, for example. Therefore, Green Growth could help improve the livelihoods and wellbeing of those in developing countries by protecting the environment and fostering economic growth.

In 2012, the Organization for Economic Co-operation and Development (OECD) drafted a report on Green Growth and developing countries as a summary for policy makers. This report outlines a policy framework that can be used by developing countries to achieve environmental and socio-economic goals. It also notes some concerns for Green Growth held by developing countries such as its ability to address poverty in practice and possible high cost barriers to green technologies.

== Requirements of Green Growth ==
Energy sources that meet the requirements of green growth must fit the criteria of the efficient use of natural resources, affordability, access, the prevention of environmental degradation, low health impacts, and high energy security. Renewable energy sources, including nuclear power, increase the power supply options for our current and future populations, and meet sustainable development requirements. While solar, wind, and nuclear energy have nearly no negative interactions with the environment when generating electricity, there is waste and emission connected to material extraction, manufacturing, and construction. Overall, all renewable energy sources are a fundamental part of a nation's green growth strategy. Nuclear, wind, and solar energy can all be beneficial and used together to combat climate change and kickstart green growth.

== Support ==
In a representative survey of Spanish citizens, Drews and van den Bergh (2016) found that a majority regarded economic growth and environmental sustainability as compatible (green growth), about one-third preferred either disregarding economic growth as a policy goal (agrowth) or halting it altogether (degrowth).

Drews and Van den Bergh surveyed scientists' views on economic growth versus the environment. The respondents were academics publishing on the relationship between economic growth and environmental sustainability, drawn from an interdisciplinary group of economists, environmental social scientists, and environmental natural scientists, selected based on their publications in leading peer-reviewed journals. Less than 1% favoured pursuing economic growth regardless of its environmental impacts ("growth at all costs"), 42% supported the view that growth can be made compatible with environmental sustainability ("green growth"), 31% preferred to disregard economic growth as a policy objective ("agrowth"), and 17% favoured halting economic growth altogether ("degrowth").

Recent analysis from the Energy & Climate Intelligence Unit found that 92% of global GDP and 89% of global emissions are in economies that have decoupled, either relatively or absolutely, up from 77% for both in the decade before the Paris Agreement (2006–2015). Between 2015 and 2023, countries representing more than 46% of global GDP achieved absolute decoupling, up from just over 38% in the pre-Paris period. The number of countries achieving absolute decoupling rose from 32 pre-Paris to 43 post-Paris, while those achieving relative decoupling rose from 35 to 40. Absolute decoupling is widespread across advanced economies, even when adjusting for emissions embodied in imports.

Research has also examined the role of technological change in enabling low-carbon growth. Acemoglu, Aghion, Bursztyn and Hemous developed a model showing that environmental policies can redirect technological change toward cleaner technologies, supporting sustained economic growth while reducing emissions.

Macroeconomic analyses have explored the potential growth effects of climate policy. Analyses by the Organisation for Economic Co-operation and Development suggested that ambitious climate policies could have positive effects on long-term economic output through increased investment, innovation, and improvements in energy efficiency.

Additional research has examined the economic opportunities associated with renewable energy deployment. Studies have found that investment in renewable energy and energy efficiency can generate employment and stimulate economic activity in emerging industries.

Several studies have found that environmental regulation can stimulate innovation and economic competitiveness. This idea is commonly referred to as the Porter hypothesis. Porter and van der Linde argued that well-designed environmental regulation can encourage firms to adopt more efficient technologies and production processes, potentially improving productivity and long-term economic performance.

== Criticism ==
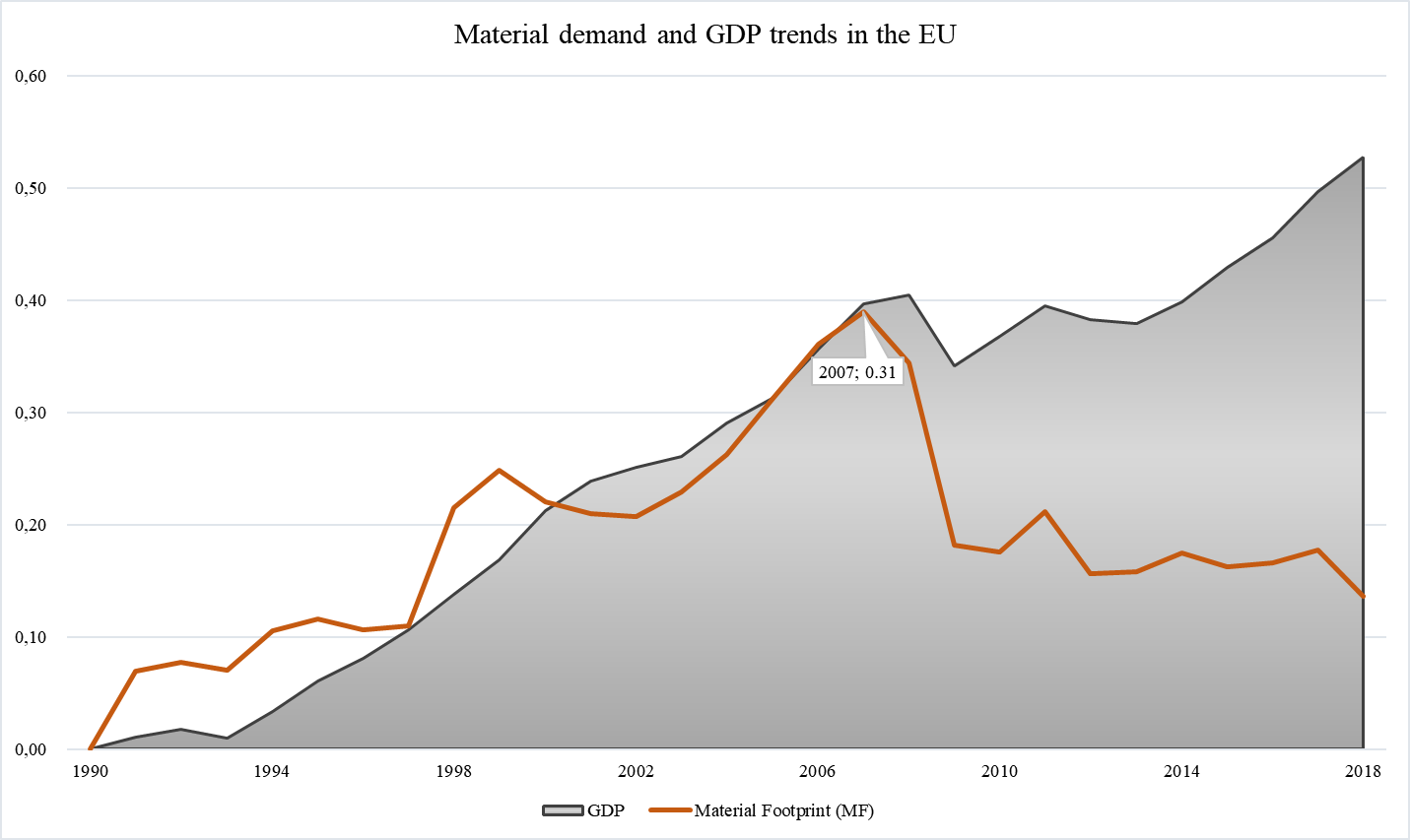
Trends in material footprint (MF) and gross domestic product (GDP) in the European Union from 1990 to 2018

A 2020 two-part systematic review published in Environmental Research Letters analyzed the full texts of 835 papers on the relationship between GDP, resource use (materials and energy) and greenhouse gas emissions. The first part found that "the vast majority of studies [...] approach the topic from a statistical-econometric point of view, while hardly acknowledging thermodynamic principles on the role of energy and materials for socio-economic activities. A potentially fundamental incompatibility between economic growth and systemic societal changes to address the climate crisis is rarely considered." The second part concluded "that large rapid absolute reductions of resource use and GHG emissions cannot be achieved through observed decoupling rates, hence decoupling needs to be complemented by sufficiency-oriented strategies and strict enforcement of absolute reduction targets."

A 2020 paper by Jason Hickel and Giorgos Kallis published in New Political Economy concludes that "there is no empirical evidence that absolute decoupling from resource use can be achieved on a global scale against a background of continued economic growth" and that "absolute decoupling from carbon emissions is highly unlikely to be achieved at a rate rapid enough to prevent global warming over 1.5°C or 2°C, even under optimistic policy conditions." It thus suggests looking for alternative strategies. Environmental scientist Rikard Warlenius argues in the scientific journal Ecological Economics that the pessimistic assessment of Hickel regarding decoupling is not based on robust arguments but rather on mystifications of what decoupling entails. Warlenius also finds their pessimism unfounded, noting that decoupling above 4% has already occurred and that there is no reason strong policy measures could not achieve even higher rates. Warlenius finds it surprising that scholars such as Hickel and Kallis could not imagine more "aggressive policies" than those used in their model. Under normal conditions, economic growth increases emissions (while carbon intensity declines), and degrowth (recession) stabilizes emissions. At the same time, however, growth is likely better positioned than degrowth to create the conditions necessary for ambitious climate action, such as the deep, transformative, and costly transitions outlined by the IPCC.

Another 2020 study shows that the pursuit of 'green growth' would increase inequality and unemployment unless accompanied by radical social policies.

== Limits ==
There are several limits to green growth. As described by the European Environmental Bureau (EEB), seven barriers could make green growth wishful thinking.

These barriers are as follows:

- Rising energy costs. The more natural resources are needed, the more expensive it will be to extract them.
- Rebound effects. Improved efficiency is often accompanied by the same or higher consumption of a given good or service.
- Displacement of the problem, all technological solutions lead to environmental externalities.
- Underestimated impact of services, the service economy is based on the material economy, so it will add a footprint rather than replace it.
- Limited recycling potential.
- Insufficient and inappropriate technological change. Technological progress is not disruptive and does not target the factors of production that matters for ecological sustainability.
- Cost shifting and decoupling phenomena have emerged, but they are characterised by the externalisation of environmental impact from high-consumption countries to low-consumption countries.

== See also ==
- Agrowth
- Alternative fuels
- Biobased economy
- Bright green environmentalism
- Circular economy
- Protecting and restoring degraded high-carbon ecosystems
- Divestment
- Ecological economics
- Eco-economic decoupling
- Free-market environmentalism
- Fossil fuel phase-out
- Georgism
- Green capitalism
- Green economy
- Greenwashing
- Green recovery
- Hydrogen economy
- Natural resource economics
- Industrial mass production in the renewable energy sector
- Peak oil: reached in 2020 according to the BP Energy Outlook 2020
- Reforestation
- Sustainable development
- Trillion Tree Campaign
- Urban planning
- Blue economy
