= Degrowth in the Global South =

Degrowth in the Global South examines the relevance, critiques, and adaptations of degrowth principles within countries typically classified as part of the Global South. While degrowth emerged as a concept and social movement in the Global North, particularly in Europe, there is increasing attention to how it intersects with issues of social justice, development, and sustainability in the Global South.

== Background ==
Degrowth is a political, economic, and ecological movement that critiques the dominant paradigm of continuous economic growth, particularly in wealthy nations, and instead advocates for the intentional downscaling of production and consumption to enhance ecological sustainability and social equity. The idea challenges GDP as the main indicator of wealth and calls for alternative metrics based on well-being and ecological limits.

However, applying degrowth to the Global South is debatable. Many countries in the South are still struggling with unmet basic needs, infrastructure deficits, and historical patterns of exploitation. Critics question whether degrowth is appropriate for regions that may still require some forms of material growth to ensure well-being.

== Historical roots ==
Although degrowth has been largely developed in the North, many of its philosophical roots lie in Southern traditions. Degrowth's intellectual lineage has been traced to the post-development thought and non-Western thinkers such as Rabindranath Tagore, J.C. Kumarappa, and Ananda Coomaraswamy. Philosophies like Buen Vivir in the Andean region and Ubuntu in Southern Africa emphasize community, harmony with nature, and relational well-being, offering Southern alternatives to growth-centric models.

Furthermore, early critiques of development from the Global South—such as by Arturo Escobar and Gustavo Esteva—questioned the universality of Western modernization and laid the groundwork for post-growth and decolonial thinking.

== Shared pathways ==
Several scholars and activists point to synergies between degrowth and movements in the Global South. For example, struggles against extractivism in Latin America, community fisheries in Turkey, and indigenous ecotourism in Ecuador embody principles of local autonomy, ecological balance, and resistance to capitalist growth—core elements of degrowth.

Degrowth in the North is also framed by some as an act of decolonization, aiming to reduce the North's ecological footprint and create space for the South to pursue its own pathways. The concept of ecological debt—the idea that the North owes the South for centuries of environmental exploitation—figures prominently in this narrative.

== Challenges ==
Despite these overlaps, degrowth's application to the Global South is fraught with tension. Critics argue that:

- The framing of degrowth is often Eurocentric and may not resonate with the urgent developmental needs of Southern populations.
- Degrowth in the North could destabilize export-dependent economies in the South, particularly those reliant on commodity exports.
- The movement risks reproducing neocolonial patterns by prescribing a model developed in the North for use in the South.

Dengler and Seebacher argue for a feminist decolonial degrowth approach that centers historically marginalized voices and emphasizes alliances with Global South movements based on solidarity rather than paternalism.

== Post-growth alternatives ==
Rather than advocating for a uniform application of degrowth across all regions, some scholars propose that the Global South could benefit more from a broader post-growth framework. This approach involves:

- Agrowth, which adopts a neutral stance toward economic growth, emphasizing that growth is neither inherently good nor necessary;
- Steady-state economics, which promotes maintaining a stable level of resource and energy throughput within ecological limits;
- Post-development theories, which critique and reject Western-centric models of development, advocating for diverse and locally rooted alternatives.

Adopting a post-growth framework allows for contextualized strategies that prioritize the satisfaction of basic needs, equitable wealth redistribution, and ecological regeneration, rather than strictly pursuing economic growth.
