= Eco-economic decoupling =

Concept for economic growth without environmental damage

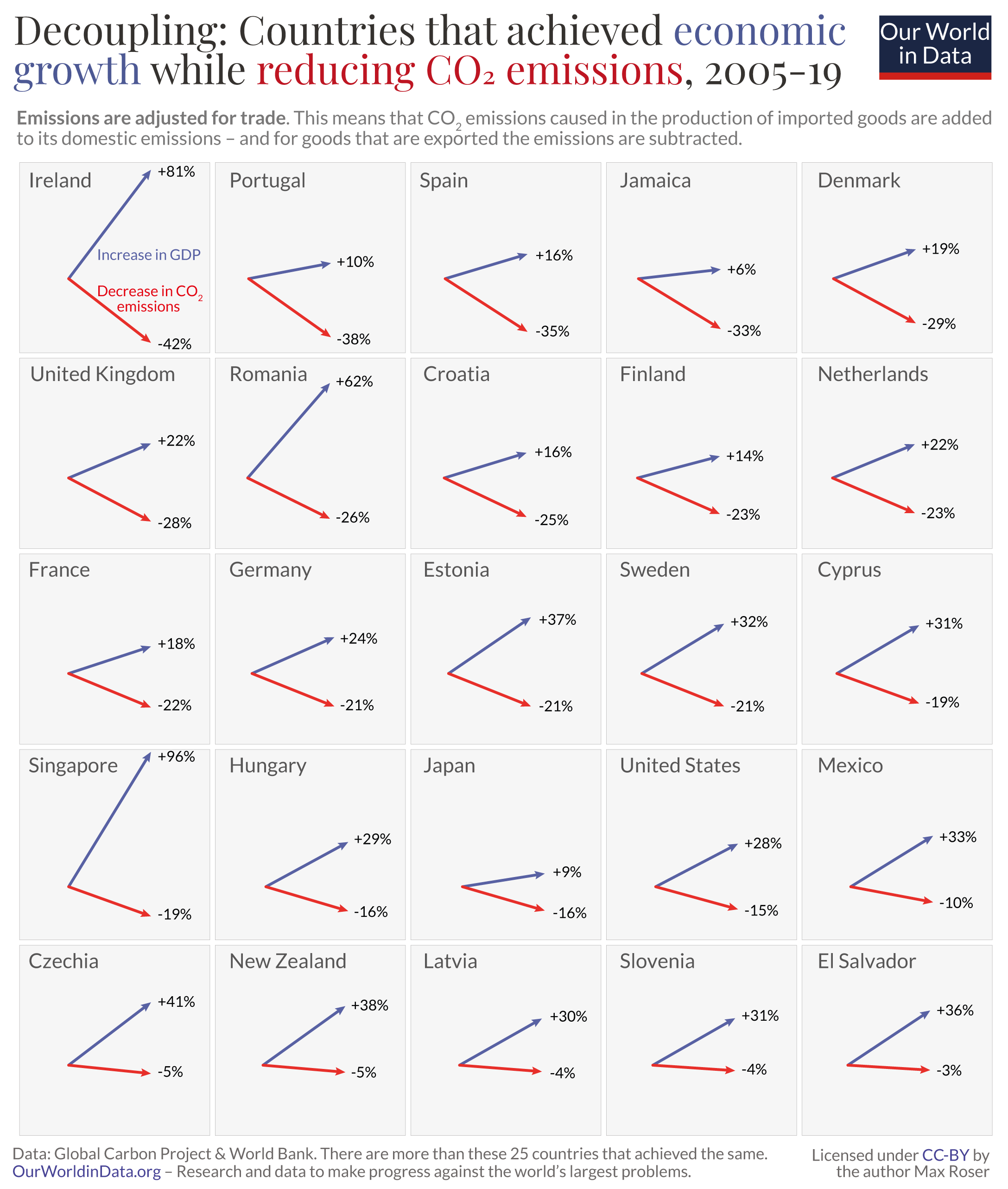
Example of decoupling on a single environmental indicator (greenhouse gas emissions): Countries that managed to reduce their greenhouse gas emissions while still growing their economy over a given time window.

In economic and environmental fields, decoupling refers to an economy that would be able to grow without corresponding increases in environmental pressure. In many economies, increasing production (GDP) raises pressure on the environment. An economy that would be able to sustain economic growth while reducing the amount of resources such as water or fossil fuels used and delink environmental deterioration at the same time would be said to be decoupled. Environmental pressure is often measured using emissions of pollutants, and decoupling is often measured by the emission intensity of economic output.

Studies have found that absolute decoupling was rare and that only a few industrialised countries had weak decoupling of GDP from "consumption-based" CO_{2} production. No evidence was found of national or international economy-wide decoupling in a study in 2020. In cases where evidence of decoupling exists, one proposed explanation is the transition to a service economy. The environmental Kuznets curve is a proposed model for eco-economic decoupling.

== Definition ==
In 2002, the OECD defined the term as follows: "the term 'decoupling' refers to breaking the link between "environmental bads" and "economic goods." It explains this as having rates of increasing wealth greater than the rates of increasing impacts.

== Terminology ==
=== Five axes to assess decoupling ===
There are at least five axes to assess eco-economic decoupling:

1. Environmental indicators: overall or partial. Overall decoupling refers to cases where decoupling occurs between GDP and all environmental indicators (e.g. water use, land use, greenhouse gas emissions, etc.), while partial for cases where it only concerns one or more environmental indicator, but not all of them. This axis is particularly important for cases where decoupling occurs on one environmental indicator, but at the expenses of another one (e.g. reducing greenhouse gas emissions, but increasing mining).
2. Range: relative or absolute decoupling. (See below)
3. Scale: global or local. Local decoupling refers to cases where decoupling is observed between variables relative to a restricted geographical perimeter (e.g. a country or a water basin), while global decoupling corresponds to decoupling between two variables at the planetary scale (e.g. world GDP and world greenhouse gas emissions). This axis is particularly important for cases where decoupling occurs in some countries, but at the expense of increasing environmental stress in other countries (essentially, outsourcing production).
4. Durability: temporary or permanent. Continuous economic growth requires a permanent absolute decoupling between GDP and environmental pressures. Yet, economic growth and environmental pressures can re-couple later on, making the decoupling only temporary.
5. Magnitude: sufficient or insufficient. In order to be effective, decoupling should be large and fast enough to prevent environmental stress from reaching critical environmental tipping points (often described as planetary boundaries), which lead to de facto irreversible environmental effects.

A more comprehensive checklist to assess eco-economic decoupling can be found in the figure at page 17 in.

=== Relative and absolute decoupling ===
Tim Jackson, author of Prosperity Without Growth, stresses the importance of differentiating between relative and absolute decoupling:

- Relative decoupling refers to a decline in the ecological intensity per unit of economic output. In this situation, resource impacts decline relative to the GDP, which could itself still be rising.
- Absolute decoupling refers to a situation in which resource impacts decline in absolute terms. Resource efficiencies must increase at least as fast as economic output does and must continue to improve as the economy grows, if absolute decoupling is to occur.

Jackson points out that an economy can correctly claim that it has relatively decoupled its economy in terms of energy inputs per unit of GDP. However, in this situation, total environmental impacts would still be increasing, albeit at a slower pace of growth than in GDP.

Jackson uses this distinction to caution against technology-optimists who use the term decoupling as an "escape route from the dilemma of growth". He points out that "there is quite a lot of evidence to support the existence of [relative decoupling]" in global economies, however "evidence for [absolute decoupling] is harder to find".

Similarly, ecological economist and steady-state theorist Herman Daly stated in 1991:

It is true that "In 1969 a dollar's worth of GNP was produced with one-half the materials used to produce a dollar's worth of GNP in 1900, in constant dollars." Nevertheless, over the same period total materials by consumption increased by 400 percent.

Relative and absolute decoupling
	Relative decoupling	Absolute decoupling
Description	Decline in the resource intensity per unit of economic output	Resource use decline in absolute terms while economic output rise
Example	Increased carbon efficiency (but lower than economic growth)	Increased carbon efficiency higher than economic growth
Link with I = PAT	Carbon intensity decline (but ≤ population + income growths)	Carbon intensity decline > (population growth + income growth)
Evidence for carbon emissions	Yes: 34% decrease between 1965 and 2015 (CO_{2}/$GDP)	No: 300% increase between 1965 and 2015 (absolute CO_{2} emissions)
Evidence for resource extraction	No: resource use increases more than GDP (1990-2015)	No: resource use increases overall (1990-2015)

Between 1990 and 2015, the carbon intensity per $GDP declined of 0.6 percent per year (relative decoupling), but the population grew of 1.3 percent per year and the income per capita also grew of 1.3 percent per year. That is to say, the carbon emissions grew of 1.3 + 1.3 − 0.6 = 2 percent per year, leading to a 62% increase in 25 years (the data reflect no absolute decoupling). According to Tim Jackson:

There is no simple formula that leads from the efficiency of the market to the meeting of ecological targets. Simplistic assumptions that capitalism's propensity for efficiency will allow us to stabilise the climate are nothing short of delusional. [...] The analysis in this chapter suggests that it is entirely fanciful to suppose that 'deep' emission and resource cuts can be achieved without confronting the structure of market economies.

On economic growth and environmental degradation, Donella Meadows wrote:

Growth has costs as well as benefits, and we typically don't count the costs – among which are poverty and hunger, environmental destruction, and so on – the whole list of problems that we are trying to solve with growth! What is needed is much slower growth, very different kinds of growth, and in some cases no growth or negative growth. The world's leaders are correctly fixated on economic growth as the answer to virtually all problems, but they're pushing it with all their might in the wrong direction.

=== Resource and impact decoupling ===
Resource decoupling refers to reducing the rate of resource use per unit of economic activity. The "dematerialization" is based on using less material, energy, water and land resources for the same economic input. Impact decoupling required increasing economic output while reducing negative environmental impacts. These impacts arise from the extraction of resources.

== Relevance ==
Historically there has been a close correlation between economic growth and environmental degradation: as communities grow in size and prosperity, so the environment declines. This trend is clearly demonstrated on graphs of human population numbers, economic growth, and environmental indicators. There is a concern that, unless resource use is checked, modern global civilization will follow the path of ancient civilizations that collapsed through overexploitation of their resource base. While conventional economics is concerned largely with economic growth and the efficient allocation of resources, ecological economics has the explicit goal of sustainable scale (rather than continual growth), fair distribution and efficient allocation, in that order. The World Business Council for Sustainable Development states that "business cannot succeed in societies that fail."

In economic and environmental fields, the term decoupling is becoming increasingly used in the context of economic production and environmental quality. When used in this way, it refers to the ability of an economy to grow without incurring corresponding increases in environmental pressure. Ecological economics includes the study of societal metabolism, the throughput of resources that enter and exit the economic system in relation to environmental quality. An economy that can sustain GDP growth without harming the environment is said to be decoupled. Exactly how, if, or to what extent this can be achieved is a subject of much debate.

In 2011 the International Resource Panel, hosted by the United Nations Environment Programme (UNEP), warned that by 2050 the human race could be devouring 140 billion tons of minerals, ores, fossil fuels and biomass per year—three times its current rate of consumption—unless nations can make serious attempts at decoupling. The report noted that citizens of developed countries consume an average of 16 tons of those four key resources per capita per annum (ranging up to 40 or more tons per person in some developed countries). By comparison, the average person in India today consumes four tons per year.

Sustainability studies analyse ways to reduce resource intensity (the amount of resource (e.g. water, energy, or materials) needed for the production, consumption and disposal of a unit of good or service) whether this be achieved from improved economic management, product design, or new technology.

There are conflicting views on whether improvements in technological efficiency and innovation will enable a complete decoupling of economic growth from environmental degradation. On the one hand, it has been claimed repeatedly by efficiency experts that resource use intensity (i.e., energy and materials use per unit GDP) could in principle be reduced by at least four or five-fold, thereby allowing for continued economic growth without increasing resource depletion and associated pollution. On the other hand, an extensive historical analysis of technological efficiency improvements has conclusively shown that improvements in the efficiency of the use of energy and materials were almost always outpaced by economic growth, in large part because of the rebound effect (conservation) or Jevons Paradox resulting in a net increase in resource use and associated pollution. Furthermore, there are inherent thermodynamic (i.e., second law of thermodynamics) and practical limits to all efficiency improvements. For example, there are certain minimum unavoidable material requirements for growing food, and there are limits to making automobiles, houses, furniture, and other products lighter and thinner without the risk of losing their necessary functions. Since it is both theoretically and practically impossible to increase resource use efficiencies indefinitely, it is equally impossible to have continued and infinite economic growth without a concomitant increase in resource depletion and environmental pollution, i.e., economic growth and resource depletion can be decoupled to some degree over the short run but not the long run. Consequently, long-term sustainability requires the transition to a steady state economy in which total GDP remains more or less constant, as has been advocated for decades by Herman Daly and others in the ecological economics community.

The OECD 2019 Report "Environment at a Glance Indicators – Climate change" points out that the issue of diminishing GHG emissions while maintaining GDP growth is a major challenge for the forthcoming years.

== Policies ==
Policies have been proposed for creating the conditions that enable widespread investments in resource productivity. According to Mark Patton a global leading expert, Such potential policies include the raising of resource prices in line with increases in energy or resource productivity, a shift in revenue-raising onto resource prices through resource taxation at source or in relation to product imports, with recycling of revenues back to the economy, ...

== Technologies ==
Several technologies have been described in the Decoupling 2 report, including:

- Technologies to save energy (technologies directly reducing fossil fuel consumption, saving electricity in industry, reducing fossil-fuel demand in transportation, ...)
- Technologies saving metals and minerals (technologies reducing metal use, saving materials from waste streams, ...)
- Technologies saving freshwater and biotic resources (technologies saving freshwater extraction, protecting soil fertility, saving biotic resources, ...)

== Documentation ==
In 2014, the same International Resource Panel published a second report, "Decoupling 2", which "highlights existing technological possibilities and opportunities for both developing and developed countries to accelerate decoupling and reap the environmental and economic benefits of increased resource productivity." The lead coordinating author of this report was Ernst Ulrich von Weizsäcker.

In 2016, the International Resource Panel published a report indicating that "global material productivity has declined since about the year 2000 and the global economy now needs more materials per unit of GDP than it did at the turn of the century" as a result of shifts in production from high-income to middle-income countries. That is to say, the growth of material flows has been stronger than the growth of gross domestic product. This is the opposite of decoupling, a situation that some people call overcoupling.

== Lack of evidence for decoupling ==
There is no empirical evidence supporting the existence of an eco-economic decoupling near the scale needed to avoid environmental degradation, and it is unlikely to happen in the future. Environmental pressures can only be reduced by rethinking green growth policies, where a sufficiency approach complements greater efficiency.

In 2020, an analysis by Gaya Herrington, then Director of Sustainability Services of KPMG US, was published in Yale University's Journal of Industrial Ecology. The study assessed whether, given key data known in 2020 about factors important for the "Limits to Growth" report, the original report's conclusions are supported. In particular, the 2020 study examined updated quantitative information about ten factors, namely population, fertility rates, mortality rates, industrial output, food production, services, non-renewable resources, persistent pollution, human welfare, and ecological footprint, and concluded that the "Limits to Growth" prediction is essentially correct in that continued economic growth is unsustainable.

The study found that current empirical data is most closely consistent with 2 scenarios: Business as Usual (BAU) and Comprehensive technology (CT). In both scenarios, growth will peak around 2030 but in the BAU scenario societal collapse will follow around 2040, while in the CT scenario the adverse impacts will be softened. The less likely is the Stabilized World (SW) model describing a world going toward sustainability, in which economic growth is stopped but welfare is not hurt. The author concluded her study saying: "Although SW tracks least closely, a deliberate trajectory change brought about by society turning towards another goal than growth is still possible. That window of opportunity is closing fast."

According to scientist and author Vaclav Smil, "Without a biosphere in a good shape, there is no life on the planet. It's very simple. That's all you need to know. The economists will tell you we can decouple growth from material consumption, but that is total nonsense. The options are quite clear from the historical evidence. If you don't manage decline, then you succumb to it and you are gone. The best hope is that you find some way to manage it."

In 2020, a meta-analysis of 180 scientific studies notes that there is "No evidence of the kind of decoupling needed for ecological sustainability" and that "in the absence of robust evidence, the goal of decoupling rests partly on faith".

=== Conflicting views ===
Environmental scientist Rikard Warlenius argues in the scientific journal Ecological Economics that the pessimistic assessment of degrowth authors such as Hickel and Kallis regarding decoupling is not based on robust arguments but rather on mystifications of what decoupling entails. They assume a maximum annual reduction in the carbon intensity of GDP of 4%, combined with the notion that global GDP must decline or converge. Based on these assumptions, limiting global warming to 1.5 °C would be impossible, and even the 2 °C target would only be achievable if high-income countries reduced their economies by more than 90%, and middle-income countries by around 70%. However, such a scenario is widely considered politically unrealistic, which could in turn jeopardize the climate targets themselves. According to Warlenius, their pessimism is also unfounded. There are already examples of absolute decoupling where emissions declined faster than the 4% threshold proposed by Hickel and Kallis. Moreover, he argues that no compelling reasons are given as to why strong policy measures would not be able to achieve higher rates of decoupling. He finds it surprising that scholars such as Hickel and Kallis could not imagine more "aggressive policies" than those used in their model. Under normal conditions, economic growth increases emissions (while carbon intensity declines), and degrowth (recession) stabilizes emissions. At the same time, however, growth is likely better positioned than degrowth to create the conditions necessary for ambitious climate action, such as the deep, transformative, and costly transitions outlined by the IPCC.

== See also ==
- Eco-innovation
- Ecological modernization
- Energy conservation
- Economics of climate change mitigation
- Green growth
- Jevons paradox
- Kaya identity
- Rebound effect (conservation)
- Steady-state economy
- Sustainability
