= IPAT =

IPAT may refer to:

- I = PAT equation in environmental science
- Interdisciplinary Project group for Appropriate Technology, 1976–1988, TU-Berlin
- iPAT, a term used in fMRI imaging by Siemens, for its implementation of parallel imaging (a method to increase the speed of image acquisition).
- Institute for Personality and Ability Testing
