= Kaya identity =

Identity regarding anthropogenic carbon dioxide emissions

Kaya Identity: drivers of CO_{2} emissions in the World. Percentage change in the four parameters of the Kaya Identity, which determine total CO_{2} emissions.

The Kaya identity is a mathematical identity that disaggregates the total emission level of the greenhouse gas carbon dioxide so that it can be expressed as the product of four calculable factors: human population, GDP per capita, energy intensity (per unit of GDP), and carbon intensity (emissions per unit of energy consumed). It is a concrete form of the more general I = PAT equation relating factors that determine the level of human impact on climate. Although the terms in the Kaya identity would in theory cancel out, it is useful in practice to calculate emissions in terms of more readily available data, namely population, GDP per capita, energy per unit GDP, and emissions per unit energy. It furthermore highlights the elements of the global economy on which one could act to reduce emissions, notably the energy intensity per unit GDP and the emissions per unit energy.

== Overview ==
The Kaya identity was developed by Japanese energy economist Yoichi Kaya. It is the subject of his book Environment, Energy, and Economy: strategies for sustainability, co-authored with Keiichi Yokobori as the output of the 1993 Conference on Global Environment, Energy, and Economic Development in Tokyo. It is a variation of Paul R. Ehrlich & John Holdren's I=PAT formula that describes the factors of environmental impact.

Kaya identity is expressed in the form:

$$F = P \cdot \frac{G}{P} \cdot \frac{E}{G} \cdot \frac{F}{E}$$

Where:

- F is global CO_{2} emissions from human sources
- P is global population
- G is world GDP
- E is global energy consumption

And:

- G/P is the GDP per capita
- E/G is the energy intensity of the GDP
- F/E is the emission intensity of energy

== Current trend and future projections ==
=== Global population (P) ===
Global population growth has been a defining trend of the modern era, shaped by demographic shifts, economic development, and social transformations. According to the United Nations World Population Prospects 2024, the world population surpassed 8 billion in 2022, driven largely by high birth rates in developing regions and improvements in healthcare and living standards.

In the 20th century, the global population grew at an unprecedented rate due to declining mortality rates and medical advancements. However, in recent decades, the growth rate has slowed as fertility rates decline in many parts of the world. The United Nations projects that the global population will continue to rise, reaching 9 billion by 2040, population growth is expected to peak at around 10.3 billion in the mid-2080s, after which it will gradually decline to about 10.2 billion by 2100, and urbanization is accelerating, with over 70% of people expected to live in urban areas by 2050, leading to higher energy consumption, particularly in rapidly developing regions such as India, China, and Indonesia.

Population growth patterns vary significantly across regions. Sub-Saharan Africa is expected to account for more than half of global population growth through 2054, due to sustained high fertility rates and improvements in healthcare. Next, Asia, particularly India and China, will experience slower growth, with China already having peaked in population size in 2024 and expected to decline in the coming decades. Lastly, Europe and North America are facing population stagnation or decline, with aging populations and fertility rates below replacement levels.

=== GDP per capita (G/P) ===
Global GDP per capita has been on a consistent upward trajectory, reflecting economic expansion across both developed and developing nations. However, this growth has not been evenly distributed. High-income countries have experienced slowing per capita growth, while middle-income and developing nations continue to close the gap. According to projections, global GDP per capita is expected to reach approximately $24,499 by 2050, a substantial increase from $16,176 in 2019.

Despite this overall growth, significant disparities will persist across regions. High-income countries, which had an average GDP per capita of $48,913 in 2019, are projected to see this figure rise to $62,269 by 2050. Meanwhile, lower middle-income countries are expected to experience a more substantial relative increase, with GDP per capita climbing from $7,012 in 2019 to $14,743 by 2050.

Emerging economies such as China and India are expected to play a crucial role in shaping future economic trends. China’s per capita GDP, which stood at $13,988 in 2019, is projected to grow to $32,266 by 2050, though at a moderated pace compared to previous decades. Similarly, India’s per capita GDP, while lower than China’s, is also projected to rise steadily, reaching approximately $15,431 by 2050.

At the lower end of the spectrum, low-income countries continue to face significant development challenges. Their GDP per capita is projected to increase from $1,940 in 2019 to $4,800 by 2050, reflecting strong percentage growth but still leaving them far behind wealthier nations. Africa, in particular, will see uneven economic progress, with GDP per capita projections ranging from $5,347 to $13,306 depending on economic conditions.

Several factors will shape the trajectory of GDP per capita in the coming decades. Technological advancements, energy efficiency improvements, and infrastructure development are expected to support economic expansion while mitigating resource consumption. However, geopolitical uncertainties, demographic shifts, and climate change will introduce risks that could slow long-term growth. Advanced economies will likely face challenges related to aging populations and declining productivity, whereas younger populations in emerging markets may benefit from demographic dividends, driving higher growth in those regions.

While global GDP per capita is projected to continue increasing, the pace of economic convergence between developing and developed nations will depend on policy decisions, investments in human capital, and the ability of governments to navigate structural economic challenges. Although the income gap between nations is expected to narrow, economic inequality will remain a central issue in global economic discussions throughout the 21st century.

=== Energy intensity of GDP (E/G) ===
Energy intensity of GDP, defined as the amount of energy consumed per unit of economic output, serves as a key metric for evaluating energy efficiency and conservation. Over the past decades, global energy intensity has generally declined, reflecting improvements in energy efficiency, technological advancements, and structural shifts in economies. However, the rate of decline varies significantly across regions and industries.

Currently, developed economies, such as Japan and European nations, exhibit lower energy intensity due to advanced energy-saving technologies, stringent policies, and a shift toward less energy-intensive industries. In contrast, developing economies, including China and India, still have relatively high energy intensity, mainly due to their industrial structures and reliance on energy-intensive sectors. When measured using market exchange rates (MER), the energy intensity of China is 6.2 times higher than that of Japan, while India's is 4.5 times higher. However, when adjusted for purchasing power parity (PPP), China's energy intensity reduces to 1.3 times that of Japan, and India's drops to 0.7 times Japan’s level, illustrating the impact of economic measurement methods on energy intensity comparisons.

Looking ahead, global energy intensity is projected to continue decreasing, driven by technological innovations, improved energy efficiency regulations, and shifts toward service-based economies. Developed economies are expected to maintain their downward trend due to advancements in energy-saving technologies and increased adoption of renewable energy sources. Meanwhile, developing nations will experience a gradual decline in energy intensity as they modernize industries and implement stricter energy policies.

=== Emission intensity of energy (F/E) ===
Carbon emission intensity of energy, defined as the amount of CO_{2} emitted per unit of energy consumed, is a crucial metric in assessing the environmental impact of energy production and consumption. Over the past decades, global energy-related CO_{2} emissions have increased significantly, rising by 87% from 18.0 billion tonnes in 1978 to 33.7 billion tonnes in 2018. However, the carbon intensity of the global energy supply has declined by 13%, from 66.3 kg CO_{2}/GJ in 1978 to 58.0 kg CO_{2}/GJ in 2018. This reduction is largely attributed to the increased use of renewable energy and nuclear power in the global energy mix.

Despite this decline in carbon intensity, fossil fuels still dominate the global energy sector. As of 2018, 85% of the total primary energy consumption was still covered by coal, oil, and gas, only a 7% decrease from 1978. The persistence of fossil fuels in the energy mix continues to drive high levels of carbon emissions.

The regional disparities in carbon intensity are also notable. Advanced economies, such as those in Europe and North America, have reduced their carbon intensity more significantly due to strict climate policies, technological advancements, and a shift towards cleaner energy sources. In contrast, developing economies like China and India still rely heavily on coal and other high-carbon energy sources, resulting in higher carbon intensities per unit of energy produced.

Looking ahead, the carbon intensity of energy is expected to continue decreasing, but the rate of decline will depend on policy decisions, technological developments, and market forces. According to the World Energy Council’s three scenario projections (Modern Jazz, Unfinished Symphony, and Hard Rock), the share of fossil fuels in total primary energy consumption will decrease to between 50% and 70% by 2060. At the same time, the share of renewables is expected to rise from 14% in 2015 to between 22% and 37% in 2060.

In the Modern Jazz scenario, a market-driven approach leads to rapid technological innovation, with renewable energy growth offsetting fossil fuel reliance. Carbon pricing is introduced gradually, leading to moderate reductions in carbon intensity. The Unfinished Symphony scenario envisions a government-led transition, emphasizing international cooperation, aggressive carbon pricing, and widespread adoption of low-carbon technologies, resulting in the fastest decline in carbon intensity. The Hard Rock scenario depicts a fragmented world with minimal climate cooperation, where fossil fuels remain dominant, and carbon intensity reductions are slowest due to protectionist policies and a lack of incentives for cleaner technologies.

== Use in IPCC reports ==
The Kaya identity plays a core role in the development of future emissions scenarios in the IPCC Special Report on Emissions Scenarios. The scenarios set out a range of assumed conditions for future development of each of the four inputs. Population growth projections are available independently from demographic research; GDP per capita trends are available from economic statistics and econometrics; similarly for energy intensity and emission levels. The projected carbon emissions can drive carbon cycle and climate models to predict future CO_{2} concentration and global warming and is also used in the broader literature on climate change.

== Other uses ==
- Bill Gates used a form of the Identity at a TED Talk called "Innovating to zero!". Writing in ThinkProgress, Joseph J. Romm disputed the validity of Gates' arguments, as well as clarifying the key idea behind the identity.

== See also ==
- Eco-economic decoupling
- Eco-efficiency
- Eco-sufficiency
- Global carbon reward
- Industrial ecology
- I = PAT
- Life cycle analysis
- Transport ecology
