= Agrowth =

Economic concept

Agrowth ("agnostic or atheistic about growth") is a concept in economic policy according to which it is preferable to be indifferent to the growth of gross domestic product (GDP growth) when devising policies to further economic and societal progress. The reasoning behind agrowth is that GDP growth does not correlate closely with such progress.

The concept has been particularly discussed in the context of environmental policy, where it is opposed to both green growth and degrowth. Agrowth is supported by many scientists.

For example, environmental economist Jeroen C. J. M. van den Bergh argues for an agnostic attitude toward economic growth. According to him, environmental policy should not be aimed at pursuing or avoiding growth in the hope of reducing environmental damage, but at direct deployment of effective instruments such as pricing externalities (for example, via environmental taxes or emission rights). Whether the economy grows, stagnates or shrinks as a result is of secondary importance.

== See also ==
- Climate policy
- Environmental economics
- Eco-economic decoupling
- Post-growth
- Sustainability
