= Global Green Growth Institute =

South Korea–based intergovernmental organization

- Abbreviation: GGGI
- Formation: 2010; 16 years ago
- Type: Intergovernmental organization
- Purpose: Supporting sustainable development of developing and emerging countries
- Headquarters: Seoul, Republic of Korea
- Coordinates: 37.567459°N 126.971078°E
- Fields: Sustainable development
- Members: 52 Member States (2019)
- Director-General: Sang-Hyup Kim
- Budget: US$56.88 million (2017)
- Website: gggi.org

The Global Green Growth Institute (GGGI) is an intergovernmental organization based in Seoul, South Korea. It is dedicated to promoting green growth, which integrates economic progress with environmental sustainability. It provides technical support, research opportunities, and stakeholder collaboration to develop green growth plans, focusing particularly on the needs of developing countries.

The activities are centered on four key areas: energy, water, land-use planning, and the development of sustainable urban environments, often referred to as green cities.

== History ==
GGGI originated as a think tank in 2010, initiated by then President of South Korea Lee Myung-bak. In 2012, GGGI was transformed into an international treaty-based organization, a change formalized at the Rio+20 Summit in Brazil.

GGGI operates under an agreement from its member countries established in 2012. The governance structure includes the Assembly, encompassing all member countries, and the Council, which is in charge of strategy, budget, and membership. An Advisory Committee of experts also contributes strategic guidance. Membership in GGGI is open to any United Nations member state aligned with its green growth objectives.
