= Marco Janssen =

Dutch econometrist

Marcus Alexander "Marco" Janssen (born 1969) is a Dutch American econometrician and Professor at the Arizona State University and Director of its Center for Behavior, Institutions, and the Environment. He is known for his work on the modelling of socio-ecological systems.

== Life and work ==
Janssen was born in Hendrik-Ido-Ambacht. Janssen obtained his MA in Econometrics and Operations Research at Erasmus University Rotterdam in 1992. He received his PhD in Mathematics at Maastricht University in 1996 under the supervision of J. Rotmans and O.J. Vrieze with the dissertation "Meeting targets: tools to support integrated assessment modelling of global change".

After his graduation, Janssen started his academic career as a Postdoctoral Research Fellow at the Department of Spatial Economics of the Vrije Universiteit Amsterdam. In 2002, he moved to the United States, where he became a Research Scientist for the Center for the Study of Institutions, Population and Environmental Change (CIPEC) at Indiana University. In 2005, he moved to Arizona State University, where he started as an Assistant Professor in the School of Human Evolution and Social Change, and became an Associate Professor in 2010, and a Professor at the School of Sustainability in 2015. From 2006 to 2010, he was also Associate Director of its Center for the Study of Institutional Diversity, and since 2010, Director of this Center, which was renamed in 2015 into the Center for Behavior, Institutions and the Environment.

Janssen research interests are in the field of the "interaction of behavioral, institutional and ecological processes... how people, their institutional rules and the environment they live in fit together in the past, present and the future, from local scales to the global scale," and has developed "formal (computational) models of social and social-ecological systems, and perform controlled experiments in the lab and field, and study case study material to test the stylized models," and particularly on agent-based modeling and institutional analysis.

== Selected publications ==
- J.C.J.M. van den Bergh and M.A. Janssen (eds.) (2005). Economics of Industrial Ecology: Use of Materials, Structural Change and Spatial Scales. The MIT Press.
- Poteete, Amy R., Marco A. Janssen, and Elinor Ostrom. Working together: collective action, the commons, and multiple methods in practice. Princeton University Press, 2010.
- Anderies, J. M.; Janssen, M. A. (2016) [First published 2013]. Sustaining the Commons (2nd ed.). Tempe, Arizona: Center for the Study of Institutional Diversity, Arizona State University. OCLC 953998906 (all editions).

Articles, a selection:

- Parker, D. C.; Manson, S. M.; Janssen, M. A.; Hoffmann, M. J.; Deadman, P. (2003). "Multi-agent systems for the simulation of land-use and land-cover change: a review" (PDF). Annals of the Association of American Geographers. 93 (2): 314–337. Bibcode:2003AAAG...93..314P. doi:10.1111/1467-8306.9302004. Archived from the original (PDF) on Jul 1, 2015 – via ERI Publication Repository.
- Anderies, John M., Marco A. Janssen, and Elinor Ostrom. "A framework to analyze the robustness of social-ecological systems from an institutional perspective". Ecology and society 9.1 (2004): 18.
- Young, O. R., Berkhout, F., Gallopin, G. C., Janssen, M. A., Ostrom, E., & van der Leeuw, S. (2006). "The globalization of socio-ecological systems: An agenda for scientific research". Global Environmental Change, 16(3), 304–316.
- Ostrom, Elinor, Marco A. Janssen, and John M. Anderies. "Going beyond panaceas". Proceedings of the National Academy of Sciences 104.39 (2007): 15176–15178.
