= I = PAT =

Equates human impact on the environment

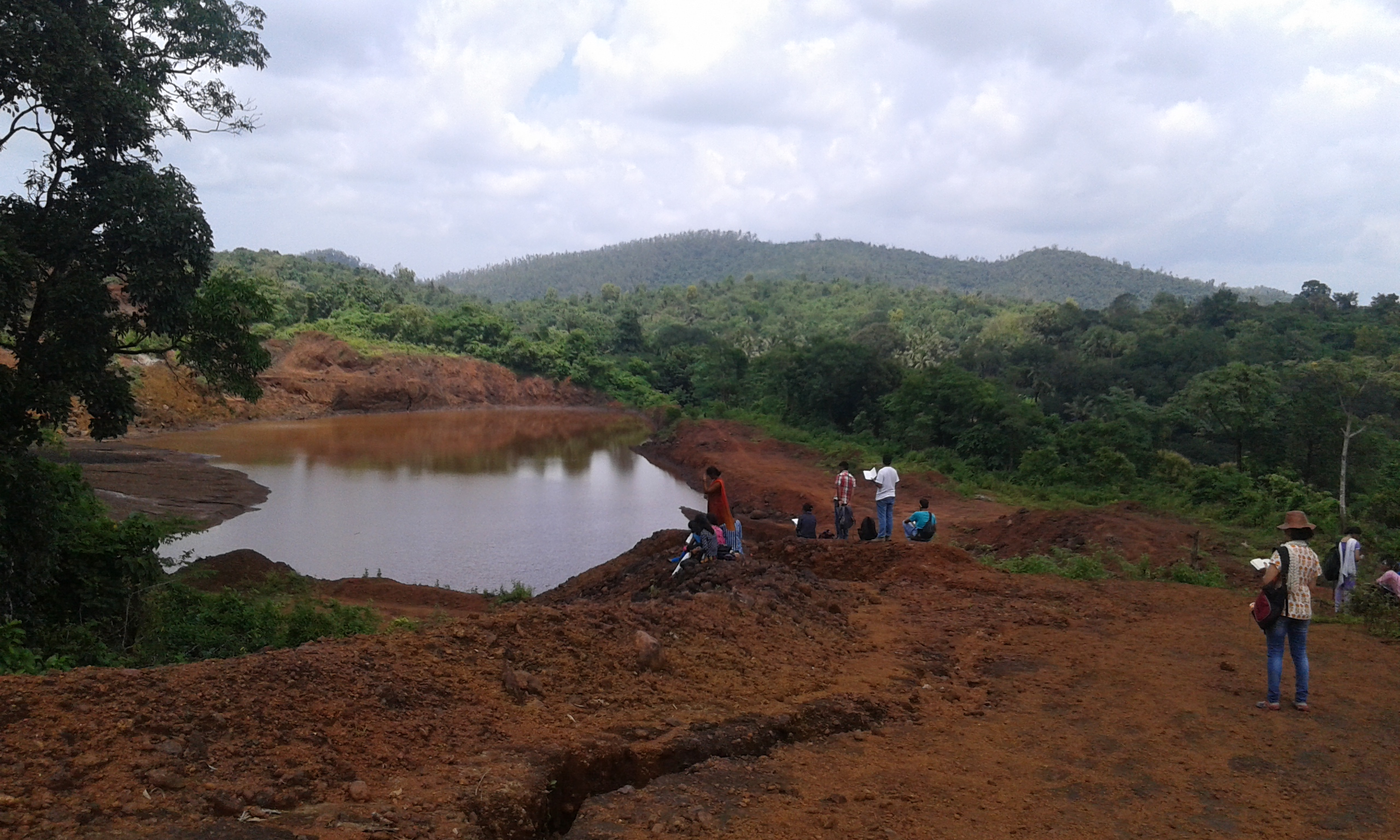
Studying the impact of mining on environment and village community

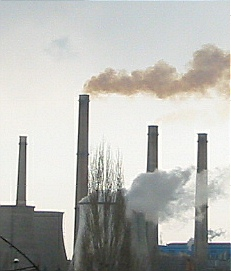
Pollution from a factory

I = PAT is the mathematical notation of a formula put forward to describe the impact of human activity on the environment.

I = P × A × T

The expression equates human impact (I) on the environment to a function of three factors: population (P), affluence (A) and technology (T). It is similar in form to the Kaya identity, which applies specifically to emissions of the greenhouse gas carbon dioxide.

The validity of expressing environmental impact as a simple product of independent factors, and the factors that should be included and their comparative importance, have been the subject of debate among environmentalists. In particular, some have drawn attention to potential inter-relationships among the three factors; and others have wished to stress other factors not included in the formula, such as political and social structures, and the scope for beneficial, as well as harmful, environmental actions.

== History ==
The equation was developed in 1970 during the course of a debate between Barry Commoner, Paul R. Ehrlich and John Holdren. Commoner argued that environmental impacts in the United States were caused primarily by changes in its production technology following World War II and focused on present-day deteriorating environmental conditions in the United States. Ehrlich and Holdren argued that all three factors were important but emphasized the role of human population growth, focusing on a broader scale, being less specific in space and time.

The equation can aid in understanding some of the factors affecting human impacts on the environment, but it has also been cited as a basis for a number of the dire environmental predictions of the 1970s by Paul Ehrlich, George Wald, Denis Hayes, Lester Brown, René Dubos, and Sidney Ripley that did not come to pass. Neal Koblitz classified equations of this type as "mathematical propaganda" and criticized Ehrlich's use of them in the media (e.g. on The Tonight Show) to sway the general public.

== The dependent variable: Impact ==
The variable "I" in the "I=PAT" equation represents environmental impact. The environment may be viewed as a self-regenerating system that can endure a certain level of impact. The maximum endurable impact is called the carrying capacity. As long as "I" is less than the carrying capacity the associated population, affluence, and technology that make up "I" can be perpetually endured. If "I" exceeds the carrying capacity, then the system is said to be in overshoot, which may only be a temporary state. Overshoot may degrade the ability of the environment to endure impact, therefore reducing the carrying capacity.

Impact may be measured using ecological footprint analysis in units of global hectares (gha). Ecological footprint per capita is a measure of the quantity of Earth's biologically productive surface that is needed to regenerate the resources consumed per capita.

Impact is modeled as the product of three terms, giving gha as a result. Population is expressed in human numbers; therefore affluence is measured in units of gha per capita. Technology is a unitless efficiency factor.

== The three factors ==
=== Population ===
Population (est.) 10,000 BC – 2000 AD

In the I=PAT equation, the variable P represents the population of an area, such as the world. Since the rise of industrial societies, human population has been increasing exponentially. This has caused Thomas Malthus, Paul Ehrlich and others to postulate that this growth would continue until checked by widespread hunger and famine (see Malthusian growth model).

The United Nations project that world population will increase from 7.7 billion today (2019) to 9.8 billion in 2050 and about 11.2 billion in 2100.

These projections take into consideration that population growth has slowed in recent years as women are having fewer children. This phenomenon is the result of demographic transition all over the world. Although the UN projects that human population may stabilize at around 11.2 billion in 2100, the I=PAT equation will continue to be relevant for the increasing human impact on the environment in the short to mid-term future.

==== Environmental impacts of population ====
Increased population increases humans' environmental impact in multiple ways, which include but are not limited to:

- Increased land use – Results in habitat loss for other species
- Increased resource use – Results in changes in land cover
- Increased pollution – Can cause sickness and damages ecosystems
- Increased climate change
- Increased biodiversity loss

=== Affluence ===
World GDP per capita (in 1990 Geary–Khamis dollars)

The variable A in the I=PAT equation stands for affluence. It represents the average consumption of each person in the population. As the consumption of each person increases, the total environmental impact increases as well. A common proxy for measuring consumption is through GDP per capita or GNI per capita. While GDP per capita measures production, it is often assumed that consumption increases when production increases. GDP per capita has been rising steadily over the last few centuries and is driving up human impact in the I=PAT equation.

==== Environmental impacts of affluence ====
Increased consumption significantly increases human environmental impact. This is because each product consumed has wide-ranging effects on the environment. For example, the construction of a car has the following environmental impacts:

- 605,664 gallons of water for parts and tires;
- 682 lbs. of pollution at a mine for the lead battery;
- 2178 lbs. of discharge into water supply for the 22 lbs. of copper contained in the car.

The more cars per capita, the greater the impact. Ecological impacts of each product are far-reaching; increases in consumption quickly result in large impacts on the environment through direct and indirect sources.

=== Technology ===
The T variable in the I=PAT equation represents how resource intensive the production of affluence is; how much environmental impact is involved in creating, transporting and disposing of the goods, services and amenities used. Improvements in efficiency can reduce resource intensiveness, reducing the T multiplier. Since technology can affect environmental impact in multiple different ways, the unit for T is often tailored for the situation to which I=PAT is being applied. For example, for a situation where the human impact on climate change is being measured, an appropriate unit for T might be greenhouse gas emissions per unit of GDP.

==== Environmental impacts of technology ====
Increases in efficiency from technologies can reduce specific environmental impacts, but due to increasing prosperity these technologies yield for the people and businesses that adopt them, technologies actually end up generating greater overall growth into the resources that sustain us.

== Criticism ==
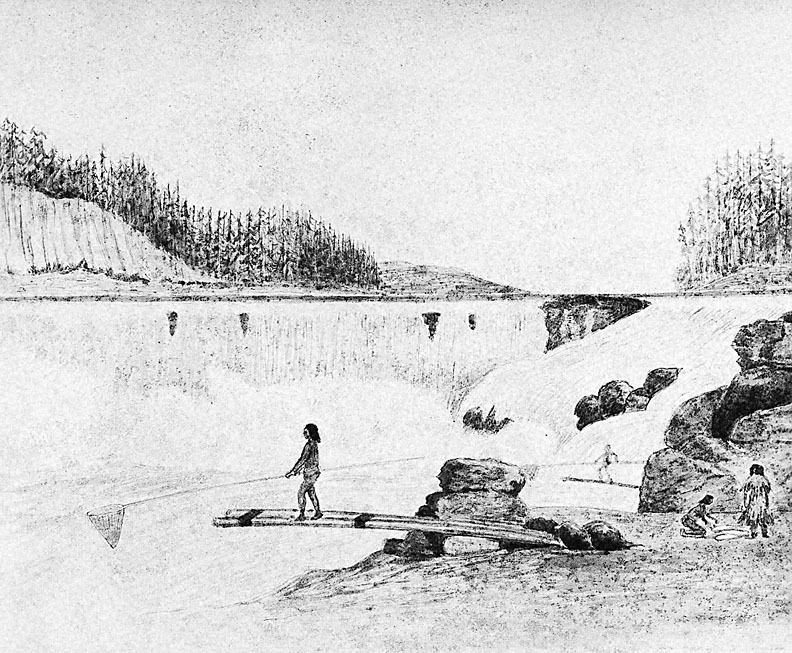
Native American fishing practices (low technology) have a vastly smaller impact than industrialized fishing.

Criticisms of the I=PAT formula:

- Too simplistic for complex problem
- Interdependencies between variables
- General sweeping assumptions of variables' effect toward environmental impact
- Cultural differences cause wide variation in impact
- Technology cannot properly be expressed in a unit. Varying the unit will prove to be inaccurate, as the result of the calculation depends on one's view of the situation.

=== Interdependencies ===
The I=PAT equation has been criticized for being too simplistic by assuming that P, A, and T are independent of each other. In reality, at least seven interdependencies between P, A, and T could exist, indicating that it is more correct to rewrite the equation as I = f(P,A,T). For example, a doubling of technological efficiency, or equivalently a reduction of the T-factor by 50%, does not necessarily reduce the environmental impact (I) by 50% if efficiency induced price reductions stimulate additional consumption of the resource that was supposed to be conserved, a phenomenon called the rebound effect or Jevons paradox. As was shown by Alcott, despite significant improvements in the carbon intensity of GDP (i.e., the efficiency in carbon use) since 1980, world fossil energy consumption has increased in line with economic and population growth. Similarly, an extensive historical analysis of technological efficiency improvements has conclusively shown that improvements in the efficiency of energy and material use were almost always outpaced by economic growth, resulting in a net increase in resource use and associated pollution.

Each factor in the I=PAT equation can either increase or decrease the level of environmental impact, and their interactions are non-linear and dynamic. Although environmental impacts are driven by human activities in specific regions, these impacts often manifest elsewhere due to the globalized nature of environmental systems and human. For instance, economic activity in one area can lead to resource extraction in another or cause pollution that spreads to different locations.

=== Neglect of beneficial human impacts ===
There have also been comments that this model depicts people as being purely detrimental to the environment, ignoring any conservation or restoration efforts that societies have made.

=== Neglect of political and social contexts ===
Another major criticism of the I=PAT model is that it ignores the political context and decision-making structures of countries and groups. This means the equation does not account for varying degrees of power, influence, and responsibility of individuals over environmental impact. Also, the P factor does not account for the complexity of social structures or behaviors, resulting in blame being placed on the global poor. I=PAT does not account for sustainable resource use among some poor and indigenous populations, unfairly characterizing these populations whose cultures support low-impact practices. However, it has been argued that the latter criticism not only assumes low impacts for indigenous populations, but also misunderstands the I=PAT equation itself.

Environmental impact is a function of human numbers, affluence (i.e., resources consumed per capita) and technology. It is assumed that small-scale societies have low environmental impacts due to their practices and orientations alone but there is little evidence to support this. In fact, the generally low impact of small-scale societies compared to state societies is due to a combination of their small numbers and low-level technology. Thus, the environmental sustainability of these societies is largely an epiphenomenon due their inability to significantly affect their environment. That all types of societies are subject to I=PAT was actually made clear in Ehrlich and Holdren's 1972 dialogue with Commoner in The Bulletin of the Atomic Scientists, where they examine the pre-industrial (and indeed prehistoric) impact of human beings on the environment. Their position is further clarified by Holdren's 1993 paper, A Brief History of "IPAT".

=== Policy implications ===
As a result of the interdependencies between P, A, and T and potential rebound effects, policies aimed at decreasing environmental impacts through reductions in P, A, and T may not only be very difficult to implement (e.g., population control and material sufficiency and degrowth movements have been controversial) but also are likely to be rather ineffective compared to rationing (i.e., quotas) or Pigouvian taxation of resource use or pollution.

== World3 model and IPAT Equation ==
The IPAT equation serves as the cornerstone for analyzing the causes of environmental sustainability. It underpins the entire World3 simulation model, which is the most influential sustainability model ever created, and is essentially an extended application of the IPAT equation.

== See also ==
- Carbon footprint
- Eco-economic decoupling
- Ecological indicator
- Embodied energy
- Life cycle assessment
- Sustainability measurement
- Sustainability metrics and indices
- Water footprint
