= Jeroen C. J. M. van den Bergh =

Dutch environmental economist

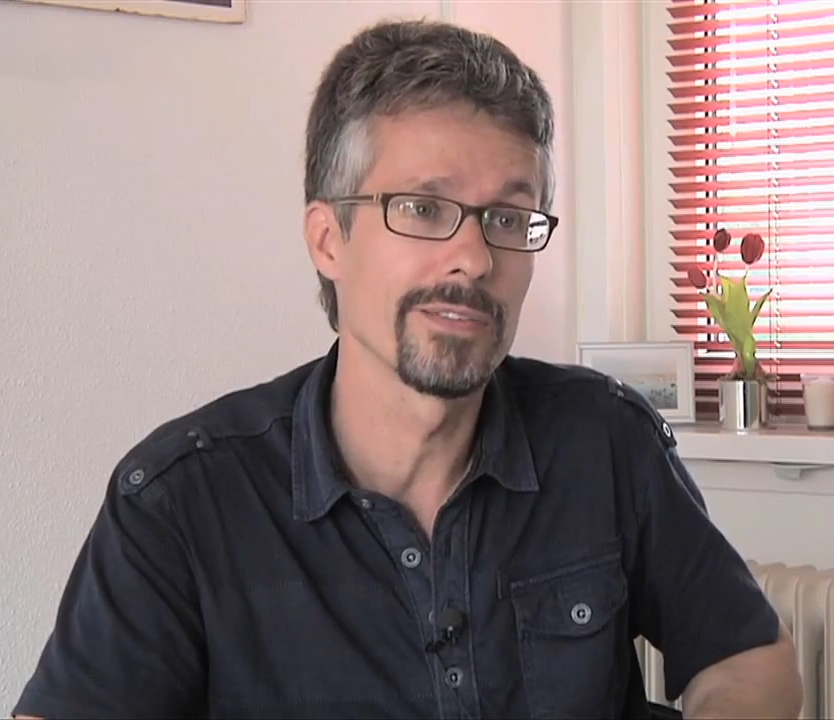
van den Bergh, 2011

Jeroen C.J.M. van den Bergh (born August 1, 1965) is an environmental economist of Dutch origin. He is ICREA Research Professor at Universitat Autònoma de Barcelona and deputy director for Research of its Institute of Environmental Science and Technology, and professor of Environmental and Resource Economics at VU University Amsterdam.

== Academic career and activities ==
Van den Bergh earned a master's degree in Econometrics and Operations Research from Tilburg University in 1988 and a doctorate in economics from Vrije Universiteit Amsterdam in 1991. In July 1997 he was appointed professor of Environmental Economics in the Faculty of Economics and Business Administration at VU and in 2002 he also became a professor in the Institute for Environmental Studies of VU. In 2002 he was awarded the annual Royal Dutch/Shell Prize (Koninklijke/Shell Prijs) with a purse of 100,000 euros by the Royal Netherlands Academy of Arts and Sciences, for his research related to sustainable development and energy. In September 2007 he was appointed ICREA Research Professor at Universitat Autònoma de Barcelona (UAB), and honorary professor of Environmental and Resource Economics at VU. In 2010 he became the editor-in-chief of the Elsevier journal Environmental Innovation and Societal Transitions. From 2003 to 2007 he was a member of the Energy Council of The Netherlands. In 2004 he was appointed a member of the scientific advisory board of the Austrian Institute of Economic Research. In 2016 he was appointed Member of the Board of Directors of the Beijer Institute of Ecological Economics. On 26 September 2019 the Open University of the Netherlands awarded him an honorary doctorate (“eredoctoraat” in Dutch).

According to his ICREA profile page as of March 2015, his research is on "the intersection of economics, environmental science and innovation studies. Past work includes dematerialization and recycling, ecological-economic modelling, construction of aggregate economic and environmental performance indicators, the growth-versus-environment debate, and spatial/international aspects of environmental policy. Work in recent years involves evolutionary economics, environmental innovation, and economic analysis of climate policy and a transition to a low-carbon economy."

As of October 2025 he had published more than 280 papers and (co-)authored or edited 17 books.

According to RePEc, in October 2025 van den Bergh was ranked #10 among the 2,794 economists of Spain. As of March 2015 he is a member of the Academia Europaea.

== Views ==
According to a scientific paper of van den Bergh, degrowth is often seen as an ambiguous concept due to its various interpretations, which can lead to confusion rather than a clear and constructive debate on environmental policy. Many interpretations of degrowth do not offer effective strategies for reducing environmental impact or transitioning to a sustainable economy. Additionally, degrowth is unlikely to gain significant social or political support, making it an ineffective strategy for achieving environmental sustainability.

In his paper, van den Bergh highlights that a focus solely on reducing consumption (or consumption degrowth) may lead to rebound effects. For instance, reducing consumption of certain goods and services might result in an increase in spending on other items, as disposable income remains unchanged. Alternatively, it could lead to savings, which would provide additional funds for others to borrow and spend.

He emphasizes the importance of (global) environmental policies, such as pricing externalities through environmental taxes or tradable permits, which incentivize behavior changes that reduce environmental impact and which provide essential information for consumers and help manage rebound effects.

Van den Bergh argues for an agnostic attitude toward economic growth, called agrowth. According to him, environmental policy should not be aimed at pursuing or avoiding growth in the hope of reducing environmental damage, but at direct deployment of effective instruments such as pricing externalities (for example, via carbon taxes or emission rights). Whether the economy grows, stagnates or shrinks as a result is of no importance.

== Selected books ==
- Jeroen C. J. M. van den Bergh (2018). Human Evolution Beyond Biology and Culture: Evolutionary Social, Environmental and Policy Sciences. Cambridge University Press. doi:10.1017/9781108564922. ISBN 9781108564922. S2CID 240166069.
- J.C.J.M. van den Bergh (ed.) (1999), Handbook of Environmental and Resource Economics. Edward Elgar Publ., Cheltenham, UK ISBN 978-1843762362
- J.C.J.M. van den Bergh, A. Barendregt and A. Gilbert (2004). Spatial Ecological-Economic Analysis for Wetland Management: Modelling and Scenario Evaluation of Land Use, Cambridge University Press. ISBN 978-1107405110
- J.C.J.M. van den Bergh and M.A. Janssen (eds.) (2005). Economics of Industrial Ecology: Use of Materials, Structural Change and Spatial Scales. The MIT Press. ISBN 978-0262220712
- J.C.J.M. van den Bergh, J. Hoekstra, R. Imeson, P. Nunes and A. de Blaeij (2006). Economic Modeling and Policy Analysis of Exploited Marine Ecosystems. Springer. ISBN 978-140204041-2
- J.C.J.M. van den Bergh, A. Faber, A.M. Idenburg and F.H. Oosterhuis (2007). Evolutionary Economics and Environmental Policy: Survival of the Greenest. Edward Elgar. ISBN 978-1845429553

== Selected articles ==
As of March 2015 the five most cited articles in Google Scholar by Van den Bergh were:

- van den Bergh, JCJM; Verbruggen, H (1999). "Spatial sustainability, trade and indicators: an evaluation of the 'ecological footprint'". Ecological Economics. 29 (1): 61–72. Bibcode:1999EcoEc..29...61V. doi:10.1016/S0921-8009(99)00032-4. ISSN 0921-8009.
- De Bruyn, SM; van den Bergh, JCJM; Opschoor, JB (1998). "Economic growth and emissions: reconsidering the empirical basis of environmental Kuznets curves". Ecological Economics. 25 (2): 161–175. Bibcode:1998EcoEc..25..161D. doi:10.1016/S0921-8009(97)00178-X.
- Nunes, PALD; van den Bergh, JCJM (2001). "Economic valuation of biodiversity: sense or nonsense?". Ecological Economics. 39 (2): 203–222. Bibcode:2001EcoEc..39..203N. doi:10.1016/S0921-8009(01)00233-6.
- Turner, RK; van den Bergh, JCJM; Söderqvist, T; Barendregt, A (2000). "Ecological-economic analysis of wetlands: scientific integration for management and policy". Ecological Economics. 35 (1): 7–23. doi:10.1007/s10584-009-9719-7.
- van Beers, C; van den Bergh, JCJM (1997). "An empirical multi-country analysis of the impact of environmental regulations on foreign trade flows". Kyklos. 50 (1): 29–46. doi:10.1111/1467-6435.00002.
