= Degrowth =

Philosophy calling for reduced consumption and production to achieve sustainability

Degrowth is an academic and social movement, predominantly in Europe, aimed at the planned and democratic reduction of production and consumption as a solution to social-ecological crises. Commonly cited policy goals of degrowth include reducing the environmental impact of human activities, redistributing income and wealth within and between countries, and encouraging a shift from materialistic values to a convivial and participatory society. According to degrowth theorists, degrowth is a multi-layered concept that combines critiques of capitalism, colonialism, productivism, and utilitarianism, while envisioning more caring, just, convivial, happy, and democratic societies.

Degrowth is critical of the concept of growth in gross domestic product as a measure of human and economic development. It argues that modern capitalism's unitary focus on growth causes widespread ecological damage and is unnecessary for the further increase of human living standards. Degrowth theorists posit that degrowth would increase human living standards and ecological preservation even as GDP growth slows or reverses.

Degrowth, an unorthodox school of thought, occupies a niche in academic literature and faces substantial criticism. Critics describe it as a vague concept that fails to offer an effective strategy for reducing environmental harm, ignores rebound effects, and has little social or political support, whereas price incentives through environmental taxes or tradable permits are much more effective. Critics also note that far-reaching degrowth scenarios are projected to increase extreme poverty, with no historical precedent of the poorest benefiting in a shrinking economy. Systematic reviews describe degrowth research as largely normative opinions rather than analysis, with most proposals lacking precision, depth, and concrete policy design, and rarely using quantitative or qualitative data, formal modelling, or representative samples, while empirical and system-wide analyses remain scarce.

Degrowth is closely associated with eco-socialism and eco-anarchism. Alternatives to degrowth include green growth (economic growth and sustainability are deemed compatible) and agrowth (agnostic on growth, focusing on reducing environmental harm through effective instruments, regardless of whether the economy is growing, stagnant, or contracting).

== Background ==
The "degrowth" movement arose from concerns over the consequences of the productivism and consumerism associated with industrial societies (whether capitalist or socialist) including:

- The reduced availability of energy sources (see peak oil);
- The destabilization of Earth's ecosystems upon which all life on Earth depends (see Holocene Extinction, Anthropocene, global warming, pollution, current biodiversity loss, planetary boundaries);
- The rise of negative societal side-effects (unsustainable development, poorer health, poverty, social inequality); and
- The ever-expanding use of resources by Global North countries to satisfy lifestyles that consume more food and energy, and produce greater waste, at the expense of the Global South (see neocolonialism).

A 2025 review of research literature on degrowth concluded that degrowth scholars are skeptical of the feasibility of achieving an equitable economic slowdown within a capitalist framework. This skepticism stems from the structural reliance of capitalism on continuous growth driven by competition. As a result, degrowth advocates argue for a deliberate and democratically guided overhaul of the economic system. Such a transformation aims to significantly reduce environmental harm, address inequality, and enhance overall well-being.

=== Decoupling ===
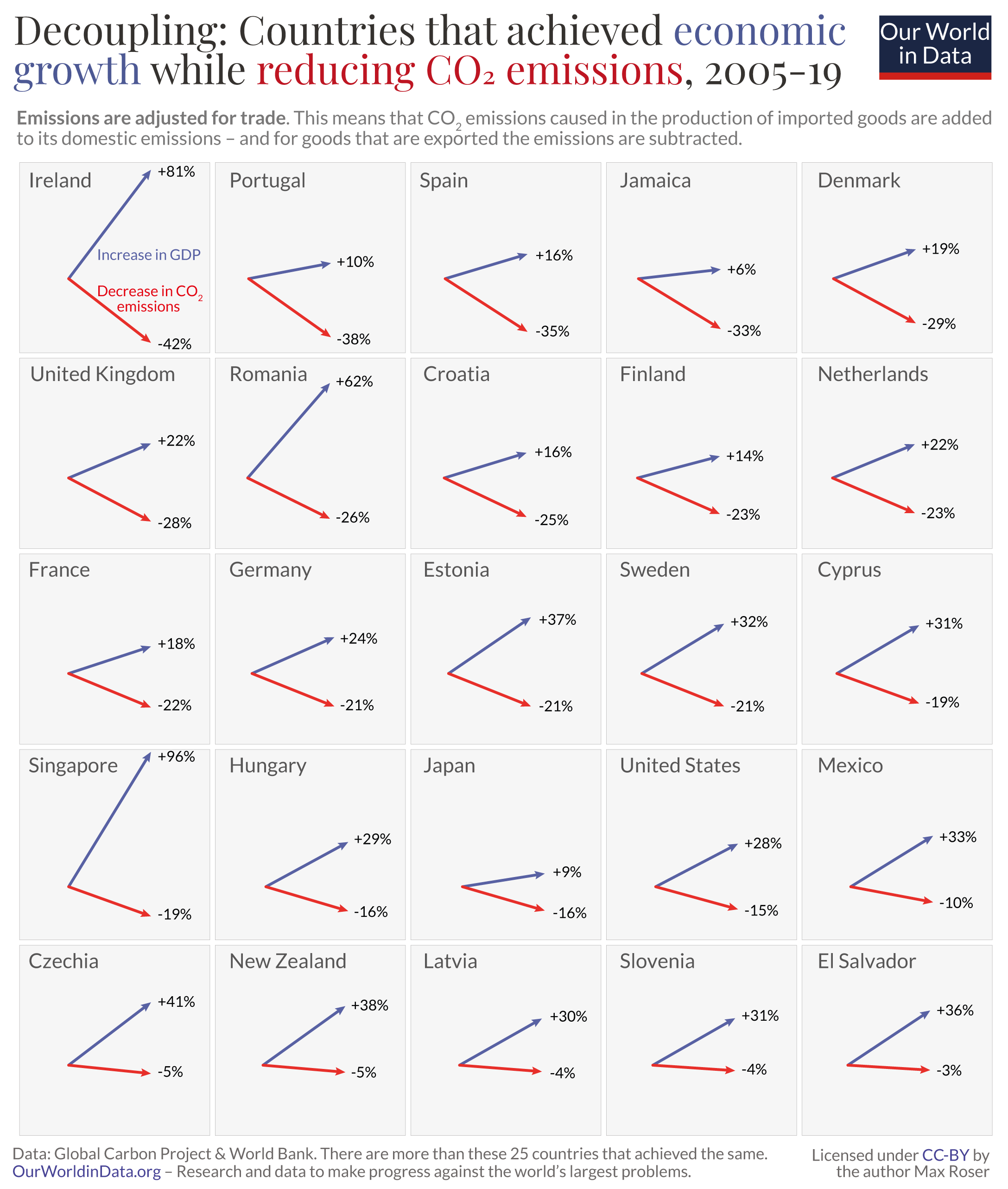
Examples of countries with absolute eco-economic decoupling

The concept of decoupling denotes decoupling economic growth, usually measured in GDP growth, GDP per capita growth or GNI per capita growth from the use of natural resources and greenhouse gas (GHG) emissions. Absolute decoupling refers to GDP growth coinciding with a reduction in natural resource use and GHG emissions, while relative decoupling describes an increase in resource use and GHG emissions lower than the increase in GDP growth. The degrowth movement heavily critiques this idea and argues that absolute decoupling is only possible for short periods, specific locations, or with small mitigation rates. In 2021, the NGO European Environmental Bureau stated that there is "no empirical evidence supporting the existence of a decoupling of economic growth from environmental pressures on anywhere near the scale needed to deal with environmental breakdown", and that reported cases of existing eco-economic decouplings either depict relative decoupling and/or are observed only temporarily and/or only on a local scale, arguing that alternatives to eco-economic decoupling are needed. This is supported by several other studies which state that absolute decoupling is highly unlikely to be achieved fast enough to prevent global warming over 1.5 °C or 2 °C, even under optimistic policy conditions.

In a review paper Hickel and Kallis argue that green growth lacks empirical validity, citing evidence that high-income nations cannot achieve absolute reductions in resource use or cut emissions fast enough to stay within the 2 °C carbon budget while pursuing GDP growth at historical rates. Environmental scientist Rikard Warlenius argues in the scientific journal Ecological Economics that the pessimistic assessment of Hickel regarding decoupling is not based on robust arguments but rather on mystifications of what decoupling entails. They assume a maximum annual reduction in the carbon intensity of GDP of 4%, combined with the notion that global GDP must decline or converge. Based on these assumptions, limiting global warming to 1.5 °C would be impossible, and even the 2 °C target would only be achievable if high-income countries reduced their economies by more than 90%, and middle-income countries by around 70%. However, such a scenario is widely considered politically unrealistic, which could in turn jeopardize the climate targets themselves. Warlenius also finds their pessimism unfounded, noting that decoupling above 4% has already occurred and that there is no reason strong policy measures could not achieve even higher rates. Warlenius finds it surprising that scholars such as Hickel and Kallis could not imagine more "aggressive policies" than those used in their model. Under normal conditions, economic growth increases emissions (while carbon intensity declines), and degrowth (recession) stabilizes emissions. At the same time, however, growth is likely better positioned than degrowth to create the conditions necessary for ambitious climate action, such as the deep, transformative, and costly transitions outlined by the IPCC.

=== Resource depletion ===
Degrowth proponents argue that economic expansion must be met with a corresponding increase in resource consumption. Degrowth can be interpreted as a plea for resource reallocation, aiming to halt unsustainable practices of transforming certain entities into resources, such as non-renewable natural resources. Instead, the focus shifts towards identifying and utilizing alternative resources, such as renewable human capabilities.

=== Sustainable development ===
Degrowth ideology opposes all manifestations of productivism, which advocates that economic productivity and growth should be the primary objectives of human organization. Consequently, it stands in opposition to the prevailing model of sustainable development.

Critics of degrowth argue that a slowing of economic growth would result in increased unemployment, increased poverty, and decreased income per capita. Many who believe in negative environmental consequences of growth still advocate for economic growth in the South, even if not in the North. Slowing economic growth would fail to deliver the benefits of degrowth — self-sufficiency and material responsibility — and would indeed lead to decreased employment. Rather, degrowth proponents advocate the complete abandonment of the current (growth) economic model, suggesting that relocalizing and abandoning the global economy in the Global South would allow people of the South to become more self-sufficient and would end the overconsumption and exploitation of Southern resources by the North. Supporters of degrowth view it as a potential method to shield ecosystems from human exploitation. Within this concept, there is an emphasis on communal stewardship of the environment, fostering a symbiotic relationship between humans and nature. Degrowth recognizes ecosystems as valuable entities beyond their utility as mere sources of resources. During the Second International Conference on degrowth in 2010, discussions encompassed concepts like implementing a maximum wage and promoting open borders. Degrowth advocates an ethical shift that challenges the notion that high-resource consumption lifestyles are desirable. Additionally, alternative perspectives on degrowth include addressing perceived historical injustices perpetrated by the Global North through centuries of colonization and exploitation, advocating for wealth redistribution. Determining the appropriate scale of action remains a focal point of debate within degrowth movements.

Some researchers believe that the world is poised to experience a Great Transformation, either by disastrous events or intentional design. They maintain that ecological economics must incorporate Postdevelopment theories, Buen vivir, and degrowth to affect the change necessary to avoid these potentially catastrophic events.

A 2022 paper by Mark Diesendorf found that limiting global warming to 1.5 °C with no overshoot would require a reduction of energy consumption. It describes (chapters 4–5) degrowth toward a steady state economy as possible and probably positive. The study ends with the words: "The case for a transition to a steady-state economy with low throughput and low emissions, initially in the high-income economies and then in rapidly growing economies, needs more serious attention and international cooperation."

=== "Rebound effect" ===
Technologies designed to reduce resource use and improve efficiency are often touted as sustainable or green solutions. Degrowth literature, however, warns about these technological advances due to the "rebound effect", also known as Jevons paradox. This concept is based on observations that when a less resource-exhaustive technology is introduced, behavior surrounding the use of that technology may change, and consumption of that technology could increase or even offset any potential resource savings. In light of the rebound effect, proponents of degrowth hold that the only effective "sustainable" solutions must involve a complete rejection of the growth paradigm and a move to a degrowth paradigm. There are also fundamental limits to technological solutions in the pursuit of degrowth, as all engagements with technology increase the cumulative matter-energy throughput. However, the convergence of digital commons of knowledge and design with distributed manufacturing technologies may arguably hold potential for building degrowth future scenarios.

=== Mitigation of climate change and determinants of 'growth' ===
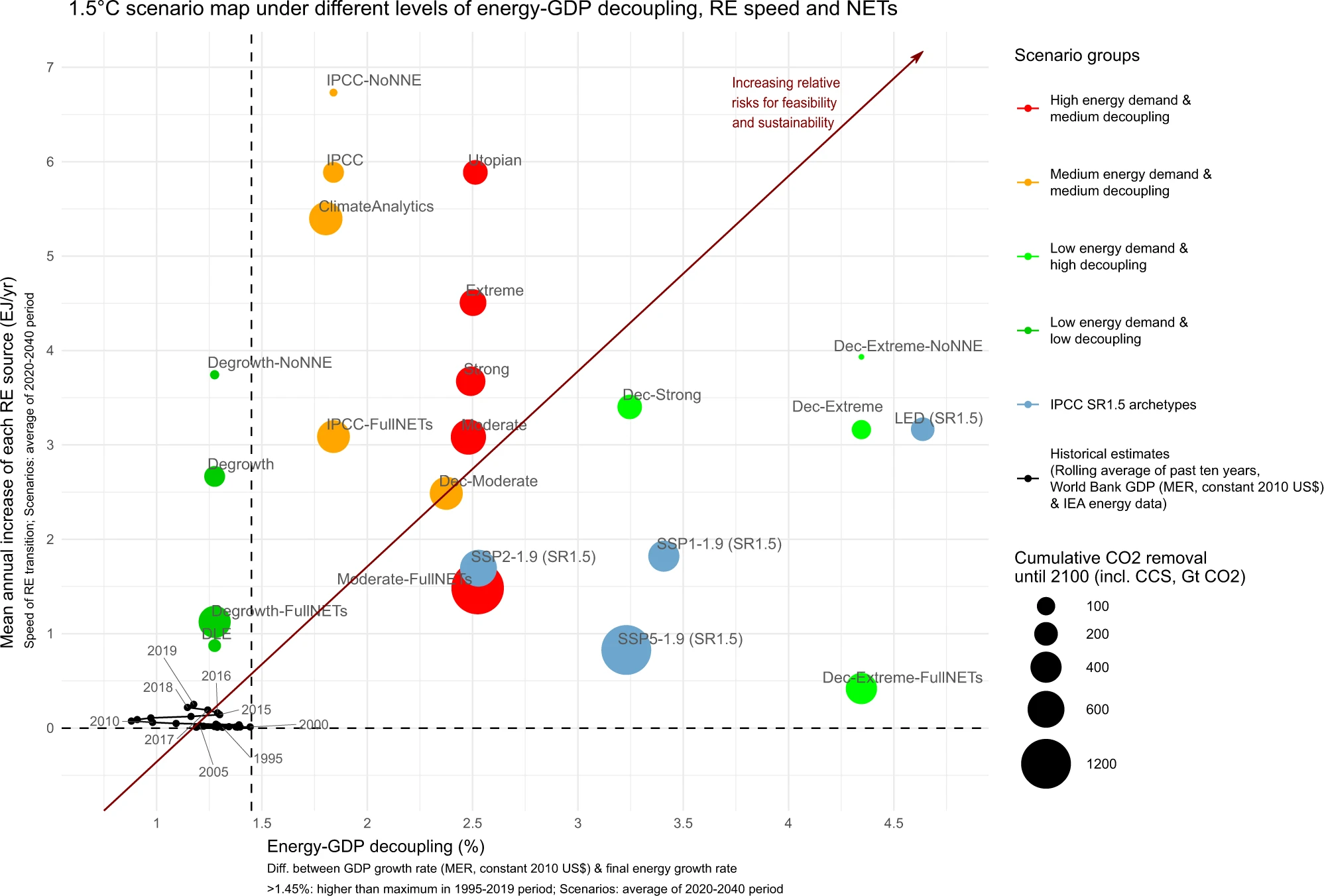
1.5 °C scenario map under different levels of energy-GDP decoupling, RE speed and NETs

Scientists report that degrowth scenarios, where economic output either "declines" or declines in terms of contemporary economic metrics such as current GDP, have been neglected in considerations of 1.5 °C scenarios reported by the Intergovernmental Panel on Climate Change (IPCC), finding that investigated degrowth scenarios "minimize many key risks for feasibility and sustainability compared to technology-driven pathways" with a core problem of such being feasibility in the context of contemporary decision-making of politics and globalized rebound- and relocation-effects. A study concluded that public services are associated with higher human need satisfaction and lower energy requirements while contemporary forms of economic growth are linked with the opposite, with the contemporary economic system being fundamentally misaligned with the twin goals of meeting human needs and ensuring ecological sustainability, suggesting that prioritizing human well-being and ecological sustainability would be preferable to overgrowth in current metrics of economic growth.

=== Open Localism ===
Degrowth's ideas around open localism share similarities with ideas around the commons while also having clear differences. On the one hand, open localism promotes localized, common production in cooperative-like styles similar to some versions of how commons are organized. On the other hand, open localism does not impose any set of rules or regulations creating a defined boundary, rather it favours a cosmopolitan approach.

=== Feminism ===
The degrowth movement builds on feminist economics that has criticized measures of economic growth like the GDP as it excludes work mainly done by women such as unpaid care work (the work performed to fulfill people's needs) and reproductive work (the work sustaining life), first argued by Marilyn Waring. Further, degrowth draws on the critique of socialist feminists like Silvia Federici and Nancy Fraser claiming that capitalist growth builds on the exploitation of women's work. Instead of devaluing it, degrowth centers the economy around care, proposing that care work should be organized as a commons.

Centering care goes hand in hand with changing society's time regimes. Degrowth scholars propose a working time reduction. As this does not necessarily lead to gender justice, the redistribution of care work has to be equally pushed. A concrete proposal by Frigga Haug is the 4-in-1 perspective that proposes 4 hours of wage work per day, freeing time for 4 hours of care work, 4 hours of political activities in a direct democracy, and 4 hours of personal development through learning.

Furthermore, degrowth draws on materialist ecofeminisms that state the parallel of the exploitation of women and nature in growth-based societies and proposes a subsistence perspective conceptualized by Maria Mies and Ariel Salleh. Synergies and opportunities for cross-fertilization between degrowth and feminism were proposed in 2022, through networks including the Feminisms and Degrowth Alliance (FaDA).

=== Decolonialism ===
According to Jason Hickel, economic growth in the Global North is colonial in character, and "green growth" visions likewise presuppose the continuation of colonial arrangements. Hickel argues that economic expansion in the North relies on the appropriation of atmospheric common goods as well as resources and labor from the Global South. He describes capitalism, which is organized around perpetual economic growth, as sustaining this dynamic by extracting surplus through processes of enclosure, commodification, and the cheapening of labour and nature. According to Hickel, degrowth critiques these mechanisms and instead proposes to organize economies around provisioning for human needs, through de-accumulation, de-enclosure and de-commodification, while recognizing ecological debt. He further maintains that catch-up development for the South is impossible without decolonization.

=== Degrowth in the Global South ===
The discussion around degrowth in the Global South highlights the importance of moving beyond a one-size-fits-all model of socio-ecological transformation. Rather than applying degrowth uniformly, scholars emphasize the need for context-specific approaches that account for historical inequalities, global economic dependencies, and diverse local realities. Emerging frameworks call for greater inclusion of Southern perspectives, attention to structural imbalances in global trade and finance, and the recognition of alternative visions of prosperity rooted in indigenous knowledge and post-development thought. In this sense, degrowth is increasingly framed not as a prescriptive agenda, but as an open, evolving dialogue shaped by multiple pathways toward ecological balance and social justice.

== Policies ==
There is a wide range of policy proposals associated with degrowth. In 2022, Nick Fitzpatrick, Timothée Parrique and Inês Cosme conducted a comprehensive survey of degrowth literature from 2005 to 2020 and found 530 specific policy proposals with "50 goals, 100 objectives, 380 instruments". The survey found that the ten most frequently cited proposals were: universal basic incomes, work-time reductions, job guarantees with a living wage, maximum income caps, declining caps on resource use and emissions, not-for-profit cooperatives, holding deliberative forums, reclaiming the commons, establishing ecovillages, and housing cooperatives.

In 2024, Leo Schlichter proposed democratic economic planning as a potential means of coordinating a degrowth economy, arguing that artificial intelligence and big data could facilitate economic planning while allowing production and resource allocation to be guided by societal needs.

To address the common criticism that such policies are not realistically financeable, economic anthropologist Jason Hickel sees an opportunity to learn from modern monetary theory, which argues that monetary sovereign states can issue the money needed to pay for anything available in the national economy without the need to first tax their citizens for the requisite funds. Taxation, credit regulations and price controls could be used to mitigate the inflation this may generate, while also reducing consumption.

According to effective altruist and journalist Kelsey Piper, degrowth as a policy agenda faces the disadvantage of being "too radical and not radical enough." The degrowth program offers many broad-brush policy prescriptions, but according to Piper the details never really add up. Piper points to the proposals presented by leading spokesperson Jason Hickel in his book Less Is More, describing them as "surprisingly sparse" in outlining how his vision could achieve its stated goals. She describes Hickel's proposals to shorten the workweek and reform tax policy as solid ideas, but considers the other suggested measures — such as ending planned obsolescence, advertising, food waste, and student debt — "laughably inadequate" to the scale of the climate challenge.

== Popularity ==
Drews and Van den Bergh surveyed scientists' views on economic growth versus the environment. The respondents were academics publishing on the relationship between economic growth and environmental sustainability, drawn from an interdisciplinary group of economists, environmental social scientists, and environmental natural scientists, selected based on their publications in leading peer-reviewed journals. Less than 1% favoured pursuing economic growth regardless of its environmental impacts ("growth at all costs"), 42% supported the view that growth can be made compatible with environmental sustainability ("green growth"), 31% preferred to ignore economic growth as a policy objective ("agrowth"), and 17% favoured halting economic growth altogether ("degrowth"). Another survey of nearly 800 climate policy researchers around the world found that 28% support degrowth.

In a representative survey of Spanish citizens, Drews and van den Bergh (2016) found that a majority regarded economic growth and environmental sustainability as compatible (green growth), about one-third preferred either disregarding economic growth as a policy goal (agrowth) or halting it altogether (degrowth).

Researcher Kristian Kongshøj, drawing on public opinion studies, argues that environmentalism is often associated with left-wing ideology, particularly when moving from general attitudes and values to views on specific policy measures with material and distributional implications. He suggests that strong environmental policies—especially when combined with social policies positioned firmly on the political left—may have difficulty attracting support beyond a predominantly left-leaning constituency. According to Kongshøj, perceptions of degrowth as a form of ecosocialism could therefore pose a challenge for its broader public acceptance.

Keyßer and Lenzen (2021) state that, compared with technology-driven pathways, a degrowth transition faces substantial political barriers. They cautioned, however, that not examining degrowth scenarios could contribute to a self-fulfilling prophecy, as deeming such scenarios infeasible from the outset would keep them marginalised in public discourse.

=== Support for individual policies ===
Other studies have examined public support for individual policies associated with degrowth, which do not necessarily indicate support for the broader degrowth agenda.

A 2025 discrete choice experiment involving 1,012 participants in the United States found significant support for some versions of each of four degrowth-related policies, particularly caps on fossil fuel production and universal healthcare. Respondents generally preferred caps over bans on new fossil fuel extraction and restrictions on advertising in public spaces over broader bans. Framing the policies around degrowth objectives did not significantly affect support for most proposals.

Khan et al. (2022) surveyed public opinion in Sweden on five policies associated with ecosocial and degrowth-oriented agendas: reduced working hours, a wealth tax, a maximum income, a basic income, and a meat tax. Reduced working hours received the highest level of support (about 50%), followed by a wealth tax (40%) and a meat tax (30%), while a maximum income and a basic income were supported by only 25% and 15% of respondents, respectively. In Europe, support for basic income varied from large minorities to clear majorities in favour, with higher support in countries where existing safety nets are less encompassing. The authors reported that political left–right orientation was a stronger predictor of support for such degrowth related policies than pro-environmental attitudes.

== Origins of the movement ==
=== Influence of Georgescu-Roegen ===
The degrowth movement recognises Romanian American mathematician, statistician and economist Nicholas Georgescu-Roegen as the main intellectual figure inspiring the movement. Georgescu-Roegen's intellectual inspiration to degrowth dates back to the 1970s. When Georgescu-Roegen delivered a lecture at the University of Geneva in 1974, he made a lasting impression on the young, newly graduated French historian and philosopher, Jacques Grinevald, who had earlier been introduced to Georgescu-Roegen's works by an academic advisor. Georgescu-Roegen and Grinevald became friends, and Grinevald devoted his research to a closer study of Georgescu-Roegen's work. As a result, in 1979, Grinevald published a French translation of a selection of Georgescu-Roegen's articles entitled Demain la décroissance: Entropie – Écologie – Économie ('Tomorrow, the Decline: Entropy – Ecology – Economy'). Georgescu-Roegen, who spoke French fluently, approved the use of the term décroissance in the title of the French translation. The book gained influence in French intellectual and academic circles from the outset. Later, the book was expanded and republished in 1995 and once again in 2006; however, the word Demain ('tomorrow') was removed from the book's title in the second and third editions.

By the time Grinevald suggested the term décroissance to form part of the title of the French translation of Georgescu-Roegen's work, the term had already permeated French intellectual circles since the early 1970s to signify a deliberate political action to downscale the economy on a permanent and voluntary basis. Grinevald also realised the congruence of Georgescu-Roegen's viewpoint and the French debates occurring at the time; this resemblance was captured in the title of the French edition. The translation of Georgescu-Roegen's work into French both fed on and gave further impetus to the concept of décroissance in France—and everywhere else in the francophone world—thereby creating something of an intellectual feedback loop.

By the 2000s, when décroissance was to be translated from French back into English as the catchy banner for the new social movement, the original term "decline" was deemed inappropriate and misdirected for the purpose: "Decline" usually refers to an unexpected, unwelcome, and temporary economic recession, something to be avoided or quickly overcome. Instead, the neologism "degrowth" was coined to signify a deliberate political action to downscale the economy on a permanent, conscious basis—as in the prevailing French usage of the term—something good to be welcomed and maintained, or so followers believe.

When the first international degrowth conference was held in Paris in 2008, the participants honoured Georgescu-Roegen and his work. In his manifesto on Petit traité de la décroissance sereine ("Farewell to Growth"), the leading French champion of the degrowth movement, Serge Latouche, credited Georgescu-Roegen as the "main theoretical source of degrowth". Likewise, Italian degrowth theorist Mauro Bonaiuti considered Georgescu-Roegen's work to be "one of the analytical cornerstones of the degrowth perspective".

=== Recent developments ===
In 2019, a summary for policymakers of the largest, most comprehensive study to date of biodiversity and ecosystem services was published by the Intergovernmental Science-Policy Platform on Biodiversity and Ecosystem Services. The report mentioned that a variety of alternative economic frameworks — including inclusive wealth accounting, natural capital accounting and degrowth models — are increasingly being considered as possible ways to reconcile economic growth with the conservation of nature.

In a June 2020 paper published in Nature Communications, the authors state that a change in economic paradigms is imperative to prevent environmental destruction, and suggest a range of ideas from the reformist (agrowth) to the radical (degrowth, eco-socialism and eco-anarchism).

In a 2022 comment published in Nature, Hickel, Giorgos Kallis, Juliet Schor, Julia Steinberger and others say that both the IPCC and the IPBES "suggest that degrowth policies should be considered in the fight against climate breakdown and biodiversity loss, respectively".

== Relation to other social movements ==
The degrowth movement has a variety of relations to other social movements and alternative economic visions, which range from collaboration to partial overlap. The Konzeptwerk Neue Ökonomie (Laboratory for New Economic Ideas), which hosted the 2014 international Degrowth conference in Leipzig, has published a project entitled "Degrowth in movement(s)" in 2017, which maps relationships with 32 other social movements and initiatives.

Although not explicitly called degrowth, movements inspired by similar concepts and terminologies can be found around the world, including Buen Vivir in Latin America and Eco-Swaraj in India.

Another set of movements the degrowth movement finds synergy with is the wave of initiatives and networks inspired by the commons, where resources are sustainably shared in a decentralised and self-managed manner, instead of through capitalist organization. For example, initiatives inspired by commons could be food cooperatives, open-source platforms, and group management of resources such as energy or water. Commons-based peer production also guides the role of technology in degrowth, where conviviality and socially useful production are prioritised over capital gain. This could happen in the form of cosmolocalism, which offers a framework for localising collaborative forms of production while sharing resources globally as digital commons, to reduce dependence on global value chains.

== Scholarly reviews ==
Several systematic reviews and critical assessments of degrowth literature have been published since 2017.

The first inventory of degrowth policy proposals was conducted by Cosme et al. (2017), who reviewed 128 academic articles in English published between 2007 and 2014. The authors concluded about three-quarters of the proposals were top-down public policies with a national focus. The study found that proposals tended to prioritise social equity over ecological sustainability, with even less emphasis on efficient allocation, and gave limited attention to topics such as implications for the Global South, demographic issues, and the role of the state in sustainability transitions.

A 2017 review reviewed 91 articles between 2006 and 2015. Until 2012, articles largely constitute conceptual essays endorsed by normative claims. After 2012, they found a gradual shift from activist-driven narratives and conceptual essays to more formal economics, material and energy flow accounting, and empirical case studies. However in general the empirical assessments in the economic domain are scarce; attempts to quantify the increasing costs and disutility of continued economic growth are largely absent from the degrowth discourse. Only 17 out of 91 articles separate introduction, methods, results, and discussion as it is typically done in the natural sciences. One third of the reviewed articles contain normative claims that are inaccessible to rigid scientific testing, often adhering to a vision that wants to reclaim democracy and re-politicize economic relations. Also engineering and technological innovation have been dealt with only anecdotally in the degrowth discourse. They conclude the academic degrowth discourse could benefit from rigid hypotheses testing through input-output modelling, material flow analysis, life-cycle assessments, or social surveys.

A 2022 systematic review concluded most degrowth proposals lack precision, depth, and overlook interactions between policies. They also note that policy dropping is commonplace, with policies mentioned only in passing and without much analytical effort to connect them to the issues at hand.

A 2024 systematic review of 561 degrowth studies over the past 10 years showed that most were of poor quality: almost 90% were opinions rather than analysis, few used quantitative or qualitative data, and even fewer ones used formal modelling. The data-based studies often relied on small or non-representative samples, and therefore tended not to satisfy accepted standards for good research. Also most studies offered subjective policy advice, but lacked policy evaluation and integration with insights from the literature on environmental/climate policies. Of the few studies on public support, a majority concluded that degrowth strategies and policies are socially and politically infeasible. Few adopted a system-wide perspective, instead focusing on small, local cases without clear implications for the economy as a whole. The study also notes there is no clear increase in the share of studies employing modelling or data analysis; the percentage fluctuates over the years between 0% and 15%.

A 2024 systematic review of 951 peer-reviewed articles (2008–2022) found strong evidence of a widespread lack of concrete policy proposals in degrowth research, with about two-thirds of the literature containing no concrete distributional or monetary policy proposals. They conclude, that there appear to be few efforts in degrowth literature to develop and test concrete economic policies. They also concluded there is a low degree of collaboration among authors. The authors criticise that much degrowth research uncritically assumes that a monetary system with interest-bearing debt and private banks inevitably leads to continuous economic growth. This assumption is contested, and uncritically adopting it can, according to them, result in a misjudgment of the current economic reality, thereby hindering the development of feasible and effective transition strategies towards a degrowth economy.

A 2025 comparative review of degrowth and post-growth modeling studies published in Ecological Economics analyzed 75 peer-reviewed articles published between 2000 and 2023. The review found that "the reviewed studies represent a broad quantitative knowledge base demonstrating that, at least in the Global North, further growth is not necessary to achieve well-being while a reduction of the socio-economic metabolism would considerably facilitate the pursuit of ambitious climate goals." However, the authors noted that many models rely on a narrow set of policy proposals (like working time reduction, maximum income caps, carbon taxes, or a universal basic income) and call for more inclusive, geographically diverse approaches.

== Critiques ==
=== Criticisms ===
According to environmental economist Jeroen C. J. M. van den Bergh, degrowth is often seen as an ambiguous concept due to its various interpretations, which can lead to confusion rather than a clear and constructive debate on environmental policy. Many interpretations of degrowth do not offer effective strategies for reducing environmental impact or transitioning to a sustainable economy, whereas price incentives through environmental taxes or tradable permits are much more effective. Additionally, critics argue, degrowth is unlikely to gain significant social or political support, making it an ineffective strategy for achieving environmental sustainability.

The theoretical foundations of degrowth studies are considered fragile. Two scientists reviewed 561 peer-reviewed studies on the subject and concluded that 90% of them had serious methodological flaws.

==== Ineffectiveness and better alternatives ====
Jeroen C. J. M. van den Bergh argues in the scientific journal Ecological Economics that a focus solely on reducing consumption (or consumption degrowth) may lead to rebound effects. For instance, reducing consumption of certain goods and services might result in an increase in spending on other items, as disposable income remains unchanged. Alternatively, it could lead to savings, which would provide additional funds for others to borrow and spend. He emphasizes the importance of (global) environmental policies, such as pricing externalities through environmental taxes or tradable permits, which incentivize behavior changes that reduce environmental impact and which provide essential information for consumers and help manage rebound effects. Van den Bergh argues for an agnostic attitude toward economic growth, called agrowth. According to him, environmental policy should not be aimed at pursuing or avoiding growth in the hope of reducing environmental damage, but at direct deployment of effective instruments such as pricing externalities (for example, via carbon taxes or emission rights). Whether the economy grows, stagnates or shrinks as a result is of secondary importance.

A study published in Scientific Reports modelled two degrowth scenarios: one where the Global North undergoes negative growth and societal transformation, and another where degrowth is adopted globally. The former shows that such changes in the Global North are possible without severely harming long-term global socioeconomic development, though they only lead to a modest 10.5% reduction in future carbon emissions by 2100, and thus don't solve the climate crisis. In contrast, a global negative growth scenario could significantly cut future carbon emissions by 45%. However, it would also drastically hinder global development goals, particularly the elimination of poverty. Even with strong global policies aimed at supporting the poor (like increased cash transfers, improved income equality, and no military spending), this global degrowth approach is projected to increase global extreme poverty by 15 percentage points by 2100. The study also notes an absolute decoupling of long-term economic growth from human development outcomes has historically never been observed.

David Schwartzman argues in the academic journal Capitalism Nature Socialism that the degrowth program falls short in analyzing the qualitative aspects of economic growth and places too much emphasis on local economies without giving sufficient attention to global, transnational political strategies. Critics also point out that the debate on economic growth should distinguish between harmful and beneficial forms of growth. For example, growth in polluting products is problematic, whereas growth in knowledge, culture, or sustainable technologies can be desirable.

Economist Wim Naudé notes that Western economies are already in a state resembling degrowth, which he characterizes as a Great Stagnation. This period is marked by declining levels of entrepreneurship, innovation, scientific output, and research productivity. In a context of prolonged economic stagnation, the economy increasingly resembles a zero-sum system. In such a scenario, improvements in the well-being of one group or country may come at the expense of another, leading to conflict. Naudé refers to the analysis by Thomas Piketty (2014), arguing that low growth leads to very substantial inequality in the distribution of wealth over the long run. According to Naudé economic stagnation makes societies less innovative and less resilient, which hinders the timely development of the technological and organizational innovations needed to prevent ecological overshoot and tackle climate change.

Economist Branko Milanović argues that degrowth is unrealistic in a world still marked by poverty and inequality. He estimates that freezing global GDP at its current level would leave around 15% of the world population below $1.90 per day and one quarter below $2.50. Raising all incomes to the global average (about $5,500 per year) would require a two-thirds reduction in Western consumption and production. According to Milanović, this would mean factories, trains, airports and schools operating at only one-third of their normal capacity, electricity, heating and hot water available for just eight hours a day and cars allowed on the road only one day out of three. He concludes that such scenarios are politically and socially infeasible, and instead advocates taxing emission-intensive goods and services alongside technological innovation.

Major critics point out that degrowth is politically unpalatable, defaulting towards the more free market green growth orthodoxy as a set of solutions that is more politically tenable. Per Espen Stoknes, director of the Center for Green Growth at the BI Norwegian Business School, stated: "The degrowth people are living a fantasy where they assume that if you bake a smaller cake, then for some reason, the poorest will get a bigger share of it. That has never happened in history." Ezra Klein of the New York Times claims problems with the current SDG process are political rather than technical and degrowth has less plausibility than green growth as a democratic political platform.

==== Negative connotation ====
The use of the term "degrowth" is criticized for being detrimental to the degrowth movement because it could carry a negative connotation, in opposition to the positively perceived "growth". "Growth" is associated with the "up" direction and positive experiences, while "down" generates the opposite associations. Research in political psychology has shown that the initial negative association of a concept, such as of "degrowth" with the negatively perceived "down", can bias how the subsequent information on that concept is integrated at the unconscious level. At the conscious level, degrowth can be interpreted negatively as the contraction of the economy, although this is not the goal of a degrowth transition, but rather one of its expected consequences.

Since "degrowth" contains the term "growth", there is also a risk of the term having a backfire effect, which would reinforce the initial positive attitude toward growth. "Degrowth" is also criticized for being a confusing term, since its aim is not to halt economic growth as the word implies. Instead, "a-growth" is proposed as an alternative concept that emphasizes that growth ceases to be an important policy objective, but that it can still be achieved as a side-effect of environmental and social policies.

==== Eurocentrism ====
According to a review by Weiss and Cattaneo, while degrowth scholars operate globally, the academic discourse is predominantly centered in Europe, with a notable concentration of research originating from Spain. This geographic imbalance has led some researchers to argue that the movement predominantly represents the socio-economic interests and values of the European "green" middle class.

==== Systems theoretical critique ====
In stressing the negative rather than the positive side(s) of growth, the majority of degrowth proponents remain focused on (de-)growth, thus giving continued attention to the issue of growth, leading to continued attention to the arguments that sustainable growth is possible. One way to avoid giving attention to growth might be extending from the economic concept of growth, which proponents of both growth and degrowth commonly adopt, to a broader concept of growth that allows for the observation of growth in other sociological characteristics of society. A corresponding "recoding" of "growth-obsessed", capitalist organizations was proposed by Steffen Roth.

==== Marxist critique ====
Traditional Marxists consider that it is the exploitative nature and control of the capitalist production relations that is the determinant and not the quantity. According to Jean Zin, while the justification for degrowth is valid, it is not a solution to the problem. Other Marxist writers have adopted positions close to the de-growth perspective. For example, John Bellamy Foster and Fred Magdoff, in common with David Harvey, Immanuel Wallerstein, Paul Sweezy and others focus on endless capital accumulation as the basic principle and goal of capitalism. This is the source of economic growth and, in the view of these writers, results in an unsustainable growth imperative. Foster and Magdoff develop Marx's own concept of the metabolic rift, something he noted in the exhaustion of soils by capitalist systems of food production, though this is not unique to capitalist systems of food production as seen in the Aral Sea. Many degrowth theories and ideas are based on neo-Marxist theory. Foster emphasizes that degrowth "is not aimed at austerity, but at finding a 'prosperous way down' from our current extractivist, wasteful, ecologically unsustainable, maldeveloped, exploitative, and unequal, class-hierarchical world."

=== Challenges ===
==== Agriculture ====
When it comes to agriculture, a degrowth society would require a shift from industrial agriculture to less intensive and more sustainable agricultural practices such as permaculture or organic agriculture. Still, it is not clear if any of those alternatives could feed the current and projected global population. In the case of organic agriculture, Germany, for example, would not be able to feed its population under ideal organic yields over all of its arable land without meaningful changes to patterns of consumption, such as reducing meat consumption and food waste. Moreover, labour productivity of non-industrial agriculture is significantly lower due to the reduced use or absence of fossil fuels, which leaves much less labour for other sectors.

==== Healthcare ====
One analysis has said there is an apparent trade-off between the ability of modern healthcare systems to treat individual bodies to their last breath and the broader global ecological risk of such an energy and resource intensive care. If this trade-off exists, a degrowth society must choose between prioritizing the ecological integrity and the ensuing collective health or maximizing the healthcare provided to individuals.

==== Land privatisation ====
Baumann, Alexander and Burdon suggest that "the Degrowth movement needs to give more attention to land and housing costs, which are significant barriers hindering true political and economic agency and any grassroots driven degrowth transition."

=== Dilemmas ===
Given that modernity has emerged with high levels of energy and material throughput, there is an apparent compromise between desirable aspects of modernity (e.g., social justice, gender equality, long life expectancy, low infant mortality) and unsustainable levels of energy and material use.

Another way of looking at the argument that the development of desirable aspects of modernity require unsustainable energy and material use is through the lens of the Marxist tradition, which relates the superstructure (culture, ideology, institutions) and the base (material conditions of life, division of labor). A degrowth society, with its drastically different material conditions, could produce equally drastic changes in society's cultural and ideological spheres. The political economy of global capitalism has generated a lot of social and environmental bads, such as socioeconomic inequality and ecological devastation, which in turn have also generated a lot of goods through individualization and increased spatial and social mobility.

Some argue the political economy of capitalism has allowed social emancipation at the level of gender equality, disability, sexuality and anti-racism that has no historical precedent. However, Doyal and Gough allege that the modern capitalist system is built on the exploitation of female reproductive labor as well as that of the Global South, and sexism and racism are embedded in its structure. Therefore, some theories (such as Eco-Feminism or political ecology) argue that there cannot be equality regarding gender and the hierarchy between the Global North and South within capitalism.

The structural properties of growth present another barrier to degrowth as growth shapes and is enforced by institutions, norms, culture, technology, identities, etc. The social ingraining of growth manifests in peoples' aspirations, thinking, bodies, mindsets, and relationships. Together, growth's role in social practices and in socio-economic institutions present unique challenges to the success of the degrowth movement. Another potential barrier to degrowth is the need for a rapid transition to a degrowth society due to climate change and the potential negative impacts of a rapid social transition including disorientation, conflict, and decreased well-being.

Co-evolving aspects of global capitalism, liberal modernity, and the market society, are closely tied and will be difficult to separate to maintain liberal and cosmopolitan values in a degrowth society. At the same time, the goal of the degrowth movement is progression rather than regression, and degrowth proponents have said that neoclassical economic models indicate neither negative nor zero growth would harm economic stability or full employment. Several assert the main barriers to the movement are social and structural factors clashing with implementing degrowth measures.

== See also ==
- A Blueprint for Survival
- Agrowth
- Anti-consumerism
- Capital in the Anthropocene
- Criticism of capitalism
- Critique of political economy
- Degrowth advocates (category)
- Doughnut (economic model)
- Political ecology
- Postdevelopment theory
- Power Down: Options and Actions for a Post-Carbon World
- Paradox of thrift
- The Path to Degrowth in Overdeveloped Countries
- Post-capitalism
- Post-growth
- Productivism
- Prosperity Without Growth
- Slow movement
- Steady-state economy
- Transition town
- Uneconomic growth
