= Emission intensity =

Emission rate of a pollutant

The carbon intensity of electricity measures the amount of greenhouse gases emitted per unit of electricity produced. The units are in grams of CO₂equivalents per kilowatt-hour of electricity.

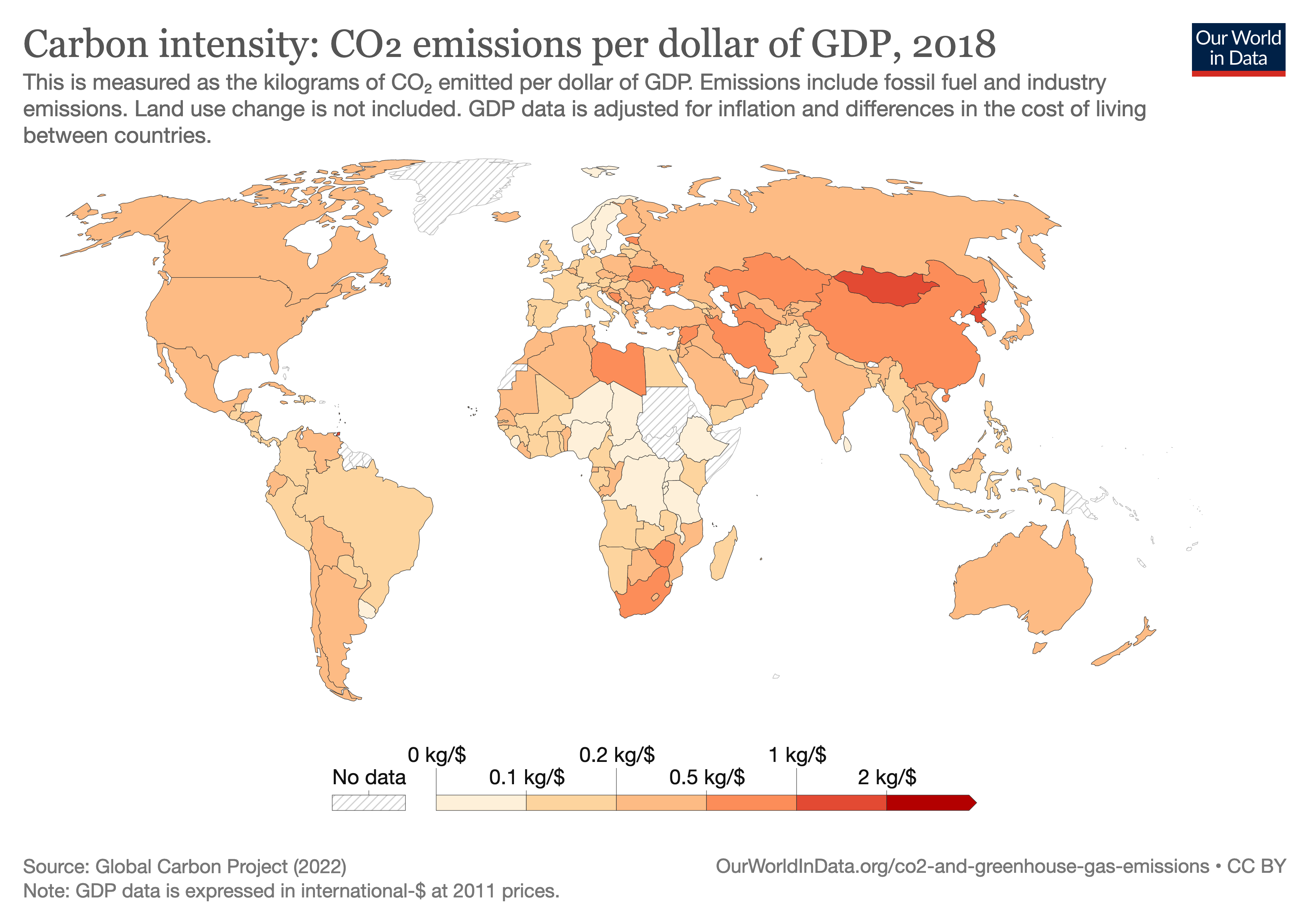
Carbon emission intensity of economies in kg of CO₂ per unit of GDP (2016)

An emission intensity (also carbon intensity or C.I.) is the emission rate of a given pollutant relative to the intensity of a specific activity, or an industrial production process; for example grams of carbon dioxide released per megajoule of energy produced, or the ratio of greenhouse gas emissions produced to gross domestic product (GDP). Emission intensities are used to derive estimates of air pollutant or greenhouse gas emissions based on the amount of fuel combusted, the number of animals in animal husbandry, on industrial production levels, distances traveled or similar activity data. Emission intensities may also be used to compare the environmental impact of different fuels or activities. In some case the related terms emission factor and carbon intensity are used interchangeably. The jargon used can be different, for different fields/industrial sectors; normally the term "carbon" excludes other pollutants, such as particulate emissions. One commonly used figure is carbon intensity per kilowatt-hour (CIPK), which is used to compare emissions from different sources of electrical power.

== Methodologies ==
Different methodologies can be used to assess the carbon intensity of a process. Among the most used methodologies there are:

- The whole life-cycle assessment (LCA): this includes not only the carbon emissions due to a specific process, but also those due to the production and end-of-life of materials, plants and machineries used for the considered process. This is a quite complex method, requiring a big set of variables.
- The well-to-wheels (WTW), commonly used in the Energy and Transport sectors: this is a simplified LCA considering the emissions of the process itself, the emissions due to the extraction and refining of the material (or fuel) used in the process (also "Upstream emissions"), but excluding the emissions due to the production and end-of-life of plants and machineries. This methodology is used, in the US, by the GREET model and in Europe in the JEC WTW.
- WTW-LCA hybrid methods, trying to fill in the gap between the WTW and LCA methods. In example, for an Electric Vehicle, an hybrid method considering also the GHG due to the manufacturing and the end of life of the battery gives GHG emissions 10–13% higher, compared to the WTW
- Methods not considering LCA aspects but only the emissions occurring during a specific process; i.e. just the combustion of a fuel in a power plant, without considering the Upstream emissions.

Different calculation methods can lead to different results. The results can largely vary also for different geographic regions and timeframes (see, in example, how C.I. of electricity varies, for different European countries, and how varied in a few years: from 2009 to 2013 the C.I. of electricity in the European Union fell on average by 20%, So while comparing different values of Carbon Intensity it is important to correctly consider all the boundary conditions (or initial hypotheses) considered for the calculations. For example, Chinese oil fields emit between 1.5 and more than 40 g of CO_{2e} per MJ with about 90% of all fields emitting 1.5–13.5 g CO_{2e}. Such highly skewed carbon intensity patterns necessitate disaggregation of seemingly homogeneous emission activities and proper consideration of many factors for understanding.

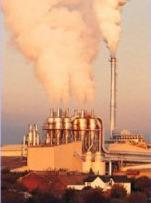
An air pollution emission source

== Estimating emissions ==
Emission factors assume a linear relation between the intensity of the activity and the emission resulting from this activity:

Emission_{pollutant} = Activity * Emission Factor_{pollutant}

Intensities are also used in projecting possible future scenarios such as those used in the IPCC assessments, along with projected future changes in population, economic activity and energy technologies. The interrelations of these variables is treated under the so-called Kaya identity.

The level of uncertainty of the resulting estimates depends significantly on the source category and the pollutant. Some examples:

- Carbon dioxide (CO_{2}) emissions from the combustion of fuel can be estimated with a high degree of certainty regardless of how the fuel is used as these emissions depend almost exclusively on the carbon content of the fuel, which is generally known with a high degree of precision. The same is true for sulphur dioxide (SO_{2}), since sulphur contents of fuels are also generally well known. Both carbon and sulphur are almost completely oxidized during combustion and all carbon and sulphur atoms in the fuel will be present in the flue gases as CO_{2} and SO_{2} respectively.
- In contrast, the levels of other air pollutants and non-CO_{2} greenhouse gas emissions from combustion depend on the precise technology applied when fuel is combusted. These emissions are basically caused by either incomplete combustion of a small fraction of the fuel (carbon monoxide, methane, non-methane volatile organic compounds) or by complicated chemical and physical processes during the combustion and in the smoke stack or tailpipe. Examples of these are particulates, NO_{x}, a mixture of nitric oxide, NO, and nitrogen dioxide, NO_{2}).
- Nitrous oxide (N_{2}O) emissions from agricultural soils are highly uncertain because they depend very much on both the exact conditions of the soil, the application of fertilizers and meteorological conditions.

== Electric generation ==
A literature review of numerous total life cycle energy sources CO_{2} emissions per unit of electricity generated, conducted by the Intergovernmental Panel on Climate Change in 2011, found that the CO_{2} emission value, that fell within the 50th percentile of all total life cycle emissions studies were as follows.

Lifecycle greenhouse gas emissions by electricity source
Technology	Description	50th percentile (g CO_{2}-eq/kWh_{e})
Hydroelectric	reservoir	4
Wind	onshore	12
Nuclear	various generation II reactor types	16
Biomass	various	230
Solar thermal	parabolic trough	22
Geothermal	hot dry rock	45
Solar PV	Polycrystalline silicon	46
Natural gas	various combined cycle turbines without scrubbing	469
Coal	various generator types without scrubbing	1001

Emission factors of common fuels
Fuel/ Resource	Thermal g(CO_{2e})/MJ_{th}	Energy Intensity (min & max estimate) W·h_{th}/W·h_{e}	Electric (min & max estimate) g(CO_{2})/kW·h_{e}
wood	115		
Peat	106; 110		
Coal	B:91.50–91.72; Br:94.33; 88	B:2.62–2.85; Br:3.46; 3.01	B:863–941; Br:1,175; 955
Oil	73	3.40	893
Natural gas	cc:68.20 oc:68.40 51	cc:2.35 (2.20 – 2.57) oc:3.05 (2.81 – 3.46)	cc:577 (491–655) oc:751 (627–891); 599
Geothermal; Power	3~		T_{L}0–1; T_{H}91–122
Uranium; Nuclear power		W_{L}0.18 (0.16~0.40); W_{H}0.20 (0.18~0.35)	W_{L}60 (10~130); W_{H}65 (10~120)
Hydroelectricity		0.046 (0.020 – 0.137)	15 (6.5 – 44)
Conc. Solar Pwr			40±15#
Photovoltaics		0.33 (0.16 – 0.67)	106 (53–217)
Wind power		0.066 (0.041 – 0.12)	21 (13–40)

Note: 3.6 MJ = megajoule(s) == 1 kW·h = kilowatt-hour(s), thus 1 g/MJ = 3.6 g/kW·h.

Legend: B = Black coal (supercritical)–(new subcritical), Br = Brown coal (new subcritical), cc = combined cycle, oc = open cycle, T_{L} = low-temperature/closed-circuit (geothermal doublet), T_{H} = high-temperature/open-circuit, W_{L} = Light Water Reactors, W_{H} = Heavy Water Reactors, #Educated estimate.

== Carbon intensity of regions ==
Greenhouse gas intensity in the year 2000, including land-use change.

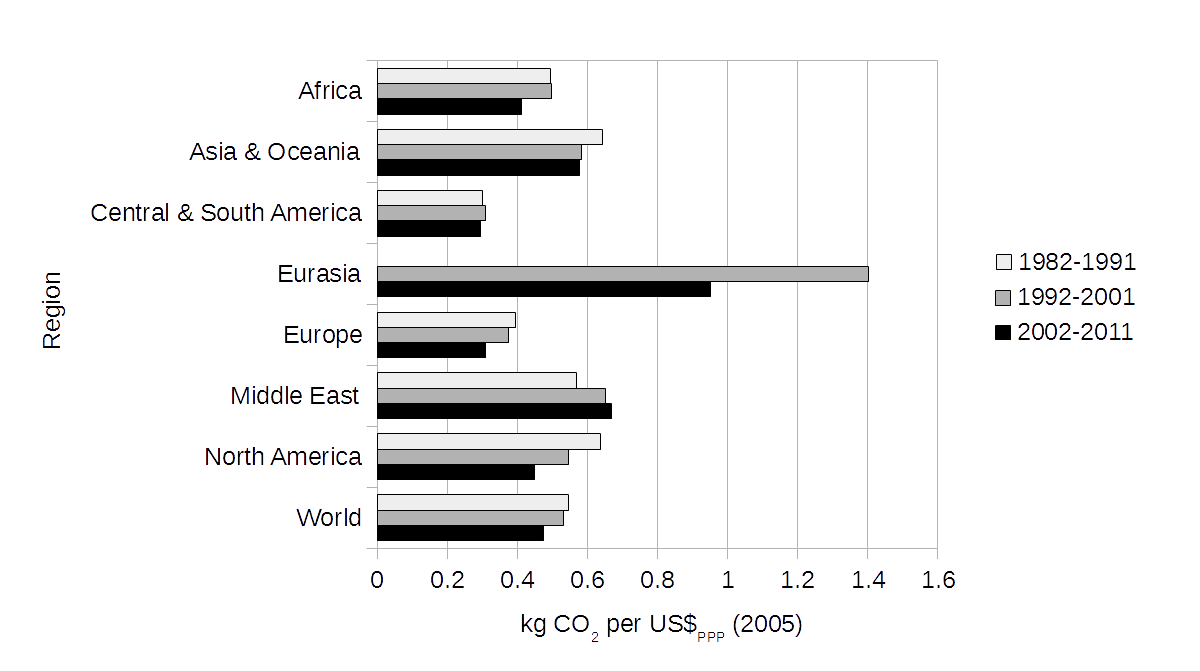
Carbon intensity of GDP (using PPP) for different regions, 1982–2011.

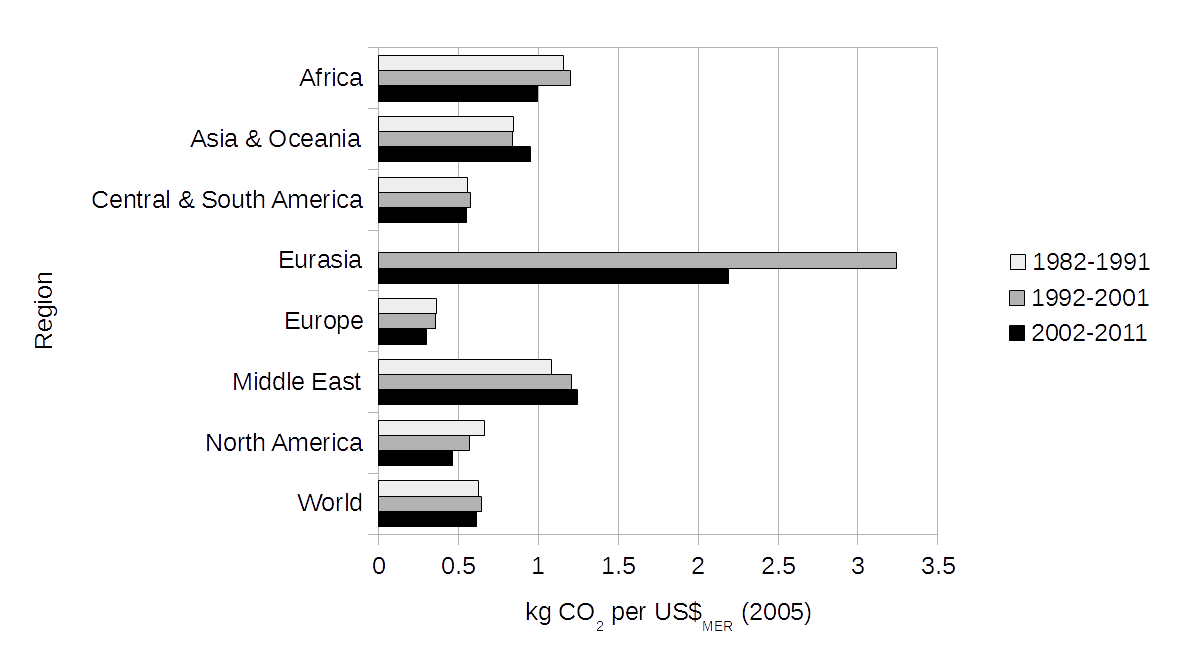
Carbon intensity of GDP (using MER) for different regions, 1982–2011.

The following tables show carbon intensity of GDP in market exchange rates (MER) and purchasing power parities (PPP). Units are metric tons of carbon dioxide per thousand year 2005 US dollars. Data are taken from the US Energy Information Administration. Annual data between 1980 and 2009 are averaged over three decades: 1980–89, 1990–99, and 2000–09.

Carbon intensity of GDP, measured in MER
	1980–89	1990–99	2000–09
Africa	1.13149	1.20702	1.03995
Asia & Oceania	0.86256	0.83015	0.91721
Central & South America	0.55840	0.57278	0.56015
Eurasia	NA	3.31786	2.36849
Europe	0.36840	0.37245	0.30975
Middle East	0.98779	1.21475	1.22310
North America	0.69381	0.58681	0.48160
World	0.62170	0.66120	0.60725

Carbon intensity of GDP, measured in PPP
	1980–89	1990–99	2000–09
Africa	0.48844	0.50215	0.43067
Asia & Oceania	0.66187	0.59249	0.57356
Central & South America	0.30095	0.30740	0.30185
Eurasia	NA	1.43161	1.02797
Europe	0.40413	0.38897	0.32077
Middle East	0.51641	0.65690	0.65723
North America	0.66743	0.56634	0.46509
World	0.54495	0.54868	0.48058

In 2009 CO_{2} intensity of GDP in the OECD countries reduced by 2.9% and amounted to 0.33 kCO_{2}/$05p in the OECD countries. ("$05p" = 2005 US dollars, using purchasing power parities). The USA posted a higher ratio of 0.41 kCO_{2}/$05p while Europe showed the largest drop in CO_{2} intensity compared to the previous year (−3.7%). CO_{2} intensity continued to be roughly higher in non-OECD countries. Despite a slight improvement, China continued to post a high CO_{2} intensity (0.81 kCO_{2}/$05p). CO_{2} intensity in Asia rose by 2% during 2009 since energy consumption continued to develop at a strong pace. Important ratios were also observed in countries in CIS and the Middle East.

=== Carbon intensity in Europe ===
Total CO_{2} emissions from energy use were 5% below their 1990 level in 2007. Over the period 1990–2007, CO_{2} emissions from energy use have decreased on average by 0.3%/year although the economic activity (GDP) increased by 2.3%/year. After dropping until 1994 (−1.6%/year), the CO_{2} emissions have increased steadily (0.4%/year on average) until 2003 and decreased slowly again since (on average by 0.6%/year). Total CO_{2} emissions per capita decreased from 8.7 t in 1990 to 7.8 t in 2007, that is to say a decrease by 10%. Almost 40% of the reduction in CO_{2} intensity is due to increased use of energy carriers with lower emission factors. Total CO_{2} emissions per unit of GDP, the “CO_{2} intensity”, decreased more rapidly than energy intensity: by 2.3%/year and 1.4%/year, respectively, on average between 1990 and 2007.

However, while the reports from 2007 suggest that the CO_{2} emissions are going down recent studies find that the global emissions are rapidly escalating. According to the Climate Change 2022 Mitigation of Climate Change report, conducted by the IPCC, it states that it 2019 the world emissions output was 59 gigatonnes. This shows that global emissions has grown rapidly, increasing by about 2.1% each year compared from the previous decade.

The Commodity Exchange Bratislava (CEB) has calculated carbon intensity for Voluntary Emissions Reduction projects carbon intensity in 2012 to be 0.343 tn/MWh.

A 2024 report shows an increase of renewable energy production, reaching 50% of the energy mix

According to data from the European Commission, in order to achieve the EU goal of decreasing greenhouse gas emissions by at least 55% by 2030 compared to 1990, EU-based energy investment has to double from the previous decade to more than €400 billion annually this decade. This includes the roughly €300 billion in yearly investment required for energy efficiency and the roughly €120 billion required for power networks and renewable energy facilities.

== Emission factors for greenhouse gas inventory reporting ==
One of the most important uses of emission factors is for the reporting of national greenhouse gas inventories under the United Nations Framework Convention on Climate Change (UNFCCC). The so-called Annex I Parties to the UNFCCC have to annually report their national total emissions of greenhouse gases in a formalized reporting format, defining the source categories and fuels that must be included.

The UNFCCC has accepted the Revised 1996 IPCC Guidelines for National Greenhouse Gas Inventories, developed and published by the Intergovernmental Panel on Climate Change (IPCC) as the emission estimation methods that must be used by the parties to the convention to ensure transparency, completeness, consistency, comparability and accuracy of the national greenhouse gas inventories. These IPCC Guidelines are the primary source for default emission factors. Recently IPCC has published the 2006 IPCC Guidelines for National Greenhouse Gas Inventories. These and many more greenhouse gas emission factors can be found on IPCC's Emission Factor Database. Commercially applicable organisational greenhouse gas emission factors can be found on the search engine, EmissionFactors.com.

Particularly for non-CO_{2e} emissions, there is often a high degree of uncertainty associated with these emission factors when applied to individual countries. In general, the use of country-specific emission factors would provide more accurate estimates of emissions than the use of the default emission factors. According to the IPCC, if an activity is a major source of emissions for a country ('key source'), it is 'good practice' to develop a country-specific emission factor for that activity.

== Emission factors for air pollutant inventory reporting ==
The United Nations Economic Commission for Europe and the EU National Emission Ceilings Directive (2016) require countries to produce annual National Air Pollution Emission Inventories under the provisions of the Convention on Long-Range Transboundary Air Pollution (CLRTAP).

The European Monitoring and Evaluation Programme (EMEP) Task Force of the European Environment Agency has developed methods to estimate emissions and the associated emission factors for air pollutants, which have been published in the EMEP/CORINAIR Emission Inventory Guidebook on Emission Inventories and Projections TFEIP.

== Intensity targets ==
Coal, being mostly carbon, emits a lot of CO_{2} when burnt: it has a high CO_{2} emission intensity. Natural gas, being methane (CH_{4}), has 4 hydrogen atoms to burn for each one of carbon and thus has medium CO_{2} emission intensity.

== Sources of emission factors ==
=== Greenhouse gases ===
- 2006 IPCC Guidelines for National Greenhouse Gas Inventories
- Revised 1996 IPCC Guidelines for National Greenhouse Gas Inventories (reference manual).
- IPCC Emission Factor Database
- National Inventory Report: Greenhouse Gas Sources and Sinks in Canada.
- United Kingdom's emission factor database.

=== Air pollutants ===
- AP 42, Compilation of Air Pollutant Emission Factors US Environmental Protection Agency
- EMEP/CORIMAIR 2007 Emission Inventory Guidebook.
- Fugitive emissions leaks from ethylene and other chemical plants.

== Well-to-refinery carbon intensity (CI) of all major active oil fields globally ==
In an August 31, 2018 article by Masnadi et al. which was published by Science, the authors used "open-source oil-sector CI modeling tools" to "model well-to-refinery carbon intensity (CI) of all major active oil fields globally—and to identify major drivers of these emissions." They compared 90 countries with the highest crude oil footprint. The Science study, which was conducted by Stanford University found that Canadian crude oil is the "fourth-most greenhouse gas (GHG) intensive in the world" behind Algeria, Venezuela and Cameroon.

Because oil deposits differ in carbon intensity, and because a substantial share of known oil reserves must remain unextracted to keep global warming below 2 °C or to limit overshooting of the 1.5 °C target, the question of which oil deposits should be phased out is of significant importance. A 2026 study by Renaud Coulomb, Fanny Henriet et Léo Reitzmann published in the Review of Economic Studies quantifies the additional emissions and economic costs associated with the historical extraction of high–carbon-intensity oil deposits. The study shows that accounting for heterogeneity in the carbon intensity of oil deposits could have reduced cumulative emissions by about 11 GtCO₂-equivalent between 1992 and 2018, without changing global oil demand, by avoiding the extraction of higher-carbon intensity deposits. These results imply the existence of a substantial supply-side ecological debt for major producers of high-carbon-intensity oil (e.g., Algeria, Canada, Venezuela). Looking forward, the study estimates that avoiding these high-carbon intensity deposits could avoid approximately 9.3 gigatonnes of CO₂-equivalent emissions, valued at US$1.9 trillion, along a future demand pathway consistent with achieving net-zero emissions by 2050.

== See also ==
- Air pollution
- AP 42 Compilation of Air Pollutant Emission Factors
- Carbon footprint
- Emission inventory
- Energy intensity
- Greenhouse gas and Greenhouse effect
- IPCC list of greenhouse gases
- Kaya identity
- Life-cycle greenhouse gas emissions of energy sources
- List of countries by carbon intensity of GDP
- Low-carbon economy
- Low-carbon fuel standard
- Mobile emission reduction credit
- Radiative forcing
- Resource intensity
- Spheroidal carbonaceous particles
- Vehicle emission standard
