= SDC =

SDC may refer to:

- SAARC Documentation Centre, New Delhi, India
- San Diego County, the second most populous county in the U.S. state of California
- Sassarese language, ISO 639-3 code
- Sentosa Development Corporation, a statutory board in Singapore
- Sheffield Development Corporation, England
- Shoreditch High Street railway station, London, National Rail station code
- Societas Doctrinæ Christianæ
- Stage Directors and Choreographers Society, US
- Sussex Downs College, England
- Sustainable Development Commission, UK
- Swiss Agency for Development and Cooperation
- Syrian Democratic Council, the legislature of Rojava
- Show Dem Camp, Nigerian rap duo
- Samsung Developer Conference

== Computing and technology ==
- Secure Download Cabinet, an encrypted computer file format
- Self-driving car
- Semi-drop center (SDC) rim, see Single-piece wheel manufacturing
- IEEE 11073 service-oriented device connectivity
- Smart Data Compression, a GIS data format
- Society of Dyers and Colourists
- Spirit DataCine, a motion picture film scanner
- Statistical disclosure control
- Structured Data on Commons, a project on Wikimedia Commons
- Stupid D Compiler for the D programming language
- Sydney Development Corporation, a former Canadian software company
- System Development Corporation, a computer software company
