= Anti-consumerism =

Sociopolitical ideology

Anti-consumerism is a sociopolitical ideology. It has been described as "intentionally and meaningfully excluding or cutting goods from one's consumption routine or reusing once-acquired goods with the goal of avoiding consumption". The ideology is opposed to consumerism, being a social and economic order in which the aspirations of many individuals include the acquisition of goods and services beyond those necessary for survival or traditional displays of status.

Anti-consumerism is concerned with the actions of individuals, as well as businesses where they act in pursuit of financial and economic goals at the expense of the perceived public good. Commonly, anti-consumerism is connected with concern for environmental protection, anti-globalization, and animal-rights. Post-consumerism, the prioritization of well-being over material prosperity, is a related ideology.

== Background ==
Anti-consumerism originated from criticism of consumption, arguably starting with Thorstein Veblen, who, in the book The Theory of the Leisure Class: An Economic Study of Institutions (1899), suggested that consumerism dates from the cradle of civilization. The term consumerism also denotes economic policies associated with Keynesian economics, and the belief that the free choice of consumers should dictate the economic structure of a society (cf. producerism). Modern political anti-consumerism developed in the 2000s.

Anti-consumerism can be seen as an extension of postmodern society, supporting a "decentralized culture", rejecting a hegemonic cultural imperialism of globalisation and consumption, and responding to negative impacts of consumption on the environment. Further, it has been observed that: "While almost all contemporary critics [of consumerism] and activists talk of the need for an environmentally sustainable mode of living, many also focus intently on how the consumerism driving overconsumption undermines our sense of well being and happiness; contributes to a culture of overwork, haste and instantaneous gratification; underscores a bland cultural homogenization of life; and fragments communities and social relationships."

Predictors of anti-consumerist attitudes and behaviors at an individual level include concerns about environmental pollution or disruption of ecological balance, a desire to live a simple life, and a belief that a search for happiness should come from internal factors.

== Development and expression ==
=== Significant works ===
An important contribution to the critique of consumerism has been made by French philosopher Bernard Stiegler, arguing modern capitalism is governed by consumption rather than production, and the advertising techniques used to create consumer behaviour amount to the destruction of psychic and collective individuation. The diversion of libidinal energy toward the consumption of consumer products, he argues, results in an addictive cycle of consumption, leading to hyper-consumption, the exhaustion of desire, and the reign of symbolic misery.

Examples of anti-consumerist works include the book No Logo (2000) by Naomi Klein, and documentary films such as The Corporation (2003), by Mark Achbar and Jennifer Abbott, and Surplus: Terrorized into Being Consumers (2003), by Erik Gandini.

=== Religion ===
Anti-consumerist beliefs are in some cases connected with religious beliefs. A religious criticism asserts that materialist consumerism interferes with the connection between the individual and God, and so is an inherently immoral style of life; thus the German historian Oswald Spengler (1880–1936) said that, "Life in America is exclusively economic in structure, and lacks depth." From the Roman Catholic perspective, Thomas Aquinas said that, "Greed is a sin against God, just as all mortal sins, in as much as man condemns things eternal for the sake of temporal things"; in that vein, Francis of Assisi, Ammon Hennacy, and Mohandas Gandhi said that spiritual inspiration guided them towards simple living.

Islamic prophet Muhammad frequently endorsed simple living and anti-consumerism.

=== Protest ===
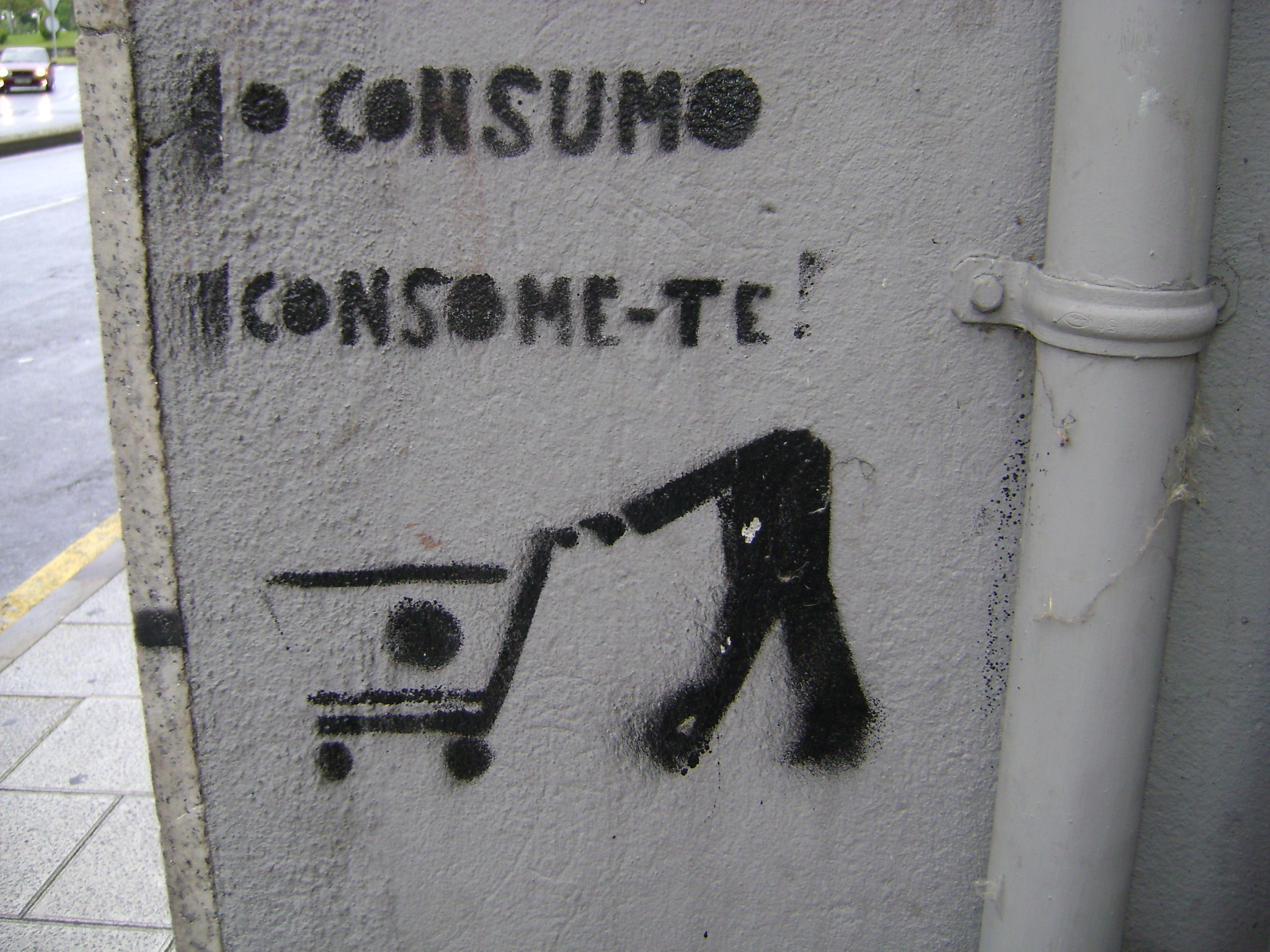
A Portuguese anti-consumerist stencil graffiti saying "Consuming consumes you"

Anti-consumerist messages are often raised in protests, including in the broader context of environmentalism and anti-corporate activism. A notable anti-consumerist protest community is Reverend Billy and the Church of Stop Shopping.

In the context of protest art, Banksy, an influential British graffitist, painter, activist and filmmaker, has created satirical and provocative works about the consumerist society. Examples include "Napalm", an attack on Walt Disney Pictures and McDonald's, and "Show Me the Monet", among many others. In his 2004 book Cut It Out, Banksy writes, "You owe the companies nothing. Less than nothing, you especially don't owe them any courtesy. They owe you. They have re-arranged the world to put themselves in front of you. They never asked for your permission, don't even start asking for theirs."

=== Individual and community responses ===
Practicing anti-consumerism can mean voluntarily simplifying and minimizing one's lifestyle; this can be in efforts to exist more sustainably in a consumer culture. These lifestyle changes, which include choosing paper bags over plastic bags when shopping, are also in line with anti-corporate activism and green consumerism—both large contributors to the ethical market. Degrowth, commoning and other movements aim to collectively address sustainability issues through practices and approaches that radically reduce consumption and replace consumer culture with new ethics and values.

=== Modern Development ===
The modern development of anti-consumerism is closely tied to the global environmental crisis, particularly the urgency surrounding climate change. As the world faces environmental degradation and the depletion of natural resources, anti-consumerist movements have gained momentum. These movements advocate for reducing overconsumption, promoting conscious consumption, and addressing waste, especially the growing plastic problem.

A key argument for these movements is the need for both personal and systemic changes. Many activists, such as George Monbiot, emphasize that overconsumption is a root cause of global crises like climate change, biodiversity loss, and environmental degradation. Efforts like upcycling and reducing plastic waste are part of broader campaigns aimed at creating sustainable consumption patterns. Moreover, critics of unchecked consumerism argue that solving these issues requires more than individual action; it also necessitates economic restructuring to lessen dependence on constant consumer spending. One crucial aspect of this movement is the call for "voluntary simplicity," which advocates for reducing material needs to reduce environmental impact. This is reflected in policies from international bodies like the United Nations, which has highlighted the importance of sustainable consumption in its development goals. It also is reflected in online communities; with their influence on consumers through sharing their own experience in adopting this lifestyle of “voluntary simplicity” they provide advice about practicing sustainable consumption in their daily routine and provide also relationships that keeps them accountable in maintaining it. By embracing a mindset of reducing consumption, both individuals and institutions can significantly lower emissions and resource use, addressing environmental challenges more effectively than through green technologies alone.

== Advertising ==
Anti-consumerists believe advertising plays a huge role in human life by informing values and assumptions of the cultural system, deeming what is acceptable, and determining social standards. They declare that ads create a hyper-real world where commodities appear as the key to securing happiness. Anti-consumerists cite studies that find that individuals believe their quality of life improves in relation to social values that lie outside the capability of the marketplace. Therefore, advertising attempts to equate the social with the material by utilizing images and slogans to link commodities with the real sources of human happiness, such as meaningful relationships. Ads are then a detriment to society because they tell consumers that accumulating more and more possessions will bring them closer to self-actualization, or the concept of a complete and secure being. "The underlying message is that owning these products will enhance our image and ensure our popularity with others." And while advertising promises that a product will make the consumer happy, advertising simultaneously depends upon the consumer never being truly happy, as then the consumer would no longer feel the need to consume needless products.

Anti-consumerists claim that in a consumerist society, advertisement images disempower and objectify the consumer. By stressing individual power, choice and desire, advertising falsely implies the control lies with the consumer. Because anti-consumerists believe commodities supply only short-term gratification, they detract from a sustainably happy society. Further, advertisers have resorted to new techniques of capturing attention, such as the increased speed of ads and product placements. In this way, commercials infiltrate the consumerist society and become an inextricable part of the culture. In a review of research on materialistic values and goals, Tim Kasser (2016) argues that the pursuit of material possessions can lead to short-term gratification at the expense of long-term well-being. Anti-consumerists condemn advertising because it constructs a simulated world that offers fantastical escapism to consumers, rather than reflecting actual reality. They further argue that ads depict the interests and lifestyles of the elite as natural; cultivating a deep sense of inadequacy among viewers. They denounce the use of beautiful models because they glamorize the commodity beyond the reach of the average individual.

In an opinion segment of New Scientist magazine published in August 2009, reporter Andy Coghlan cited William Rees of the University of British Columbia and epidemiologist Warren Hern of the University of Colorado at Boulder, saying that human beings, despite considering themselves civilized thinkers, are "subconsciously still driven by an impulse for survival, domination and expansion... an impulse which now finds expression in the idea that inexorable economic growth is the answer to everything, and, given time, will redress all the world's existing inequalities." He argues that consumerism is making these tendencies worse by encouraging consumption without limit.

Supporters of anti-consumerism often accuse advertising of attention theft, i.e. they believe it unjustifiably invades public areas, thereby imposing itself on people who consider its presence unwanted. American graphic designer Sean Tejaratchi expresses his resentment of this "ad creep" in a 1999 issue of his clip art zine Crap Hound: "Advertising increasingly invades my environment instead of letting me come to it on my own terms when I need it... The most powerful and well-funded methods of mass communication in history have been used to create a one-way, unending flow of shit into my life... In the twenty-eight years since I was born, I've been subjected to a stunning amount of advertising, and I don't recall anyone ever asking me if I minded."

Resistance to the penetration of advertising into everyday life has also taken performative forms. In 2025, Kong Junyou, a student at Shanghai University, shut down more than 100 residential elevator advertising screens as part of a filmed protest against loud and unavoidable commercial messages in enclosed living spaces.

Anti-consumerism has paved the way for a "subvertising" (also known as culture jamming) movement, which uses artistic and political strategies to protest modern forms of publicity; acts of "subvertising" include "removing advertising from public spaces, tweeting to inform the city's mayor of illicit advertising practices, recuperating posters from bus stop advertising panels, producing critical advertising guides, documentaries or organising public workshops."

== In economic theory ==
=== Austrian economics ===
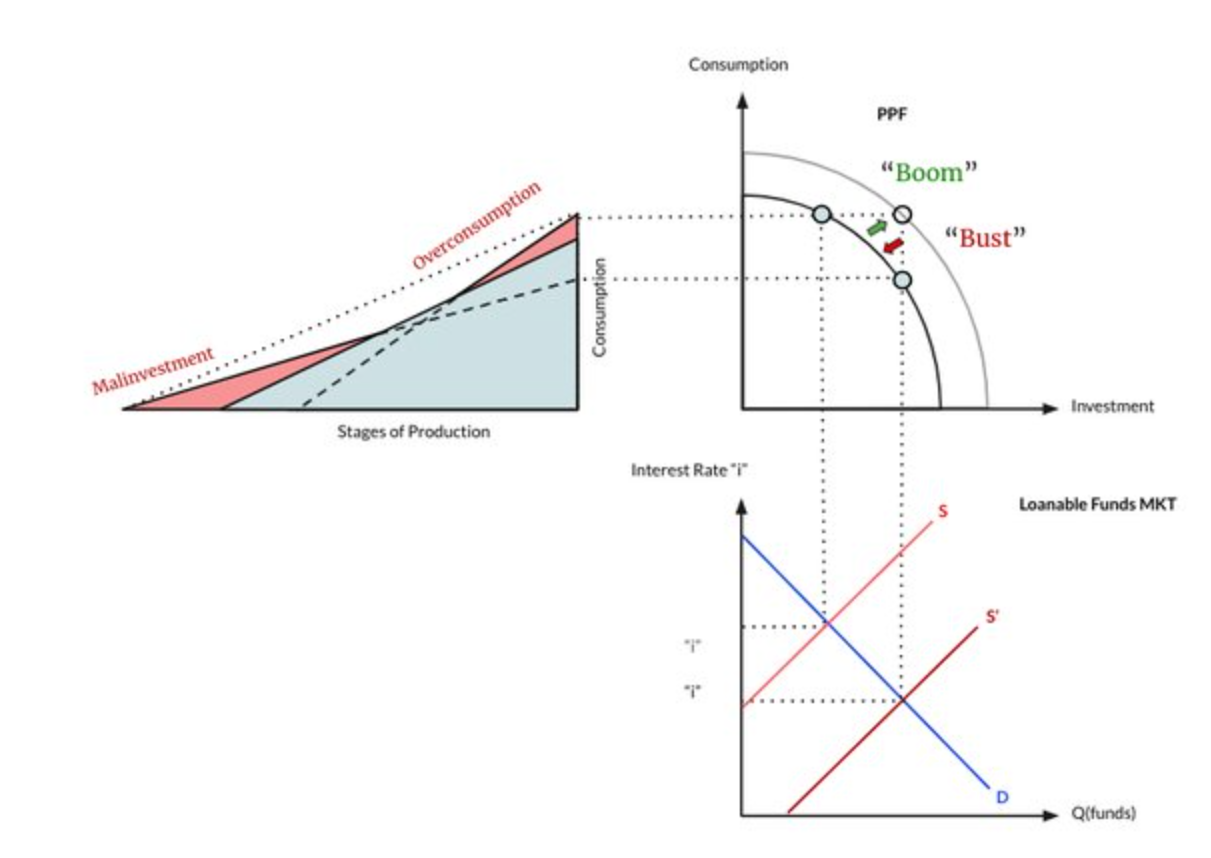
Austrian business cycle theory, formulated by Friedrich Hayek, before and during the Great Depression

As a classical defence pertinent in this context, Austrian economic advocates focus on the entrepreneur, promoting a productive lifestyle rather than a materialistic one wherein the individual is defined by things and not their self. Certain economists have further rendered Keynesian notions of propagating increased consumption - in order to mitigate recessive impacts when the populace refuse to spend - as obsolete, since numerous founding principles presume that minor adjustments are implemented via expansions and contractions, at least monetarily, are the reason behind business cycles, given the distinct outcome from resulting interest rate changes on distinguished points within the structure of production, a theory Woods would endorse.

Furthermore, this is emphasised by the trend that a nation is unable to obtain wealth via consumption, which inevitably translates to entire resource absorption; Production is therefore what grants consumption as a possibility to begin with, given that a producer would not be working towards revenue, if not one's consumptive desires in their own expenditure discretion. Moreover, the Austrian School dictates that the determinative estimate of goods and services motivate the demand for these commodities in order for their prices to be influenced by consumers.

Others have often hinted towards rivalry amongst consumers, in that all parties, producer and consumer alike, behave in an entrepreneurial manner; The latter's market process interpretation is assumed to have provided the entrepreneurial role only to the producer. This is further emphasised upon when the consumer's absence is highlighted, whereby the sparse knowledge available, likewise with the producer's ability to calculate in gathering information as opposed to the government doing so - a direct laissez-faire correlation - the consumer becomes indecisive, and thus astray. This was subject to heavy debate during the Interwar era, in what was known as the socialist-calculation debate. The status of the consumer has rarely been of any discussion in Austrian economics since. However, it has drawn attention to some limited degree in relation to production, with practitioners in the field having abused consumer rationality, as well as recognising their abstinence from market elucidation.

=== Neoclassical synthesis ===
Despite its revised instances of state interventionism, adherence to the consumer theory remained abundant via the supply and demand model of Keynesianism. Paul Samuelson stated that neoclassical synthesis should have been utilised towards the extent of fiscal and monetary interventions in order for economic stabilisation and maintaining full employment, albeit emphasising that the market economy cannot solely ensure full employment. The IS-LM-Philips unit of analysis model correlated the IS-LM model with the Phillips curve, which placed sums on quantities such as the marginal propensity to consume, invest, if not the volatility of money demand towards interest rates, in order for macroeconomic predictions to be forecast or the stimulations of economic policy consolidations. These are often in similar bearing with the main fundamentals of NNE, a revised edition of Neoclassical synthesis.

Developments within consumption theory of the movement were published in specialized journals. Most of the expenditures area was addressed by consumer choice adaptations within the markets field against Keynesianism. Incentives and prices were represented in playing a prevalent role that determined decision making, directly pointing against individual demand, discerning how prices as regards to costs and income affect demand quantity

Labour markets are often focused upon two features, opportunity cost of leisure as well as wage rate; When wage rate increases, it hints that labourers are willing to work more and it concludes with them entering the labour force. Irrespective of the presumed incentivisation, the contrary is entirely possible, whereby workers work less and consume further leisure. Because of these interrelations, it is reasonable to determine that wage rates and labour supply both relate positively, albeit negative for opportunity of leisure. Nevertheless, the theory argues for gradual wage increase over time within a competitive labour market. This is viewed by some as an early feature of new classical theory, since it has some relation to the real business-cycle theory in technological innovation, whereby implementing automation is often similar with becoming reliant over technology for economic output.

== Criticism ==
Critics of anti-consumerism have accused anti-consumerists of opposing modernity or utilitarianism, arguing that it can lead to elitism, primarily among libertarian viewpoints, who argue that every person should decide their level of consumption independent of outside influence. Right-wing critics see anti-consumerism as rooted in socialism. Consumerism tends to be associated with capitalism, so modern socialists tend to be anti-consumerist, with anti-consumerism described as having become "left wing common sense". In 1999, the libertarian magazine Reason attacked anti-consumerism, claiming Marxist academics were repackaging themselves as anti-consumerists. James B. Twitchell, a professor at the University of Florida and popular writer, referred to anti-consumerist arguments as "Marxism Lite".

There have also been socialist critics of anti-consumerism who see it as a form of anti-modern "reactionary socialism", and state that anti-consumerism has also been adopted by ultra-conservatives and fascists. Anti-consumerist stances, which strictly focus on criticising the forceful expansion of unnecessary needs in place of genuine desires under capitalism, have been criticised by Marxists as being ignorant of the historical and social nature of needs and a deviation from Marx's own point of view concerning consumerism. Rather than being incompatible with left-wing political ideologies, it has been argued that "it is not the working class that needs to be liberated from consumerism, or in other words their own material desires, but that consumerism should be liberated from capitalism".

In her book "Authenticity Guaranteed", Sally Robinson provides a feminist critique of anti-consumerist discourse. She articulates that the stances of anti-consumerists reflect a hierarchical gendered framework which concerns preservation of masculinity in its purest form from the feminine social mechanisms of consumerism that curtails masculine agency and authenticity. Citations of films such as Fight Club as an often anti-consumerist exemplary, according to her, presents consumerism as a crisis of masculinity in general. An anti-consumerist critique relies on the assumption that consumer culture is inauthentic and de-individualizing; therefore, it must also identify and delineate what constitutes the authentic and the individual.

In studies about whether anti-consumerism has been effective, it has been proven that for teenagers and young adults, the culture of media and their relationship often makes it difficult for them to reject consumerism. Science Daily has a report on this, and states that it is either because they have little independence to develop their own agenda, or because they are dependent on their own consumer activities (e.g. bars, clubs and shops) to retain some independent income.

In 2025, an economic study by Iwan Bos, Giovanni Maccarrone and Marco A. Marini models two ways of designing for a anti-consumerism campaign, painting it into two categories. On one hand, we have a "Stick" that denounce buyers, imposing psychological costs such as guilt and shame, on the other a "carrot" That gives non-buyers psychological rewards such as pride for abiding by anti-consumerism. Within the study, a model of two competing firms shows that both approaches weakly reduces the competitive pressure, output, prices and profits to a similar amount. However, the carrot produces higher consumer and social welfare than the stick.

== In popular media ==
In Fight Club, the protagonist finds himself participating in terroristic acts against corporate society and consumer culture. The film is regarded as one of the most widely recognizable pieces of anti-consumerist media. The success of the book and the film comes despite the author Chuck Palahniuk publicly stating that the story is both anticonsumerist and anticommercialist.

In the novel American Psycho by Bret Easton Ellis, the protagonist Patrick Bateman criticizes the consumerist society of America in the 1980s of which he is a personification. Later on he goes on a killing spree without any consequences, suggesting that the people around him are so self-absorbed and focused on consuming that they either do not see or do not care about his acts.

In the Pixar movie, WALL-E, Earth is depicted in an apocalyptic state caused by the negative effects of human consumerism.

== See also ==
- Anti-consumerists (category)
- Affluenza
- Anti-capitalism
- Brandalism
- Buy Nothing Day
- Collaborative consumption
- Critical consumerism
- Conceptual detours of the shopping cart in art, design and consumerism
- Degrowth
- Détournement
- Downshifting (lifestyle)
- Ethical consumerism
- Freeganism
- Growth Fetish
- Mottainai
- Neoism
- Over-consumption
- Philosophy of futility
- Planned obsolescence
- Post-growth
- Slow movement (culture)
- Steady-state economy
- Waste picker
- The Zeitgeist Movement
