= Material Concerns =

Economics book

- Author: Tim Jackson
- Original title: Material Concerns: Pollution, Profit and Quality of Life (report of the Stockholm Environment Institute)
- Language: English
- Subject: Sustainability Circular Economy Post-growth
- Genre: Non-fiction
- Published: 1996
- Publisher: Routledge (Stockholm Environment Institute)
- Publication place: United Kingdom
- ISBN: 978-1138935419

Material Concerns is a book by author and economist Tim Jackson. Published in 1996, it pioneered the concept of preventive environmental management, a core principle of the circular economy framework.

== Description ==
Twenty years before the Ellen MacArthur Foundation established its now widely recognised circular economy mission, Tim Jackson began developing what was called at the time preventive environmental management. The core idea was: prevention is better than cure, "preventing environmental damage at the outset is better than cleaning up after the fact".

Material Concerns - Pollution, Profit and Quality of Life was published in 1996 as a synthesis of his findings in Clean Production Strategies – Developing Preventive Environmental Management in the Industrial Economy, an edited collection drawing chapters from pre-eminent writers in the field, such as Walter R Stahel, Bill Rees, and Bob Costanza.

Rooted in the laws of thermodynamics and explicitly considering the ecological limits of the planet (chapter 8), the driving idea was to move industrial production away from an extractive linear system towards a reconceptualisation of the production cycle from design stage, prefiguring the concept of the circular economy.

The book outlines Tim Jackson's early views on the relationship between human wellbeing and economic growth (chapter 9 and 10), and thus resonates with his later work in the UK Sustainable Development Commission and around Prosperity Without Growth.

== Reception ==
Material Concerns was well received in the policy field. "Jackson has filled a near-unique niche in clean production publications with a text that combines great explicatory power with a driving visionary message", Andrew Tickle wrote in the Environmental Policy and Governance Journal. Jonathon Porritt endorsed Jackson's analysis with "incisive and persuasive. His prescriptions are both radical and viable — a rare and powerful combination." "Clear and compelling", wrote Michael Jacobs, a former advisor to UK Treasury and the UK Government, "Jackson provides both the conceptual framework and convincing illustration of the new environmental paradigm of industrial production. In ten years' time all managers will be thinking this way." Roland Clift called it "a very impressive and potentially influential book: imaginative yet rooted in sound common sense. Successfully drawing together the essential themes in the current environmental debate, this book deserves to be very widely read." John Benhart from the Journal of Cultural Geography found it to be: "inspirational … A major strength of the text is integration of the material economy with the ecosystem and thermodynamic system … [T]he author has written a pioneering book fusing environmental economic relationships in a new and needed approach for economic and industrial geography … I plan to use the textbook as a required book for my industrial geography course."

== See also ==
- Circular Economy
- Industrial Ecology
- Prosperity Without Growth
