= Prosperity =

Concept of economies regarding wealth, health, happiness, community and spirit

Prosperity is the state of flourishing, thriving, good fortune and successful social status. Prosperity often produces profuse wealth including other factors which can be profusely wealthy in all degrees, such as happiness and health.

== Competing notions of prosperity ==
Economic notions of prosperity often compete or interact negatively with health, happiness, or spiritual notions of prosperity. For example, longer hours of work might result in an increase in certain measures of economic prosperity, but at the expense of driving people away from their preferences for shorter work hours. In Buddhism, prosperity is viewed with an emphasis on collectivism and spirituality. This perspective can be at odds with capitalistic notions of prosperity, due to the latter's association with greed. Data from social surveys show that an increase in income does not result in a lasting increase in happiness; one proposed explanation to this is due to hedonic adaptation and social comparison, and a failure to anticipate these factors, resulting in people not allocating enough energy to non-financial goals such as family life and health.

The World Bank's "Voices of the Poor", based on research with over 20,000 poor people in 23 countries, identifies a range of factors which poor people identify as part of poverty. These include abuse by those in power, disempowering institutions, excluded locations, gender relationships, lack of security, limited capabilities, physical limitations, precarious livelihoods, problems in social relationships, weak community organizations and discrimination.

=== Debate under economic growth ===
Economic growth is often seen as essential for economic prosperity, and indeed is one of the factors that is used as a measure of prosperity. The Rocky Mountain Institute, among others, has put forth an alternative point of view, that prosperity does not require growth, claiming instead that many of the problems facing communities are actually a result of growth, and that sustainable development requires abandoning the idea that growth is required for prosperity. The debate over whether economic growth is necessary for, or at odds with, human prosperity, has been active at least since the publication of Our Common Future in 1987, and has been pointed to as reflecting two opposing worldviews.

In 1996, the British ecological economist Tim Jackson outlined the conflicting relationship between human wellbeing and economic growth in his book Material Concerns. Prosperity without Growth then, first published as a report to the UK Sustainable Development Commission in 2008, comprehensively expanded on the arguments and policy recommendations.

Internationally organised, the Degrowth movement is taking a similar position and argue that overconsumption lies at the root of long-term environmental issues and social inequalities, advocating for the down-scaling of production and consumption. In the 2021 Review on the Economics of Biodiversity commissioned by the UK Treasury, Partha Dasgupta argues prosperity has come at a "devastating" cost to biodiversity, and that sustainable economic growth will require abandoning GDP as a measure for economic progress.

Other researches and institutions argue that sustained economic growth remains essential for broad-based prosperity, particularly the reduction of extreme poverty and improvements in living standards. Empirical analyses indicate that changes in GDP per capita account for the large majority of historical variation in global poverty rates, and that growth has been a primary driver of the decline in extreme poverty over recent decades. World Bank assessments similarly emphasize that sustained growth generates jobs, supports public services and infrastructure, and is central to ending extreme poverty and boosting shared prosperity, even while acknowledging that the distribution of gains depends on complementary policies. Historical accounts, such as those by economist Angus Deaton, document how sustained rises in income and living standards over the past two centuries have been associated with dramatic improvements in health, longevity, and material well-being for large populations, constituting a "great escape" from deprivation.

== Synergistic notions of prosperity ==
Many distinct notions of prosperity, such as economic prosperity, health, and happiness, are correlated or even have causal effects on each other. Economic prosperity and health are well-established to have a positive correlation, but the extent to which health has a causal effect on economic prosperity is unclear.

There is evidence that happiness is a cause of good health, both directly through influencing behavior and the immune system, and indirectly through social relationships, work, and other factors. One study which advances a holistic definition of prosperity is the Legatum Prosperity Index (an annual report by the Legatum Institute, a UK-based independent educational charity founded by Legatum), which uses data from 56 separate sources, including the World Health Organization, Global slavery Index and World Bank, to rank 169 nations in an index which goes beyond GDP as a measurement of national prosperity.

=== Economic determinants and institutions ===
Research in economics identifies institutions, particularly secure property rights, constraints on elites, and the ability of individuals to engage in voluntary exchange, as fundamental determinants of long-run differences in prosperity across countries. Inclusive economic institutions that protect property rights for a broad cross-section of society and provide incentives for investment and innovation are associated with higher levels of income and growth, while extractive institutions that concentrate power and resources tend to produce poorer outcomes.

Cross-country studies and quantitative reviews of the literature find positive associations between measures of economic freedom (including property rights protection, freedom to trade, and limited regulatory barriers) and higher economic growth, income levels, and investment. Meta-analyses of published estimates generally support a positive relationship between economic freedom and growth and income.

Analyses using freedom and prosperity indicies similarly report strong correlations between higher economic freedom scores and higher prosperity outcomes, with some evidence consistent with a casual link from improvements in economic freedom to subsequent gains in GDP per capita.

== Ecological perspectives ==
In ecology, prosperity can refer to the extent to which a species flourishes under certain circumstances.

== See also ==
- Community cohesion
- Cultural capital
- Distribution of wealth
- Health
- Human rights
- International inequality
- Justice
- Material Concerns
- Mental health
- Natural conservation
- Peace
- Poverty
- Prosperity Without Growth
- Utopianism
