= The Path to Degrowth in Overdeveloped Countries =

"The Path to Degrowth in Overdeveloped Countries", written by Erik Assadourian, is the second chapter of the Worldwatch Institute's State of the World (2012), available for free online.

In his chapter of the report, Assadourian defines degrowth as an "essential and urgent" economic strategy to pursue in countries entrenched in overdevelopment (such as the United States) in order for those countries to be truly sustainable and adapt to "The rapidly warming Earth and the collapse of ecosystem services." Furthermore, he hopes to dispel "the myth that perpetual pursuit of growth is good for economies or the societies of which they are a part" for the well-being of the planet, of underdeveloped populations, and of the sick, stressed, and overweight populations of overdeveloped countries. Assadourian argues via the principle of plenitude that degrowth will inevitably occur whether we want it to or not because—on a planet of finite resources—economies and populations cannot grow infinitely, and overdeveloped countries are still pursuing more economic growth and overconsuming resources.

Assadourian outlines four policies overdeveloped nations could employ to sufficiently facilitate a planned and controlled contraction of the economy so as to get back in line with planetary boundaries. Each of these, in unison, will eventually foster the creation of a steady-state economy that is in balance with Earth's limits:

- Reduce overall consumption by overconsumers
- Distribute tax burdens more equitably
- Share work hours better
- Cultivate a plenitude economy: "informalize" certain sectors of the economy

Assadourian also wrote a two-page policy brief on the chapter highlighting the key messages of, the problem regarding, and points to keep in mind moving forward on our path to degrowth.

== See also ==
- Worldwatch Institute
- Prosperity Without Growth
- Degrowth
- Post growth
- Sustainable living
- Steady state economy
- Ecological economics
- Informal economy
