= Steady change =

Economic process

Steady change is the persistent process of transformation in a capitalist economic system.

This is explained by the continuous generation, diffusion, accumulation, and substitution of innovations by economic agents as time moves on. This regular (and accelerating) phenomenon causes movement and crises in economic structures as measured by rates of growth of countries, regions, sectors, and companies.

The economy is an evolving system. It is thus to always unfold and change, to incessantly show novel behaviour, to surprise its actors and observers with emergent phenomena. The concept stands in contrast to the conventional concept of "steady-state" in economics and is inspired by evolutionary insights in modern economic theory such as put forward by Nelson and Winter's book of 1982.
