= .sdc =

.sdc may refer to:

- Secure Download Cabinet files
- StarOffice calc files
