= Steady-state economy =

Constant capital and population size

A steady-state economy is an economy made up of a constant stock of physical wealth (capital) and a constant population size. In effect, such an economy does not grow in the course of time. The term usually refers to the national economy of a particular country, but it is also applicable to the economic system of a city, a region, or the entire world. Early in the history of economic thought, classical economist Adam Smith of the 18th century developed the concept of a stationary state of an economy: Smith believed that any national economy in the world would sooner or later settle in a final state of stationarity.

Since the 1970s, the concept of a steady-state economy has been associated mainly with the work of leading ecological economist Herman Daly. As Daly's concept of a steady-state includes the ecological analysis of natural resource flows through the economy, his concept differs from the original classical concept of a stationary state. One other difference is that Daly recommends immediate political action to establish the steady-state economy by imposing permanent government restrictions on all resource use, whereas economists of the classical period believed that the final stationary state of any economy would evolve by itself without any government intervention.

Critics of the steady-state economy usually object to it by arguing that resource decoupling, technological development, and the operation of market mechanisms are capable of overcoming resource scarcity, pollution, or population overshoot. On the other hand, proponents of the steady-state economy maintain that these objections remain insubstantial and mistaken, and that the need for a steady-state economy is becoming more compelling every day.

== Definition and vision ==
Since the 1970s, the concept of a steady-state economy has been associated mainly with the work of leading ecological economist Herman Daly — to such an extent that even his boldest critics recognize the prominence of his work.

Herman Daly defines his concept of a steady-state economy as an economic system made up of a constant stock of physical wealth (capital) and a constant stock of people (population), both stocks to be maintained by a flow of natural resources through the system. The first component, the constant stocks, is similar to the concept of the stationary state, originally used in classical economics; the second component, the flow of natural resources, is a new ecological feature, presently also used in the academic discipline of ecological economics. The durability of both of the constant stocks is to be maximized: The more durable the stock of capital is, the smaller the flow of natural resources is needed to maintain the stock; likewise, a 'durable' population means a population enjoying a high life expectancy — something desirable by itself — maintained by a low birth rate and an equally low death rate. Taken together, higher durability translates into better ecology in the system as a whole.

Daly's concept of a steady-state economy is based on the vision that man's economy is an open subsystem embedded in a finite natural environment of scarce resources and fragile ecosystems. The economy is maintained by importing valuable natural resources from the input end and exporting valueless waste and pollution at the output end in a constant and irreversible flow. Any subsystem of a finite nongrowing system must itself at some point also become nongrowing and start maintaining itself in a steady-state as far as possible. This vision is opposed to mainstream neoclassical economics, where the economy is represented by an isolated and circular model with goods and services exchanging endlessly between companies and households, without exhibiting any physical contact to the natural environment.

In the early 2010s, reviewers sympathetic towards Daly's concept of a steady-state economy have passed the concurrent judgement that although his concept remains beyond what is politically feasible at present, there is room for mainstream thinking and collective action to approach the concept in the future. In 2022 a research (chapters 4–5) described degrowth toward a steady state economy as something possible and probably positive. The study ends by the words:"The case for a transition to a steady-state economy with low throughput and low emissions, initially in the high-income economies and then in rapidly growing economies, needs more serious attention and international cooperation.

== Historical background ==
For centuries, economists and other scholars have considered matters of natural resource scarcity and limits to growth, from the early classical economists in the 18th and 19th centuries down to the ecological concerns that emerged in the second half of the 20th century and developed into the formation of ecological economics as an independent academic subdiscipline in economics.

=== Concept of the stationary state in classical economics ===
From Adam Smith and onwards, economists in the classical period of economic theorising described the general development of society in terms of a contrast between the scarcity of arable agricultural land on the one hand, and the growth of population and capital on the other hand. The incomes from gross production were distributed as rents, profits and wages among landowners, capitalists and labourers respectively, and these three classes were incessantly engaged in the struggle for increasing their own share. The accumulation of capital (net investments) would sooner or later come to an end as the rate of profit fell to a minimum or to nil. At that point, the economy would settle in a final stationary state with a constant population size and a constant stock of capital.

=== Adam Smith's concept ===
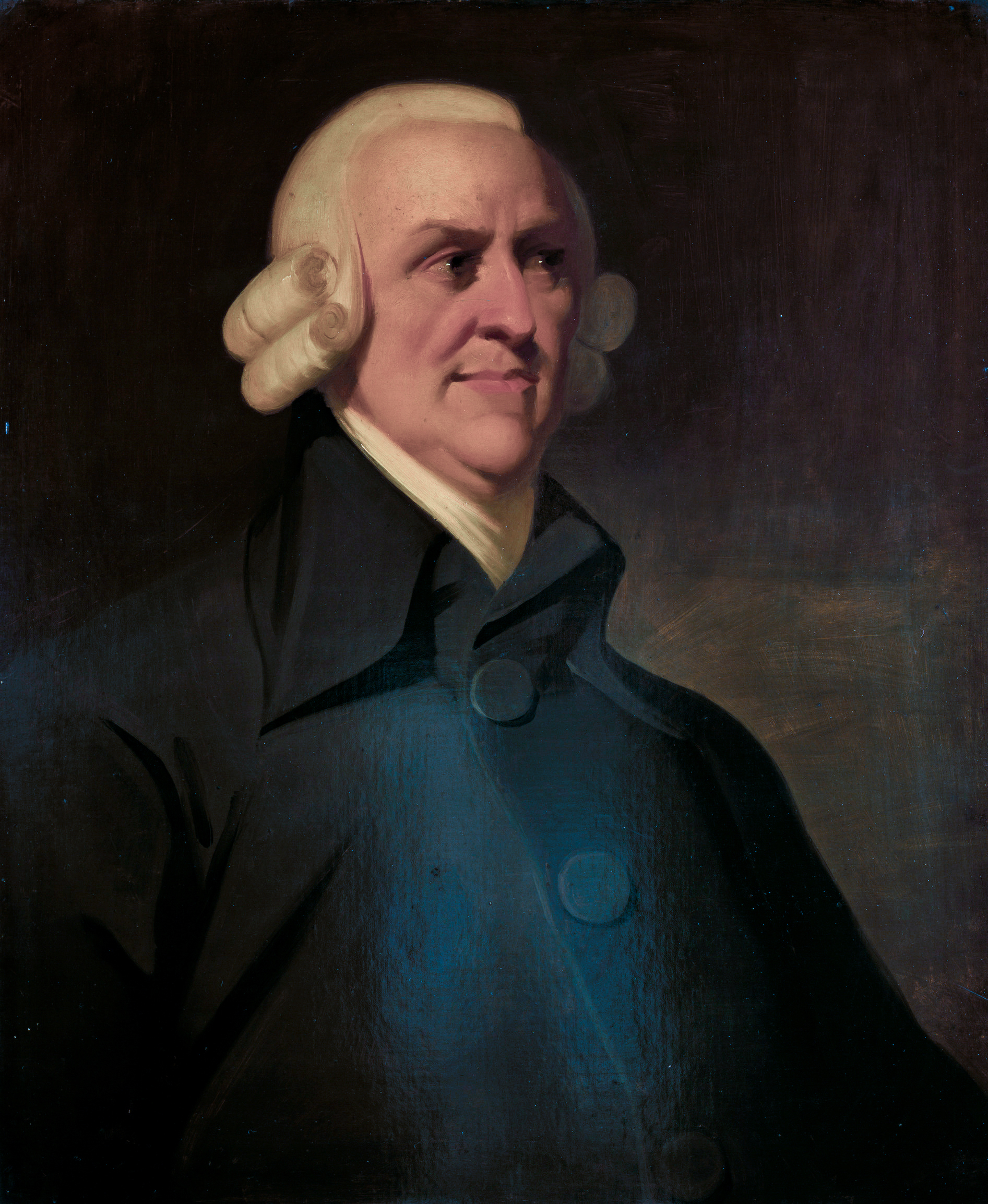
Smith examined the economic states of various nations in the world.

Adam Smith's magnum opus on The Wealth of Nations, published in 1776, laid the foundation of classical economics in Britain. Smith thereby disseminated and established a concept that has since been a cornerstone in economics throughout most of the world: In a liberal capitalist society, provided with a stable institutional and legal framework, an 'invisible hand' will ensure that the enlightened self-interest of all members of society will contribute to the growth and prosperity of society as a whole, thereby leading to an 'obvious and simple system of natural liberty'.

Smith was convinced of the beneficial effect of the enlightened self-interest on the wealth of nations; but he was less certain this wealth would grow forever. Smith observed that any country in the world found itself in either a 'progressive', a 'stationary', or a 'declining' state: Although England was wealthier than its North American colonies, wages were higher in the latter place as wealth in North America was growing faster than in England; hence, North America was in the 'cheerful and hearty' progressive state. In China, on the other hand, wages were low, the condition of poor people was scantier than in any nation in Europe, and more marriages were contracted here because the 'horrid' killing of newborn babies was permitted and even widely practised; hence, China was in the 'dull' stationary state, although it did not yet seem to be declining. In nations situated in the 'melancholic' declining state, the higher ranks of society would fall down and settle for occupation amid the lower ranks, while the lowest ranks would either subsist on a miserable and insufficient wage, resort to begging or crime, or slide into starvation and early death. Bengal and some other English settlements in the East Indies possibly found themselves in this state, Smith reckoned.

Smith pointed out that as wealth was growing in any nation, the rate of profit would tend to fall and investment opportunities would diminish. In a nation that had thereby reached this 'full complement of riches', society would finally settle in a stationary state with a constant stock of people and capital. In an 18th-century anticipation of The Limits to Growth (see below), Smith described the state as follows:

In a country which had acquired that full complement of riches which the nature of its soil and climate, and its situation with respect to other countries, allowed it to acquire; which could, therefore, advance no further, and which was not going backwards, both the wages of labour and the profits of stock would probably be very low. In a country fully peopled in proportion to what either its territory could maintain or its stock employ, the competition for employment would necessarily be so great as to reduce the wages of labour to what was barely sufficient to keep up the number of labourers, and, the country being already fully peopled, that number could never be augmented. In a country fully stocked in proportion to all the business it had to transact, as great a quantity of stock would be employed in every particular branch as the nature and extent of the trade would admit. The competition, therefore, would everywhere be as great, and consequently the ordinary profit as low as possible.

According to Smith, Holland seemed to be approaching this stationary state, although at a much higher level than in China. Smith believed the laws and institutions of China prevented this country from achieving the potential wealth its soil, climate and situation might have admitted of. Smith was unable to provide any contemporary examples of a nation in the world that had in fact reached the full complement of riches and thus had settled in stationarity, because, as he conjectured, "... perhaps no country has ever yet arrived at this degree of opulence."

=== David Ricardo's concept ===
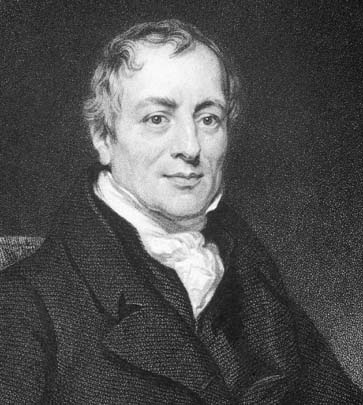
Ricardo was opposed to the interests of the landowning class.

In the early 19th century, David Ricardo was the leading economist of the day and the champion of British laissez-faire liberalism. He is known today for his free trade principle of comparative advantage, and for his formulation of the controversial labor theory of value. Ricardo replaced Adam Smith's empirical reasoning with abstract principles and deductive argument. This new methodology would later become the norm in economics as a science.

In Ricardo's times, Britain's trade with the European continent was somewhat disrupted during the Napoleonic Wars that had raged since 1803. The Continental System brought into effect a large-scale embargo against British trade, whereby the nation's food supply came to rely heavily on domestic agriculture to the benefit of the landowning classes. When the wars ended with Napoleon's final defeat in 1815, the landowning classes dominating the British parliament had managed to tighten the existing Corn Laws in order to retain their monopoly status on the home market during peacetime. The controversial Corn Laws were a protectionist two-sided measure of subsidies on corn exports and tariffs on corn imports. The tightening was opposed by both the capitalist and the labouring classes, as the high price of bread effectively reduced real profits and real wages in the economy. So was the political setting when Ricardo published his treatise On the Principles of Political Economy and Taxation in 1817.

According to Ricardo, the limits to growth were ever present due to scarcity of arable agricultural land in the country. In the wake of the wartime period, the British economy seemed to be approaching the stationary state as population was growing, plots of land with lower fertility were put into agricultural use, and the rising rents of the rural landowning class were crowding out the profits of the urban capitalists. This was the broad outline of Ricardo's controversial land rent theory. Ricardo believed that the only way for Britain to avoid the stationary state was to increase her volume of international trade: The country should export more industrial products and start importing cheap agricultural products from abroad in turn. However, this course of development was impeded by the Corn Laws that seemed to be hampering both the industrialisation and the internationalization of the British economy. In the 1820s, Ricardo and his followers – Ricardo himself died in 1823 – directed much of their fire at the Corn Laws in order to have them repealed, and various other free trade campaigners borrowed indiscriminately from Ricardo's doctrines to suit their agenda.

The Corn Laws were not repealed before 1846. In the meantime, the British economy kept growing, a fact that effectively undermined the credibility and thrust of Ricardian economics in Britain; but Ricardo had by now established himself as the first stationary state theorist in the history of economic thought.

Ricardo's preoccupation with class conflict anticipated the work of Karl Marx (see below).

=== John Stuart Mill's concept ===
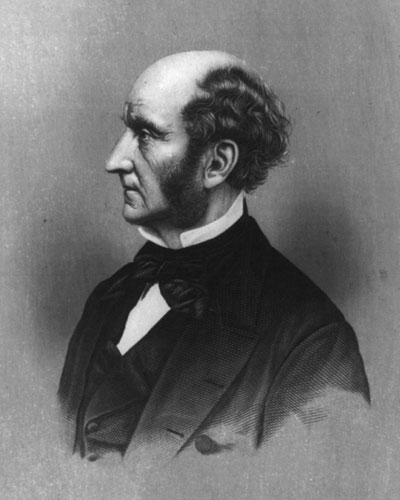
Mill believed the future stationary state was both inevitable, necessary and desirable.

John Stuart Mill was the leading economist, philosopher and social reformer in mid-19th century Britain. His economics treatise on the Principles of Political Economy, published in 1848, attained status as the standard textbook in economics throughout the English-speaking world until the turn of the century.

A champion of classical liberalism, Mill believed that an ideal society should allow all individuals to pursue their own good without any interference from others or from government. Also a utilitarian philosopher, Mill regarded the 'Greatest Happiness Principle' as the ultimate ideal for a harmonious society:

As the means of making the nearest approach to this ideal, utility would enjoin, first, that laws and social arrangements should place the happiness ... of every individual, as nearly as possible in harmony with the interest of the whole; and secondly, that education and opinion, which have so vast a power over human character, should so use that power as to establish in the mind of every individual an indissoluble association between his own happiness and the good of the whole; ...

Mill's concept of the stationary state was strongly coloured by these ideals. Mill conjectured that the stationary state of society was not too far away in the future:

It must always have been seen, more or less distinctly, by political economists, that the increase of wealth is not boundless; that at the end of what they term the progressive state lies the stationary state, that all progress in wealth is but a postponement of this, and that each step in advance is an approach to it. We have now been led to recognize that this ultimate goal is at all times near enough to be fully in view; that we are always on the verge of it, and that, if we have not reached it long ago, it is because the goal itself flies before us.

Contrary to both Smith and Ricardo before him, Mill took an optimistic view on the future stationary state. Mill could not "... regard the stationary state of capital and wealth with the unaffected aversion so generally manifested toward it by political economists of the old school." Instead, Mill attributed many important qualities to this future state, he even believed the state would bring about "... a very considerable improvement on our present condition." According to Mill, the stationary state was at one and the same time inevitable, necessary and desirable: It was inevitable, because the accumulation of capital would bring about a falling rate of profit that would diminish investment opportunities and hamper further accumulation; it was also necessary, because mankind had to learn how to reduce its size and its level of consumption within the boundaries set by nature and by employment opportunities; finally, the stationary state was desirable, as it would ease the introduction of public income redistibution schemes, create more equality and put an end to man's ruthless struggle to get by — instead, the human spirit would be liberated to the benefit of more elevated social and cultural activities, 'the graces of life'.

Hence, Mill was able to express all of his liberal ideals for mankind through his concept of the stationary state. It has been argued that Mill essentially made a quality-of-life argument for the stationary state.

=== Main developments in economics since Mill ===
When the influence of John Stuart Mill and his Principles declined, the classical-liberalist period of economic theorising came to an end. By the turn of the 19th century, Marxism and neoclassical economics had emerged to dominate economics:

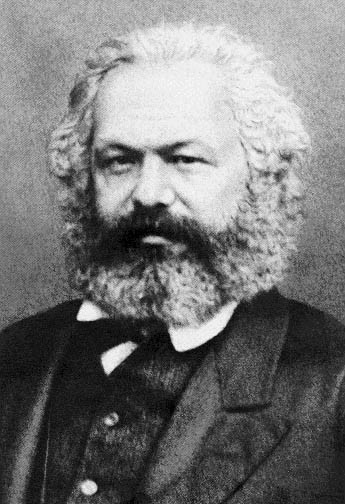
Marx replaced the concept of a stationary state with his vision of a communist society that would bring about abundance for everybody.

- Although a classical economist in his own right, Karl Marx abandoned the earlier concept of a stationary state and replaced it with his own unique vision of historical materialism, according to which human societies pass through several 'modes of production', eventually leading to communism. In each mode of production, man's increasing mastery over nature and the 'productive forces' of society develop to a point where the class conflict bursts into revolutions, followed by the establishment of a new mode of production. In opposition to his liberalist predecessors in the field, Marx did not regard natural resource scarcity as a factor constraining future economic growth; instead, the capitalist mode of production was to be overturned before the productive forces of society could fully develop, bringing about an abundance of goods in a new society based on the principle of "from each according to ability, to each according to need" — that is, communism. The assumption, based on technological optimism, was that communism would overcome any resource scarcity ever to be encountered. For ideological reasons, then, orthodox Marxism has mostly been opposed to any concern with natural resource scarcity ever since Marx's own day. However, the march of history has been hard on this ideology: By 1991, German sociologist Reiner Grundmann was able to make the rather sweeping observation that "Orthodox Marxism has vanished from the scene, leftism has turned green, and Marxists have become ecologists."
- In neoclassical economics, on the other hand, the preoccupation with society's long term growth and development inherent in classical economics was abandoned altogether; instead, economic analysis came to focus on the study of the relationship between given ends and given scarce means, forming the concept of general equilibrium theory within an essentially static framework. Hence, neoclassical economics achieved greater generality, but only by asking easier questions; and any concern with natural resource scarcity was neglected. For this reason, modern ecological economists have deplored the simplified and ecologically harmful features of neoclassical economics: It has been argued that neoclassical economics has become a pseudoscience of choice between anything in general and nothing in particular, while neglecting the preferences of future generations; that the very terminology of neoclassical economics is so ecologically illiterate as to rarely even refer to natural resources or ecological limits; and that neoclassical economics has developed to become a dominant free market ideology legitimizing an ideal of society resembling a perpetual motion machine of economic growth at intolerable environmental and human costs.

Taken together, it has been argued that "... if Judeo-Christian monotheism took nature out of religion, Anglo-American economists (after about 1880) took nature out of economics." Almost one century later, Herman Daly has reintegrated nature into economics in his concept of a steady-state economy (see below).

=== John Maynard Keynes's concept of reaching saturation ===
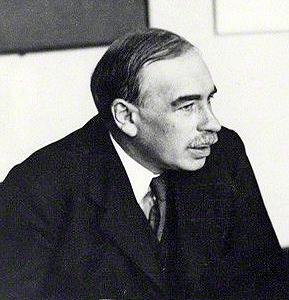
Keynes predicted that capital accumulation would soon reach saturation and bring about a quasi-stationary community.

John Maynard Keynes was the paradigm founder of modern macroeconomics, and is widely considered today to be the most influential economist of the 20th century. Keynes rejected the basic tenet of classical economics that free markets would lead to full employment by themselves. Consequently, he recommended government intervention to stimulate aggregate demand in the economy, a macroeconomic policy now known as Keynesian economics. Keynes also believed that capital accumulation would reach saturation at some point in the future.

In his essay from 1930 on The Economic Possibilities of Our Grandchildren, Keynes ventured to look one hundred years ahead into the future and predict the standard of living in the 21st century. Writing at the beginning of the Great Depression, Keynes rejected the prevailing "bad attack of economic pessimism" of his own time and foresaw that by 2030, the grandchildren of his generation would live in a state of abundance, where saturation would have been reached. People would find themselves liberated from such economic activities as saving and capital accumulation, and be able to get rid of 'pseudo-moral principles' — avarice, exaction of interest, love of money — that had characterized capitalistic societies so far. Instead, people would devote themselves to the true art of life, to live "wisely and agreeably and well." Mankind would finally have solved "the economic problem," that is, the struggle for existence.

The similarity between John Stuart Mill's concept of the stationary state (see above) and Keynes's predictions in this essay has been noted. It has been argued that although Keynes was right about future growth rates, he underestimated the inequalities prevailing today, both within and across countries. He was also wrong in predicting that greater wealth would induce more leisure spent; in fact, the reverse trend seems to be true.

In his magnum opus on The General Theory of Employment, Interest and Money, Keynes looked only one generation ahead into the future and predicted that state intervention balancing aggregate demand would by then have caused capital accumulation to reach the point of saturation. The marginal efficiency of capital as well as the rate of interest would both be brought down to zero, and — if population was not increasing rapidly — society would finally "... attain the conditions of a quasi-stationary community where change and progress would result only from changes in technique, taste, population and institutions ..." Keynes believed this development would bring about the disappearance of the rentier class, something he welcomed: Keynes argued that rentiers incurred no sacrifice for their earnings, and their savings did not lead to productive investments unless aggregate demand in the economy was sufficiently high. "I see, therefore, the rentier aspect of capitalism as a transitional phase which will disappear when it has done its work."

=== Post-war economic expansion and emerging ecological concerns ===
The economic expansion following World War II took place while mainstream economics largely neglected the importance of natural resources and environmental constraints in the development. Addressing this discrepancy, ecological concerns emerged in academia around 1970. Later on, these concerns developed into the formation of ecological economics as an academic subdiscipline in economics.

=== Post-war economic expansion and the neglect of mainstream economics ===
After the ravages of World War II, the industrialised part of the world experienced almost three decades of unprecedented and prolonged economic expansion. This expansion — known today as the Post–World War II economic expansion — was brought about by international financial stability, low oil prices and ever increasing labour productivity in manufacturing. During the era, all the advanced countries who founded — or later joined — the OECD enjoyed robust and sustained growth rates as well as full employment. In the 1970s, the expansion ended with the 1973 oil crisis, resulting in the 1973–75 recession and the collapse of the Bretton Woods monetary system.

Throughout this era, mainstream economics — dominated by both neoclassical economics and Keynesian economics — developed theories and models where natural resources and environmental constraints were neglected. Conservation issues related specifically to agriculture and forestry were left to specialists in the subdiscipline of environmental economics at the margins of the mainstream. As the theoretical framework of neoclassical economics — namely general equilibrium theory — was uncritically adopted and maintained by even environmental economics, this subdiscipline was rendered largely unable to consider important issues of concern to environmental policy.

In the years around 1970, the widening discrepancy between an ever-growing world economy on the one hand, and a mainstream economics discipline not taking into account the importance of natural resources and environmental constraints on the other hand, was finally addressed — indeed, challenged — in academia by a few unorthodox economists and researchers.

=== Emerging ecological concerns ===
During the short period of time from 1966 to 1972, four works were published addressing the importance of natural resources and the environment to human society:

- In his 1966 philosophical-minded essay on The Economics of the Coming Spaceship Earth, economist and systems scientist Kenneth E. Boulding argued that mankind would soon have to adapt to economic principles much different than the past 'open earth' of illimitable plains and exploitative behaviour. On the basis of the thermodynamic principle of the conservation of matter and energy, Boulding developed the view that the flow of natural resources through the economy is a rough measure of the Gross national product (GNP); and, consequently, that society should start regarding the GNP as a cost to be minimized rather than a benefit to be maximized. Therefore, mankind would have to find its place in a cyclical ecological system without unlimited reservoirs of anything, either for extraction or for pollution — like a spaceman on board a spaceship. Boulding was not the first to make use of the 'Spaceship Earth' metaphor, but he was the one who combined this metaphor with the analysis of natural resource flows through the economy.
- In his 1971 magnum opus on The Entropy Law and the Economic Process, Romanian American economist Nicholas Georgescu-Roegen integrated the thermodynamic concept of entropy with economic analysis, and argued that all natural resources are irreversibly degraded when put to use in economic activity. What happens in the economy is that all matter and energy is transformed from states available for human purposes (valuable natural resources) to states unavailable for human purposes (valueless waste and pollution). In the history of economic thought, Georgescu-Roegen was also the first economist of some standing to theorise on the premise that all of earth's mineral resources will eventually be exhausted at some point (see below).
- Also in 1971, pioneering ecologist and general systems analyst Howard T. Odum published his book on Environment, Power and Society, where he described human society in terms of ecology. He formulated the maximum power principle, according to which all organisms, ecosystems and human societies organise themselves in order to maximize their use of available energy for survival. Odum pointed out that those human societies with access to the higher quality of energy sources enjoyed an advantage over other societies in the Darwinian evolutionary struggle. Odum later co-developed the concept of emergy (i.e., embodied energy) and made other valuable contributions to ecology and systems analysis. His work provided the biological term 'ecology' with its broader societal meaning used today.

- In 1972, environmental scientist and systems analyst Donella Meadows and her team of researchers had their study on The Limits to Growth published by the Club of Rome. The Meadows team modelled aggregate trends in the world economy and made the projection — not prediction — that by the mid to latter part of the 21st century, industrial production per capita, food supply per capita and world population would all reach a peak, and then rapidly decline in a vicious overshoot-and-collapse trajectory. Due to its dire pessimism, the study was scorned and dismissed by most mainstream economists at the time of its publication. However, well into the 21st century, several independent researchers have confirmed that world economic trends so far do indeed match up to the original 'standard run' projections made by the Meadows team, indicating that a global collapse may still loom large in the not too distant future.

Taken together, these four works were seminal in bringing about the formation of ecological economics later on.

=== Formation of ecological economics as an academic subdiscipline ===
Although most of the theoretical and foundational work behind ecological economics was in place by the early 1970s, a long gestation period elapsed before this new academic subdiscipline in economics was properly named and institutionalized. Ecological economics was formally founded in 1988 as the culmination of a series of conferences and meetings through the 1980s, where key scholars interested in the ecology-economy interdependency were interacting with each other. The most important people involved in the establishment were Herman Daly and Robert Costanza from the US; AnnMari Jansson from Sweden; and Juan Martínez-Alier from Spain (Catalonia). Since 1989, the discipline has been organised in the International Society for Ecological Economics that publishes the journal of Ecological Economics.

In the decades that followed, a growing number of academics and writers within ecological economics and related fields have emphasized the biophysical limits to economic expansion and developed alternative frameworks such as the concepts of the steady-state economy and degrowth.

When the ecological economics subdiscipline was established, Herman Daly's 'preanalytic vision' of the economy was widely shared among the members who joined in: The human economy is an open subsystem of a finite and non-growing ecosystem (earth's natural environment), and any subsystem of a fixed nongrowing system must itself at some point also become nongrowing. Indeed, it has been argued that the subdiscipline itself was born out of frustration with the unwillingness of the established disciplines to accept this vision. However, ecological economics has since been overwhelmed by the influence and domination of neoclassical economics and its everlasting free market orthodoxy. This development has been deplored by activistic ecological economists as an 'incoherent', 'shallow' and overly 'pragmatic' slide.

=== Herman Daly's concept of a steady-state economy ===
In the 1970s, Herman Daly became the world's leading proponent of a steady-state economy. Throughout his career, Daly published several books and articles on the subject. He also helped to found the Center for the Advancement of the Steady-State Economy (CASSE). He received several prizes and awards in recognition of his work.

According to two independent comparative studies of American Daly's steady-state economics versus the later, competing school of degrowth from continental Europe, no differences of analytical substance exist between the two schools; only, Daly's bureaucratic — or even technocratic — top-down management of the economy fares badly with the more radical grassroots appeal of degrowth, as championed by French political scientist Serge Latouche (see below).

Natural resources flow through the economy only to end up as waste and pollution in the environment.

The premise underlying Daly's concept of a steady-state economy is that the economy is an open subsystem of a finite and non-growing ecosystem (earth's natural environment). The economy is maintained by importing low-entropy matter-energy (resources) from nature; these resources are put through the economy, being transformed and manufactured into goods along the way; eventually, the throughput of matter-energy is exported to the environment as high-entropy waste and pollution. Recycling of material resources is possible, but only by using up some energy resources as well as an additional amount of other material resources; and energy resources, in turn, cannot be recycled at all, but are dissipated as waste heat. Out of necessity, then, any subsystem of a fixed nongrowing system must itself at some point also become nongrowing.

Daly argues that nature has provided basically two sources of wealth at man's disposal, namely a stock of terrestrial mineral resources and a flow of solar energy. An 'asymmetry' between these two sources of wealth exist in that we may — within some practical limits — extract the mineral stock at a rate of our own choosing (that is, rapidly), whereas the flow of solar energy is reaching earth at a rate beyond human control. Since the Sun will continue to shine on earth at a fixed rate for billions of years to come, it is the terrestrial mineral stock — and not the Sun — that constitutes the crucial scarcity factor regarding man's economic future.

Daly points out that today's global ecological problems are rooted in man's historical record: Until the Industrial Revolution that took place in Britain in the second half of the 18th century, man lived within the limits imposed by what Daly terms a 'solar-income budget': The Palaeolithic tribes of hunter-gatherers and the later agricultural societies of the Neolithic and onwards subsisted primarily — though not exclusively — on earth's biosphere, powered by an ample supply of renewable energy, received from the Sun. The Industrial Revolution changed this situation completely, as man began extracting the terrestrial mineral stock at a rapidly increasing rate. The original solar-income budget was thereby broken and supplemented by the new, but much scarcer source of wealth. Mankind still lives in the after-effect of this revolution.

Daly cautions that more than two hundred years of worldwide industrialisation is now confronting mankind with a range of problems pertaining to the future existence and survival of our species:

The entire evolution of the biosphere has occurred around a fixed point — the constant solar-energy budget. Modern man is the only species to have broken the solar-income budget constraint, and this has thrown him out of equilibrium with the rest of the biosphere. Natural cycles have become overloaded, and new materials have been produced for which no natural cycles exist. Not only is geological capital being depleted, but the basic life-support services of nature are impaired in their functioning by too large a throughput from the human sector.

Following the work of Nicholas Georgescu-Roegen, Daly argues that the laws of thermodynamics restrict all human technologies and apply to all economic systems:

Entropy is the basic physical coordinate of scarcity. Were it not for entropy, we could burn the same gallon of gasoline over and over, and our capital stock would never wear out. Technology is unable to rise above the basic laws of physics, so there is no question of ever 'inventing' a way to recycle energy.

This view on the role of technology in the economy was later termed 'entropy pessimism' (see below).

In Daly's view, mainstream economists tend to regard natural resource scarcity as only a relative phenomenon, while human needs and wants are granted absolute status: It is believed that the price mechanism and technological development (however defined) is capable of overcoming any scarcity ever to be faced on earth; it is also believed that all human wants could and should be treated alike as absolutes, from the most basic necessities of life to the extravagant and insatiable craving for luxuries. Daly terms this belief 'growthmania', which he finds pervasive in modern society. In opposition to the dogma of growthmania, Daly submits that "... there is such a thing as absolute scarcity, and there is such a thing as purely relative and trivial wants". Once it is recognised that scarcity is imposed by nature in an absolute form by the laws of thermodynamics and the finitude of earth; and that some human wants are only relative and not worthy of satisfying; then we are all well on the way to the paradigm of a steady-state economy, Daly concludes.

Consequently, Daly recommends that a system of permanent government restrictions on the economy is established as soon as possible, a steady-state economy. Whereas the classical economists believed that the final stationary state would settle by itself as the rate of profit fell and capital accumulation came to an end (see above), Daly wants to create the steady-state politically by establishing three institutions of the state as a superstructure on top of the present market economy:

- The first institution is to correct inequality to some extent by putting minimum and maximum limits on incomes, maximum limits on wealth, and then redistribute accordingly.
- The second institution is to stabilise the population by issuing transferable reproduction licenses to all fertile women at a level corresponding with the general replacement fertility in society.
- The third institution is to stabilise the level of capital by issuing and selling depletion quotas that impose quantitative restrictions on the flow of resources through the economy. Quotas effectively minimise the throughput of resources necessary to maintain any given level of capital (as opposed to taxes, that merely alter the prevailing price structure).

The purpose of these three institutions is to stop and prevent further growth by combining what Daly calls "a nice reconciliation of efficiency and equity" and providing "the ecologically necessary macrocontrol of growth with the least sacrifice in terms of microlevel freedom and variability."

Among the generation of his teachers, Daly ranks Nicholas Georgescu-Roegen and Kenneth E. Boulding as the two economists he has learned the most from. However, both Georgescu-Roegen and Boulding have assessed that a steady-state economy may serve only as a temporary societal arrangement for mankind when facing the long-term issue of global mineral resource exhaustion: Even with a constant stock of people and capital, and a minimised (yet constant) flow of resources put through the world economy, earth's mineral stock will still be exhausted, although at a slower rate than is presently the situation (see below).

Responding specifically to the criticism levelled at him by Georgescu-Roegen, Daly concedes that a steady-state economy will serve only to postpone, and not to prevent, the inevitable mineral resource exhaustion: "A steady-state economy cannot last forever, but neither can a growing economy, nor a declining economy". A frank and committed Protestant, Daly further argues that...

... the steady-state economy is based on the assumption that creation will have an end — that it is finite temporally as well as spatially. ... Only God can raise any part of his creation out of time and into eternity. As mere stewards of creation, all we can do is to avoid wasting the limited capacity of creation to support present and future life.

Later, several other economists in the field have agreed that not even a steady-state economy can last forever on earth.

== Connection with other ideologies and movements ==
The concept of a steady-state economy is connected to other concepts that can be generally defined as ecological economics and anti-consumerism, because it serves as the final target of those concepts: Those ideologies are not calling for poverty but want to reach a level of consumption that is the best for people and the environment.

=== Degrowth ===
In his article on Economic de-growth vs. steady-state economy, Christian Kerschner has integrated the strategy of declining-state, or degrowth, with Herman Daly's concept of the steady-state economy to the effect that degrowth should be considered a path taken by the rich industrialized countries leading towards a globally equitable steady-state economy. This ultra-egalitarian path will then make ecological room for poorer countries to catch up and combine into a final world steady-state, maintained at some internationally agreed upon intermediate and 'optimum' level of activity for some period of time — although not forever. Kerschner admits that this goal of a world steady-state may remain unattainable in the foreseeable future, but such seemingly unattainable goals could stimulate visions about how to better approach them.

=== The concept of Overdevelopment by Leopold Cohr ===
In 1977 Leopold Kohr published a book named The Overdeveloped Nations: The Diseconomies Of Scale, talking primarily about overconsumption. This book is the basis for the theory of overdevelopment: the idea that the global north -- the "rich" countries -- are too developed, which increases humanity's ecological impact and creates problems in both overdeveloped and underdeveloped countries.

== Conceptual and ideological disagreements ==
Several conceptual and ideological disagreements presently exist concerning the steady-state economy in particular and the dilemma of growth in general. The following issues are considered below: The role of technology; resource decoupling and the rebound effect; a declining-state economy; the possibility of having capitalism without growth; and the possibility of pushing some of the terrestrial limits into outer space.

In 2019 a research, presenting an overview of the attempts to achieve constant economic growth without environmental destruction and their results, was published. It shows that by the year 2019 the attempts were not successful. It does not give a clear answer about future attempts.

Herman Daly's approach to these issues are presented throughout the text.

=== Role of technology ===
Technology is usually defined as the application of scientific method in the production of goods or in other social achievements. Historically, technology has mostly been developed and implemented in order to improve labour productivity and increase living standards. In economics, disagreement presently exists regarding the role of technology when considering its dependency on natural resources:

- In neoclassical economics, on the one hand, the role of 'technology' is usually represented as yet another factor of production contributing to economic growth, like land, labour and capital contribute. However, in neoclassical production functions, where the output of produced goods are related to the inputs provided by the factors of production, no mention is made of the contribution of natural resources to the production process. Hence, 'technology' is reified as a separate, self-contained device, capable of contributing to production without receiving any natural resource inputs beforehand. This representation of 'technology' also prevails in standard mainstream economics textbooks on the subject.

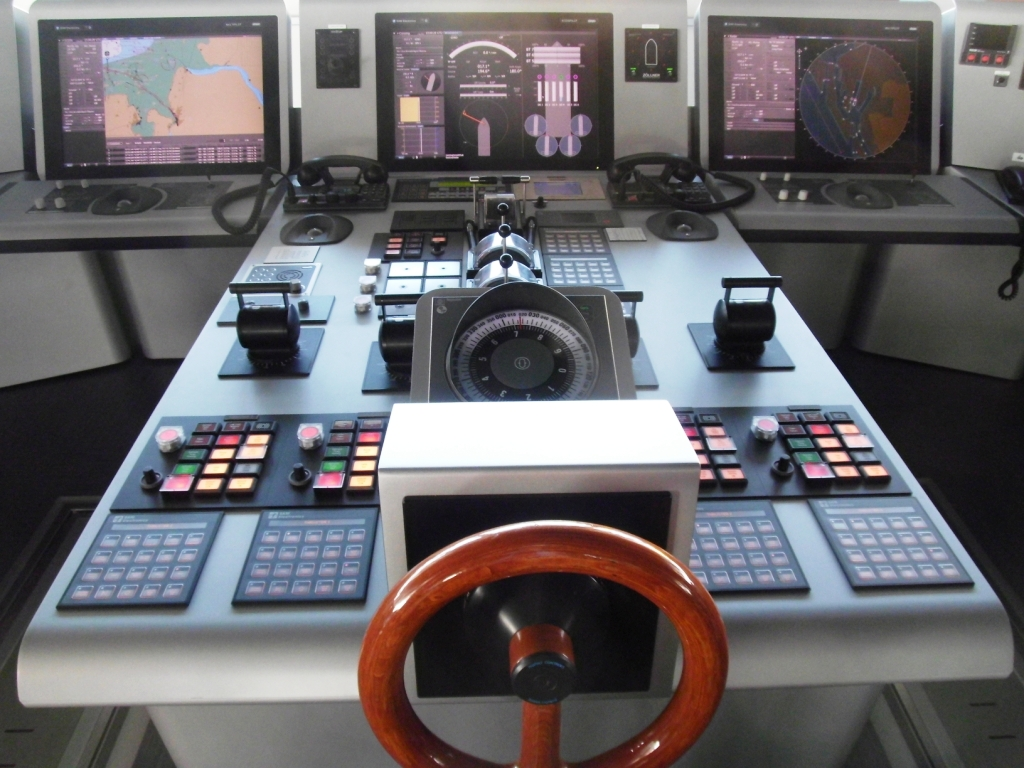
Technology is usually dependent on fuel or electricity for its operation.

- In ecological economics, on the other hand, 'technology' is represented as the way natural resources are transformed in the production process. Hence, Herman Daly argues that the role of technology in the economy cannot be properly conceptualized without taking into account the flow of natural resources necessary to support the technology itself: An internal combustion engine runs on fuels; machinery and electric devices run on electricity; all capital equipment is made out of material resources to begin with. In physical terms, any technology — useful though it is — works largely as a medium for transforming valuable natural resources into material goods that eventually end up as valueless waste and pollution, thereby increasing the entropy — or disorder — of the world as a whole. This view of the role of technology in the economy has been termed 'entropy pessimism'.

From the ecological point of view, it has been suggested that the disagreement boils down to a matter of teaching some elementary physics to the uninitiated neoclassical economists and other technological optimists. From the neoclassical point of view, leading growth theorist and Nobel Prize laureate Robert Solow has defended his much criticised position by replying in 1997 that 'elementary physics' has not by itself prevented growth in the industrialized countries so far.

=== Resource decoupling and the rebound effect ===
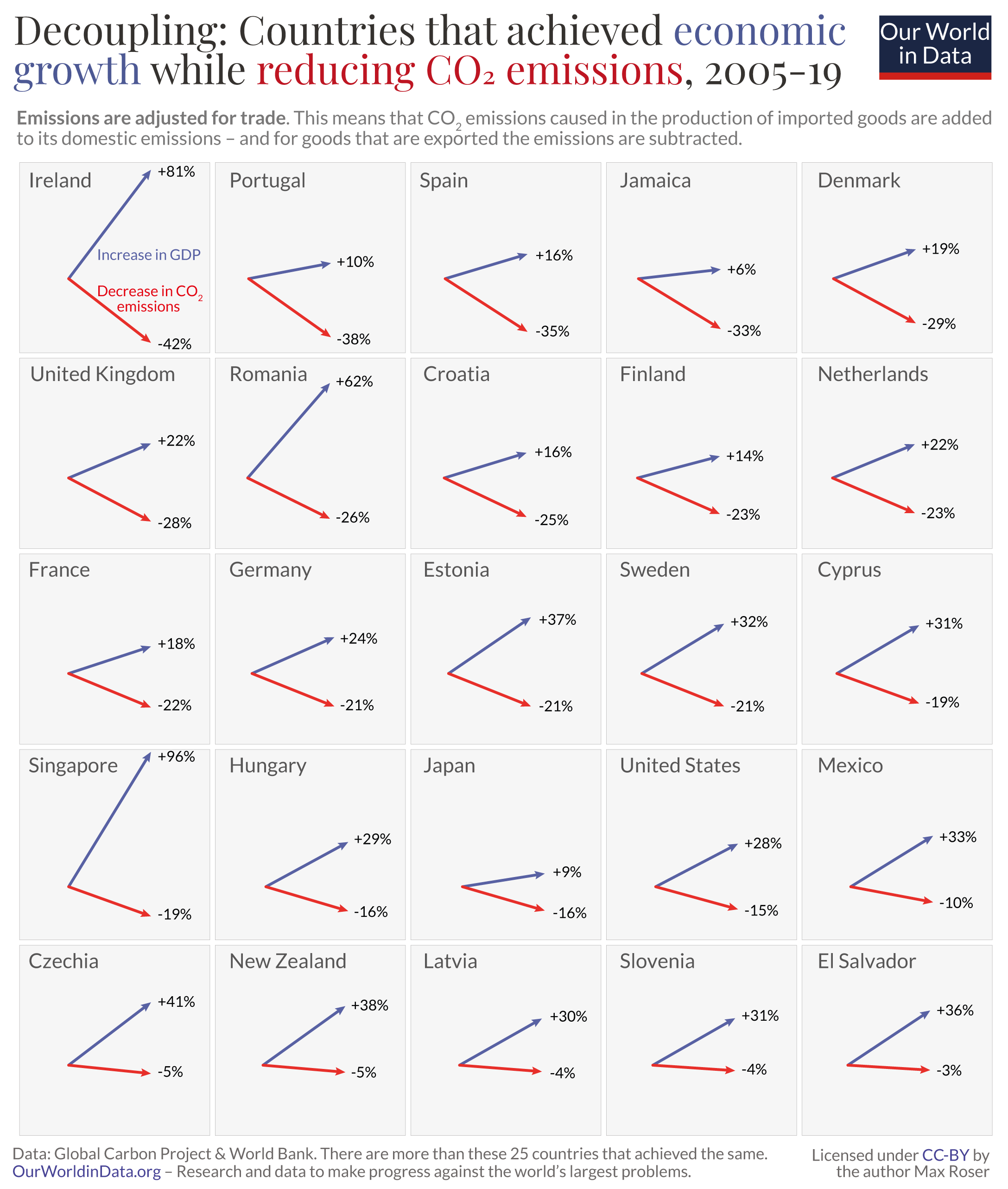
Examples of countries with absolute decoupling of GHG-Emissions and economic growth

Resource decoupling occurs when economic activity becomes less intensive ecologically: A declining input of natural resources is needed to produce one unit of output on average, measured by the ratio of total natural resource consumption to gross domestic product (GDP). Relative resource decoupling occurs when natural resource consumption declines on a ceteris paribus assumption — that is, all other things being equal. Absolute resource decoupling occurs when natural resource consumption declines, even while GDP is growing.

In the history of economic thought, William Stanley Jevons was the first economist of some standing to analyse the occurrence of resource decoupling, although he did not use this term. In his 1865 book on The Coal Question, Jevons argued that an increase in energy efficiency would by itself lead to more, not less, consumption of energy: Due to the income effect of the lowered energy expenditures, people would be rendered better off and demand even more energy, thereby outweighing the initial gain in efficiency. This mechanism is known today as the Jevons paradox or the rebound effect. Jevons's analysis of this seeming paradox formed part of his general concern that Britain's industrial supremacy in the 19th century would soon be set back by the inevitable exhaustion of the country's coal mines, whereupon the geopolitical balance of power would tip in favour of countries abroad possessing more abundant mines.

In 2009, two separate studies were published that — among other things — addressed the issues of resource decoupling and the rebound effect: German scientist and politician Ernst Ulrich von Weizsäcker published Factor Five: Transforming the Global Economy through 80% Improvements in Resource Productivity, co-authored with a team of researchers from The Natural Edge Project. British ecological economist Tim Jackson published Prosperity Without Growth, drawing extensively from an earlier report authored by him for the UK Sustainable Development Commission. Consider each in turn:

- Ernst Ulrich von Weizsäcker argues that a new economic wave of innovation and investment — based on increasing resource productivity, renewable energy, industrial ecology and other green technology — will soon kick off a 'Green Kondratiev' cycle, named after the Russian economist Nikolai Kondratiev. This new long-term cycle is expected to bring about as much as an 80 percent increase in resource productivity, or what amounts to a 'Factor Five' improvement of the gross input per output ratio in the economy, and reduce environmental impact accordingly, von Weizsäcker promises. Regarding the adverse rebound effect, von Weizsäcker notes that "... efforts to improve efficiency have been fraught with increasing overall levels of consumption." As remedies, von Weizsäcker recommends three separate approaches: Recycling of and imposing restrictions on the use of materials; establishing capital funds from natural resource proceeds for reinvestments in order to compensate for the future bust caused by depletion; and finally, taxing resource consumption so as to balance it with the available supplies.
- Tim Jackson points out that according to empirical evidence, the world economy has indeed experienced some relative resource decoupling: In the period from 1970 to 2009, the 'energy intensity' — that is, the energy content embodied in world GDP—decreased by 33 percent; but as the world economy also kept growing, carbon dioxide emissions from fossil fuels have increased by 80 percent during the same period of time. Hence, no absolute energy resource decoupling materialized. Regarding key metal resources, the development was even worse in that not even relative resource decoupling have materialized in the period from 1990 to 2007: The extraction of iron ore, bauxite, copper and nickel was rising faster than world GDP to the effect that "resource efficiency is going in the wrong direction," mostly due to emerging economies — notably China — building up their infrastructure. Jackson concludes his survey by noting that the 'dilemma of growth' is evident when any resource efficiency squeezed out of the economy will sooner or later be pushed back up again by a growing GDP. Jackson further cautions that "simplistic assumptions that capitalism's propensity for efficiency will stabilize the climate and solve the problem of resource scarcity are almost literally bankrupt."

Herman Daly has argued that the best way to increase natural resource efficiency (decouple) and to prevent the occurrence of any rebound effects is to impose quantitative restrictions on resource use by establishing a cap and trade system of quotas, managed by a government agency. Daly believes this system features a unique triple advantage:

- Absolute and permanent limits are set on the extraction rate of, use of and pollution with the resources flowing through the economy; as opposed to taxes that merely alter the prevailing price structure without stopping growth; and as opposed to pollution standards and control which are both costly and difficult to enact and enforce.
- More efficiency and recycling efforts are induced by the higher resource prices resulting from the restrictions (quota prices plus regular extraction costs).
- No rebound effects are able to appear, as any temporary excess demand will result only in inflation or shortages, or both — and not in increased supply, which is to remain constant and limited on a permanent basis.

For all its merits, Daly himself points to the existence of physical, technological and practical limitations to how much efficiency and recycling can be achieved by this proposed system. The idea of absolute decoupling ridding the economy as a whole of any dependence on natural resources is ridiculed polemically by Daly as 'angelizing GDP': It would work only if we ascended to become angels ourselves.

=== Declining-state economy ===
Romanian American economist Nicholas Georgescu-Roegen was the teacher and mentor of Herman Daly and is presently considered the main intellectual figure influencing the degrowth movement that formed in France and Italy in the early 2000s. In his paradigmatic magnum opus on The Entropy Law and the Economic Process, Georgescu-Roegen argues that the carrying capacity of earth — that is, earth's capacity to sustain human populations and consumption levels — is bound to decrease sometime in the future as earth's finite stock of mineral resources is presently being extracted and put to use; and consequently, that the world economy as a whole is heading towards an inevitable future collapse. In effect, Georgescu-Roegen points out that the arguments advanced by Herman Daly in support of his steady-state economy apply with even greater force in support of a declining-state economy: When the overall purpose is to ration and stretch mineral resource use for as long time into the future as possible, zero economic growth is more desirable than growth is, true; but negative growth is better still! Instead of Daly's steady-state economics, Georgescu-Roegen proposed his own so-called 'minimal bioeconomic program', featuring restrictions even more severe than those propounded by his former student Daly (see above).

American political advisor Jeremy Rifkin, French champion of the degrowth movement Serge Latouche and Austrian degrowth theorist Christian Kerschner — who all take their cue from Georgescu-Roegen's work — have argued in favour of declining-state strategies. Consider each in turn:

- In his book on Entropy: A New World View, Jeremy Rifkin argues that the impending exhaustion of earth's mineral resources will mark the decline of the industrial age, followed by the advent of a new solar age, based on renewable solar power. Due to the diffuse, low-intensity property of solar radiation, this source of energy is incapable of sustaining industrialism, whether capitalist or socialist. Consequently, Rifkin advocates an anarcho-primitivist future solar economy — or what he terms an 'entropic society' — based on anti-consumerism, deindustrialization, counterurbanization, organic farming and prudential restraints on childbirths. Rifkin cautions that the transition to the solar age is likely to become a troublesome phase in the history of mankind, as the present world economy is so dependent on the non-renewable mineral resources.
- In his manifesto on Farewell to Growth, Serge Latouche develops a strategy of so-called 'ecomunicipalism' to initiate a 'virtuous cycle of quiet contraction' or degrowth of economic activity at the local level of society: Consumption patterns and addiction to work should be reduced; systems of fair taxation and consumption permits should redistribute the gains from economic activity within and among countries; obsolescence and waste should be reduced, products designed so as to make recycling easier. This bottom-up strategy opposes overconsumption in rich countries as well as emerging, poor countries to aspire this overconsumption of the rich. Instead, the purpose of degrowth is to establish the convivial and sustainable society where people can live better lives whilst working and consuming less. Latouche further cautions that "the very survival of humanity ... means that ecological concerns must be a central part of our social, political, cultural and spiritual preoccupation with human life."

Herman Daly on his part is not opposed to the concept of a declining-state economy; but he does point out that the steady-state economy should serve as a preliminary first step on a declining path, once the optimal levels of population and capital have been properly defined. However, this first step is an important one:

[T]he first issue remains to stop the momentum of growth and to learn to run a stable economy at historically given initial conditions. ... But we cannot go into reverse without first coming to a stop. Step one is to achieve a steady-state economy at existing or nearby levels. Step two is to decide whether the optimum level is greater or less than present levels. ... My own judgment on these issues lead me to think we have overshot the optimum."

Daly concedes that it is 'difficult, probably impossible' to define such optimum levels; even more, in his final analysis Daly agrees with his teacher and mentor Georgescu-Roegen that no defined optimum will be able to last forever (see above).

=== Capitalism without growth ===
Several radical critics of capitalism have questioned the possibility of ever imposing a steady-state or a declining-state (degrowth) system as a superstructure on top of capitalism. Taken together, these critics point to the following growth dynamics inherent in capitalism:

- Economic activity is generally guided by the profit motive, a competitive work ethos and the drive to accumulate capital and wealth for its own sake to gratify personal ambition, provide social prestige — or simply to get rich in a hurry. Psychologically, these drives in the work sphere repress and distort biological and social homeostasis in most people.
- Employments and incomes depend directly on sales revenues, that is, on people spending money on the consumption of goods and services for sale on the market. This dependency creates a pecuniary incentive to increase sales as much as possible. To this end, much cunning advertising is devised to manipulate human wants and prop up consumption patterns, often resulting in lavish and wasteful consumerism.
- The financial system is based on fractional-reserve banking, enabling commercial banks to hold reserves in amounts that are less than their deposit liabilities. This credit creation is multiplying the monetary base supplied by the central bank in order to assist private corporations expanding their activities.
- Technological development exhibits a strong labour-saving bias, creating the need to provide new employment elsewhere in the economy for workers displaced by the introduction of new technology.
- Private corporations generally resist government regulations and restrictions that impede profits and deter investment opportunities. Attempts to downscale the economy would rapidly degenerate into economic crisis and political instability on this count alone.
- Governments need tax revenues to service their debt obligations, run their institutions and finance their welfare programmes for the benefit of the public. Tax revenues are collected from general economic activity.
- In the capitalist world economy, globalisation intensifies competition everywhere, both within and between countries. National governments are compelled to compete and struggle with each other to provide employment, investments, tax revenues and wealth for their own populations.

— In short: There is no end to the systemic and ecologically harmful growth dynamics in modern capitalism, radical critics assert.

Fully aware of the massive growth dynamics of capitalism, Herman Daly on his part poses the rhetorical question whether his concept of a steady-state economy is essentially capitalistic or socialistic. He provides the following answer (written in 1980):

The growth versus steady-state debate really cuts across the old left-right rift, and we should resist any attempt to identify either growth or steady-state with either left or right, for two reasons. First, it will impose a logical distortion on the issue. Second, it will obscure the emergence of a third way, which might form a future synthesis of socialism and capitalism into a steady-state economy and eventually into a fully just and sustainable society.

Daly concludes by inviting all (most) people — both liberal supporters of and radical critics of capitalism — to join him in his effort to develop a steady-state economy.

=== Pushing some of the terrestrial limits into outer space ===
Ever since the beginning of the modern Space Age in the 1950s, some space advocates have pushed for space habitation, frequently in the form of colonization, some arguing as a reason for alleviating human overpopulation, overconsumption and mitigate the human impact on the environment on Earth (if not for other reasons).

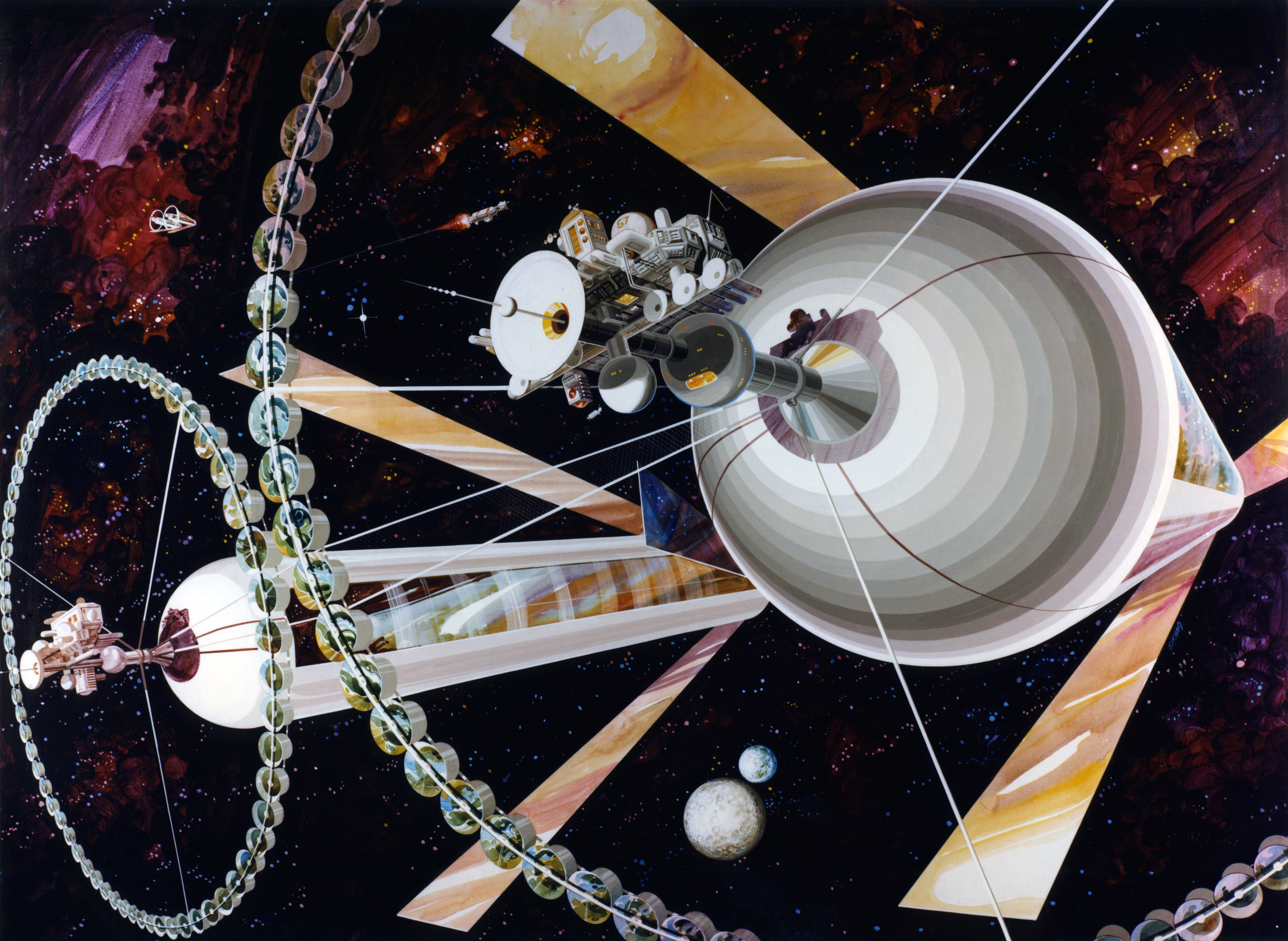
O'Neill wanted colonists to settle in specially designed cylinders in outer space.

In the 1970s, physicist and space activist Gerard K. O'Neill developed a large plan to build human settlements in outer space to solve the problems of overpopulation and limits to growth on earth without recourse to political repression. According to O'Neill's vision, mankind could — and indeed should — expand on this man-made frontier to many times the current world population and generate large amounts of new wealth in space. Herman Daly countered O'Neill's vision by arguing that a space colony would become subject to much harsher limits to growth — and hence, would have to be secured and managed with much more care and discipline — than a steady-state economy on large and resilient earth. Although the number of individual colonies supposedly could be increased without end, living conditions in any one particular colony would become very restricted nonetheless. Therefore, Daly concluded: "The alleged impossibility of a steady-state on earth provides a poor intellectual launching pad for space colonies."

By the 2010s, O'Neill's old vision of space colonisation had long since been turned upside down in many places: Instead of dispatching colonists from earth to live in remote space settlements, some ecology-minded space advocates conjecture that resources could be mined from asteroids in space and transported back to earth for use here. This new vision has the same double advantage of (partly) mitigating ecological pressures on earth's limited mineral reserves while also boosting exploration and colonisation of space. The building up of industrial infrastructure in space would be required for the purpose, as well as the establishment of a complete supply chain up to the level of self-sufficiency and then beyond, eventually developing into a permanent extraterrestrial source of wealth to provide an adequate return on investment for stakeholders. In the future, such an 'exo-economy' (off-planet economy) could possibly even serve as the first step towards mankind's cosmic ascension to a 'Type II' civilisation on the hypothetical Kardashev scale, in case such an ascension will ever be accomplished.

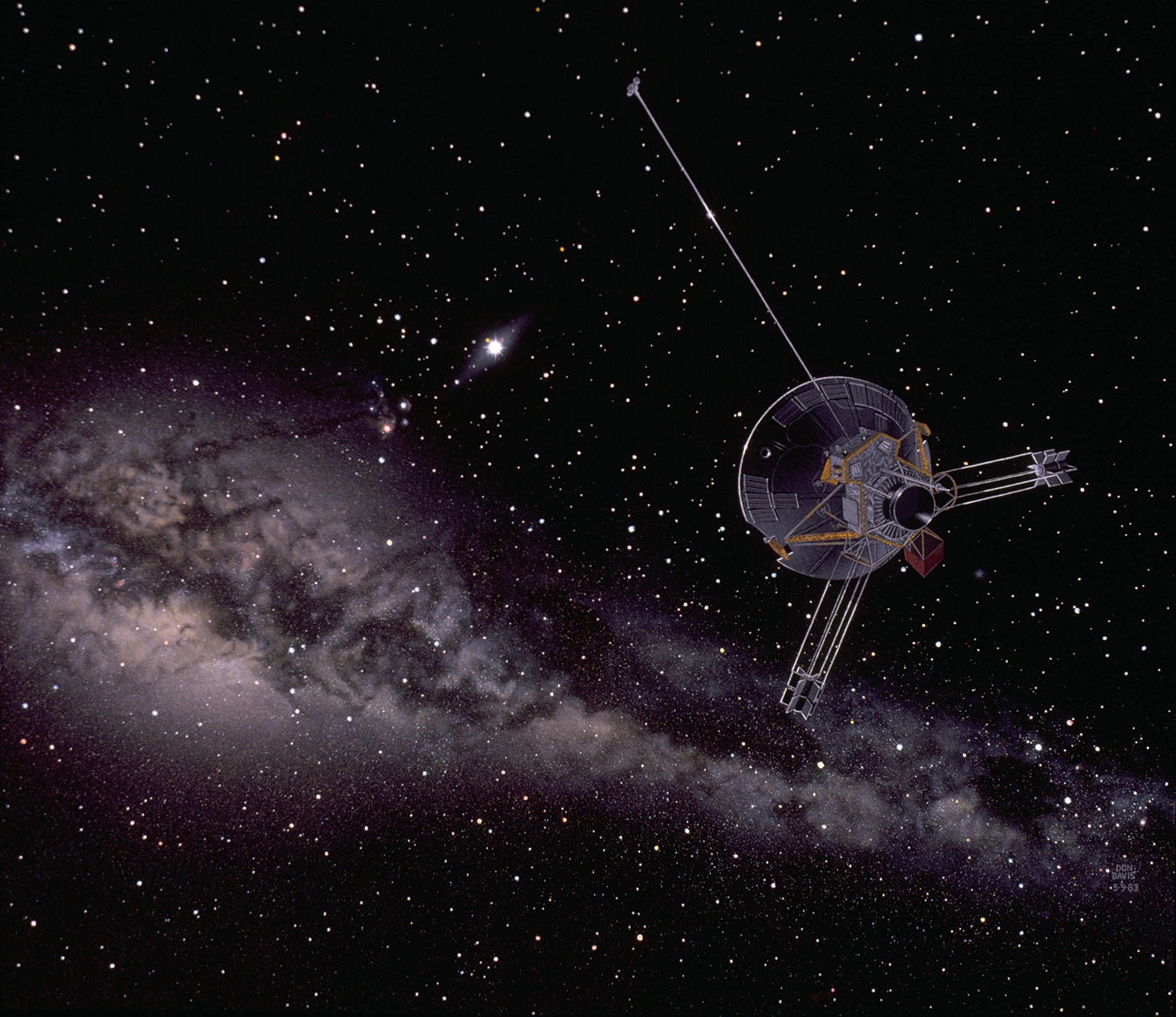
Astronomically long distances and time scales are ever present in space.

However, it is yet uncertain whether an off-planet economy of the type specified will develop in due time to match both the volume and the output mix needed to fully replace earth's dwindling mineral reserves. Sceptics like Herman Daly and others point to exorbitant earth-to-orbit launch costs of any space mission, inaccurate identification of target asteroids suitable for mining, and remote in situ ore extraction difficulties as obvious barriers to success: Investing a lot of terrestrial resources in order to recover only a few resources from space in return is not worthwhile in any case, regardless of the scarcities, technologies and other mission parameters involved in the venture. In addition, even if an off-planet economy could somehow be established at some future point, one long-term predicament would then loom large regarding the continuous mining and transportation of massive volumes of materials from space back to earth: How to keep up that volume flowing on a steady and permanent basis in the face of the astronomically long distances and time scales ever present in space. In the worst of cases, all of these obstacles could forever prevent any substantial pushing of limits into outer space — and then limits to growth on earth will remain the only limits of concern throughout mankind's entire span of existence.

== Criticism ==
Economist Wim Naudé notes that Western economies are already in a state resembling degrowth, which he characterizes as a Great Stagnation. This period is marked by declining levels of entrepreneurship, innovation, scientific output, and research productivity. In a context of prolonged economic stagnation, the economy increasingly resembles a zero-sum system. In such a scenario, improvements in the well-being of one group or country may come at the expense of another, leading to conflict. Naudé refers to the analysis by Thomas Piketty (2014), arguing that low growth leads to very substantial inequality in the distribution of wealth over the long run. According to Naudé economic stagnation makes societies less innovative and less resilient, which hinders the timely development of the technological and organizational innovations needed to prevent ecological overshoot and tackle climate change.

== See also ==
- History of economic thought – Study of the development of economic thought
- Circular economy – Production model to minimise wastage and emissions
- Classical economics – School of thought in economics
- Creative destruction – Concept in economics
- Degrowth – Philosophy calling for reduced consumption and production to achieve sustainability
- Ecological economics – Interdependence of human economies and natural ecosystems
- Economic equilibrium – Situation where economic forces are balanced
- Post-growth – Beyond optimum economic growth
- The Limits to Growth
- Prosperity Without Growth
- Market failure: Ecological market failure
- Environmentalism – Philosophy about Earth protection
- Ecological footprint – Individual's or a group's human demand on nature
- Overlapping generations model – Framework in macroeconomics
- Planetary boundaries – Limits to safe impact on the Earth ecology
- Sustainability: Carrying capacity
- Jevons paradox – Efficiency leads to increased demand
- Kenneth E. Boulding – British-American economist (1910–1993)
- Herman Daly – American economist (1938–2022)
- Nicholas Georgescu-Roegen: Criticising Daly's steady-state economics
