= Post-consumerism =

Post-consumerism is a view or ideology that well-being, as distinct from material prosperity, is the aim of life, and often suggesting that there is a growing willingness to assert such. Post-consumerism can also be viewed as moving beyond the current model of addictive consumerism. This personal and societal strategy utilizes each individual's core values to identify the "satisfaction of enough for today," also called "self-defined enoughness." The intent and outcome of this basic strategy to date has "reached people where they are rather than simply where we are." Therefore the "Do I have enough stuff for now?" campaign "is promoting this intriguing question" regardless of the answer.

== See also ==
- Degrowth
- Gross National Happiness
- Happiness economics
- Happy Planet Index
- Humanistic economics
- Post growth
