= James B. Twitchell =

American author & academic (born 1943)

- Born: 1943 (age 82–83); Burlington, Vermont
- Education: University of North Carolina at Chapel Hill
- Occupations: author, professor
- Writing career
- Language: English

James B. Twitchell is an American author and former professor of English. He was born in 1943, in Burlington, Vermont. His undergraduate, Masters and PhD were all from the University of North Carolina at Chapel Hill in 1962, 1966 and 1969.

Twitchell was a widely published, widely quoted tenured professor at the University of Florida when in 2008 an investigative reporter at the Gainesville Sun found a pattern of plagiarizing passages from other writers' work. The University decided to suspend Twitchell, with reinstatement conditional on Twitchell properly attributing each instance of plagiarism or close paraphrasing. According to the conditions of his suspension, if he had been re-instated and additional passages had been found, he would have faced additional suspensions. Twitchell, who was already in his sixties, chose not to appeal the ruling, and to resign his position. Inside Higher Education quoted Grant McCracken, an anthropologist, author, and blogger whose idea Twitchell had used, characterizing his comment as gracious: "As for Twitchell, it's sad. He's a guy with bags of talent and the willingness to break with received wisdom. I hope he keeps writing."

== Works ==
- James B. Twitchell (2011). Look Away, Dixieland: A Carpetbagger's Great-Grandson Travels Highway 84 in Search of the Shack-Up-On-Cinder-Blocks, Confederate-Flag-Waving, Squirrel-Hunting, Boiled-Peanuts, Deep-Drawl, Don't-Stop-The-Car-Here South. LSU Press. ISBN 9780807137611.
- James B. Twitchell (2008). Where Men Hide. Columbia University Press. ISBN 9780231137355.
- James B. Twitchell (2007). Shopping for God: How Christianity Went from In Your Heart to In Your Face. Simon & Schuster. pp. 105–6. ISBN 9780743292870. "In its most vulgarized and solipsistic state, epiphany is what currently is marketed as a God wink. Here the believer is encouraged to take some coincidence, like winning the lottery or recovering from sickness, as evidence of a higher power at work. So Squire Rushnell, in When God Winks at You: How God Speaks Directly to You Through the Power of Coincidence, tells of a woman who goes to church and just happens to sit next to the birth mother she was seeking. The mother was attending services for the first time! "Every time you receive what some call a coincidence or an answered prayer, it's a direct and personal message of reassurance from God to you," he contends. Narcissism itself becomes proof of divine selection."
- James B. Twitchell (2004). Branded Nation: The Marketing of Megachurch, College Inc., and Museumworld. Simon & Schuster. ISBN 9780743271615. "James B. Twitchell."
- James B. Twitchell (2002). Living It Up: Our Love Affair With Luxury. Columbia University Press. ISBN 9780231124966. "James B. Twitchell."
- James B. Twitchell (2000). Twenty Ads That Shook the World: The Century's Most Groundbreaking Advertising and How It Changed Us All. Random House of Canada. ISBN 9780609807231.
- James B. Twitchell (2000). Lead Us Into Temptation: The Triumph of American Materialism. Columbia University Press. ISBN 9780231115193.
- James B. Twitchell (1998). For Shame: The Loss of Common Decency in American Culture. St. Martin's Press. ISBN 9780312194536. "James B. Twitchell."
- James B. Twitchell (1996). Adcult USA: The Triumph of Advertising in American Culture. Columbia University Press. ISBN 9780231103251.
- James B. Twitchell (1993). Carnival Culture: The Trashing of Taste in America. Columbia University Press. ISBN 9780231078313. "James B. Twitchell."
- James B. Twitchell (1989). Forbidden Partners: The Incest Taboo in Modern Culture. Columbia University Press. ISBN 9780231064132.
- James B. Twitchell (1987). Dreadful Pleasures: An Anatomy of Modern Horror. Oxford University Press. ISBN 9780195050677. "James B. Twitchell."
- James B. Twitchell (1983). Romantic horizons: aspects of the sublime in English poetry and painting, 1770–1850. University of Missouri Press. ISBN 9780826204110.
- James B. Twitchell (1981). The Living Dead: A Study of the Vampire in Romantic Literature. Duke University Press. ISBN 9780822307891.
