= Prosperity Without Growth =

2009 book by Tim Jackson

- Author: Tim Jackson
- Original title: Prosperity without growth? The transition to a sustainable economy (report of the Sustainable Development Commission)
- Language: English
- Subject: Sustainability, economics, post-growth, prosperity
- Genre: Non-fiction
- Published: 2009 (first edition); 2017 (second edition)
- Publisher: Routledge
- Publication place: United Kingdom
- ISBN: 978-1138935419

Tim Jackson presenting the 2017 German edition at Heinrich-Böll-Stiftung, 2017

Prosperity Without Growth is a book by author and economist Tim Jackson. It was originally released as a report by the Sustainable Development Commission. The study rapidly became the most downloaded report in the Commission's nine-year history when published in 2009. Later that year, the report was reworked and published as a book by Earthscan. A revised and expanded edition (Prosperity Without Growth: Foundations for the Economy of Tomorrow) was published in January 2017.

== Description ==
By arguing that "prosperity – in any meaningful sense of the word – transcends material concerns," the book summarizes the evidence showing that, beyond a certain point, growth does not increase human well-being. Prosperity without Growth analyses the complex relationships between economic growth, environmental crises, and social recession. It proposes a route to a sustainable economy and argues for a redefinition of "prosperity" in light of the evidence on what contributes to people’s well-being.

The second edition expands on these ideas and sets out the framework for what he calls "the economy of tomorrow." By attending to the nature of enterprise as a form of social organisation, the meaning of work as participation in society, the function of investment as a commitment to the future; and the role of money as a social good, he demonstrates how the economy may be transformed in ways that protect employment, promote and facilitate social investment, reduce inequality and support both ecological and financial stability.

== Reviews ==
Le Monde described the first edition as "one of the most outstanding pieces of environmental economics literature in recent years." The sociologist Anthony Giddens referred to it as "a must-read for anyone concerned with issues of climate change and sustainability – bold, original and comprehensive." The second edition received endorsements from Yanis Varoufakis, who referred to it as "essential reading for those refusing to succumb to a dystopic future." Noam Chomsky called it a "thoughtful and penetrating critique." Herman Daly praised it: "It is hard to improve a classic, but Jackson has done it... a clearly written yet scholarly union of moral vision, with solid economics." Rowan Williams called it "one of the most important essays of our generation: both visionary and realistic, rooted in careful research and setting out difficult but achievable goals, it gives what we so badly need – an alternative to passivity, short-term selfishness, and cynicism."

== Structure ==
The second edition of Prosperity without growth: Foundations for the Economy of Tomorrow is organised into eleven chapters:

1. The limits to growth
2. Prosperity lost
3. Redefining prosperity
4. The dilemma of growth
5. The myth of decoupling
6. The 'iron cage' of consumerism
7. Flourishing – within limits
8. Foundations for the economy of tomorrow
9. Towards a 'post-growth' macroeconomics
10. The progressive State
11. A lasting prosperity

== Translations ==
Prosperity without Growth: Economics for a Finite Planet (2009) has been translated into eighteen languages including Swedish (Välfärd utan tillväxt: så skapar vi ett hållbart samhälle, 2011), German (Wohlstand ohne Wachstum, 2011), French (Prospérité sans croissance, 2010), Greek (Ευημερία χωρίς ανάπτυξη, 2012), Spanish (Prosperidad sin crecimiento, 2011), Italian (Prosperità senza crescita, 2011), Dutch (Welvaart zonder groei, 2010) and Chinese (无增长的繁荣，2011).

The second edition, Prosperity without Growth: Foundations for the Economy of Tomorrow (2017), has been translated into German, French, Italian, and Danish.

== See also ==
- Degrowth
- Post-growth
- Steady-state economy
- Stern Review
- Material Concerns, a 1996 book by Jackson
