= IEEE 11073 service-oriented device connectivity =

Communication protocol for point-of-care (PoC) medical devices

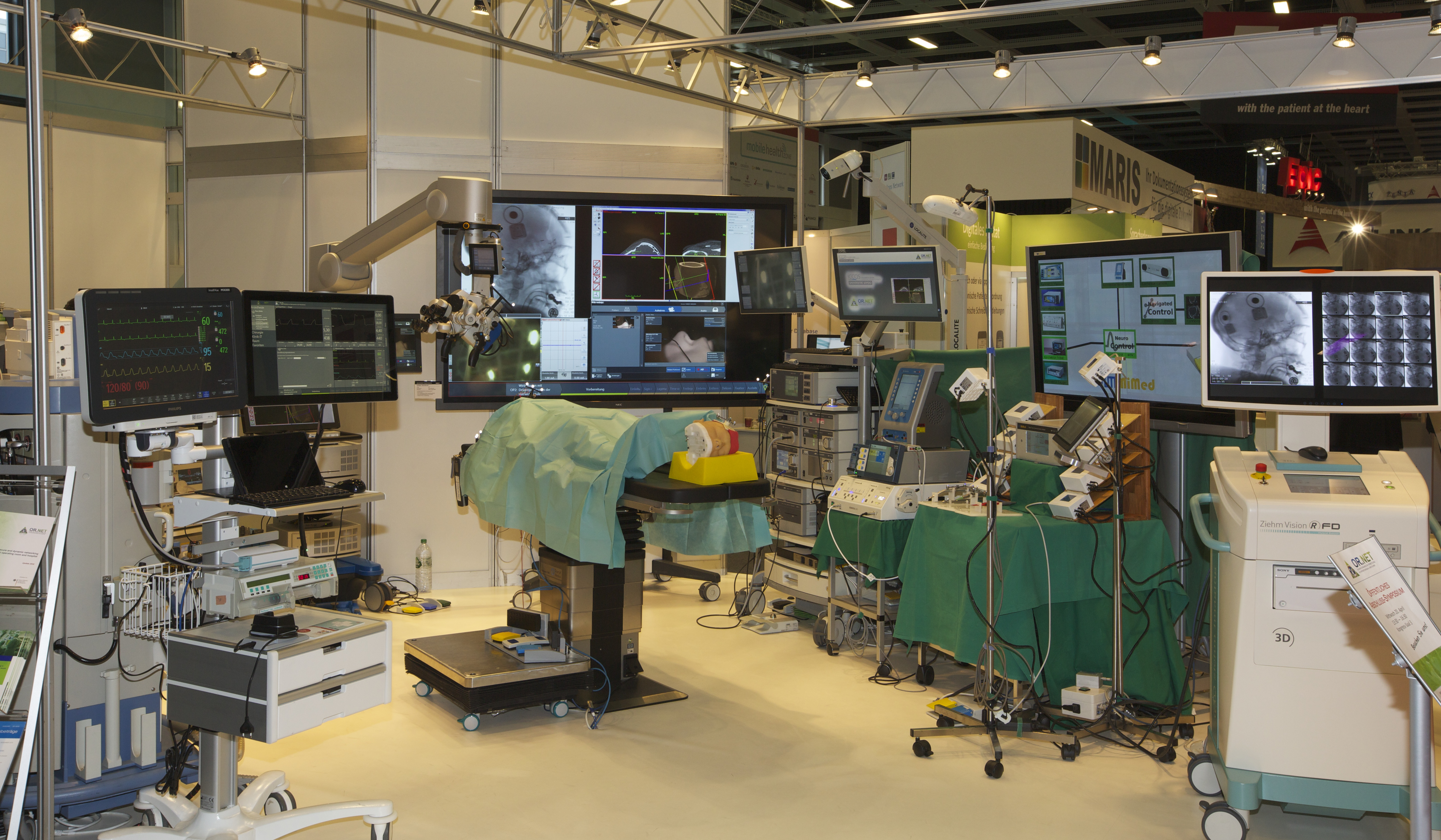
Demonstrator at conhIT trade fair 2016 showing manufacturer-independent medical device interoperability based on IEEE 11073 SDC standards family.

The IEEE 11073 service-oriented device connectivity (SDC) family of standards defines a communication protocol for point-of-care (PoC) medical devices. The main purpose is to enable manufacturer-independent medical device-to-device interoperability. Furthermore, interconnection between medical devices and medical information systems is enabled. However, IEEE 11073 SDC does not compete with established and emerging standards like HL7 v2 or HL7 FHIR. IEEE 11073 SDC is part of the established ISO/IEEE 11073 family of standards.

IEEE 11073 SDC is based on the paradigm of a service-oriented architecture (SOA). The IEEE 11073 SDC family of standards currently comprises three parts: Core Standards, Participant Key Purpose (PKIP) standards, and Devices Specialisation (DevSpec) standards. The Core Standards consist of a transport standard, ISO/IEEE 11073-20702, called Medical Devices Communication Profile for Web Services, a Domain Information and Service Model (ISO/IEEE 11073-10207), and Architecture and Binding definition (ISO/IEEE 11073-20701). While the three core standards have been approved and published by the IEEE as well as by ISO, PKIPs and DevSpecs are currently under development.

The concepts have been technically and clinically evaluated. Comprehensive demonstrators were shown, for example, at the conhIT exhibitions 2016 and 2017.

== IEEE 11073 SDC Core Standards ==
=== ISO/IEEE 11073-20702 ===
The standard "ISO/IEEE International Standard for Health informatics - Point-of-care medical device communication - Part 20702: Medical devices communication profile for web services" (short Medical DPWS or MDPWS) enables the foundational interoperability between medical devices. This includes the ability of medical devices to exchange data safely in a distributed system and the ability to discover network participants dynamically. MDPWS is derived from the OASIS standard Devices Profile for Web Services (DPWS). It defines extensions and restrictions to meet safety requirements of medical devices for high acuity environments.

=== ISO/IEEE 11073-10207 ===
The standard "ISO/IEEE International Standard - Health informatics--Point-of-care medical device communication - Part 10207: Domain Information and Service Model for Service-Oriented Point-of-Care Medical Device Communication" is derived from the IEEE 11073-10201 Domain Information Model. It is designed to meet the requirements of networked systems of medical devices establishing multipoint-to-multipoint communication.

The Domain Information Model defines the capability description of the medical devices as well as the representation of the current state. The Service Model specifies the way in which a service consumer can interact with medical devices, implementing the role of a service provider. IEEE 11073-10207 enables the structural interoperability between medical devices. The non-normative name is Basic Integrated Clinical Environment Protocol Specification (BICEPS).

=== ISO/IEC/IEEE 11073-20701 ===
The "ISO/IEC/IEEE International Standard for Health informatics - Device interoperability - Part 20701:Point-of-care medical device communication--Service oriented medical device exchange architecture and protocol binding" defines the allover service-oriented architecture, specifies the binding between IEEE 11073-20702 and IEEE 11073–10207, and specifies the binding to other standards like Network Time Protocol (NTP) or Differentiated Services (DiffServ) for aspects like time synchronization and Quality of Service (QoS) requirements. Together with the usage of terminology standards (like IEEE 11073-10101), this standard contributes to the semantic interoperability of medical devices. Due to its nature of binding the other SDC standards together, it is often referred to as "SDC GLUE".

== IEEE 11073-1070X Participant Key Purpose (PKP) Series ==
PKPs describe process requirements according to the role of a network participant. While P11073-10700 defines the Base PKP with basic requirements for participating providers and consumers, the three additional PKP standards focus on specific functionalities:

- Providing and consuming information in terms of metric data (IEEE P11073-10701),
- Providing and consuming alerts (IEEE P11073-10702), and
- Providing and consuming external control functionalities (IEEE P11072-10703).

PKPs are thus independent from the particular medical devices and their concrete medical use case. However, they mainly restrict the IEEE 11073 SDC Core standards to enable safe and interoperable medical device systems and to facilitate the approval process.

== IEEE 11073-1072X Devices Specialisation (DevSpec) Series ==
In contrast to PKPs, the DevSpecs are standards for particular classes of medical devices. DevSpecs describe the way the devices are modelled in the network representation and define requirements for the interaction of provider and consumer via SDC, if necessary. Currently, the PoCSpec project develops DevSpecs for High-Frequency Surgical Equipment (IEEE P11073-10721), endoscopic camera and light source (IEEE P11073-10722 and -10723), insufflator (IEEE P11073-10724), and medical suction and irrigation pump (IEEE P11073-10725). Modules that can be used by different types of device are defined in the so-called Module Specifications (ModSpecs, IEEE P11073-10720).

== Open Source Implementations ==
There are open source libraries available implementing the IEEE 11073 SDC standards:

- SDCLib/C (written in C++, formerly known as OSCLib)
- SDCLib/J (written in Java, formerly known as SoftICE)
- SDCLib/J (fork) (written in Java, fork of the former main author which implements the latest features)
- SDCri (SDC Reference Implementation) (written in Java)
- sdc11073 (written in Python, formerly known as pySDC)
- protoSDC-rs (written in Rust)
- openSDC (written in Java, not maintained since 2019)
