= Secure Digital Container =

Methods of licensing academic software

Secure Digital Container (SDC) is a compressed, encrypted executable file type that is made and used by the e-academy License Management System (ELMS) for secure downloads of primarily academic software. After being downloaded, it is decrypted and the software is extracted. The SDC file is created by e-academy for distribution of academic software purchased or freely downloaded by its academic user base. It cannot be opened without the Secure Delivery Client.

The Secure delivery client requests permission from ELMS to download. If ELMS denied the request, the download does not proceed. There is also a limited number of downloads a customer could use. When download count hits zero, a customer would be unable to download more copies of the software.

Older SDC files have weak protection and can be unpacked with the UnpackSDC 1.1 tool.

Recently related SDX files have been introduced. They are metadata for Secure Download Manager, which downloads either normal EXE/MSI files or encrypted SDC files and automatically decrypts them.

== See also ==
- DreamSpark
- MSDNAA
