= Tim Jackson (economist) =

British ecological economist (born 1957)

Tim Jackson FRSA FAcSS
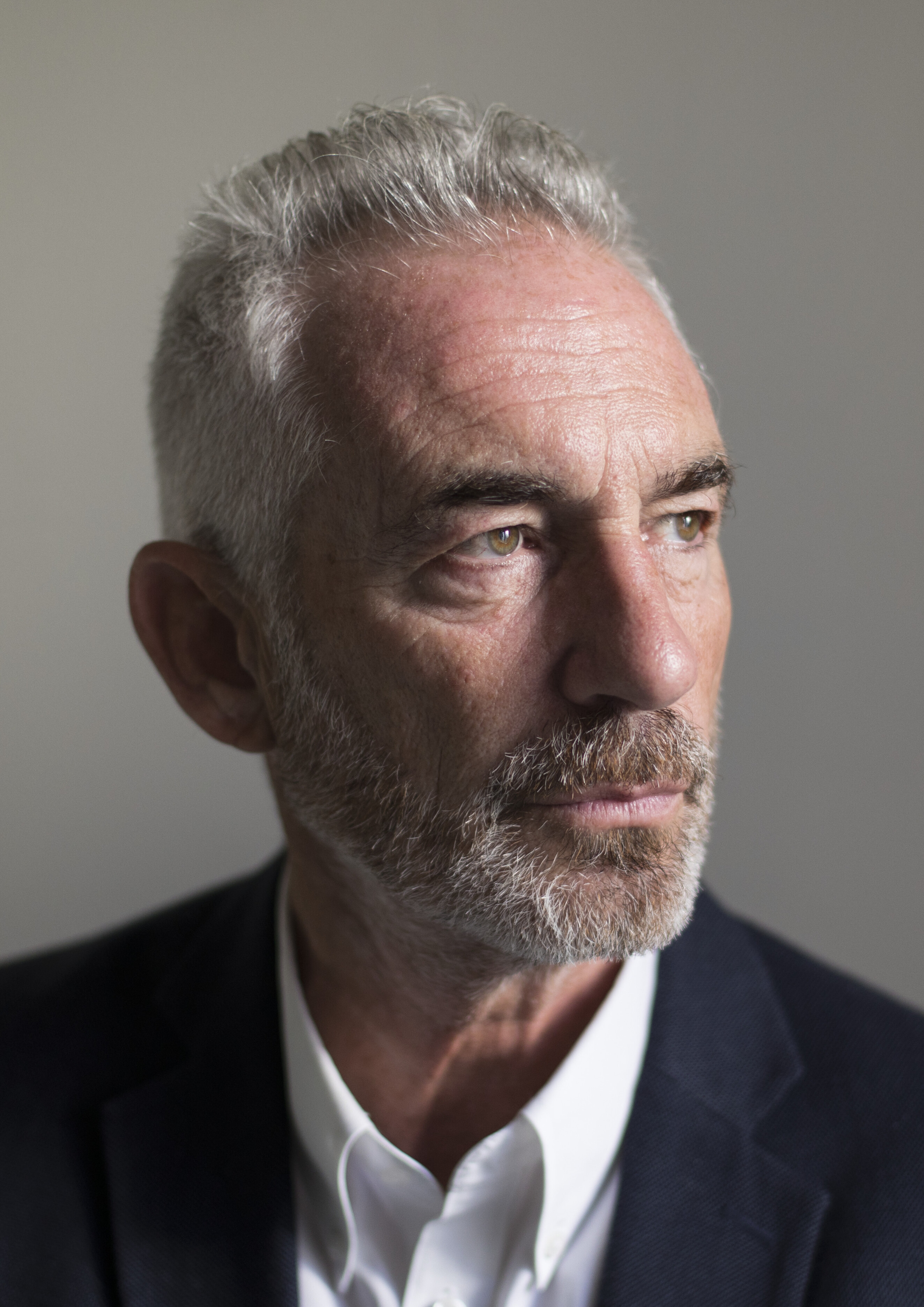
- Jackson in 2018
- Born: 4 June 1957 (age 69)

Academic background
- Education: Christ’s College, Cambridge; University of Western Ontario; University of St Andrews

Academic work
- Sub-discipline: Ecological economics
- Institutions: University of Surrey
- Notable works: Prosperity Without Growth (2009); Material Concerns (1996)
- Website: timjackson.org.uk

Tim Jackson FRSA FAcSS (born 1957) is a British ecological economist and professor of sustainable development at the University of Surrey. He is the director of the Centre for the Understanding of Sustainable Prosperity (CUSP), a multi-disciplinary, international research consortium which aims to understand the economic, social and political dimensions of sustainable prosperity. Tim Jackson is the author of Prosperity Without Growth (2009 and 2017) and Material Concerns (1996). In 2016, he received the Hillary Laureate for exceptional mid-career Leadership. His most recent book The Care Economy was published in May 2025 by Polity Press.

== Work ==
=== Academic work ===
Jackson took his first degree at Christ's College, Cambridge, having joined the college in 1976.

For more than twenty five years, he has worked internationally on sustainable consumption and production. During five years at the Stockholm Environment Institute in the early 1990s, he pioneered the concept of preventative environmental management outlined in his 1996 book Material Concerns – pollution profit and quality of life.

From 1995 to 2000, Jackson held an EPSRC fellowship on the Thermodynamics of Clean Technologies. From 2003 to 2005, he held a Professorial Research Fellowship on the social psychology of sustainable consumption. From 2006 to 2011 Jackson was Director of the ESRC Research group on Lifestyles, Values and Environment. From 2010 to 2014, he was Director of the Sustainable Lifestyles Research Group. From 2013 to 2017, he was ESRC Professioral Research Fellow on Prosperity and Sustainability in the Green Economy. Since 2018 he sits on the advisory board of the ZOE Institute for Future-fit Economies.

Since 2003, his research has focused on consumption, lifestyle and sustainability. In 2005, the Sustainable Development Research Network published his widely cited review Motivating Sustainable Consumption. A respective Earthscan 'Reader' in Sustainable Consumption was issued in 2006. During 2006 and 2007 Tim Jackson was advisor and a regular contributor to BBC Newsnight's Ethical Man series.

In his function as Economics Commissioner on the Sustainable Development Commission, he authored a controversial report, later published by Earthscan/Routledge as Prosperity Without Growth: Economics for a Finite Planet (2009). A substantially revised second edition (Prosperity Without Growth: Foundations for the Economy of Tomorrow) was published in January 2017. By arguing that "prosperity – in any meaningful sense of the word – transcends material concerns", the book summarises the evidence showing that, beyond a certain point, growth does not increase human wellbeing. Prosperity without Growth analyses the complex relationships between growth, environmental crises and social recession. It proposes a route to a sustainable economy, and argues for a redefinition of "prosperity" in light of the evidence on what really contributes to people's wellbeing. In the wake of technological progress and the pursuit of ever-increasing profits, financial growth and its "skewed priorities" are linked to human exploitation and environmental destruction, which Jackson refers to as the "age of irresponsibility". "The clearest message from the financial crisis of 2008 is that our current model of economic success is fundamentally flawed. For the advanced economies of the Western world, prosperity without growth is no longer a utopian dream. It is a financial and ecological necessity."

The book was described by Le Monde as "one of the most outstanding pieces of environmental economics literature in recent years." The sociologist Anthony Giddens referred to it as "a must-read for anyone concerned with issues of climate change and sustainability – bold, original and comprehensive." Prosperity without Growth has been translated into 17 languages including Swedish, German, French, Greek, Spanish, Italian, Dutch, and Chinese.

Tim Jackson was the founder and director of RESOLVE (Research Group on Lifestyles Values and Environment), of its follow-on project: the Defra/ESRC Sustainable Lifestyles Research Group (SLRG), and held an ERSC Professorial Fellowship on Prosperity and Sustainability in the Green Economy (PASSAGE). His current work includes – in collaboration with Peter Victor of York University in Toronto – the development of stock-flow consistent (SFC) macroeconomic simulation models, showing that improved environmental and social outcomes are possible even as the growth rate declines to zero.

=== Playwright ===
In addition to his academic and advisory work, Jackson is a playwright with numerous BBC Radio writing credits to his name. His 30 episode environmental drama series Cry of the Bittern won a 1997 Public Awareness of Science (PAWS) Drama Award. The Language of Flowers, a drama documentary about the life and work of the 18th-century poet Christopher Smart, won the 2004 Prix Marulić. Jackson's most recent play, Variations, written around a Beethoven sonata of the same name, won the 2007 Grand Prix Marulić and was longlisted for the 2008 Sony awards.

== Publications ==
- The Care Economy. Cambridge: Polity Press. May 2025.
- Post Growth—Life after capitalism. Cambridge: Polity Press. March 2021.
- The Transition to a Sustainable Prosperity-A Stock-Flow-Consistent Ecological Macroeconomic Model for Canada. Tim Jackson and Peter Victor. Ecological Economics, Vol 177.
- Wellbeing Matters—Tackling growth dependency. A Policy Briefing for the All-Party Parliamentary Group on Limits to Growth. Tim Jackson, February 2020.
- The Transition to a Sustainable Prosperity—A Stock-Flow-Consistent Ecological Macroeconomic Model for Canada. Tim Jackson and Peter Victor. In Ecological Economics, July 2020.
- The Post-Growth Challenge — Secular Stagnation, Inequality and the Limits to Growth. Tim Jackson, CUSP Working Paper No 12. Guildford: University of Surrey. May 2018.
- Confronting inequality in a post-growth world – basic income, factor substitution and the future of work. Tim Jackson, and Peter Victor. CUSP Working Paper No 11. Guildford: University of Surrey. April 2018.
- Does slow growth increase inequality? Some reflections on Piketty’s ‘fundamental’ laws of capitalism, Tim Jackson and Peter Victor, PASSAGE Working Paper 14-01, Guildford: University of Surrey, August 2014
- Green economy at community scale, Tim Jackson and Peter Victor, Metcalf Foundation: Toronto, November 2013
- Developing an Ecological Macroeconomics, Tim Jackson and Peter Victor, Centre for International Governance Innovation, cigionline.org, 11 September 2013
- Angst essen Seele auf – Escaping the 'iron cage' of consumerism, Tim Jackson, Wuppertal Spezial (Vol 48), Wuppertal Institute for Climate, Environment and Energy
- Consumerism as Theodicy – an exploration of religions and secular meaning functions (with M. Pepper). In Thomas, L (ed): Consuming Paradise. Oxford: Palgrave-Macmillan, 2010.
- New economic model needed not relentless consumer demand, Tim Jackson for The Guardian Blog, 17 January 2013
- The Cinderella economy: an answer to unsustainable growth?, Tim Jackson for The Ecologist, 27 July 2012
- Let's be less productive, Tim Jackson for The New York Times, 26 May 2012
- Dismount and die? The paradox of sustainable living, Tim Jackson for The Guardian, 29 June 2011
- Prosperity Without Growth: Economics for a Finite Planet. London and New York: Earthscan/Routledge, 2009.
  - Second edition with the title Prosperity Without Growth: Foundations for the Economy of Tomorrow in 2017.
- The Earthscan Reader on Sustainable Consumption. London and New York: Earthscan/Routledge, 2006
- Material concerns: pollution, profit, and quality of life. SEI, Stockholm Environment Institute; London, New York: Routledge, 1996.

== Politics ==
Prior to the 2015 general election, he was one of several celebrities who endorsed the parliamentary candidacy of the Green Party's Caroline Lucas. He was Economics Commissioner on the UK's Sustainable Development Commission set up by the Labour Government under Gordon Brown in June 2000 and closed by the Coalition Government in March 2011.

== See also ==
- Degrowth
- Post-growth
