= Post-growth =

Beyond optimum economic growth

Post-growth is an umbrella term that refers to a broad family of economic, ecological, and political perspectives responding to the limits-to-growth dilemma—the recognition that infinite economic growth is biophysically unsustainable on a finite planet. Central to post-growth thinking is the shift of the focus out of GDP growth as the main goal of the economy. Instead, well-being becomes the main objective. Post-growth puts emphasis on decoupling societal well-being from economic growth, advocating for the possibility of prosperity beyond growth.

Scholars define post-growth in different ways. Some describe it as comprising two main categories: degrowth (a stance advocating for a deliberate and equitable reduction in material consumption and economic activity) and agrowth (an agnostic stance towards economic growth, holding that policymakers should remain neutral about GDP growth because it may have either positive or negative effects on environmental or social objectives). According to others it serves as an umbrella term encompassing research in Doughnut and wellbeing economics, steady-state economics, and degrowth.

A systematic review of academic literature found that the distinction between degrowth and post-growth is often unclear, with many authors using post-growth as a catch-all term to avoid the strong connotations associated with degrowth.

== Post-growth proposals ==
German economist Niko Paech, professor at the University of Oldenburg, has argued for reducing economic output and promoting self-sufficiency and regional exchange. In his book Liberation from Affluence, he proposes measures such as a 20-hour working week, the use of regional currencies, and halting large-scale infrastructure projects including motorways and airports.

In his work Prosperity Without Growth (Routledge, 2017), the economist Tim Jackson demonstrates that building a 'post-growth' economy is a "precise, definable and meaningful task". Starting from clear first principles, he sets out the dimensions of that task: the nature of enterprise; the quality of our working lives; the structure of investment; and the role of the money supply.

Paradigmatic post-growth policies are working time reductions, universal basic income, wealth taxes, carbon taxes combined with strong wealth redistribution and universal basic services.

== Academic reviews ==
A 2024 systematic review of academic literature concluded a number of studies use the term post-growth to express views associated with degrowth, and some leading degrowth scholars have employed it in their own work (e.g., Hickel et al., 2021). While post-growth generally refers to prioritising sustainability and social justice over economic growth, degrowth goes further by advocating a deliberate reduction in the scale of economic activity to achieve these aims. In recent years, the distinction between the two terms has become less clear, with many authors on degrowth using the catch-term post-growth, possibly to avoid resistance against the strong connotation of degrowth.

A 2025 review in The Lancet Planetary Health surveyed 201 recent studies to assess the field of post-growth research. The authors highlighted advances in ecological macroeconomic models, including testing post-growth policies, addressing GDP-linked welfare dependencies, and identifying systems to reduce resource use while enhancing wellbeing. The review is authored by leading experts across multiple subfields of post-growth research and highlights key recent contributions without adhering to traditional systematic review criteria, such as requiring explicit use of 'post-growth' terminology. According to the review, ecological macroeconomic models used in post-growth research could be enhanced in four main respects: by including a broader set of environmental and wellbeing indicators; by adapting and calibrating them for geographic and economic contexts beyond Europe and North America; by incorporating international dimensions such as trade, capital flows, and currency movements; and by extending the approach to global climate–economy models. The authors also note that while structural factors may make a post-growth transition politically challenging, relatively little attention has been given to its geopolitical dimensions, including potential risks for early-adopting countries such as capital flight or loss of geopolitical influence. They further identify a gap in knowledge about the political pathways that could make post-growth transitions feasible, especially in terms of how shifts in international governance and global power structures might create or restrict opportunities for post-growth and sovereign development.

== Public and expert opinion ==
A 2023 study of nearly 800 climate policy researchers around the world found that 73% support post-growth (45% agrowth and 28% degrowth). A pan-European survey reported that 61% of respondents favor post-growth approaches. In a representative survey of Spanish citizens, Drews and van den Bergh (2016) found that a majority regarded economic growth and environmental sustainability as compatible (green growth), about one-third preferred either disregarding economic growth as a policy goal (agrowth) or halting it altogether (degrowth).

== See also ==
- Agrowth
- Club of Rome
- Deep ecology
- Degrowth
- Ecological economics
- Genuine progress indicator
- Happiness economics
- Humanistic economics
- The Limits to Growth
- Participatory economics
- Political ecology
- Post-consumerism
- Power Down: Options and Actions for a Post-Carbon World
- Prosperity Without Growth
- Slow Movement
- Steady-state economy
- The Path to Degrowth in Overdeveloped Countries
- Tim Jackson (economist)
- Traditional trades
- Uneconomic growth
- Universal Basic Income
