= Sustainable Development Commission =

Ex-UK government advisory organization

- Logo
- Formation: June 2001
- Type: Non-departmental public body
- Legal status: Closed as of 30 March 2011
- Purpose: Independent adviser on sustainable development
- Location: London, Edinburgh, Cardiff, Belfast
- Region served: United Kingdom
- Official language: English, Welsh
- Website: www.sd-commission.org.uk

The Sustainable Development Commission (SDC) was a non-departmental public body responsible for advising the UK Government, Scottish Government, Welsh Assembly Government, and Northern Ireland Executive on sustainable development.

It was set up by the Labour Government in June 2000 and closed by the Coalition Government in March 2011.

== Establishment ==
In 1999 the Labour Government made the policy case for sustainable development in a White paper entitled A better quality of life.

Pressure then came to oversee the Government's progress and develop policy on sustainable development, including from Michael Meacher MP.

Subsequently, the Sustainable Development Commission was founded by Deputy Prime Minister John Prescott in June 2000. It replaced the UK Round Table on Sustainable Development, a stakeholder body, and the British Government Panel on Sustainable Development, a Government think tank.

== Leadership and purpose ==
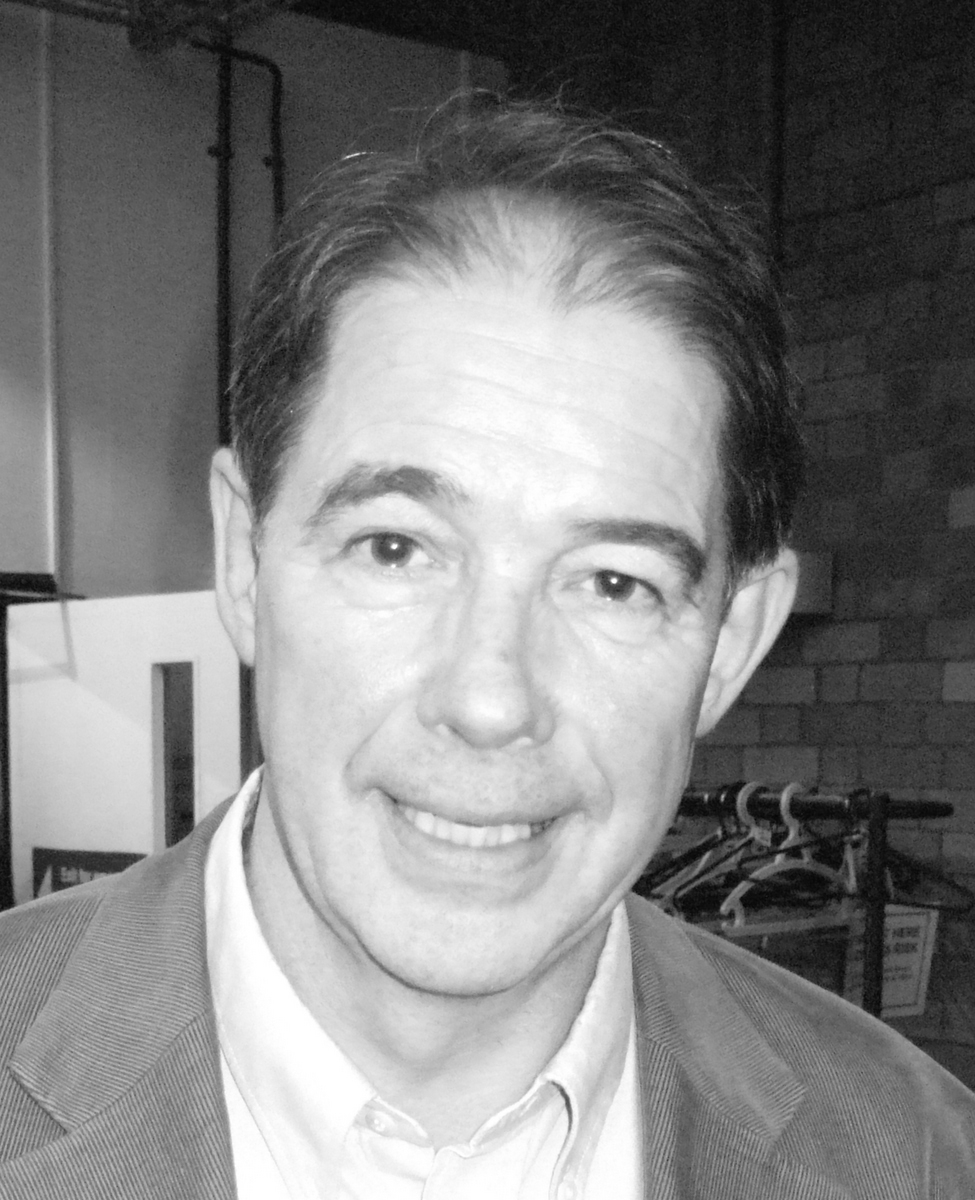
Sustainable Development Commission Chair 2000–2009, Jonathon Porritt

The commission reported directly to the prime minister of the United Kingdom (UK Government), the First Minister of Scotland (Scottish Government), First Minister for Wales (Welsh Assembly Government), and the First Minister and deputy First Minister of Northern Ireland (Northern Ireland Executive).

Its responsibilities to the four bodies were broadly similar: it was an official watchdog on sustainability; it scrutinised progress on meeting targets on the sustainable management of the bodies' estates and procurement; and it provided cross-departmental policy advice and assistance.

From 2000 to 2009 the Commission was chaired by the former Director of Friends of the Earth, Jonathan Porritt, and between 2009 and its closure in 2011, it was chaired by Will Day formerly of Comic Relief and the United Nations Development Programme. The vice-chair from 2004 to 2011 was Rebecca Willis, a researcher on environment and sustainability practice.

It produced reports such as Prosperity Without Growth by Prof Tim Jackson in 2009.

== Closure and succession ==
On 22 July 2010, the Department for Environment, Food and Rural Affairs announced that it would stop funding the Commission. The decision was part of the Coalition Government's quango reforms, termed by the media as a "bonfire of the quangos" Jonathan Porritt described the decision an "act of ideological vandalism".

This news was criticised by Green Caroline Lucas MP, Guardian journalist and activist George Monbiot, Daily Telegraph journalist Geoffrey Lean, and Friends of the Earth. They claimed the Commission was necessary for the Government to fulfil its ambition to be the "greenest government ever".

The Chair of the Environmental Audit Select Committee, Labour MP Joan Walley, also criticised the decision to close the Commission. She led efforts to ensure the Commission's role had a successor, and in January 2011 the Environmental Audit Select Committee recommended the creation of a new Minister for Sustainable Development.

== See also ==
- A Green New Deal
- Sustainable development
- Environmental Audit Select Committee
- Department for Environment, Food and Rural Affairs
- Department for Energy and Climate Change
- Scottish Government Environment Directorates
- Welsh Assembly Government
- Department of the Environment (Northern Ireland)
- 2010 UK quango reforms
