= List of awards and honors received by Edward Snowden =

Accolades of American whistleblower

Edward Snowden
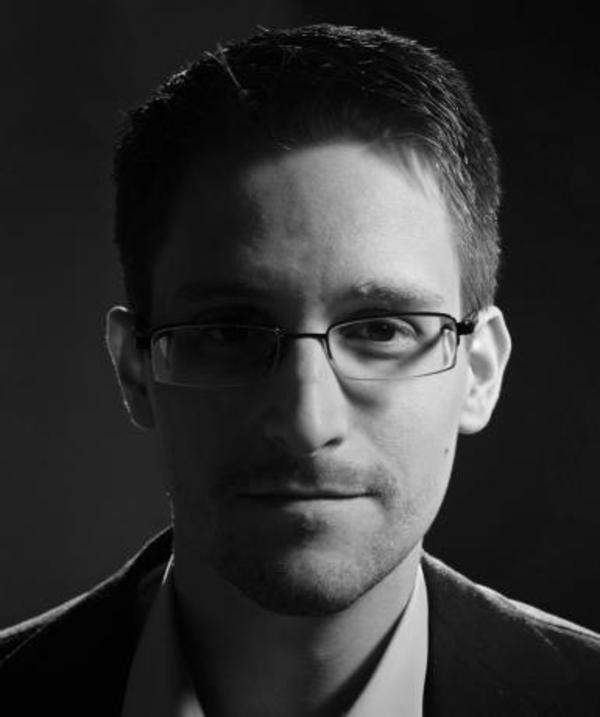
- In 2014, Snowden joined the board of Freedom of the Press Foundation, which published this photo.

The awards received by Edward Snowden are part of the reactions to global surveillance disclosures made by Edward Snowden. A subject of controversy, Snowden has been variously called a hero, a whistleblower, a dissident, a patriot, and a traitor. He has been honored by publications and organizations based in Europe and the United States.

== Recognition ==
Edward Snowden was voted as The Guardian's person of the year 2013, garnering four times the number of votes than any other candidate.

The 2013 list of leading Global Thinkers, published annually by Foreign Policy placed Snowden in first place due to the impact of his revelations. FP's "Global Conversation visualization" showed that Snowden "occupied a role in 2013's global news media coverage just slightly less important than President Barack Obama himself."

Snowden headed TechRepublic's Ten Tech Heroes of 2013. Editor Jack Wallen noted that besides raising public awareness of surveillance and government secrecy, Snowden's leaks were significant for technology professionals.

Snowden was named Time′s Person of the Year runner-up in 2013, behind Pope Francis. Time was criticized for not placing him in the top spot. In 2014, Snowden was named among Time's 100 Most Influential People in the world.

In February 2014, Snowden joined the board of directors of the Freedom of the Press Foundation, co-founded by Pentagon Papers leaker Daniel Ellsberg. Journalists Glenn Greenwald and Laura Poitras also sit on the board.

In July 2014, Freie Universität Berlin announced that Snowden had accepted its offer of honorary membership in recognition of what the university called "his extraordinary achievements in defense of transparency, justice, and freedom." Apart from the honor, there are no rights, privileges or duties involved.

In 2020 the Center for Independent Thought announced that Snowden had received the Thomas S. Szasz Award for Outstanding Contributions to the Cause of Civil Liberties, Lifetime Achievement Award.

== German Whistleblower Prize ==
Edward Snowden was awarded the biennial German Whistleblower Prize in August 2013, in absentia, with an accompanying award equal to €3,000. Established in 1999, the award is sponsored by the German branch of the International Association of Lawyers Against Nuclear Arms and by the Federation of German Scientists. Organizers in Berlin said the prize was to acknowledge his "bold efforts to expose the massive and unsuspecting monitoring and storage of communication data, which cannot be accepted in democratic societies."

== Sam Adams Award ==
Edward Snowden speaks about various topics at the Sam Adams Award presentation in Moscow.

In October 2013, the Sam Adams Award was presented to Snowden in Moscow by a group of four visiting American former intelligence officers and whistleblowers. After two months as an asylee, Snowden made his first public appearance to accept the award, a candlestick holder meant to symbolize bringing light to dark corners. During their visit, one of the presenters—FBI whistleblower Jesselyn Radack of the Government Accountability Project—became Snowden's lawyer. A week later, Radack wrote in The Nation that Snowden exemplified Sam Adams's "courage, persistence and devotion to truth—no matter what the consequences."

== Alternative Christmas Message ==
Snowden was chosen to give Britain's 2013 "Alternative Christmas Message", Channel 4's non-establishment parallel to the Royal Christmas Message by Queen Elizabeth II. In a short piece filmed by Laura Poitras, Snowden spoke about government surveillance in terms of George Orwell's classic novel Nineteen Eighty-Four – arguing that modern surveillance capabilities far surpass those imagined for Big Brother.

== Rector of the University of Glasgow ==
In February 2014, Snowden was elected Rector of the University of Glasgow, a ceremonial post of student body representative chosen by the students themselves. He won the historic office by a wide margin of votes, even though his nomination, like those of several other past Rectors, was a purely symbolic gesture. He served his three-year term in absentia.

== German Big Brother Award ==
At the German Big Brother Awards gala on April 11, 2014, Edward Snowden was honored with the first-ever Julia and Winston Award (positive award), named after the two main rebellious characters in Orwell's Nineteen Eighty-Four. The award was endowed with one million stickers calling on the German government to grant asylum to Snowden. The award's organizers, Digitalcourage, made the stickers available free online for the public to distribute throughout Germany.

== Ridenhour Truth-Telling Prize ==
In April 2014, Snowden and Laura Poitras were awarded the Ridenhour Truth-Telling Prize, given by The Nation Institute and The Fertel Foundation for transparency and whistleblowing. Snowden and Poitras each appeared on video at the National Press Club to accept the award. Snowden gave a speech and took questions from the audience, who accorded him several standing ovations. During his speech, he questioned why he had been so swiftly charged with crimes whereas Director of National Intelligence James Clapper was not even reprimanded for his "famous lie" to Congress.

== Right Livelihood Award ==
In December 2014, Snowden shared a Joint Honorary Award with Alan Rusbridger, editor of The Guardian, from the Swedish Right Livelihood Award Foundation.

== Carl von Ossietzky Medal ==
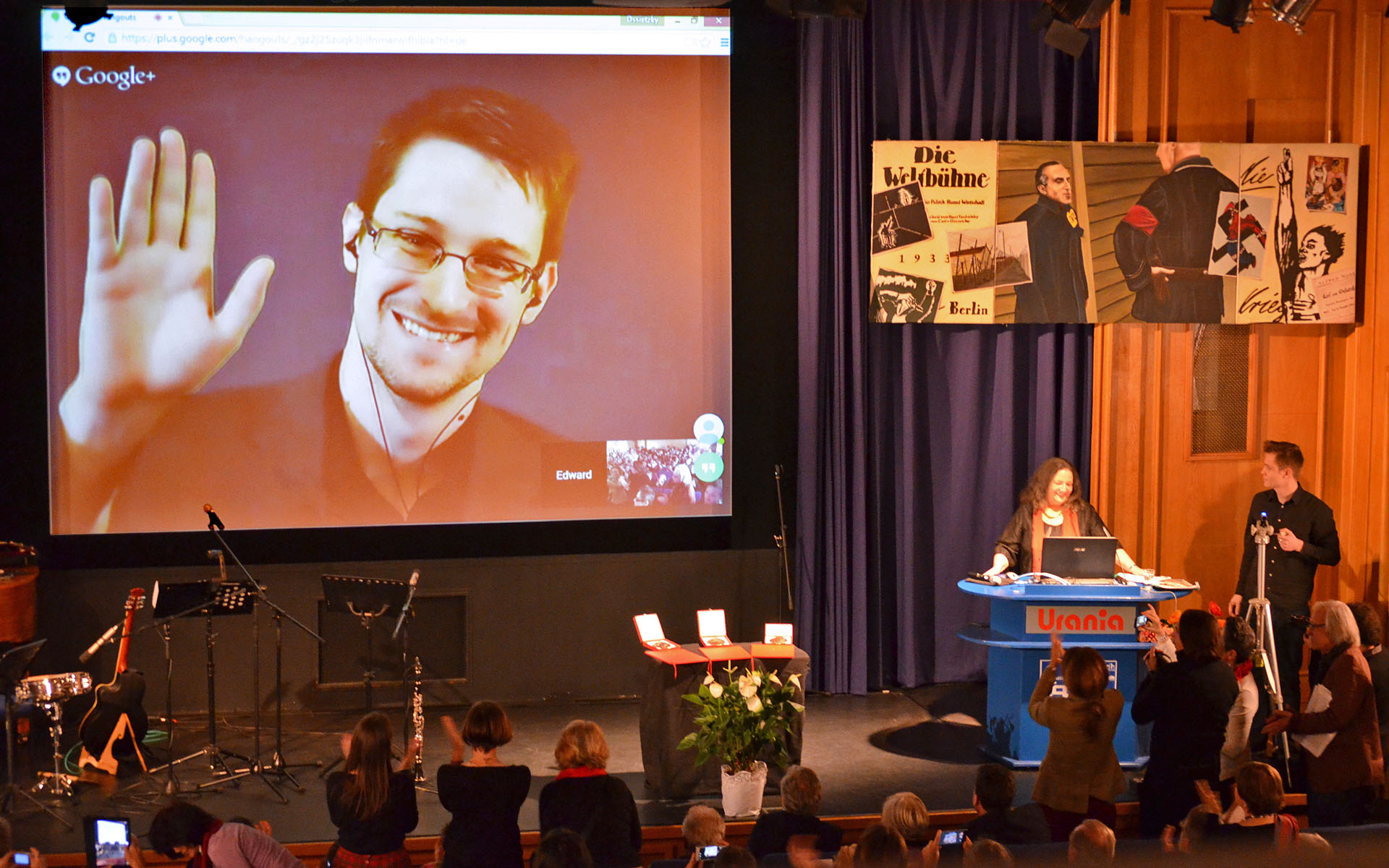
Snowden appears via video at the International League for Human Rights 2014 awards ceremony

Also in December 2014, Snowden shared the International League for Human Rights (Berlin) annual Carl von Ossietzky Medal with journalists Glenn Greenwald and Laura Poitras.

== IQ Award ==
In 2014, Snowden was nominated for the IQ Award by members of the non-profit organization Mensa Germany. Although the official IQ Award commission confirmed his nomination, the managing board of Mensa threatened the commission to subdue Snowden's nomination, and in doing so, they violated the Mensa bylaws. The German Mensa board did this also in reaction to talks with Mensa International. Consequently, it was not possible for Mensa members to vote for Snowden. This caused big controversies among the Mensa members, leading to the effect that opposing Mensa members agreed to all vote in protest for actor Jonny Lee Miller as the most nonsensical nominee, who thus won the election.

== Norsk PEN Ossietzky Prize ==
In 2016, the Norwegian chapter of PEN International awarded Snowden the Ossietzky Prize given "For outstanding achievements within the field of freedom of expression". Snowden applied to Norway for safe passage to pick up the prize, but the courts said they were unable to legally rule on anything because Snowden was not in the country and they had not received a formal extradition request.

Academic offices
Preceded by Charles Kennedy	Rector of the University of Glasgow; 2014–2017	Next: Aamer Anwar
