= Radack =

Radack is a surname. Notable people with the surname include:

- Daniel Radack (fl. early 21st century), American engineer
- Jesselyn Radack (born 1970), American attorney

== See also ==
- Radach
