= Paech =

Paech is a surname. Notable people with the surname include:

- Carlo Paech (born 1992), German pole vaulter
- Chansey Paech (born 1987), Australian politician
- Friedrich Wilhelm Paech (1861–1908), Australian politician
- Niko Paech (born 1960), German economist
- Norman Paech (born 1938), German professor

== See also ==
- 9700 Paech, a minor planet
