= Scharhorn =

Scharhorn may refer to:

- Scharhörn, a small island in the Heligoland Bight near Cuxhaven, Germany
- Schärhorn, a mountain in the Glarus Alps near Klausen Pass, Switzerland

== See also ==
- Gerhard Scherhorn (1930–2018), German economist
- Operation Scherhorn, World War II intelligence operation by the USSR
