= Scherhorn =

Scherhorn may refer to:

- Gerhard Scherhorn (1930–2018), German professor and economist
- Operation Scherhorn, World War II intelligence operation by the USSR

== See also ==
- Scharhörn, a small island in the Heligoland Bight near Cuxhaven, Germany
- Schärhorn, a mountain in the Glarus Alps near Klausen Pass, Switzerland
