= Vereinigung für Ökologische Ökonomie =

German scientific society

Vereinigung für Ökologische Ökonomie (VÖÖ) is a German scientific society promoting ecological principles in the global economy.

== History and background ==
In 1992, the economist Christiane Busch-Lüty and the physicist Hans-Peter Dürr gave a joint talk at a conference of Verein für Socialpolitik (VfS) on the topic of “economics and nature”. During the discussion, it turned out that the point of view presented had no backing among the attendees of VfS, and Busch-Lüty and colleagues decided to establish an independent society. Busch-Lüty initiated in 1996 the establishment of VÖÖ as part of a small, interdisciplinary group of scientists as a German-speaking section of International Society for Ecological Economics (ISEE). The local mayor and former Member of the European Parliament Beate Weber-Schuerholz acted as a patron of the constitutive conference in April 1996 in Heidelberg. The 50 scientists present shared the belief that the calls of Rio Earth Summit 1992 for establishing a sustainable development are legitimate and need to be realized. Based on the insight that economic growth would be the wrong answer to persistent ecological problems, the scientists wanted to act strategically to alter the academic landscape.

== Positions ==
The society argues that the economic sciences are overcharged with the necessary transformation and claims, that other scientific fields, politics open to change and the cultural forces of the society as a whole are necessary to implement and shape the change assumed necessary. Since the beginning, VÖÖ emphasized the necessity of a transdisciplinary approach. Until 2010, VÖÖ was involved with establishing the concept of sustainability in its ecological, social and economic perspective. Following a reorientation in 2010, the society promotes a post-growth economy based on the concepts of Niko Paech and others. The concept of sustainable growth is considered to be an oxymoron, and the importance of eco-efficiency, consistency and eco-sufficiency is emphasized.

== Activities ==
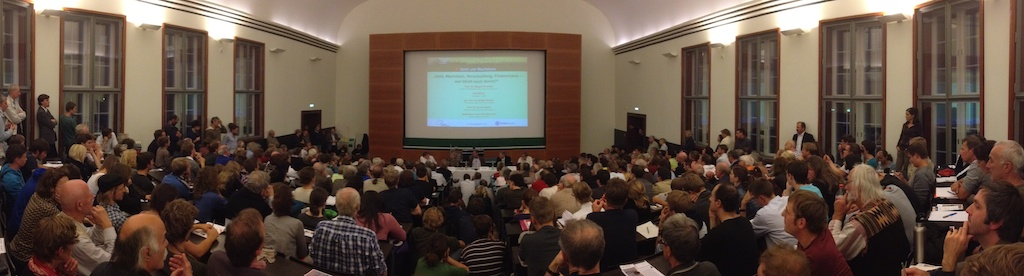
Panel discussion at annual conference 2012

VÖÖ is working in research groups and organizes annual conferences, workshops and releases publications such as a series of discussion papers and books. From October 2010 on, VÖÖ supports students and practitioners via the Netzwerk Wachstumswende.

The current presidents are André Reichel and Erik Wolf, former presidents include Dirk Löhr, Susanne Hartard, Eva Lang, Gerhard Oesten, Niko Paech and Gerhard Scherhorn. Well known members are Adelheid Biesecker, Peter Finke, Niko Paech, and Beate Weber-Schuerholz. Hans-Peter Dürr, Hans Christoph Binswanger, and Gerhard Scherhorn were founder members. Christiane Busch-Lüty who deceased November 2010 was honorary chairwoman of the society.

== Research prizes ==
Between 1998 and 2002, VÖÖ granted together with Schweisfurth-Stiftung the biennial Schweisfurth-Forschungspreis für Ökologische Ökonomie, a research prize for contributions in the field of ecological economics. Laureates were Christa Müller, Ralf Weiß, Sigrid Stagl, Daniel Dahm and Stefanie Böge. Since 2004, VÖÖ grants together with several charitable foundations the biennial Kapp-Forschungspreis für Ökologische Ökonomie im remembrance of Karl William Kapp. Laureates were Michael Flitner and Dagmar Vinz (2004), Niko Paech and Bianca Borowski (2006), Fabian Scholtes and Eva Koch (2008), Lasse Loft and Oliver Stengel (2010), Gerolf Hanke and Anja Humburg (2012), Matthias Schmelzer, Corinna Burkhart and Dirk Posse (2014), Lorenz Stör, Christian Arndt and Johannes Buhl (2016) as well as Steffen Lange, Barbara Plank and Marius Rommel. Since 2013, VÖÖ grants in remembrance of its honorary chairwoman the Christiane Busch-Lüty Förderpreis für Ökologische Ökonomie. Laureates were the sociologist Daniela Gottschlich (2013) and Tilman Santarius (2015).

== Literature ==
- Vereinigung für Ökologische Ökonomie e.V.; Irmi Seidl, eds. (1999), Ökologische Ökonomie: Ansätze zur Positionsbestimmung der Vereinigung für Ökologische Ökonomie (in German). Online access.
- Eva Lang; Christiane Busch-Lüty; Jürgen Kopfmüller, eds. (2007), Wiedervorlage dringend: Ansätze für eine Ökonomie der Nachhaltigkeit (in German), München: oekom, ISBN 978-3-86581-070-0
