= Brandon Bryant (whistleblower) =

American whistleblower

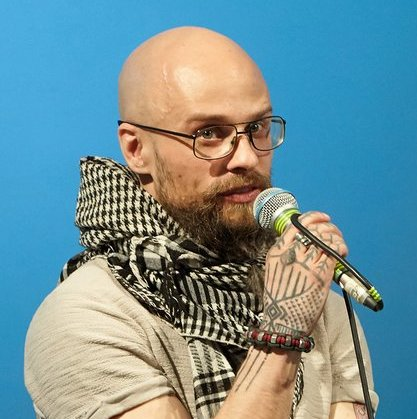
Brandon Bryant speaking at the Disruption Network Lab in 2022

Brandon Wayne Bryant (born November 18, 1985, in Missoula, Montana) is an American whistleblower. From 2006 to 2011 he was a camera operator (sensor operator) of unmanned drones of the United States Air Force. His job was targeted killing.

On December 10, 2012, the German magazine Der Spiegel reported about Bryant, his former work and his post traumatic stress disorder.

He gave his testimony to an expert council of the United Nations and to the German Parliamentary Committee investigating the NSA spying scandal. Jesselyn Radack is his lawyer.

The smoke clears, and there’s pieces of the two guys around the crater. And there’s this guy over here, and he’s missing his right leg above his knee. He’s holding it, and he’s rolling around, and the blood is squirting out of his leg … It took him a long time to die. I just watched him.

— Airman First Class Brandon Bryant in GQ

In April 2015 Brandon Bryant gave his first public keynote 'Inside the Predator' on the drone-system and his experience as a drone operator at the conference 'DRONES: Eyes from a Distance', the opening event of the Disruption Network Lab in Berlin, Germany.

In 2015 the Vereinigung Deutscher Wissenschaftler and the German section of the International Association of Lawyers against Nuclear Arms awarded Bryant with the Whistleblower Award.

In November 2015 the theatrical play Ramstein Airbase: Game of Drones premiered at Staatstheater Mainz. Brandon Bryant is a central character and was played by Denis Larisch.

In May 2016 the Norwegian documentary filmer Tonje Hessen Schei produced the documentary Drone – This Is No Game!. Drone pilots Brandon Bryant and Michael Haas are shown as examples of how the CIA recruits video gamers and trains them to kill by remote control. An earlier version of the film won awards at several festivals in 2015. At the Bergen International Film Festival it won the "Best Documentary Award“ and the "Human Rights Award“. At the Cinema for Peace Foundation in Berlin it won the award as "Most Valuable Documentary of the Year“. At the San Sebastian Human Rights Film Festival the team that made the documentary won the "Amnesty International Award“.
