= Karl William Kapp =

German-American economist (1910–1976)

- Born: October 27, 1910; Königsberg, East Prussia, Imperial Germany
- Died: April 4, 1976 (aged 65); Dubrovnik, Yugoslavia

Academic work
- Discipline: Evolutionary economics, institutional economics
- School or tradition: Institutional economics

Karl William Kapp (October 27, 1910 – April 4, 1976) was a German-American economist and professor of economics at the City University of New York and later the University of Basel. Kapp's main contribution was the development of a theory of social costs that captures urgent socio-ecological problems and proposes preventative policies based on the precautionary principle. His theory is in the tradition of various heterodox economic paradigms, such as ecological economics, Marxian economics, social economics, and institutional economics. As such, Kapp's theory of social costs was an ongoing debate with neoclassical economics and the rise of neoliberalism. He was an opponent of the compartmentalisation of knowledge and championed, instead, the integration and humanization of the social sciences. He is regarded as a foundational thinker in the development of social ecological economics.

== Biography ==
Kapp was born in Königsberg in 1910 as son of August Wilhelm Kapp, who was a teacher of physics. In secondary school at the Hufengymnasium one of his teachers was the poet Ernst Wiechert End 1920s he started studying law and economics at the universities in Berlin and Königsberg. He continued his studies in London and at the Geneva Graduate Institute in Switzerland, where in 1936 he received a Ph.D. in economics with his dissertation "Planwirtschaft und Aussenhandel".

In Geneva Kapp had met the people of the Frankfurt School, who emigrated to the US and settled as Institute for Social Research at the Columbia University, New York City. In 1937 they granted Kapp a scholarship. From 1938 to 1945 he was an instructor in economics at the New York University and Columbia University in New York. From 1945 to 1950 he was assistant professor of economics at the Wesleyan University in Middleton, Connecticut.

From 1950 to 1965 he was a professor of economics at the University of the City of New York. He was among the first members of the Association for Evolutionary Economics (AFEE). In 1965 he returned to Switzerland and was professor of economics at the University of Basel until 1976. In that time he was also a visiting professor at the Ecole Pratique des Hautes Etudes, Sorbonne, Paris.

In 1976, Kapp had a fatal heart attack during a conference in Dubrovnik, Croatia.

== Work ==
Kapp's research interests ranged from economics, sociology, policy making and environmental science to the theory of knowledge, the history of economic thought, and many related topics.

=== Planning debate ===
In his 1936 dissertation Planwirtschaft und Aussenhandel contributed to the debate around the economic calculation problem, a criticism of central economic planning. This problem was first proposed by Ludwig von Mises in 1920, expounded by Friedrich Hayek and further debated in the 1920s and 1930s. Kapp argued that a planned economy is "not doomed to autarky because there are ways to deal with the valuation problem so that trade and exchange with market economies can be organized".

== Publications ==
- 1936, Planwirtschaft und Außenhandel, Genève : Georg & Cie.
- 1950, The Social Costs of Private Enterprise, Cambridge, Mass. : Harvard Univ. Press
- 1963, The Social Costs of Business Enterprise
- 1961, Towards a Science of Man in Society – A Positive Approach towards the Integration of Social Knowledge
- 1958, Volkswirtschaftliche Kosten der Privatwirtschaft. Tübingen: Mohr (Siebeck).
- 1975, Neue Wege für Bangladesh. Hamburg : Inst. f. Asienkunde
- 1976, Staatliche Förderung "umweltfreundlicher" Technologien. Göttingen: Schwartz.
- 2011, The Foundations of Institutional Economics – by K. William Kapp, edited by Sebastian Berger and Rolf Steppacher. Routledge.

== See also ==
- European Association for Evolutionary and Political Economy
- Non-equilibrium economics
- Vereinigung für Ökologische Ökonomie, that grants a research prize in remembrance of Kapp
