= Potsdam Denkschrift =

Political manifesto

The Potsdam Denkschrift is a declaration of Hans-Peter Dürr, J. Daniel Dahm and Rudolf zur Lippe under the patronage of the Federation of German Scientists-VDW. It is the base – the “mother” of the abstract condensed version, the Potsdam Manifesto ‚We have to learn to think in a new way’ what was up to now signed by more than 130 scientists and personalities from all over the world. Both were presented to the public in Berlin in autumn 2005.

The collapse of a course of action legitimised by the materialistic-deterministic world view of the classical physics is elucidated in several chapters. The "progressing uniformity of all ideas of value and affluence, habits of consumption and economic strategies on the pattern of a Western/American/European knowledge society" (Potsdam Manifesto & Potsdam Denkschrift) and its hazards is accentuated and a rethinking towards a more holistic view and behaviour is claimed.

Creativity, differentiation and connectedness are basic characteristics of life. The future is essentially open.

== Process ==
For the initiation, scientific feedbacking in content and composition and for the multiplication of Potsdam Denkschrift & Potsdam Manifesto an intensive international scientific discourse was carried out since beginning of the Einstein-Year 2005.

An interdisciplinary symposium in Potsdam to discuss a first draft of the “Denkschrift” (therefore Potsdam Denkschrift & Potsdam Manifesto) was carried out in June 2005. The resultant development of the critical and bracing symposium was the full backing of all participants, as well as the decision to publish a short Manifesto additionally to the “Denkschrift”.

On October 14, 2005 both - the short Potsdam Manifesto 2005 "We have to learn to think in a new way" and the more explicit Potsdam Denkschrift 2005 - were presented to the public in Berlin.

In the following months various international signees of the Potsdam Manifesto were contacted and successfully mobilized as supporters.

== Background ==
Denkschrift and Manifesto connect to a central but not expanded appeal of the Russell–Einstein Manifesto of Bertrand Russell and Albert Einstein, published on the 9th of July 1955 in London: "We have to learn to think in a new way". The Russell–Einstein Manifesto was an ultimate calling for a new way of thinking that would guarantee war, in the future, to be completely banned as an instrument of politics and conflict resolution.

== Starting situation ==
Following the basic ideas of Potsdam Denkschrift & Potsdam Manifesto the global situation at the beginning of the 21st century, 50 years after the Russell–Einstein Manifesto, confronts the humankind in an even more dangerous and more complex form.

"Our deep worry that we, as members of the species homo sapiens, are increasingly reducing the living diversity of our earth and of our creative developmental possibilities, thus irreversibly endangering our survival in peace and our mutual exchange gives us the courage, and our awareness that we have to take new paths gives us the occasion, to compose this manifesto." (Potsdam Manifesto & Potsdam Denkschrift)

In this spirit it is not adequate just to answer - to give symptom remedies - to the diverse and escalating endangerments for humankind and more over for its carrying biosphere.

It is urgent to detect the deeper causes covert behind these various crises syndromes. They have to be searched in the grave failures of the dominant strategies in our thinking and actions. It is obviously that the existence threatening problems of humankind are human-made too.

== Re-orientations for Sustainable Development ==
In accordance Potsdam Denkschrift & Potsdam Manifesto enquire for the deeper sub-structures of the diverse crises symptoms. They show radical and deep going re-orientations for the sustainable development of humankind and for our thinking.

"This wide variety of crises today confronting us and threatening to exceed our ability to cope are the expression of a mental crisis in the relation between us humans and our living world. They are symptoms of deeper causes that we have thus far neglected to seek and reveal. They are closely connected with the materialistic-mechanistic worldview favored all over the world today and with its prior history." (Potsdam Manifesto & Potsdam Denkschrift)

Potsdam Denkschrift & Potsdam Manifesto charge a unidirectional narrow-minded western-European-North American modelled way of thinking to stall the living co-action between humans and creatures and to hinder their viability via centralisation trends and averaging of living complexes from biosphere to anthroposphere.

== Bridging Quantum Physics, Ecology and Philosophy ==
Via the linking up between quantum physics, ecology and philosophy Potsdam Denkschrift & Potsdam Manifesto are highlighting plurality, diversity and alteration as genuine in a living cosmos, as fundamental for a concerted evolution.

The idea of a separated, fragmented reality dissolves in the micro physics and dynamically transforming and differentiating relations are taking the place of substantial segregations. The image of a world assembled from dead matter is superseded by a cosmology, what is based on an immaterial omni-connectedness and what is inherently “alive”.

"Instead of the world assumed until now – a mechanical, temporally determined “reality” of objectifiable things, the real “Wirklichkeit” (a world that effects) turns out to be basically “potentiality”: an indivisible, immaterial, temporally essentially indeterminate and genuinely creative bonding of relations that determines only “can”-probabilities, a differentiated potential for a material-energetic realization. The Wirklichkeit’s fundamentally open, creative, immaterial omni-connectedness permits us to regard the inanimate and the animate world as merely different – statically stable respectively open and statically unstable, but dynamically stabilized – articulations of an all-embracing “pre-living” cosmos." (Potsdam Manifesto & Potsdam Denkschrift)

The dynamic processes of interaction and transformation within the relational webs of quantums exponentiates in a “higher” living what humans experience in the “mesosphere” of bio- and geo-ecological animated world.

"Animate nature draws its ability for continued, creative differentiate and cooperative integration from its “pre-living” (microphysically recognizable) primordial ground, whose “information”, through instabilities, rises enhanced into the meso-sphere, where it unfolds in more intense and richer form. The “pre-living” realm thus organizes itself in the complex variety of our “higher” bio-ecological vibrancy, as we encounter it in everyday life. Cultural-ecological variety and its developmental forms, i.e., its processes of transformation and balance, ultimately also results from this context." (Potsdam Manifesto & Potsdam Denkschrift)

Determinisms and linear casualties are just of conditional guiltiness, are part of our instrumental knowledge. But they are not applicable to our patterns of thinking and to determine our imagined worlds via our orientation knowledge.

The diverse processes and relations between individuals, cultures, organisms and ecological complexes are demanding within open systems different patterns of action and creations of strategies, than it is feasible within the old mechanistic constructions, theorems and predefinitions of the scientific description of “the” reality.

"From this new viewpoint, the world – the Wirklichkeit – no longer appears as a theoretically closed system. This leads to an inherent indeterminism that results from the fundamental indivisibility and that is expressed in an inherent limitation of the “knowable”. Strictly speaking, we are thus forced to speak about the Wirklichkeit only in parables and analogies. There are in principle no longer answers to all the questions that, from a human standpoint, we believe we can pose, because the answers go nowhere." (Potsdam Manifesto & Potsdam Denkschrift)

With a “farewell” towards the old images of substance and its replacement by “relatedness” and “connectivity”, the borders between power of interpretations in-between natural sciences and humanities / cultural sciences are getting blurred. The theoretical fundamentals of verification and falsification of “reality” are - severely taken - dissolving. Also and particularly the fundamentals of our social, cultural, economical and political sciences and their traditions are put basically into question, since they constructed complex, but nevertheless deterministically closed theorems in their course of emancipation to the “hard” natural sciences.

"The materialistic-mechanistic worldview of classical physics, with its rigid ideas and reductive way of thinking, became the supposedly scientifically legitimated ideology for vast areas of scientific and political-strategic thinking. The progressing uniformity of all ideas of value and affluence, habits of consumption and economic strategies on the pattern of a Western/North American/European knowledge society is still legitimated by a way of thinking that argues for a rational objectifiability of the Wirklichkeit on the basis of secured scientific foundations. Where conflicts arise, a lack of instrumental knowledge is diagnosed and compensatory delivery is prescribed. The foundations of this orientation are seldom questioned, though there is reason enough to do so." (Potsdam Manifesto & Potsdam Denkschrift)

Via those fundamental and inelastic world views economical, political and socio-cultural strategies and forms of organisation were legitimised above centuries, and, along that way, followed by increasing perils in an animated world. The recent crises scenarios are forcing up and unloading in all societal, economical, political and cultural as well as ecological levels.

== Guiding to New Requirements ==
Potsdam Manifesto & Potsdam Denkschrift are guiding to new requirements on our organisation and our handling within a multifarious living world.

"Quantum physics – and not just it – challenges us to emancipate our thinking from rigid structures so that flexible relationships can take their place. It becomes possible to loosen and gently dissolve the monostructural, centralistic constructions, forms of expression preferred by the materialistic-mechanistic worldview." (Potsdam Manifesto & Potsdam Denkschrift)

The relief of narrow and mechanistic strategy-patterns, reductions and averaging forms a basic matter.

"It is urgently necessary to enable an integrative cooperation among the diverse economic exchange strategies among people, communities, and their natural surroundings as well as among the patterns of distribution in production, use, and supply, in order to ensure the provision of the necessities of life and the structural and institutional prerequisites for socio-economic exchange. The development of new decentralized and polycentric structures of production, supply, and decision-making has special relevance – indeed priority." (Potsdam Manifesto & Potsdam Denkschrift)

Potsdam Denkschrift & Potsdam Manifesto identify necessary drastic changes concerning our future actions. They demand "... a strategic orientation toward the paradigm of what lives" (Potsdam Manifesto & Potsdam Denkschrift). Because "if we continue to “tilt” our common playing field of life by unrestrainedly striving for power, so that the majority of humankind and a great part of all living creatures are slipping off, our problems will grow into a catastrophe." (Potsdam Manifesto & Potsdam Denkschrift)

== Appeal to Stop the Suppressing of the Potentials of Evolution ==
They close with the urgent appeal to stop the suppressing of the potentials of evolution via our mindset:

"The confrontations and distortions we daily experience in our civilization should not allow ourselves to be led astray. Our existence as human beings today shows us that we, too, are the successful result of a similar development that has already gone on for billions of years." (Potsdam Manifesto & Potsdam Denkschrift)

Potsdam Denkschrift & Potsdam Manifest finalise with the position, that the humankind is not imprisoned in its self-constructed conditions, but - as result of an animated, basically cooperative embedding - is capable of acting and transformation:

"For omni-connectedness, which we can also call love and from which life springs, is fundamentally inherent in us and in everything else." (Potsdam Manifesto & Potsdam Denkschrift)

== Signees ==
The Potsdam Manifesto was signed by more than 130 scientists and personalities from all over the world.
