= Frankfurt-Hohenheim Leitfaden =

Ethical investment criteriology

The Frankfurt-Hohenheim Leitfaden (Frankfurt-Hohenheim Guidelines) is the first criteriology for ethical-ecological or environmental, social, and governance (ESG) evaluation methods for investments. The guide screens public companies for cultural, social, and natural compatibility and was the most comprehensive criteria for ethical investments.

It was developed in 1997 by the research group "Ethical-Ecological Rating", which Johannes Hoffmann and Gerhard Scherhorn founded in 1992.

== History ==
In 1989, Johannes Hoffmann, a business ethicist at the University of Frankfurt, was asked by managers at Deutsche Bank, where church institutions had invested money in the tens of billions, to develop a criteriology for evaluating capital investments. In 1991, Hoffmann contacted the then Wirtschaftsweisen, Professor Gerhard Scherhorn of the University of Hohenheim in Stuttgart. Together they came to the conclusion that without a differentiated scientifically elaborated criteriology, which, in addition to economics and ecology, also took into account the rationale of culture-specific human rights, no sustainability agency, company or investor could be persuaded to invest in ethical-ecological products. Therefore, in 1992, both founded the research group "Ethical-Ecological Rating", which started its work in 1993.

Initially, the group met either in Frankfurt or in Hohenheim to develop or distribute concrete tasks and questions to the researchers. To achieve interdisciplinarity in the group, it was initially composed of scientific collaborators from Scherhorn's and Hoffmann's fields. After several symposia in the following years, further experts from Europe, Latin America, Asia, Africa and representatives of Christianity, Islam and Buddhism became involved. Discussions were held on the inclusion of cross-cultural questions on human rights and on survival criteria of industrialized, developing and emerging countries. Consistently, these specifications led to a discussion of the 1986 United Nations Declaration on the "Right to Development." Subsequently, sociologists, philosophers, natural scientists and theologians, as well as other collaborators from all practical disciplines, countries of origin and religious faiths were recruited for the project to ensure its concrete intercultural usefulness.

This resulted in the Frankfurt-Hohenheim Guide in 1997, which, with 850 individual criteria, was the first theoretical basis for the ethical evaluation of companies and capital investments. Since then, the guide has been the basis for the evaluation of ethical-ecological assessment and rating methods for monetary and capital investments.

== Initial thesis ==
The 1995 report of the Club of Rome states that the limits to growth have already been exceeded. Economic leaders have come to the conclusion that economic growth no longer serves to increase people's prosperity, but has rather become an end in itself, serving to increase monetary wealth. Therefore, social forces should be mobilized to create cultural pressure that enables the social market economy to mediate between liberalism and socialism, between competition and solidarity, and between economy and ecology. In order to achieve changes in the global economic system, money flows must be directed into channels that lead to small-scale changes in the normal range and that provide for innovations that could bring the destructive potentials associated with our economic system under control, and provide impulses for the development of a socially, naturally and culturally compatible mode of production and economy.

Up to then, the evaluation of financial investments or companies had been based on creditworthiness, profitability, transaction costs, maturity and tax aspects. Against the background of cultural pressures and social movements, money should also be invested with ethical considerations in mind. More and more people were apparently starting from the premise that ethically based investments can be an instrument for ensuring economic changes that produce ecologically and socially compatible technological developments.

== Methodology, Structure ==
The criteriology with a total of 850 individual criteria is based on the concept of allegorical value tree analysis according to Ortwin Renn, a German sociologist, economist and sustainability scientist.

=== Cultural compatibility ===
Examines the compatibility of economic activity with the progressive cultivation of society's will to shape itself in the direction of the individual's opportunities for life and development, the community's ability to integrate, the survivability of the natural world with and after us, and the opportunities for cultural development (cf. 1986 Convention on Human Rights).

=== Social compatibility ===
Describes working conditions, social standards and human rights. In order to avoid social dumping and human rights violations, globally applicable framework conditions are essential. This includes uniform corporate standards on hiring and firing principles, equality principles, remuneration and job security, among others.

=== Nature compatibility ===
Assesses the main criteria specifically for eco-rating and is broken down into the action areas of environmental institutions, information, technology, living things, energy, materials, transport and emissions.

== Publications ==
- The Frankfurt-Hohenheim Guidelines and their implementation via the Corporate Responsibility Rating, Ethical-Ecological Rating / oekom research AG (Ed.), Ethical-Ecological Rating, 2nd extended and updated edition, Band 8, ökom Verlag Munich 2002, ISBN 3-928244-64-7
- "Where We Stand When It Comes to Sustainable Financial Markets", In: The European Central Bank as a Sustainability Role Model. Philosophical, Ethical and Economic Perspectives; Springer Nature Switzerland 2021, S. 1–10.
- "Ethische Kriterien für die Bewertung von Unternehmen-Frankfurt-Hohenheimer -Leitfaden", Johannes Hoffmann/ Konrad Ott/ Gerhard Scherhorn, (Hrsg.), German and Englisch; IKO-Verlag Frankfurt/Stuttgart 1997, ISBN 3-88939-356-X
- "Systemänderung oder Kollaps unseres Planeten, Erklärung der Forschungsgruppe Ethisch-Ökologisches Rating der Goethe-Universität Frankfurt - Arbeitskreis Wissenschaft", Altius Verlag, Erkelenz 2016 (in German)
- Projektgruppe Ethisch-ökologisches Rating / oekom research AG (Hrsg.) Ethisch-ökologisches Rating. Der Frankfurt-Hohenheimer Leitfaden und seine Umsetzung durch das Corporate Responsibility Rating, 2. Erweiterte Auflage, Schriftenreiheh zur ökologischen Kommunikation Band 7, oekom-Verlag 2002; ISBN 3-928244-92-2 (in German)

== See also ==
- Christian finance
- Corporate governance
- Eco-investing
- Ethical finance
- Islamic banking and finance
- Socially responsible investing
