= Radach =

Radach is a surname. Notable people with the surname include:

- Benji Radach (1979–2024), American mixed martial artist
- Helmut Radach (1915–1999), German rower

== See also ==
- Radack
