= Hans-Peter Dürr =

German physicist

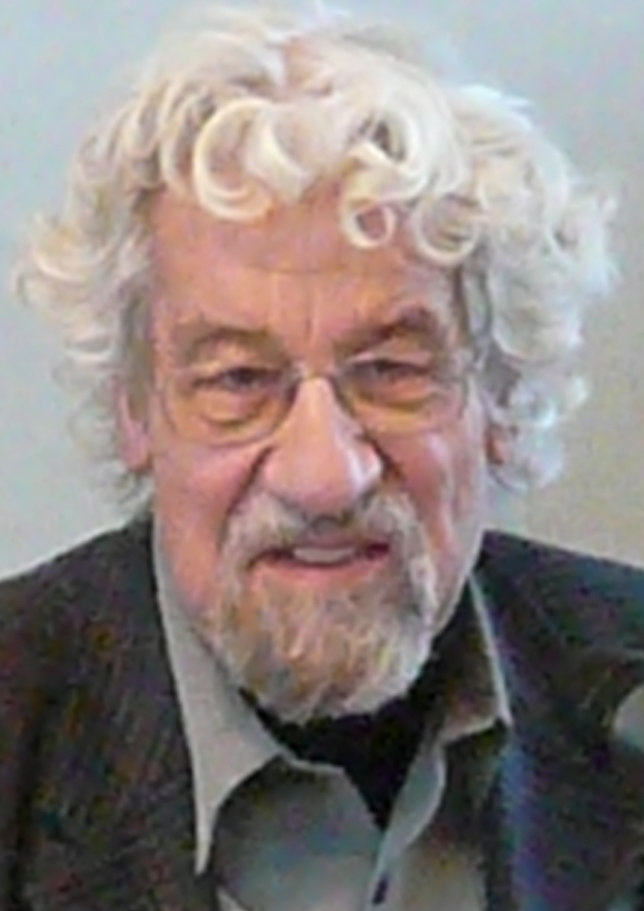
- Dürr in 2007
- Born: 7 October 1929; Stuttgart, Germany
- Died: 18 May 2014 (aged 84); Munich, Germany
- Occupation: Physicist
- Awards: Order of Merit of the Federal Republic of Germany, Right Livelihood Award

Hans-Peter Dürr (7 October 1929 – 18 May 2014) was a German physicist. He worked on nuclear and quantum physics, elementary particles and gravitation, epistemology, and philosophy, and he advocated responsible scientific and energy policies. In 1987, he was awarded the Right Livelihood Award for "his profound critique of the Strategic Defense Initiative (SDI) and his work to convert high technology to peaceful uses".

== Early life and education ==
Hans-Peter Dürr was born in Stuttgart in 1929. He studied physics in Stuttgart, graduating with a Diploma in 1953 and did postgraduate studies at University of California, Berkeley, completing his Ph.D. in 1956 supervised by Edward Teller.

== Career ==
From 1958 until 1976 he was a research associate of Werner Heisenberg, specializing in nuclear physics, quantum physics, elementary particles and gravitation epistemology and philosophy. He was Heisenberg's closest ally in their attempts to develop a unified field theory of elementary particles. In 1962 he habilitated at LMU Munich. The same year he was a guest professor in Berkeley, California and Madras, India.

Until 1997 he was professor of physics at LMU Munich. Between 1978 and 1997, he was the executive director of the Max Planck Institute for Physics (Werner-Heisenberg-Institute) and Max Planck Institute for Astrophysics in Munich several times. He was Vice executive director from 1972 to 1977, 1981–1986 and 1993–1995.

=== Advocacy ===
In the 1980s, Dürr advocated the cause of peace as a member of the Pugwash Conferences on Science and World Affairs. In 1983, he helped co-fund the Scientists' Initiative "Responsibility for Peace", which led to the Scientists' Peace Congress in Mainz attended by 3,300 scientists and the Mainzer Appell, a declaration against further nuclear armament. In 1990, another large scientists' convention in Göttingen warned against the militarization of space. In support of these conventions, Dürr gave a series of lectures at numerous German universities. Dürr was a leading critic of the US Strategic Defense Initiative (SDI), otherwise known as Star Wars.

In 1986 Dürr proposed a World Peace Initiative, on a similar scale to the SDI, to solve environmental problems, and achieve social justice and peace. In 1987 this was reborn as the Global Challenges Network, which received the Right Livelihood Award together with Dürr.

More recently, Dürr contributed to the global environmental movement. He served as a member of the board of Greenpeace Germany and as a member of the International Advisory Council on the Economic Development of Hainan in Harmony with the Natural Environment in China. In 1996, Dürr was made a member of the UN Secretary General's international advisory group for the Habitat II Conference in Istanbul.

Dürr was a member of the Club of Rome and served on the scientific committee of the Vienna Internationale Akademie für Zukunftsfragen, advocating sustainable, equitable, and viable development, emphasizing energy efficiency and sufficiency as a point of entry. He was a founder member of the German Vereinigung für Ökologische Ökonomie.

== Later years, emeritus after 1997 ==
In 2005, together with Daniel Dahm and Rudolf zur Lippe, he published the Potsdam Manifesto and the Potsdam Denkschrift as a follow-up to the Russell–Einstein Manifesto of 1955. They were signed by a large group of scientists from all over the world, including 20 laureates of the Right Livelihood Award.

From 2006 until his death, he was a founding councillor at the World Future Council, and a supporter of the Campaign for the Establishment of a United Nations Parliamentary Assembly, an organisation which campaigns for the democratic reformation of the United Nations.

He also championed various social justice causes, and helped fund the "David against Goliath" organization protesting against a nuclear fuel reprocessing plant in Bavaria.

== Personal life ==
Dürr was married for more than 50 years and had 4 children and numerous grandchildren. He died in May 2014 in Munich.

== Honors ==
- Award of Merit 1956, Oakland in USA;
- Right Livelihood Award 1987 („Alternative Nobelprice“), Stockholm;
- Waldemar-von-Knoeringen-Award 1989, Munich;
- Ecology Award „Goldene Schwalbe“ 1990, Darmstadt;
- Natura Obligat Medaille 1991, University of the Bundeswehr Munich;
- Elise and Walter Haas International Award 1993, University of California;
- Medal `München leuchtet' 1996 in Gold, Culture Award Munich;
- Honorary Doctor Dr.phil. h.c, 2002, University Oldenburg, Philosophical Faculty;
- Großes Verdienstkreuz des Bundesverdienstorden der Bundesrepublik Deutschland, 2004, Berlin.

== Memberships ==
- Deutsche Akademie der Naturforscher Leopoldina, Halle, 1975;
- Rhodes Scholarship Foundation, Vorsitzender des deutschen Auswahlausschusses, Hamburg, 1979–1982;
- Vereinigung Deutscher Wissenschaftler, Berlin, Vorstand, 1980–1986, und Vorstandsvorsitzender, 1991–97, 2000-;
- E.F.-Schuhmacher-Gesellschaft, Kuratorium, Munich, 1980-;
- Studiengruppe Sanfte Energietechnologien München SESAM, LMU Munich 1981-1983;
- Naturwissenschaftler Initiative – Verantwortung für den Frieden, Mainz, 1983;
- Pugwash Conferences on Science and World Affairs, London/Geneva, 1983, Council 1987-97,
- Peace-Nobel Prize 1995;
- Energiekommission der Landeshauptstadt, Munich, 1983-;
- Wissenschaftszentrum München, Vorstand Beirat, 1983-;
- Scientists against Nuclear Weapons and for Peace, Sowjetische Akademie der Wissenschaften, Moskau, 1984-;
- August-Bebel-Kreis, Tübingen, 1986–1990;
- Greenpeace Deutschland, Hamburg, Vorstand, 1985–92;
- Stabilitätsorientierte Sicherheitspolitik, Starnberg, Codirector Forschungsprojekt 1986-1988;
- Institut für Friedensforschung und Sicherheitspolitik, Wissenschaftlicher Beirat, Universität Hamburg, 1986-;
- Global Challenges Network, München, Gründer und Vorstand, 1987;
- Akademie der Wissenschaften der DDR, Berlin, 1987;
- International Foundation for the Survival and Development of Humanity, Moskau, Mitbegründer und Vorstand, 1988;
- Institut für sozial-ökologische Forschung, Frankfurt, Wiss. Beirat, 1989-;
- Internationale Akademie für Zukunftsfragen, Wien, Vorstand und Wissenschaftliches Präsidium, 1990;
- Economic Development of Hainan in Harmony with the Natural Environment, Intern. Adv. Council, PR China, 1990–93;
- Die Umweltakademie/Umwelt und Management, Oberpfaffenhofen, Vorsitzender Kuratorium, 1990–97, Vorstand, 1998;
- Club of Rome, Paris, 1991;
- Europäische Stiftung für Natur- und Kulturvermögen, Prag, Mitbegründer und Präsident, 1991–2001;
- Academia Scientiarum et Artium Europaea, Salzburg, 1991-, Prodekan, 1993–1995;
- International Network of Engineers and Scientists for Global Responsibility INES, Hamburg, 1992-;
- Lenkungsausschuss der „Consultative“, DUA Oberpfaffenhofen/München, 1992–1994;
- Center for Science of Hope, International Center for Integrated Studies, ICIS. Advisory Council, New York 1993;
- Freunde und Förderer der Robert-Jungk-Stiftung, Ehrenmitglied, Salzburg, 1993-;
- Bulletin of the Atomic Scientists, Vorstand, Chicago, 1993–95;
- Potsdam Institute for Climate Impact Research PIK, Wissenschaftlicher. Beirat, 1993–2003;
- Muhammad Abdus Salam Foundation, Stiftungsrat, London, 1993–1995;
- Volkshochschule, Kuratorium, München, 1994–1996;
- Global Commission to Fund the U .N., Washington D.C, 1995;
- Institut für Zukunftsstudien und Technologiebewertung IZT, Wissenschaftlicher Beirat, Berlin, 1995-;
- Gruppe Energie 2010: Zukünftige Energiepolitik, Niedersächsische Energie-Agentur, Hannover, 1995-1998.
- U.N. Conference of Human Settlements, Habitat II, International Advisory Council, New York, 1996;
- David gegen Goliath, München, 1996, Ehrenmitglied; 1996;
- RIO-Impuls Luzern, Schweiz, Beirat, 1996-;
- Ludwig-Bölkow-Stiftung München, Kuratorium, 1998–2004;
- Roland-Röhl-Stiftung Göttingen, Kuratorium Vorsitzender, 1998;
- Global Forum of Spiritual and Parliamentary Leaders, New York, Co-Chair Science, 1999-;
- Stiftung für die Rechte zukünftiger Generationen, Oberursel Beirat, 1999;
- The State of the World Forum, San Francisco, Gorbachev Foundation, International Coordinating Council, 1999;
- Herrmann-Knoblauch-Akademie, Schirmherr, Hannover, 1999;
- Bayerische Akademie der Schönen Künste, München, Ehrenmitglied, 2000;
- Commission on Globalization, The State of the World Forum San Francisco, New York, 2001;
- Friends of Health, Washington, Scientific Advisory Committee, 2000;
- Koalition für Leben und Frieden, München, 2002-;
- Stiftung Insel Hombroich, Neuß, Kuratorium, 2003-;
- Lassalle Institut, Bad Schönbrunn, Schweiz, Patronatskomitee, 2003-;
- International Physicians for the Prevention of Nuclear War (Peace Nobel Prize, 1985), Berlin, Scientific Advisory Board, 2004.

== Books (selection) ==
- What is Life? Scientific Approaches and Philosophical Positions (co-author, co-ed.), World Scientific, 2002, ISBN 981-02-4740-0
- Unified Theories of Elementary Particles (ed.), Springer Verlag, 1982.
- Werner Heisenberg, Gesammelte Werke (co-ed.), 9 vols., Piper und Springer Verlag (1985–1993).
- Physik und Transzendenz (ed.), Scherz Verlag, 1986.
- Das Netz des Physikers, Hanser Verlag, 1988.
- De la Science à l’Éthique, Bibliothèque Albin Michel Sciences 1988.
- Geist und Natur (ed.), Scherz Verlag, 1989.
- Respekt vor der Natur - Verantwortung für die Natur, Piper Verlag, 1994.
- Die Zukunft ist ein unbetretener Pfad, Herder Verlag, 1995.
- Zukünftige Energiepolitik (co-author), Economica Verlag, 1995.
- Umweltverträgliches Wirtschaften (co-ed.), Agenda Verlag, 1995.
- Gott, der Mensch und die Wissenschaft (co-author), Pattloch Verlag, 1997.
- Rupert Sheldrake in der Diskussion (co-ed.), Scherz Verlag, 1997.
- Für eine zivile Gesellschaft, dtv 2000.
- Elemente des Lebens (co-ed.), Graue Edition, 2000.
- Wir erleben mehr als wir begreifen (co-author), Herder spektrum, 2001.
- Wirklichkeit, Wahrheit, Werte und die Wissenschaft (co-author, co-ed.), BWV, 2003.
- Auch die Wissenschaft spricht nur in Gleichnissen, Herder spektrum, 2004.
- H.P.Dürr/Raimon Panikkar: Liebe - Urquelle des Kosmos − Ein Gespräch über Naturwissenschaft und Religion, Herder Vlg. (Herder Tb.5965), Freiburg 2008, ISBN 978-3-451-05965-0
