= Eva Lang (economist) =

German economist

Eva Lang (born January 10, 1947, in Stuttgart) is a German economist. Before her retirement, she was full professor at the University of the Bundeswehr Munich for economic policy in special consideration of political economy.

== Vita ==
Lang studied economics and political science and obtained her doctorate and habilitation on the topics of infrastructure, business cycle theory and public finance. After an assistantship at University of Würzburg, she was appointed to a professorship at Fachhochschule Westküste in Heide, Germany. Starting in 1996, she was professor at the University of the Bundeswehr Munich. She is founder member and since 2014 anew president of the steering committee of Vereinigung für Ökologische Ökonomie (VÖÖ), a German partner organisation of International Society for Ecological Economics. She is member of the board of trustees of Bürgerstiftung München, a civic society in Munich.

Her academic focus is ecological economics, sustainable social and budgetary policy, precautionary economics and eco-social modernization.

== Literatur ==
- Eva Lang (1975), Ansatzpunkte und Konzeptionen zur Bestimmung der konjunkturgerechten Budgetpolitik (in German), Meisenheim (am Glan): Hain, ISBN 3-445-01260-1 (Zugleich Dissertation der Wirtschafts- und Sozialwissenschaftlichen Fakultät der Universität Würzburg)
- Eva Lang; Edmund Ziemer (1979), Folgekosten : Kostenbemessung und Gestaltung von Folgekostenverträgen (in German), vol. 3, Stuttgart u.a.: Richard Boorberg, ISBN 3-415-00777-4
- Eva Lang; Walter A. S. Koch (1980), Staatsverschuldung, Staatsbankrott? (in German), vol. 2, Würzburg: Physica, ISBN 978-3-662-41479-8
- Eva Lang (1992), Budgetorientierte Investitionspolitik einer Gebietskörperschaft (in German), Baden-Baden: Nomos-Verlag
- Eva Lang (2000), A. Biesecker; M. Mathes; S. Schön; B. Scurrell (eds.), "Entwurf einer Politik des Vorsorgenden Wirtschaftens", Vorsorgendes Wirtschaften. Auf dem Weg zu einer Ökonomie des Guten Lebens (in German), Bielefeld, pp. 215–223
- Eva Lang, ed. (2003), "Mutter Natur und Vater Staat: Zukunftsperspektiven und Gestaltungsansätze einer schwierigen Beziehung im Zeichen der Nachhaltigkeit", Beiträge und Berichte der Vereinigung für Ökologische Ökonomie (in German), Karlsruhe, ISBN 978-3-00-011297-3 (online, PDF, 860 kB)
- Eva Lang (2007), "Finanzpolitik des Staates auf dem Prüfstand der Nachhaltigkeit", in Eva Lang; Christiane Busch-Lüty; Jürgen Kopfmüller (eds.), Wiedervorlage dringend: Ansätze für eine Ökonomie der Nachhaltigkeit (in German), München: oekom, pp. 172–184, ISBN 978-3-86581-070-0
- Eva Lang (2009), "Die aktuelle Weltwirtschaftskrise und der ökologische Umbau der Wirtschaft", Wirtschaftsdienst (in German), vol. 11, no. 89, pp. 743–747
- Eva Lang (2011), "Multiple Krisen: Wahrnehmungs- und Reaktionsmuster", in Günter Altner; Heike Leitschuh; Gerd Michelsen; Ernst Ulrich von Weizsäcker; Udo E. Simonis (eds.), Grüner Umbau (in German), S. Hirzel, ISBN 978-3-7776-2152-4
- Eva Lang; Theresia Wintergerst (2012), Am Puls des langen Lebens: Soziale Innovationen für die alternde Gesellschaft (in German), München: oekom, ISBN 978-3-86581-223-0
- Axel Schaffer; Eva Lang; Susanne Hartard, eds. (2014), Systeme in der Krise im Fokus von Resilienz und Nachhaltigkeit (in German), Marburg: Metropolis, ISBN 978-3-7316-1061-8
