= Daniel Dahm =

German geographer

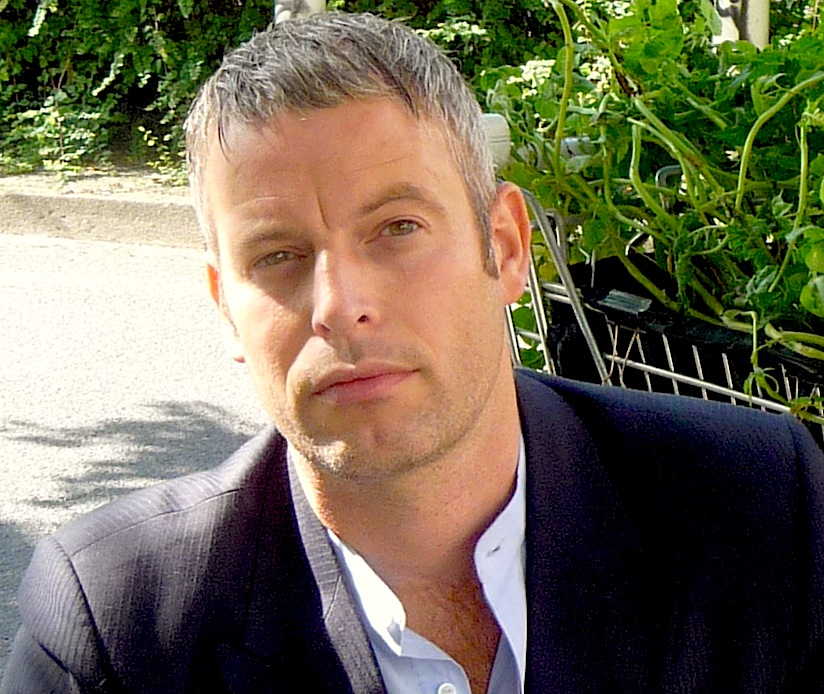
J. Daniel Dahm

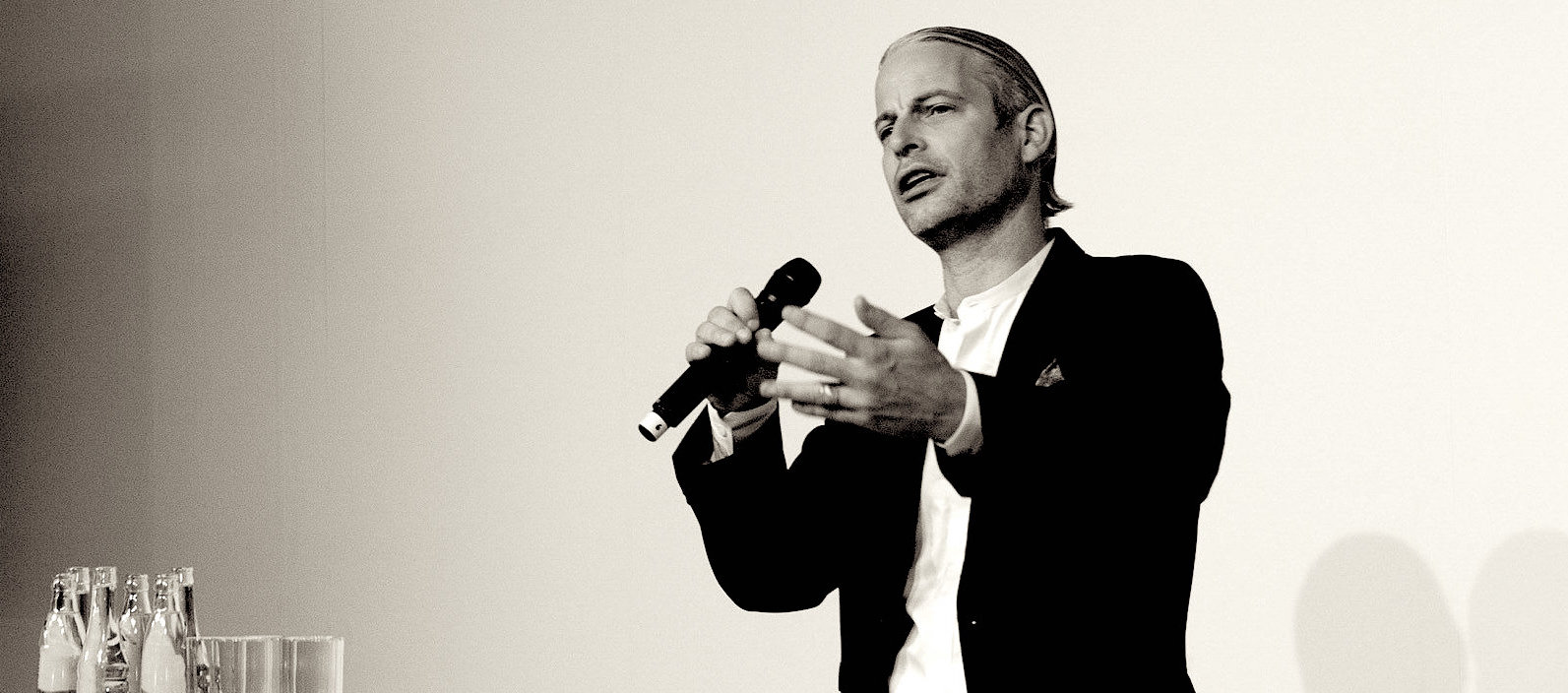
Lecture Ecostyle 2014

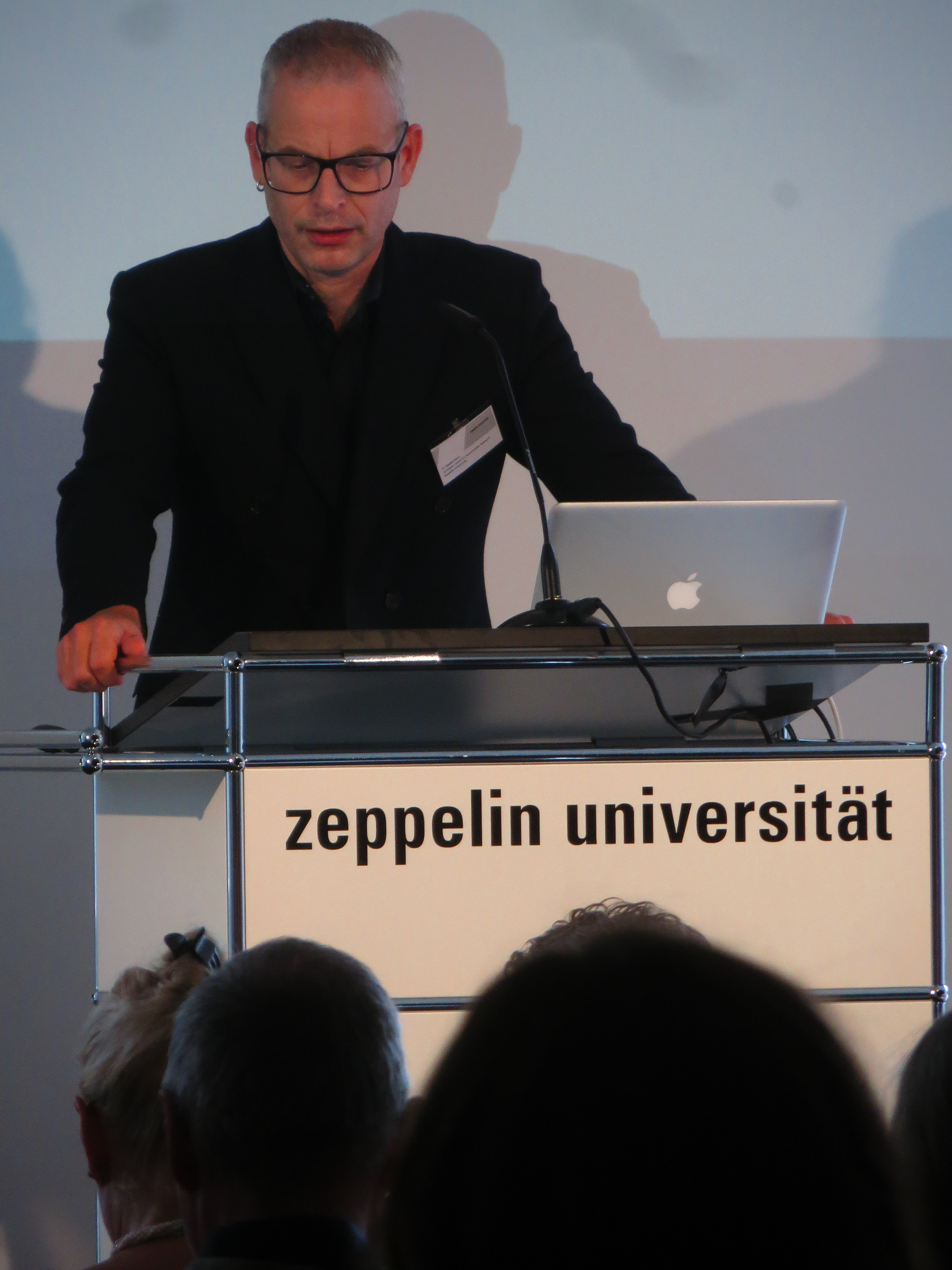
ECS-Jahrestagung 2017

Johannes Daniel Dahm (*born 1969 at Cologne) is a German geographer, ecologist, activist, consultant and entrepreneur.

As a multidisciplinary scientist, he works in the fields of sustainability and development research, ecological economics and ecological creation of values, future of work, plurality and diversity of life.

Dahm's international reputation and acclaim are largely based on a work that followed in the footsteps of the 1955 Russell-Einstein Manifesto – the Potsdam Manifesto "We have to learn to think in a new way" and the Potsdam Denkschrift, carried by the Federation of German Scientists. In 2005 he composed them together with the quantum physicist Hans-Peter Dürr and the philosopher Rudolf Prinz zur Lippe. Above that, he published more than 50 scientific articles and book contributions, his range of lectures and publications reaches from philosophy of science over economical and civil society development, ecological approaches, up to city development and diversity of life.

== Biography ==
Dahm earned his doctorate in 2003 at the University of Cologne with his dissertation "Sustainable lifestyles – urban subsistence for higher quality of life" focusing on the interplay between sustainable lifestyles, non-monetary economies and civil society.

From 1997 until 2005 he was member of the Wuppertal Institute for Climate, Environment and Energy and worked closely together with the economist and former member of the German Council of Economic Experts Prof. Dr. Gerhard Scherhorn. As research leader at the Institute for Household- and Consumer Economics, University of Hohenheim he worked until 2004 on "urban subsistence as urban infrastructure" . Inter alia he lectured at the Institute for Social Anthropology / Martin Luther University of Halle-Wittenberg. 2006 to 2007 he was appointed as Research Fellow for Science in Innovation at the Natural History Museum London towards the interplay of diversity and plurality of life and its complexity. Later he became the scientific director of the research group Ethical-Ecological Rating at Goethe-University, and until 2018 Vice Director of the European Centre for Sustainability Research (ECS) at Zeppelin University, Friedrichshafen, Germany. Furthermore, he is senior fellow of the Institute for Advanced Sustainability Studies. 2000 he was awarded with the Schweisfurth Research Award for Ecological Economics by the Society for Ecological Economy (Vereinigung für Oekologische Oekonomie Germany). 2008 he was honoured as Fellow for responsible leadership of BMW Foundation Herbert Quandt.

Additionally, he is Councillor of the World Future Council, Member of the German Association Club of Rome, Member of the Federation of German Scientists VDW, Ambassador of the Association for the Promotion of the Economy for the Common Good / (Gemeinwohloekonomie), and Member of the Scientific Committee of Consorzio Costellazione Apulia. In the exhibition sector, he holds since 2010 the Chair of the Jury at Internorga Trade Fair at Hamburg Messe und Congress HMC. In 2019 he was one of the initial signatories of Scientists for Future, and since then member of their advisory board.

Above this, he is founder and Managing Director of United Sustainability Group, an investment and consultancy company emphasizing strategic impact investment for sustainable development.

Daniel Dahm has co-founded several civil society organizations and enterprises and holds various positions in several non-profit-organizations.

- 2011 - He was Co-founder and Chairman of the first international trade fair for sustainable consume goods “good-goods“ at Hamburg Messe und Congress HMC.
- 2012 to 2015 - He was Co-founder and Chairman of the advisory board of Ecostyle Trade fair for sustainable design at Messe Frankfurt Exhibition.
- 2011 to 2015 - He was Member of the AK Financial Policy at the Advisory Board for Sustainable Development of the Federal State of Brandenburg.
- 2009 - He was Co-founder of Desertec Foundation, an international endeavour to realize a worldwide energy transition by the utilization of renewable energies.
- 2007 - He was Co-founder of the internet platform for sustainable consume www.utopia.de and Curator of the Utopia-Foundation.
- 2007 - He was Founding Member of the board of Eco-Social Forum Germany (ÖSF Deutschland).

== Selected publications ==
- Regenerative economy: the embedding of circularity. In: Hinske, C.; Lehmann, H.; et al. (Ed.) (2022): The Impossibilities of the Circular Economy. Routledge. 2022.
- mit Gerhard Scherhorn: Urbane Subsistenz. Die zweite Quelle des Wohlstands. Oekom, München (Erstaufl. 2008). 2. Auflage. 2021.
- mit Günter Koch: Precursors of an Economics for the Anthropocene. In: Carrillo, F. J. u. Koch, G. (2021): Knowledge for the Anthropocene. A WCI strategic focus report. Mexico City. 2021.
- The Sustainability Zeroline – a severe standard for a truly sustainable, a regenerative economy. In: Goydke, Tim u. Koch, Günter (2021): Economy for the Common Good. A Common Standard for a Pluralistic World? Studies in International Management, Politics and Economies No. 1. HSB. Bremen. 2021.
- Den Neuanfang wagen – Vom Aufbruch in eine lebensdienliche Ökonomie. In: Lesen ohne Atomstrom (Hrsg.) (2021): Act Now! Reflexionen in existentiellen Zeiten. Hamburg.
- Benchmark Nachhaltigkeit. Sustainability Zeroline. Das Maß für eine zukunftsfähige Ökonomie. Transcript, Bielefeld 2019.
- Corporate Sustainable Restructuring CSR. Springer, München / Berlin 2015.
- mit S. Bannas: The decline of the Fossil Age is the rise of distributive justice. In: International Development Policy Series. Graduate Institute of International Development Studies. Genf 2011.
- Evolution von Digitalem Empowerment und virtuellen Netzwerken. Infrastrukturen einer zukunftsfähigen Ökonomie. In: H. Burda, et al.: 2020 – Gedanken zur Zukunft des Internets. Essen 2010.
- Prinzipien einer ökologisch sozialen Marktwirtschaft. Basispapier zu einer zukunftsfähigen Wirtschaftsordnung. Berlin 2009.
- Daniel Dahm Declaration. Towards Sustainable Business Cultures. BMW Stiftung Herbert Quandt. Berlin 2009.
- mit H.-P. Dürr, R. zur Lippe: Global Justice, Equality and World Domestic Policy – The Potsdam Manifesto. In: Global Marshall Plan Initiative: Towards a World in Balance. Hamburg 2007.
- Zivile Keimzellen der Halbtagsgesellschaft – Potentiale Bürgerschaftlicher Einrichtungen. In: C. Stahmer, S. Hartard, A. Schaffer: Die Halbtagsgesellschaft. Nomos. Baden-Baden 2006.
- Einfach leben in Lebendigkeit und Vielfalt – Grundlagen zukunftsfähiger Lebensstile. Pittenhardt 2006.
- mit Hans-Peter Dürr, Rudolf zur Lippe: Potsdamer Manifest 2005 “We have to learn to think in a new way” & Potsdamer Denkschrift 2005. Oekom, Berlin / München 2005.
- Ökonomie der Zivilgesellschaft. In: Zukünfte. Nr. 47. Berlin 2004.
- Motivation & Engagement. In: Zukünfte. Nr. 48. Berlin 2004.
- Gerechter Agrarhandel braucht einen gerechten und intelligenten Weltmarkt. In: Perspektiven für einen gerechten Agrarhandel – Konzepte, Konflikte, Kooperationen. Rehburg-Loccum 2003.
- Zukunftsfähige Lebensstile – Städtische Subsistenz für mehr Lebensqualität. Dissertationsschrift. Köln 2003.
- mit K. Merkle: Feiern und Fördern. In: H. J. Clement (Hrsg.): Szene Berlin. Ein Kulturlesebuch. Berlin 2003.
- mit R. Fretschner, J. Hilbert, G. Scherhorn: Gemeinschaftsarbeit im Wohlfahrtsmix der Zukunft: unverzichtbar. In: G. Bosch, et al. (Hrsg.): Zukunft der Dienstleistungsgesellschaft. Campus. Frankfurt a. M. 2002.
