= Niko Paech =

German economist

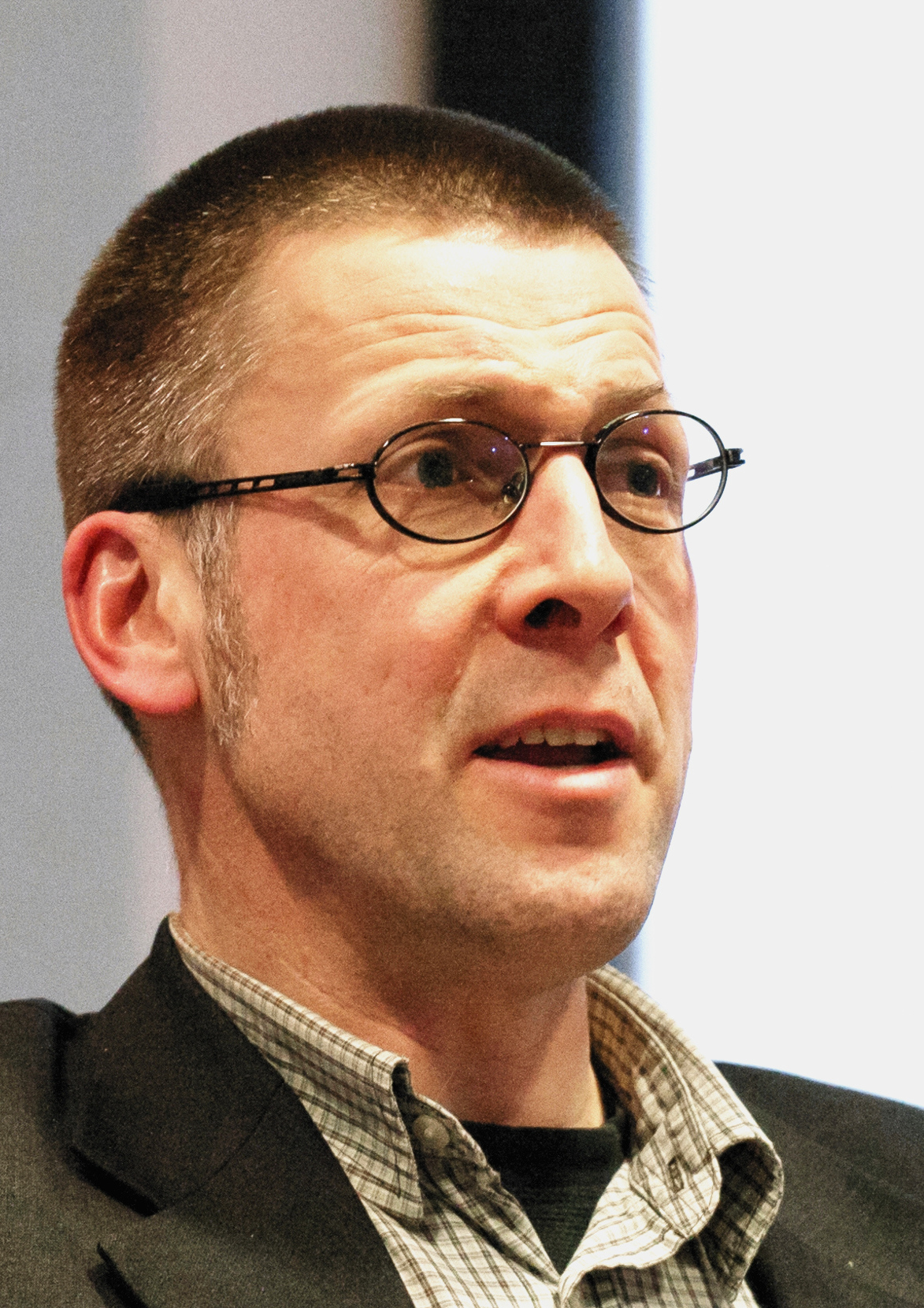
- Paech in 2011
- Born: Niko Paech; 9 December 1960 (age 65); Schüttorf
- Occupation: Economist
- Awards: Kapp-Forschungspreis für Ökologische Ökonomie

Niko Paech (born 9 December 1960) is a German economist. Since 2018, he has worked as a supernumerary ("außerplanmäßiger") professor at the University of Siegen. From 2010 to 2018, he was substitute professor at the chair of production and environment (PUM) at the University of Oldenburg. His research focuses on the fields of environmental economics, ecological economics and sustainability.

== Biography ==
Paech was born in Schüttorf, Germany. He gained a diploma in economics in 1987 from the University of Osnabrück, where he continued to work until 1997, obtaining his PhD in 1993.

After working for a short period as a consultant in the organic food sector and as the Agenda 21 representative of the city Oldenburg, Paech took a position at the University of Oldenburg.

He was co-funder of CENTOS (Oldenburg Center for Sustainability Economics and Management) and is co-chairman of the Vereinigung für Ökologische Ökonomie (VÖÖ), a German ecological economics association, and a member of ZENARIO (Center for sustainable space developing Oldenburg) and the network KoBE e.V. (Expertise center for Building and Energy). Paech is also a member of and scientific adviser for attac-Germany and a founding member of the "Postfossil-Institut" (2011).

In 2006, he was awarded the Kapp Research Award for Ecological Economics for his work on "Sustainable business models beyond innovation and growth – a company-oriented theory of transformation". In 2014, he received the award "Mut zur Nachhaltigkeit" ("Standing up for Sustainability") from the magazine Zeit Wissen. The jury recognised Paech's contribution as a leading light in the worldwide post-growth debate. In an article published in the Guardian about the German post growth movement, he was characterized as "one of the more high-profile members of the movement".

== Post-growth economy ==
The post-growth economy Paech proposes is one that meets human needs independently of economic growth and which is characterized by degrowth. Post-growth economics intentionally distances itself from popular terms such as "sustainable", "green", "dematerialized" or "decarbonized", rejecting the idea that ecological sustainability can realistically be achieved through technological development alone within a system that continues to measure progress merely in terms of added economic value. Paech argues that it is necessary to overcome growth imperatives and to bring about a new economic order by acknowledging the failure of efforts to decouple environmental destruction and the consumption of resources from economic added value, addressing the need to raise overall well-being in society by applying happiness economics, and recognising economic limitations such as global maximum oil output.

Paech sketches 4 reasons for and 5 steps to implement his theory.

Reasons:

1. there is no empirical or theoretical reason to disconnect economical growth via markets and money from mankind-exterminating risks caused by ecological destruction such as the climate crisis
2. after achieving a certain level of income there is no further improvement of happiness achieving more monetary income
3. the "imperative logic of growth" - decreasing hunger, poverty (trend of global improvement interrupted in 2020), and economical inequality by further economical growth - is ambivalent
4. economical growth has economical limits like "peak oil". High demand for certain resources limits production capabilities. Highest demands in nations like China or India increases costs for resources that have been essential for growth so far

The Implementation of his approach is based upon five pillars: institutional innovations, material zero-sum games, regional economics, subsistence economy and sufficiency, "which conclusively lead to higher individual quality of life and promote the common good." He stresses that there are no sustainable products or sustainable technologies as such, only sustainable lifestyles.

1. decluttering and deceleration: it is pure economical logic to get rid of unnecessary goods and gadgets, claiming time, money, space and ecological resources providing little use. Individuals and society shall be liberated from unnecessary "goods"
2. balance out self and external supply. Dependence on external growth based economy supplies is at risk since interdependencies cause fragility (e.g.European dependence on Russian petrol/gas till the invasion of Ukraine, global dependence on Ukrainian grain). The longer the supply chains are the more fragile and less resilient they are in crisis. Stability is given by short distances between Production and consumption. There is a need for reactivation of basic skills such as gardening and repair satisfying basic needs without using monetary based, international dependent markets. Restructuring self- and foreign provided support should reduce money and growth dependency. Subsistence, community gardening, exchange rings, common use of land and tools are practical approaches for de-globalisation.
3. regional economics would decrease risks such as climate change(or the impact of global events like the Ukraine war on energy prices) since there is less need for individual mobility and transportation of goods. It should be supported by regional currencies keeping purchasing power in the region while using the advantages of monetary based economies, avoiding the risks of monetary integration in global markets. Concepts like Community supported agriculture allow the consumers participation in the production and distribution of supplies while sharing the risks of farming while creating more biological awareness, making consumers prosumers.
4. Goods that can not be avoided, such as high-technology like medical equipment, computers and agricultural tools and vehicles shall be limited in production, shared, repaired and used as long and intensive as possible making overproduction and scrapping unnecessary.
5. Institutional innovations: soil and monetary reforms, implementing local currencies equipped with interest free circulation safety. Environmental exposure limited by universal usage rights for each prosumer oriented on the planets capabilities to deal with pollution and carbon dioxide (Paech estimates 2-3 tonnes of CO_{2}/capita).

Markets, companies, innovations, money, and goods will be used in post-growth economy within natural limits.

== Literature ==
=== Works by Paech ===
- Niko Paech, Se libérer du superflu - vers une économie de post-croissance, éd. Rue de l'échiquier, Paris, 2017 ISBN 978-2-37425-057-1
- Niko Paech, Liberation from Excess - The road to a post-growth economy. oekom verlag, Munich 2012. ISBN 978-3-86581-324-4
- Niko Paech, Vom grünen Wachstum zur Postwachstumsökonomie. Warum weiteres wirtschaftliches Wachstum keine zukunftsfähige Option ist In: Woynowski, Boris et al. 2012 (Hg.): Wirtschaft ohne Wachstum?! Notwendigkeit und Ansätze einer Wachstumswende. ISSN 1431-8261 free access, 20 MB
- Niko Paech, Nachhaltiges Wirtschaften jenseits von Innovationsorientierung und Wachstum. Eine unternehmensbezogene Transformationstheorie. Metropolis-Verlag, Marburg 2005. ISBN 978-3-89518-523-6

=== Works about Paech's approaches ===
- Felix Wilmsen, Ignorant und verharmlosend. Dem Postwachstumsspektrum fehlt ein antifaschistischer Konsens - die politische Rechte weiß das zu nutzen. (Ignorant and trivialising: the post-growth community lacks an anti-fascist consensus and the political right knows how to take advantage, in German) analyse & kritik 655. December 10, 2019.
