= Federation of German Scientists =

The Federation of German Scientists - VDW (Vereinigung Deutscher Wissenschaftler e. V.) is a German non-governmental organization.

== History ==
Since its founding 1959 by Carl Friedrich von Weizsäcker, Otto Hahn, Max Born and further prominent nuclear scientists, known as Göttinger 18, who had previously publicly declared their position against the nuclear armament of the West German Bundeswehr, the Federation has been committed to the ideal of responsible Wissenschaft. The founders were almost identical to the "Göttinger 18" (compare the historical Göttingen Seven). Both the "Göttingen Manifesto" and the formation of the VDW were an expression of the new sense of responsibility felt by Otto Hahn and some scientists after the dropping of atomic bombs on Hiroshima and Nagasaki. The VDW tried to mirror the American Federation of Atomic Scientists. VDW has been identified as West Germany's Pugwash group.

Members of VDW feel committed to taking into consideration the possible military, political and economical implications and possibilities of atomic misuse when carrying out their scientific research and teaching. The Federation of German Scientists comprises around 400 scholars of different fields. The Federation of German Scientists addresses both interested members of the public and decision-makers on all levels of politics and society with its work. The politician Egon Bahr was a longstanding member. Georg Picht presented a radio series about the Limits of growth on behalf of the VDW in the 1970s. In 2005/2006, the VDW was the patron and main contributor to the Potsdam Manifesto‚ 'We have to learn to think in a new way’ and the Potsdam Denkschrift under co-authorship of Hans Peter Duerr and Daniel Dahm, together with Rudolf zur Lippe. Since 2022 Ulrike Beisiegel and Götz Neuneck are co-chairs of the VDW.

VDW was closely connected with the German Friedensbewegung (peace movement) in the 1980s. After 1999 VDW tried to regain public interest with the establishment of the Whistleblower Prize, awarded together with the German branch of the International Association of Lawyers Against Nuclear Arms (IALANA).

== Whistleblower Prize ==
The Whistleblower Prize worth 3,000 euro, is given biannually and was established in 1999. In 2015, the selection of Gilles-Éric Séralini generated some controversy. Ulrich Bahnsen in Die Zeit described VDW and IALANA as consisting of busybodies with best wills - and worst possible outcome in the case of this award. The opinion piece, featured in Zeit Online, described the awarding of Séralini as a failure, and viewed his status as a "whistleblower" as questionable, in light of his use of "junk science" to support anti-GMO activism.

=== Recipients ===
- 1999 Alexander Nikitin
- 2001 Margrit Herbst
- 2003 Daniel Ellsberg
- 2005 Theodore A. Postol and Arpad Puztai
- 2007 Brigitte Heinisch and Liv Bode, in relation with the alleged Bornavirus
- 2009 Rudolf Schmenger and Frank Wehrheim, taxation experts in the state of Hessen
- 2011 Chelsea Manning and Rainer Moormann
- 2013 Edward Snowden
- 2015 Gilles-Éric Séralini and Brandon Bryant
