= Daniel Radack =

Electrical engineer

Daniel Radack is an electrical engineer at the Institute of Defense Analyses in Kensington, Maryland. He was named a Fellow of the Institute of Electrical and Electronics Engineers (IEEE) in 2014 for his work on microwave and millimeter-wave integrated circuit technologies and packaging techniques.
