= Gerhard Scherhorn =

German professor and economist (1930–2018)

- Born: 21 February 1930; Hannover, Lower Saxony, Germany
- Died: 28 February 2018 (aged 88)
- Occupations: Professor; Economist

Gerhard Scherhorn (21 February 1930 – 28 February 2018) was a German professor and economist.

== Career ==
- Doctoral thesis on "Needs and Wants" (Bedürfnis und Bedarf) 1959
- Qualification as a university lecturer in Economics at the University of Cologne 1965
- Professor of Economics at the Academy of Economy and Policy, Hamburg, 1966-75 (Director of the Academy 1973-75)
- Professor of Consumer Economics at Hohenheim University, Stuttgart, 1975–98
- In 1993, Seghorn formed the project group "Ethical-Ecological Rating" together with Johannes Hoffmann. This resulted in 1997 in the Frankfurt-Hohenheim Leitfaden, which was the first criteriology for the ethical evaluation of companies and capital investments.
- Director, Research Group on New Models of Wealth 1996-2003, and Research Group on Sustainable Production and Consumption 2004-2005, at Wuppertal Institute for Climate, Environment, Energy
- Memberships: Council of Economic Advisors to the German Federal Government 1974-78; Advisory Council on Consumer Policy to the Federal Ministry of Economic Affairs; Board of Stiftung Warentest 1975-84; Editorial Board of Journal of Consumer Policy 1977-95; Vereinigung für Ökologische Ökonomie (VÖÖ)
- Today Professor Emeritus at Hohenheim University, and Senior Consultant at Wuppertal Institute; lives at Mannheim, Germany

== Publications (selection) ==
- Geld soll dienen, nicht herrschen. Die aufhaltsame Expansion des Finanzkapitals. Wien 2009: PicusVerlag.
- Mit Daniel Dahm: Urbane Subsistenz. Die zweite Quelle des Wohlstands. München 2008: oekom Verlag.
- Ethisches Investment. Ein Plädoyer zur Berücksichtigung ethischer Aspekte bei der Geldanlage. In: Orientierungen zur Wirtschafts- und Sozialpolitik der Ludwig Erhard-Stiftung, Heft 4/2008.
- Über Effizienz hinaus. In: Hartard, Schaffer & Giegrich (Hrsg.), Ressourceneffizienz im Kontext der Nachhaltigkeitsdebatte. Baden-Baden 2008: Nomos Verlag.
- Das Finanzkapital zwischen Gier und Verantwortung. Zeitschrift für Sozialökonomie, 45, 2008, 156./157. Folge, S. 3-13.
- Nachhaltige Entwicklung: Die besondere Verantwortung des Finanzkapitals; deutsch und englisch. Erkelenz 2008: Altius Verlag.
- Konsumentenschutz und die Theorie des Marktes. In: L.v. Rosenstiel & D. Frey (Hg.), Enzyklopädie der Psychologie, Band D III 5: Marktpsychologie, S. 643-669. Göttingen 2007: Hogrefe.
- Wo bleibt der nachhaltige Konsum? In: M. Hellwig & R. Hemker (Hg.), Jahrbuch für Nachhaltigkeit, 1, S. 5-14. Münster 2007: Ecotransfer-Verlag.
- Nachhaltige Lebensstile: Balance von Haben und Sein. In: Ch. Beck & W. Fischer (Hg.): Damit alle leben können, S. 63-82. Erkelenz 2007: Altius Verlag.
- Wirtschaftliche Leitbilder und Einstellungen. In: K. Moser (Hg.), Wirtschaftspsychologie, S. 309-336. Heidelberg 2007: Springer Medizin Verlag.
- Das Ganze der Arbeit. In: E. Lang, Chr. Busch-Lüty & J. Kopfmüller (Hg.), Wiedervorlage dringend: Ansätze für eine Ökonomie der Nachhaltigkeit, S. 98-120. München 2007: Oekom Verlag.
- Was kostet die nachhaltige Entwicklung? GAIA, 15, 2006, 94-95.
- Halbtagsgesellschaft für Nachhaltigkeit. In: C. Stahmer & A. Schaffer (Hg.), Halbtagsgesellschaft. Konkrete Utopie für eine nachhaltige Gesellschaft, S. 19-33. Baden-Baden 2006: Nomos Verlag.
- Gleiche Chancen für das Kapital. In: K. Woltron, H. Knoflacher & A. Rosik-Kölbl (Hg.). Wege in den Postkapitalismus, S. 79-94. Wien 2005: Edition Selene.
- Markt und Wettbewerb unter dem Nachhaltigkeitsziel. Zeitschrift für Umweltpolitik & Umweltrecht 28, 2005, 135-154.
- Natur und Kapital: über die Bedingungen nachhaltigen Wirtschaftens. In: Natur und Kultur, 5, 2004, S. 65-81.
- Was bewegt sich in den Wirtschaftswissenschaften?. In: P. Hennicke (Hg.): Wie kann geschehen, was geschehen muss? : Zur Umsetzung von Nachhaltigkeit; Beiträge zu einem Symposium. Wuppertal : Wuppertal Inst. für Klima Umwelt Energie 2003, S. 21-43.
- J. Hoffmann & G. Scherhorn: Saubere Gewinne: so legen Sie Ihr Geld ethisch-ökologisch an. - Freiburg 2002: Herder,.
- G. Scherhorn & Ch. Weber (Hg.): Nachhaltiger Konsum : auf dem Weg zur gesellschaftlicher Verankerung. München : Ökom-Verl., 2002.
- Die Logik der Suffizienz. In: M. Linz (Hg.): Von nichts zuviel. Suffizienz gehört zur Zukunftsfähigkeit. Wuppertal : Wuppertal Inst. für Klima Umwelt Energie 2002, S. 15-26.
- G. Scherhorn & C.H. Wilts: Schwach nachhaltig wird die Erde zerstört. In: Gaia, 10, 2001, S. 249-255.
- Nachhaltigkeit und Kapitalismus : ethische Reflexion ökonomischer Ziele. In: Günter Altner (Hg.): Ethik und Nachhaltigkeit : Grundsatzfragen und Handlungsperspektiven im universitären Agendaprozess. Frankfurt am Main 2001: VAS, S. 134-154.
- Umwelt, Arbeit und Konsum : mikroökonomische Aspekte des modernen Konsums. In: D. Rosenkranz (Hg.): Konsum : soziologische, ökonomische und psychologische Perspektiven. - Opladen 2000: Leske + Budrich, S. 283-304.
- Die produktive Verwendung der freien Zeit. In: E. Hildebrandt (Hg.): Reflexive Lebensführung : zu den sozialökologischen Folgen flexibler Arbeit. - Berlin 2000: Ed. Sigma, S. 343-377.
- L. Bakker, R. Loske & G. Scherhorn: Wirtschaft ohne Wachstumsstreben: Chaos oder Chance? Bericht über ein Forschungsprojekt. Berlin 1999: Heinrich-Böll-Stiftung (Studien & Berichte 2)
- J. Hoffmann, K. Ott & G. Scherhorn: Ethische Kriterien für die Bewertung von Unternehmen: Frankfurt-Hohenheimer Leitfaden; deutsch und englisch. Stuttgart 1997: IKO - Verl. für Interkulturelle Kommunikation.
- Das Ganze der Güter. In: K.M. Meyer-Abich (Hg.): Vom Baum der Erkenntnis zum Baum des Lebens : ganzheitliches Denken der Natur in Wissenschaft und Wirtschaft. -München 1997: Beck,. S. 162-251.
- Arbeitsplatzvernichtung und Umweltzerstörung haben die gleiche Ursache. Wuppertal : Wuppertal Inst. für Klima Umwelt Energie 1997. (Wuppertal Spezial 7)
- Güterwohlstand versus Zeitwohlstand : über die Unvereinbarkeit des materiellen und des immateriellen Produktivitätsbegriffs. In: B. Biervert (Hg.): Zeit in der Ökonomik : Perspektiven für die Theoriebildung. – Frankfurt am Main 1995: Campus, S. 147-168.
- Konsumentenverhalten und Wertewandel. In: M. Henze & G. Kaiser (Hg.): Ökologie-Dialog : Umweltmanager und Umweltschützer im Gespräch. Düsseldorf 1994: Econ, S. 196-221.
- Die Unersättlichkeit der Bedürfnisse und der kalte Stern der Knappheit. In: B. Biervert (Hg.): Das Naturverständnis der Ökonomik : Beiträge zur Ethikdebatte in den Wirtschaftswissenschaften. Frankfurt am Main 1994: Campus, S. 224-240.
- Autonomie und Empathie : die Bedeutung der Freiheit für das verantwortliche Handeln. In: B. Biervert (Hg.): Das Menschenbild der ökonomischen Theorie : zur Natur des Menschen. Frankfurt am Main 1991: Campus, S. 153-172.
- Die Funktionsfähigkeit von Konsumgütermärkten. In: M. Irle (Hg.): Marktpsychologie als Sozialwissenschaft. Göttingen 1983: Hogrefe, S. 45-150.
- Verbraucherinteresse und Verbraucherpolitik. Köln 1975: Westdeutscher Verlag.
- Gesucht: Der mündige Verbraucher. Düsseldorf 1973: Droste.
- Soziologie des Konsums. In: R. König (Hg.). Handbuch der empirischen Sozialforschung, Bd. 2, S. 834-862. Stuttgart 1969: Enke.
- Der Wettbewerb in der Erfahrungswissenschaft. In: Hamburger Jahrbuch für Wirtschafts- und Gesellschaftspolitik, 14, 1969, 63-86.
- Bedürfnis und Bedarf. Berlin 1959: Duncker & Humblot.
