= Jesselyn Radack =

American attorney

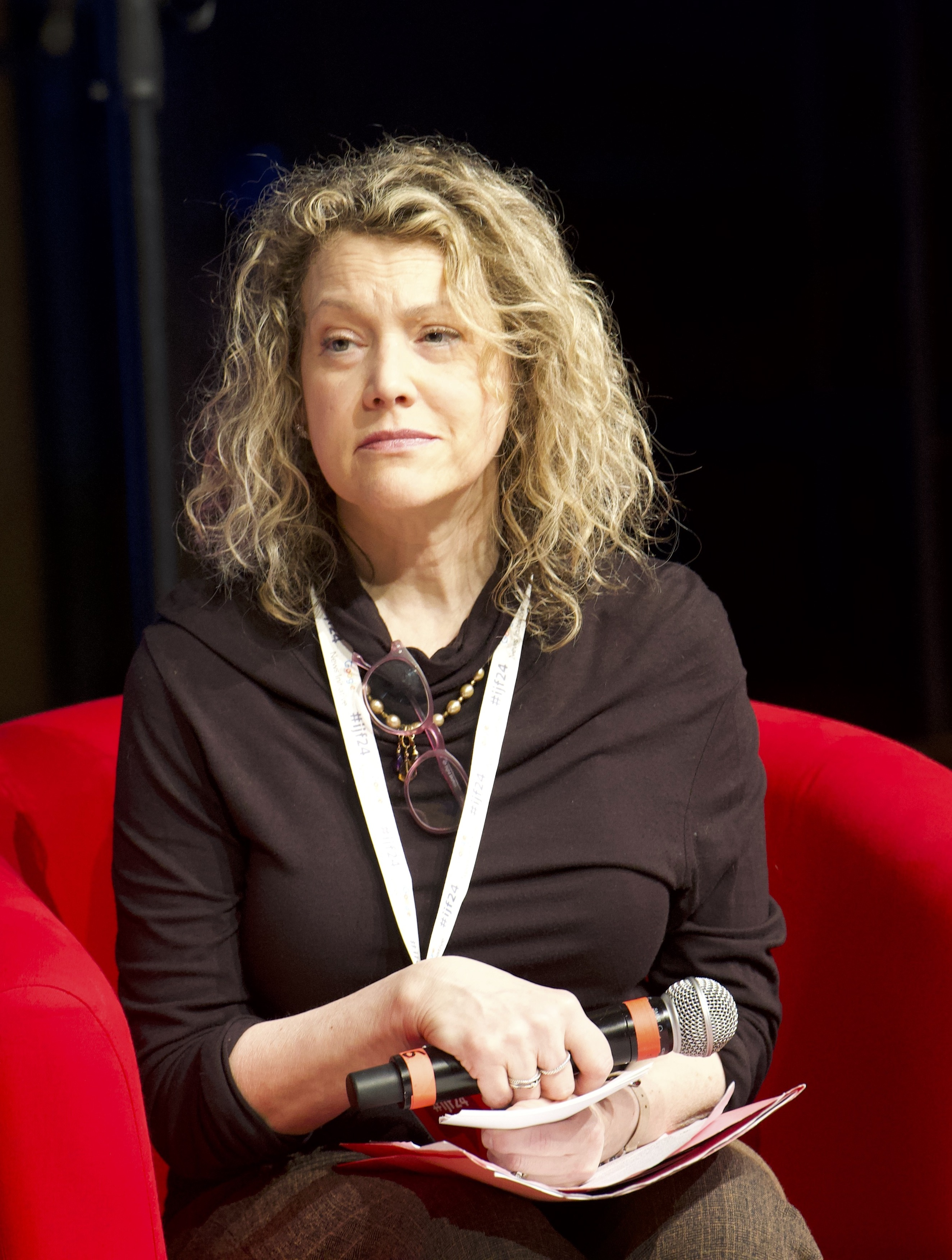
- Radack at the International Journalism Festival in 2024
- Born: Jesselyn Alicia Brown; December 12, 1970 (age 55); Washington, D.C., United States
- Education: Brown University (BA); Yale Law School (JD)
- Occupation: Attorney
- Writing career
- Notable works: Traitor: The Whistleblower and the "American Taliban"
- Notable awards: Woodrow Wilson Visiting Fellow; Foreign Policy Leading Global Thinker; Hugh M. Hefner First Amendment Award; Sam Adams Award; BuzzFlash Wings of Justice Award; Feminist Majority Foundation Feminist of the Year Award

Jesselyn Radack (born December 12, 1970) is an American national security and human rights attorney known for her defense of whistleblowers, journalists, and hacktivists. She has defended more people charged under the Espionage Act of 1917 than any attorney in U.S. history, including CIA whistleblower John Kiriakou and NSA whistleblowers Edward Snowden, Thomas Drake, and Daniel Hale. In addition, she represented a dozen CIA and Air Force whistleblowers who made disclosures about the U.S. drone program, including Brandon Bryant, Cian Westmoreland, Christopher Aaron, Michael Haas, Stephen Lewis, Heather Linebaugh, and Lisa Ling. Other notable clients include State Department whistleblower Peter van Buren and DNI whistleblower Rebecca Saltzburg.

In addition to her client work, Radack was also integral to advocacy campaigns for others prosecuted under the Espionage Act, including U.S. Army whistleblower Chelsea Manning; CIA whistleblower Jeffrey Alexander Sterling; Air Force veteran Reality Leigh Winner; and Wikileaks publisher Julian Assange.

She graduated from Wilde Lake High School, Brown University and Yale Law School, and began her career as an Honors Program attorney at the U.S. Department of Justice.

She later became a whistleblower in the Justice Department's first major terrorism prosecution after 9/11. Radack resigned in protest, and her experience is chronicled in her memoir, Traitor: The Whistleblower and the "American Taliban" and in the Emmy-nominated documentary Silenced.

After resigning from the Justice Department, Radack worked for Alan Grayson from 2006 until 2008 when he was elected to Congress. She then became the Director of National Security and Human Rights at the Government Accountability Project from 2008 until 2015, and is currently the director of the Whistleblower and Source Protection Program at the Institute for Public Accuracy. She has been widely published and quoted on the topics of whistleblowing, torture, surveillance, Internet freedom, and privacy. She is a contributing writer for Salon and her writing has appeared in The New York Times, the L.A. Times, Washington Post, the Guardian, The Nation, Legal Times, and various law journals. She appears in the press, including on the major American television networks as well as NPR, PBS, CNN, BBC, and Al Jazeera English.

== Early life and education ==
Radack was born in Washington, D.C., and attended Wilde Lake High School and Brown University. She was elected to Phi Beta Kappa in her junior year and graduated magna cum laude in 1992 as a triple major with honors in all three majors. While in college, she was diagnosed with multiple sclerosis.

In 1995 Radack graduated from Yale Law School and, through the Attorney General's Honors Program, joined the Department of Justice. When the Department's Professional Responsibility Advisory Office was created in 1999, she served as a legal advisor until leaving Justice in April 2002.

== John Walker Lindh case ==
Radack worked at the Justice Department's Professional Responsibility Advisory Office, which advises department lawyers on ethics issues. An attorney in the counterterrorism section of the Criminal Division inquired about the ethical propriety of interrogating John Walker Lindh, dubbed the "American Taliban". Lindh was captured during the United States invasion of Afghanistan. With her director's approval, she advised that such an interrogation would violate the Justice Department's ethics rule governing contact with a represented person and was not authorized by law. During this time, a photo circulated in the news of Lindh naked, blindfolded, and bound to a stretcher with duct tape. Radack considered this to be torture.

After the FBI interrogated Lindh despite her office's advice, the counterterrorism attorney sought further guidance. She and her director concluded that the FBI committed an ethics violation in their custodial interrogation of Lindh without counsel. They further advised that the fruits of Lindh's interrogation could be used for intelligence-gathering purposes, but not for criminal prosecution. When the Justice Department prosecuted Lindh against the advice of the ethics office, Radack alleged that her boss attempted to conceal the advice when the judge ordered its production.

=== Initial inquiry into Lindh case ===
On December 7, 2001, Radack received an inquiry from Justice Department counterterrorism prosecutor John DePue, regarding the ethical propriety of interrogating Lindh in Afghanistan without Lindh's legal representative being present. He told her that Lindh's father had retained a lawyer for his son; Lindh was not aware of this arrangement. Radack responded that interrogating him was not authorized by law. The principle at issue was that a person represented by a lawyer cannot be contacted by agents of the Justice Department, including the FBI, without permission of that lawyer. According to Radack, the advice she gave had been approved by Claudia Flynn, then head of PRAO, and Joan Goldfrank, a senior PRAO attorney.

The FBI proceeded to question Lindh without Lindh's lawyer having given permission. DePue informed Radack of the interrogation on December 10, 2001, and she advised him that Lindh's "interview may have to be sealed or only used for national security purposes; however, I don't have enough information yet to make that recommendation".

Radack continued to research the issue until December 20, 2001, when Flynn told her to drop the matter, because Lindh had been "Mirandized". It was later learned that the FBI agent who read Lindh the Miranda warning had, when noting the right to counsel, ad-libbed: "Of course, there are no lawyers here".

=== U.S. government statements on Lindh's legal rights ===
On January 15, 2002, five weeks after the interrogation, Attorney General John Ashcroft announced that a criminal complaint was being filed against Lindh. "The subject here is entitled to choose his own lawyer", Ashcroft said, "and to our knowledge, has not chosen a lawyer at this time". On February 5, 2002, Ashcroft announced Lindh's indictment, saying that his rights "have been carefully, scrupulously honored".

In June 2002, Newsweek published internal emails between Radack and a counterterrorism attorney in which Radack and her supervisor concluded that the FBI plans to interrogate Lindh without counsel would violate ethics guidelines and were not authorized by law. In late 2003, the Supreme Court confirmed Radack's position that U.S. citizens designated as "enemy combatants" have a right to counsel in the case Hamdi v. Rumsfeld.

In early 2005 Radack recalled her reaction to a different Ashcroft statement—that Lindh's rights had been "carefully, scrupulously guarded"—more starkly : "I knew that wasn't true".

=== Poor performance review ===
On February 4, 2002, the day before the Lindh indictment was announced, Flynn gave Radack an unscheduled, "blistering" performance evaluation, despite Radack having received a merit raise the year before. The evaluation covered December 27, 2000, to September 30, 2001, two months prior to the Lindh inquiry, and did not mention the Lindh case, but it criticized her legal judgment in issues related to the case, as well as in other matters. Flynn had not yet signed the review. She advised Radack to find another job, or the review would be put in Radack's official personnel file. Radack, who had planned on being a career civil servant, soon found a new job outside of government, at the law firm Hawkins, Delafield & Wood, from which she was effectively fired in November 2002 for refusing to either sign an affidavit stating that she had not leaked the government documents, or resign.

=== Missing emails ===
On March 7, 2002, while Radack was still working at PRAO, the lead prosecutor in the Lindh case, Randy Bellows, messaged Radack that there was a court order for all of the Justice Department's internal correspondence about Lindh's interrogation. He said that he had two of her messages and asked if there were more.

Radack immediately became concerned that the court order had been deliberately concealed from her. She had written more than a dozen emails on the subject, and neither of the ones Bellows had received copies of reflected her fear that the FBI's actions had been unethical and that Lindh's confession, which was the basis for the criminal case, might have to be sealed. After checking the hard-copy file, Radack said the files were tampered with to include only three of her emails; official records indicated that only those three emails were received by the Lindh prosecutors, but which emails DOJ supplied to the court and when cannot be determined as the court records were sealed. Radack confided in a senior colleague, former U.S. Attorney Donald McKay, who examined the file and told her that it had been "purged".

Which emails the Department of Justice supplied to the court, and when, cannot be determined directly because the court placed them under seal. In March 2003 investigative journalist Jane Mayer of The New Yorker reported that "[a]n official list compiled by the prosecution confirms that the Justice Department did not hand over Radack's most critical e-mail in which she questioned the viability of Lindh's confession until after her confrontation with Flynn".

On December 31, 2003, Radack requested the court appoint a special prosecutor to probe the alleged suppression of the emails. The government responded that it had supplied the emails to the court in its initial response to the court order seeking them, i.e., on March 1, 2002. The description of the 24 documents (probably including duplicates) provided to the court at that time matches Radack's emails, including the one that states interviewing Lindh is not authorized by law. DePue, the recipient of the emails, also had copies and states that they were submitted to the court. The judge rejected Radack's request as "impertinent".

In 2004 Radack filed suit against the government (see below). In 2005, the court found that "[t]hough Flynn informed Radack that she would send the emails to Bellows, Radack maintains that she had a 'good faith belief' that this never occurred...Radack was mistaken, for in filings submitted to the Virginia District Court on March 1, 2002, and March 11, 2002, Bellows turned over thirty-three PRAO-related documents, including Radack's fourteen emails, ex parte and under seal, for in camera review".

=== Disclosure to Newsweek of emails believed to have been purged ===
Radack resigned from the Justice Department on April 5, 2002. In June 2002 she heard a broadcast on NPR stating that the department said they had never taken the position that Lindh was entitled to counsel during his interrogation. She later wrote, "I knew this statement was not true. It also indicated to me that the Justice Department must not have turned over my e-mails to the Lindh court ... because I did not believe the Department would have the temerity to make public statements contradicted by its own court filings, even if those filings were in camera." She reasoned that "disclosure of my e-mails would advance compliance with the Lindh court's discovery order while also exposing gross mismanagement and abuse of authority by my superiors at the Justice Department." After hearing the broadcast, Radack sent the emails to Michael Isikoff, a Newsweek reporter, who had been interviewed in the NPR story. He then wrote an article about the Lindh case emails, quoting Radack but not naming her as the source of what he called "internal e-mails obtained by Newsweek".

Radack has said she did not turn the documents over to the court or prosecutors at the time she recovered them because she felt intimidated by Flynn, who had told her to drop the matter. Later, no longer working in government, she reasoned, "I couldn't go to the court because Justice Department lawyers would argue (as they did when I eventually did try to tell my story to the court) that I had no standing. I couldn't go to a Member of Congress because, as a resident of the District of Columbia, I didn't have a voting representative. What I could do is disclose my story to the press--a judicially-sanctioned way of exposing wrongdoing under the Whistleblower Protection Act of 1989, which provides protection to federal government employees who blow the whistle on what they reasonably believe evidences a violation of any law, rule, or regulation; gross mismanagement; or an abuse of authority".

Radack and some others believe her disclosure of the emails may have contributed to the plea agreement that led to a sentence of 20 years instead of possible multiple life sentences for Lindh. The plea deal was reached on July 15, 2002, a month after the Newsweek article on the emails appeared online and just hours before the hearing to consider the motions to suppress the Lindh interviews was set to begin. According to Lindh defense attorneys, the prosecution first approached them about a plea deal around the beginning of June. On June 14, the day before the emails were disclosed, and June 17, the Lindh defense filed their arguments to suppress all the interviews conducted in Afghanistan, including the ones that Radack had advised might have to be suppressed. The defense reasoning was different from Radack's; it did not assert that Lindh was represented by a lawyer at the time, which was the basis for Radack's advice in the emails.

=== Justice Department actions against Radack ===
On June 19, 2002, the Lindh court ordered the Justice Department to file a pleading "addressing whether any documents ordered protected by the Court were disclosed by any person bound by an Order of this court". The Justice Department launched a criminal investigation of Radack that remained open for 15 months. No potential criminal charge was ever specified. Radack says an agent of the Department of Justice's Office of the Inspector General (OIG) told her new employer and coworkers that she was under criminal investigation and would steal client files.

Radack believes the OIG agent pressured her employer to fire her. The firm was initially supportive, but after it obtained phone records of calls between Newsweek writer Isikoff and the firm's office showing that Radack appeared to be the leaker of government emails, that changed. A partner in the firm, which represented mainly government bond issuers, told her they could not be perceived to have an ex-government lawyer who broke confidence when she thought the client was wrong. When she continued to refuse to sign a statement that she did not leak the emails, she was placed on paid and then unpaid leave.

When Radack was granted unemployment benefits, her now-former employer was assisted by the Justice Department, she says, in challenging the benefits on the grounds of her alleged misconduct and insubordination. She won the appeal.

The Lindh court issued an order on November 6, 2002, concluding that Radack's disclosure did not violate any order of the Court, but this order was not made available to Radack until two years later.

The Department of Justice notified Radack that the criminal investigation was closed on September 11, 2003. On October 31, 2003, the Department of Justice's Office of Professional Responsibility (OPR) sent letters to the bar associations of the two jurisdictions in which she was licensed to practice law referring her for a possible ethics violation. The referrals proposed that in disclosing the emails she may have knowingly revealed information protected by attorney-client privilege. There is disagreement about whether the government or the public is the client of government attorneys. Radack bypassed that issue by invoking the Whistleblower Protection Act (WPA), which she argues provides the legal basis for an exception to attorney-client privilege, i.e., for disclosure when permitted or authorized by law. The Justice Department responded that the WPA may not apply to former employees, and that it does not authorize any disclosure, only prevents retaliatory personnel actions for certain disclosures.

Radack has contrasted the way she was treated by the Department of Justice and the way the department attorneys who authored the memos giving a purported legal basis for waterboarding and other controversial interrogation methods were treated.

The criminal investigation and subsequent ethics referrals prevented Radack from finding suitable work as an attorney for years, she says. The Maryland Bar dismissed the referral February 23, 2005. At the District of Columbia Bar, the referral was not resolved until 2011.

Radack has said that one or more anonymous Justice Department officials "smeared" her in the media as a "traitor", "turncoat", and "terrorist sympathizer" "to alienate me from all my neighbors, all my friends", sometimes specifying it was in The New York Times. In May 2003, Eric Lichtblau reported at The New York Times that "Government officials suspect she is a turncoat who leaked documents on one of their most important investigations, the John Walker Lindh case."

For a time beginning in 2003, Bruce Fein, a noted constitutional scholar and former associate deputy attorney general under Ronald Reagan, represented Radack pro bono. Rick Robinson of Fulbright & Jaworski and Mona Lyons also represented her.

=== Congressional questions ===
At a May 7, 2003, hearing of the Senate Judiciary Committee, Senator Ted Kennedy questioned Michael Chertoff, who was before the committee as a nominee for a circuit court judgeship, and who, as an Assistant Attorney General during the period in which Lindh was prosecuted, headed the Justice Department's Criminal Division. Kennedy later said that Chertoff's initial answers about Radack's case were "nonresponsive, evasive and hyper-technical" but that after follow-up questions, Chertoff provided more "direct and forthcoming" answers.

On May 22, Kennedy issued a statement saying, "Mr. Chertoff has told me that [he] has no knowledge of the facts surrounding Ms. Radack's employment, performance, or departure from the Department, and I take him at his word. Nevertheless, I remain very concerned about Ms. Radack's situation. According to press reports—and the Department has never issued any statement disputing them—Ms. Radack was in effect fired for providing legal advice on a matter involving ethical duties and civil liberties that higher-level officials at the Department disagreed with."

On May 23, by a vote of 13 to 0, the committee sent Chertoff's judicial nomination to the full Senate for confirmation. Six Democrats, however, voted "present", saying they wanted more time to review Radack's accusations.

== Whistleblower defense lawyer, after DOJ ==
In the mid-2000s, Radack served on the D.C. Bar Legal Ethics Committee and worked with the ABA Task Force on Treatment of Enemy Combatants.

=== Government Accountability Project ===
From 2009 to 2014, Radack was Homeland Security & Human Rights Director at the Government Accountability Project.

=== Institute for Public Accuracy ===
Since 2015, she has been National Security & Human Rights Director of the Whistleblower and Source Protection Program (WHISPeR) at ExposeFacts, a program of the Institute for Public Accuracy. Radack is one of the attorneys for National Security Agency whistleblower Edward Snowden. She was also one of the attorneys who represented National Security Agency whistleblower Thomas Andrews Drake, with whom she won the 2011 Sam Adams Award, given annually by the Sam Adams Associates for Integrity in Intelligence. They also both won the 2012 Hugh M. Hefner First Amendment Award. She is also the lawyer of whistleblower Brandon Bryant. Her writing has appeared in The New York Times, Wall Street Journal, Los Angeles Times, The Washington Post, The Guardian, The Nation, Salon, and various law journals. She maintains a blog at Daily Kos.

== Coverage ==
=== Literature (nonfiction) ===
She is discussed in books by Pulitzer Prize-winning journalists Charlie Savage and Eric Lichtblau, and other award-winning journalists including Jane Mayer, Eyal Press, and Kerry Howley.

=== Film ===
Radack has appeared in numerous documentaries including War on Whistleblowers: Free Press and the National Security State (2013), Silenced (2014), America's Book of Secrets (2014), National Bird (2016), United States of Secrets (2021), and Detainee 001 (2021).

=== Art ===
Ansel Adams' last protégé, Mariana Cook, photographed her for the book Justice: Faces of the Human Rights Revolution. Artist Robert Shetterly painted her for his book Americans Who Tell the Truth. British media artist Andy King created a photographed portrait of Radack using digital glich techniques. Journalist Pratap Chatterjee and political cartoonist Khalil Bendib tell her story in the graphic novel Verax: The True History of Whistleblowers, Drone Warfare, and Mass Surveillance. French cartoonist and graphic novelist Penelope Bagieu tells Radack's story via a comic strip in the book Brazen: Rebel Ladies who Rocked the World, a compilation of webcomic strips originally published on the website of Le Monde.

== See also ==
- Sibel Edmonds
- List of whistleblowers
- Whistleblower Protection Act
