= James Baker =

American lawyer and statesman (born 1930)

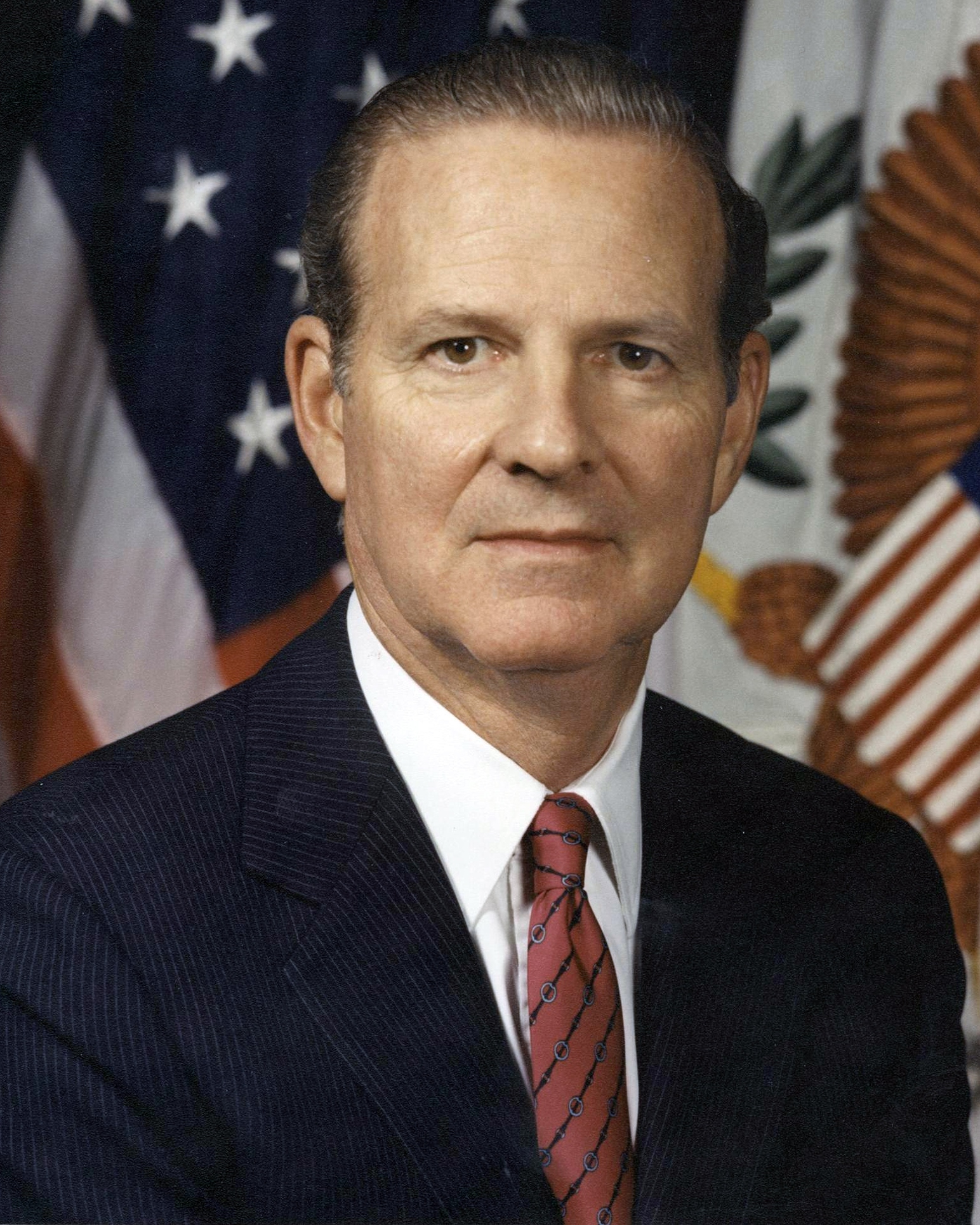
- Official portrait, 1989

10th and 16th White House Chief of Staff
- In office August 24, 1992 – January 20, 1993
- President: George H. W. Bush
- Deputy: Robert Zoellick
- Preceded by: Samuel K. Skinner
- Succeeded by: Mack McLarty
- In office January 20, 1981 – February 3, 1985
- President: Ronald Reagan
- Deputy: Michael Deaver
- Preceded by: Jack Watson
- Succeeded by: Donald Regan

61st United States Secretary of State
- In office January 25, 1989 – August 23, 1992
- President: George H. W. Bush
- Deputy: Lawrence Eagleburger
- Preceded by: George Shultz
- Succeeded by: Lawrence Eagleburger

67th United States Secretary of the Treasury
- In office February 4, 1985 – August 17, 1988
- President: Ronald Reagan
- Deputy: Richard G. Darman; M. Peter McPherson
- Preceded by: Donald Regan
- Succeeded by: Nicholas F. Brady

United States Under Secretary of Commerce
- In office August 2, 1975 – May 7, 1976
- President: Gerald Ford
- Preceded by: John K. Tabor
- Succeeded by: Edward Vetter

Personal details
- Born: James Addison Baker III; April 28, 1930 (age 96) Houston, Texas, U.S.
- Party: Republican (1970–present)
- Other political affiliations: Democratic (before 1970)
- Spouses: Mary Stuart McHenry (m. 1953; died 1970); Susan Garrett (m. 1973)
- Children: 5
- Parent: James A. Baker Jr. (father) Bonner Means Baker (mother)
- Relatives: Rosebud Baker (granddaughter)
- Education: Princeton University (BA); University of Texas, Austin (LLB)

Military service
- Allegiance: United States
- Branch/service: United States Marine Corps
- Years of service: 1952–1954 (active); 1954–1958 (reserve)
- Rank: Captain
- Unit: Marine Corps Reserve

James Addison Baker III (Note: He is actually the fourth-generation successive James Addison Baker in his family, despite using the "III" generational suffix.) (born April 28, 1930) is an American statesman, attorney, diplomat, and former Marine Corps officer. A member of the Republican Party, he served as the 10th White House chief of staff and 67th United States secretary of the treasury under President Ronald Reagan, and the 61st U.S. secretary of state, before returning as the 16th White House chief of staff under President George H. W. Bush.

Born in Houston, Texas, Baker attended the Hill School and Princeton University before serving in the United States Marine Corps. After graduating from the University of Texas School of Law, he pursued a legal career. He became a close friend of George H. W. Bush and worked for Bush's unsuccessful 1970 campaign for the United States Senate. After serving briefly as under secretary of commerce, Baker ran President Gerald Ford's failed 1976 campaign following the ouster of campaign chairman Rogers Morton. Baker considered running for the U.S. House of Representatives in Houston and did run a failed 1978 campaign for Texas attorney general, but he otherwise remained in appointed positions for his career.

Baker ran Bush's unsuccessful campaign for the 1980 Republican presidential nomination, but after Bush joined the Republican ticket under Ronald Reagan, Baker became an asset to the incoming president. Reagan appointed Baker as his White House chief of staff, and Baker remained in that position until 1985, when he became Secretary of the Treasury. As treasury secretary, he arranged the Plaza Accord and the Baker Plan. He resigned as treasury secretary, with some trepidation, to manage Bush's successful 1988 campaign for president. After the election, Bush appointed Baker to the position of secretary of state. As secretary of state, he helped oversee U.S. foreign policy during the end of the Cold War and dissolution of the Soviet Union, as well as during the Gulf War. After the Gulf War, Baker served another stint as White House chief of staff from 1992 to 1993 to help orchestrate Bush's re-election bid.

Baker remained active in business and public affairs after Bush's defeat in the 1992 presidential election. He served as a United Nations envoy to Western Sahara and as a consultant to Enron. During the Florida recount following the 2000 presidential election, he managed George W. Bush's legal team in the state. He served as the co-chairman of the Iraq Study Group, which Congress formed in 2006 to study Iraq and the ongoing Iraq War. Baker has served on the World Justice Project and the Climate Leadership Council. He is the namesake of the James A. Baker III Institute for Public Policy at Rice University. Since the death of Henry Kissinger in 2023, he is currently the oldest living former United States secretary of state, as well as the earliest serving and last surviving secretary of state to have served in the 20th century.

== Early life ==
James Addison Baker III was born at 1216 Bissonnet Street in Houston. Baker's mother, Bonner Means Baker, was a Houston socialite. His father, James A. Baker Jr, was a partner of the Houston law firm Baker Botts, which was founded by Baker's great-grandfather in 1871.

Baker's father was a strict figure who used corporal punishment, and was known as "The Warden" to Baker and his friends. He offered Baker the aphorism which Baker knew as the Five Ps: "prior preparation prevents poor performance." Baker referred to this mantra as a gift he thought about "almost every day of [his] adult life." The Warden also forbade Baker from getting involved in politics, believing that it was unseemly. Baker named his memoir Work Hard, Study...and Stay Out of Politics after this worldview, expressed by both his father and grandfather.

While Baker was growing up, his father vehemently opposed Franklin D. Roosevelt and the New Deal, believing Roosevelt a class traitor who unduly burned wealthy Americans. Despite the sentiment, Baker's father and grandfather were still Democrats in the one-party state of Texas.

Baker was born eighteen months before his only sibling, his sister Bonner Baker Moffitt. She struggled with schizophrenia and a tumultuous marriage with Houston Chronicle reporter Donald Moffitt. She died in 2015.

== Education and pre-political career ==
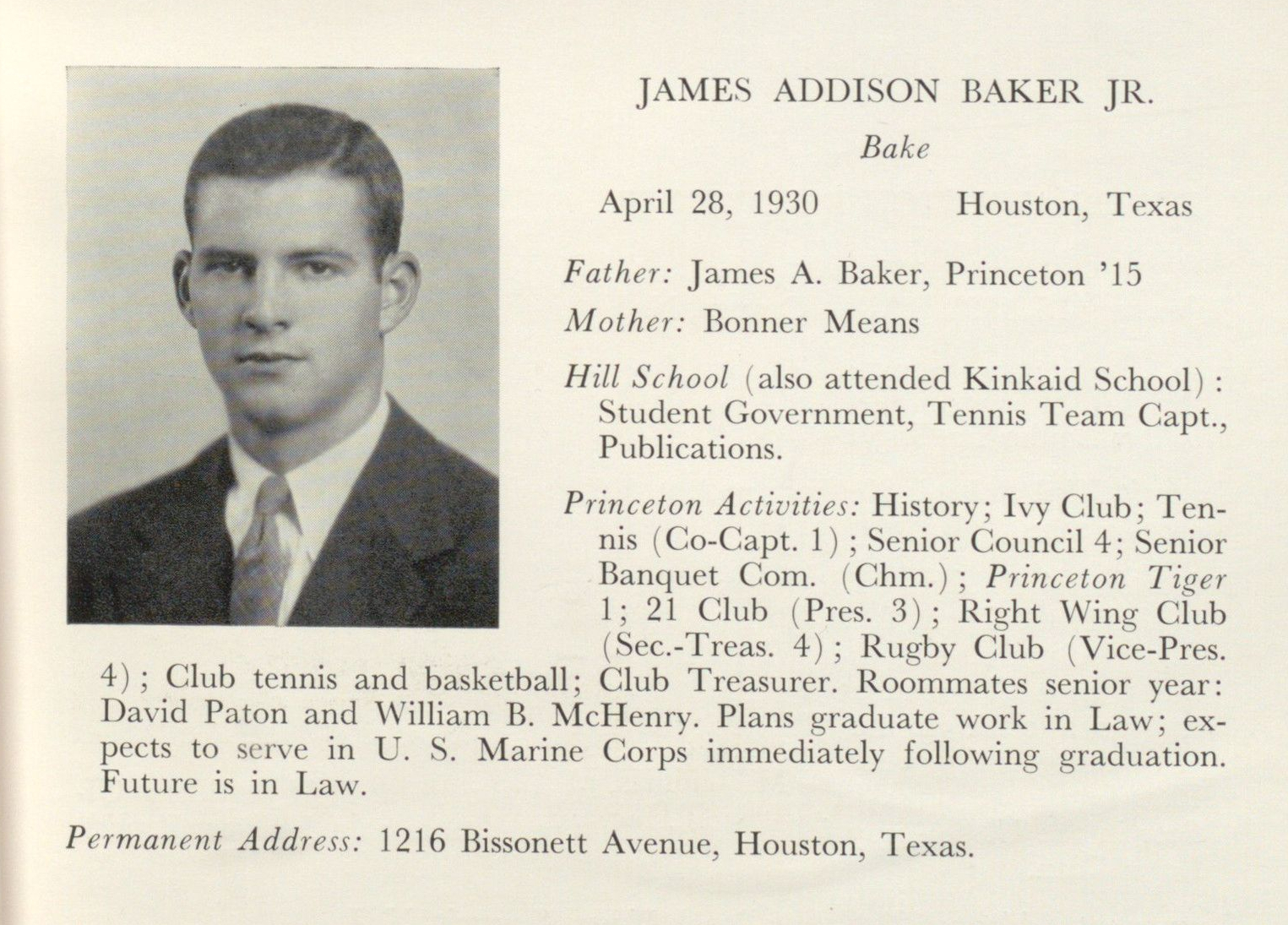
Baker in the Princeton University yearbook, 1952

Baker attended the private preparatory academy, the Kinkaid School in Houston, where his father was chairman of the board, until 1946. For his final two years of school, Baker attended the Hill School, a boarding school in Pottstown, Pennsylvania attended by his father and late uncle.

After boarding school, Baker attended Princeton University. Though his grades were middling, his father was a Princeton alumnus and wrote to the school more than a year before Baker applied to lobby for his admission. While at Princeton, Baker, by his own admission, "went wild" and joined multiple drinking societies, including the 21 Club, the Ivy Club and the "Right Wing Club" (named because members would use their right arms when drinking). In 1952, Baker completed his history degree with a 188-page senior thesis, titled "Two Sides of the Conflict: Bevin vs. Bevan," under the supervision of Walter P. Hall.

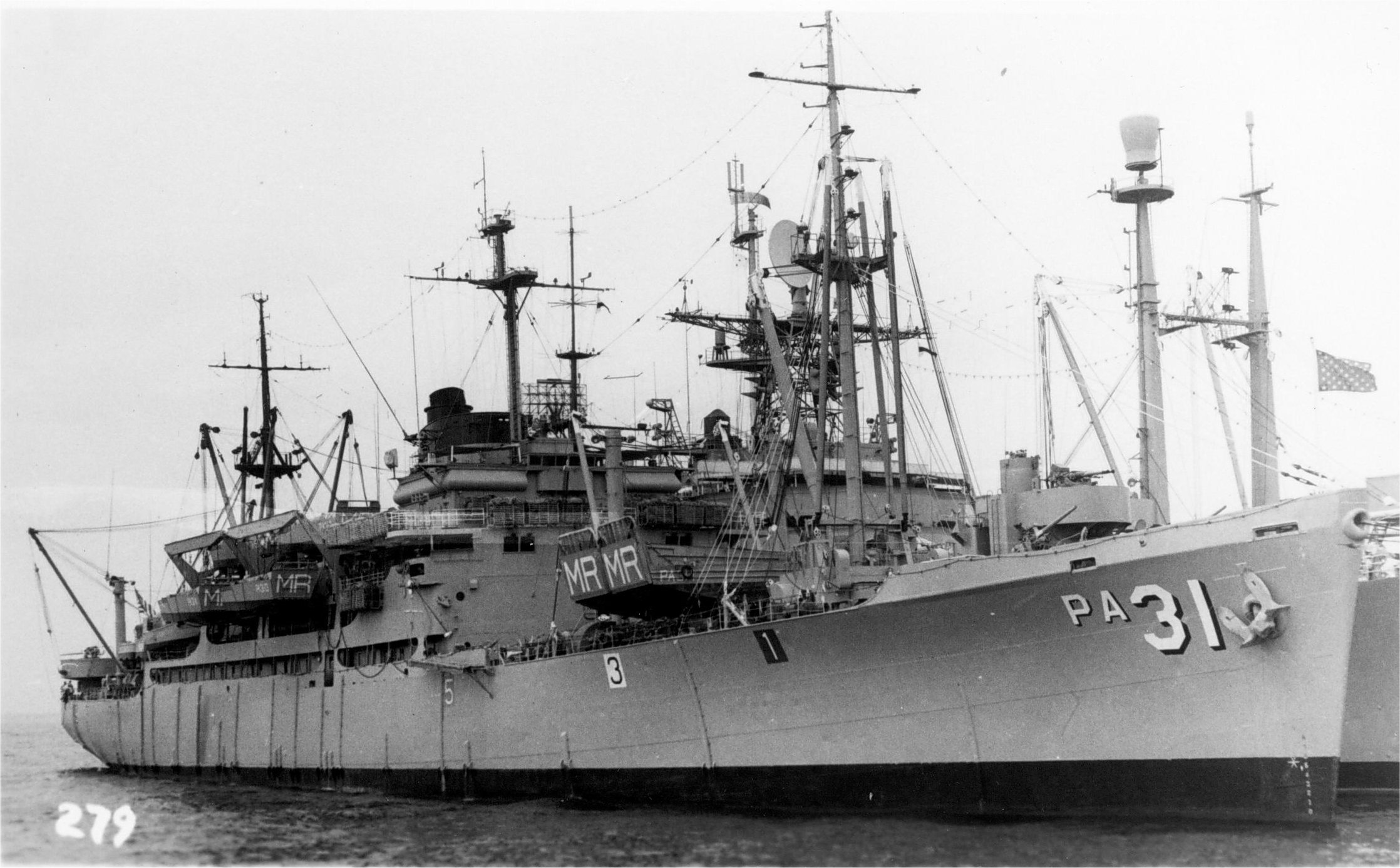
During the Korean War, Baker served for six months on the USS Monrovia (pictured) in the Mediterranean Sea.

Soon after the outset of the Korean War, while at Princeton, Baker joined a U.S. Marine officer training program to avoid being drafted before he finished college. Baker went on active duty with the Marines from his graduation in 1952 to 1954. After months of basic training, he was originally assigned to lead an infantry platoon, which may have taken him to the front in Korea. Baker instead requested to be assigned as a naval gunfire spotter. Baker received the assignment and served for six months in the Mediterranean Sea aboard the USS Monrovia as first lieutenant. Baker remained in the Marine Corps Reserve until 1958, rising to the rank of captain.

After his mandatory two years of active duty, Baker began attending the University of Texas School of Law, his father's alma mater. He considered attending law school in the northeast, but chose the University of Texas due to his family connection and greater compatibility with a Texas-based law career. At the urging of his father, he joined the Phi Delta Theta fraternity and underwent severe hazing rituals:

I went through hell. I had these young kids who were five and six years younger than I was telling me, "Sit on that ice block in burlap," and they would drop raw eggs down my throat. I did all that for my dad. He wanted me to do it.

In November 1953, while enlisted, Baker married his first wife, and had his first child soon after. While he received a dispensation from the Army under the G.I. Bill, Baker also received a monthly allowance from his father to help him support his wife and child while in school.

After law school, Baker intended to join the family firm Baker Botts, which was among the largest in the state. The firm had implemented a no-nepotism rule, which would have prevented Baker from working there while his father still did. Baker and his father requested an exception, but the partners of the firm voted against admitting Baker. After his tenure as secretary of state ended in 1993, Baker returned to Baker Botts, which had revised its rule to allow for Baker and his descendants to join.

Baker was not able to join the family firm Baker Botts due to a policy against nepotism.

From 1957 to 1980, Baker practiced law at Andrews, Kurth, Campbell, & Bradley. His work at the firm largely involved helping clients draft by-laws, advising on mergers and acquisitions, and otherwise providing guidance as needed. The firm's business primarily lay in the prosperous oil and gas trade in Texas, with its most important client being the eccentric tycoon Howard Hughes, though Baker himself never worked with Hughes in any detail. Baker's clients included Petro-Tex Chemical Corporation, Con Edison, and the oil-rich heirs of Shanghai Pierce.

While at Andrews, Kurth, Baker worked six to seven days a week and considered himself a "workaholic." He wrote in his memoir that his only significant breaks from work were for tennis—he won back-to-back doubles tournaments at the Houston Country Club with future president George H.W. Bush—and occasional hunting trips. Though he had a consistent, relatively high salary as a lawyer at a blue-chip firm, Baker's father continued to support him financially, providing money for his first house, for parts of his children's education, for Baker to buy a station wagon, and as assistance in the construction of a new house.

When Baker wanted to buy a parcel of poorly developed South Texas land in 1968, his father refused to put up his money, feeling that the property offered little value. Since Baker's father was, at that point, struggling with Parkinson's disease, his mother granted Baker the money over his father's objections. Baker named the land "Rockpile Ranch" in deference to his father's doubts.

== Early political career ==
In his twenties and thirties, while working at Andrews Kurth, Baker considered himself apolitical. He was a registered Democrat in one-party Texas, but he wrote in the memoir that he consistently voted for the Republican presidential candidate. Baker attended the first inauguration of Dwight D. Eisenhower after receiving tickets while training at Quantico.

Baker's first wife, the former Mary Stuart McHenry, was active in the Republican Party, coming from a family of Ohio Republicans. After their marriage, she continued to act as a Republican booster, supporting the Congressional campaigns of George H. W. Bush. In addition, Baker's growing closeness with his tennis partner Bush and his conservative father—who supported Bush's father's political career and donated to Bush's first campaigns—influenced Baker's political preferences.

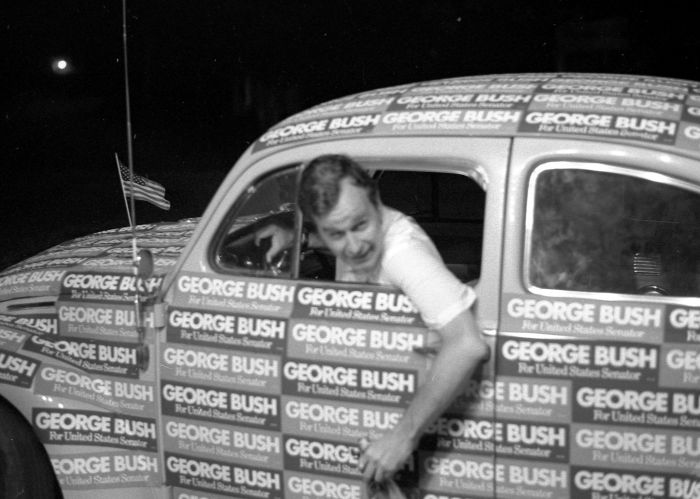
In his first foray into electoral politics, Baker helped his friend George H.W. Bush (pictured) run for the Senate in Texas.

Baker supported Bush socially during his failed 1964 Senate campaign against Ralph Yarborough and in his successive successful House campaigns, but not actively. In the lead-up to the 1970 Senate campaign, Bush decided to forgo re-election for the House of Representatives—due to Texas's resign-to-run statute—to run again for the Senate against Yarborough. Bush encouraged Baker to run as his replacement in the House. Baker strongly considered the opportunity for some weeks, since he had grown bored with routine and would have an almost certain safe seat. He decided not to run to avoid campaigning as his wife's cancer grew worse. She died in February 1970, shortly after Baker decided not to run.

In the aftermath of her death, Bush encouraged him to assist in the Senate campaign. Baker chaired Bush's operation in Harris County, fundraising and coordinating support. Bush lost in 1970 to conservative Democrat Lloyd Bentsen—who had defeated the more liberal Yarborough in the Democratic primary—53 percent to Bush's 47 percent.

During and after the campaign, Baker continued to work at Andrews Kurth as he reoriented his family life following his wife's passing. By the time of Richard Nixon's re-election campaign in 1972, Baker returned to politics as Finance Chair for Texas. After Nixon's victory, he considered multiple appointments. Bush lobbied Texas Senator John Tower to submit Baker for nomination to the Fifth Circuit Court of Appeals. Though that effort failed, Baker considered joining the executive branch with a scheduled interview for the same day as the sudden departures of John Dean, H.R. Haldeman, and John Ehrlichman in 1973. He received and rejected an offer to be the assistant administrator of the Environmental Protection Agency, due to the continuing Watergate scandal.

== Ford administration (1975–1976) ==
Baker continued to work at Andrews Kurth before he received an appointment as under secretary of commerce under Rogers Morton. Morton chose Baker after a trip to China, where he spoke with Bush—then the U.S. ambassador to China—who strongly recommended Baker for the role. Baker was confirmed by the Senate in August 1975.

=== Under secretary of commerce ===
In the role, Baker attended the White House as the department representative in discussions surrounding the economy. He was a key figure in pushing for protectionist policy toward Chinese textiles, over the objections of Secretary of State Henry Kissinger. In a campaign event in Oklahoma during Ford's primary campaign against Ronald Reagan, Baker caused a mild controversy when he declared to anti-Kissinger conservatives that Ford would replace him should he win re-election. White House Chief of Staff Dick Cheney sternly reprimanded Baker, who apologized to Kissinger.

Baker was an occasional resource for political judgment in the campaign, including in the lead-up to Ford's loss to Reagan in the Texas primary. After the untimely death of political operative Jack Stiles, Morton—who was then running Ford's campaign—appointed Baker to be Ford's "delegate wrangler" during the 1976 Republican National Convention.

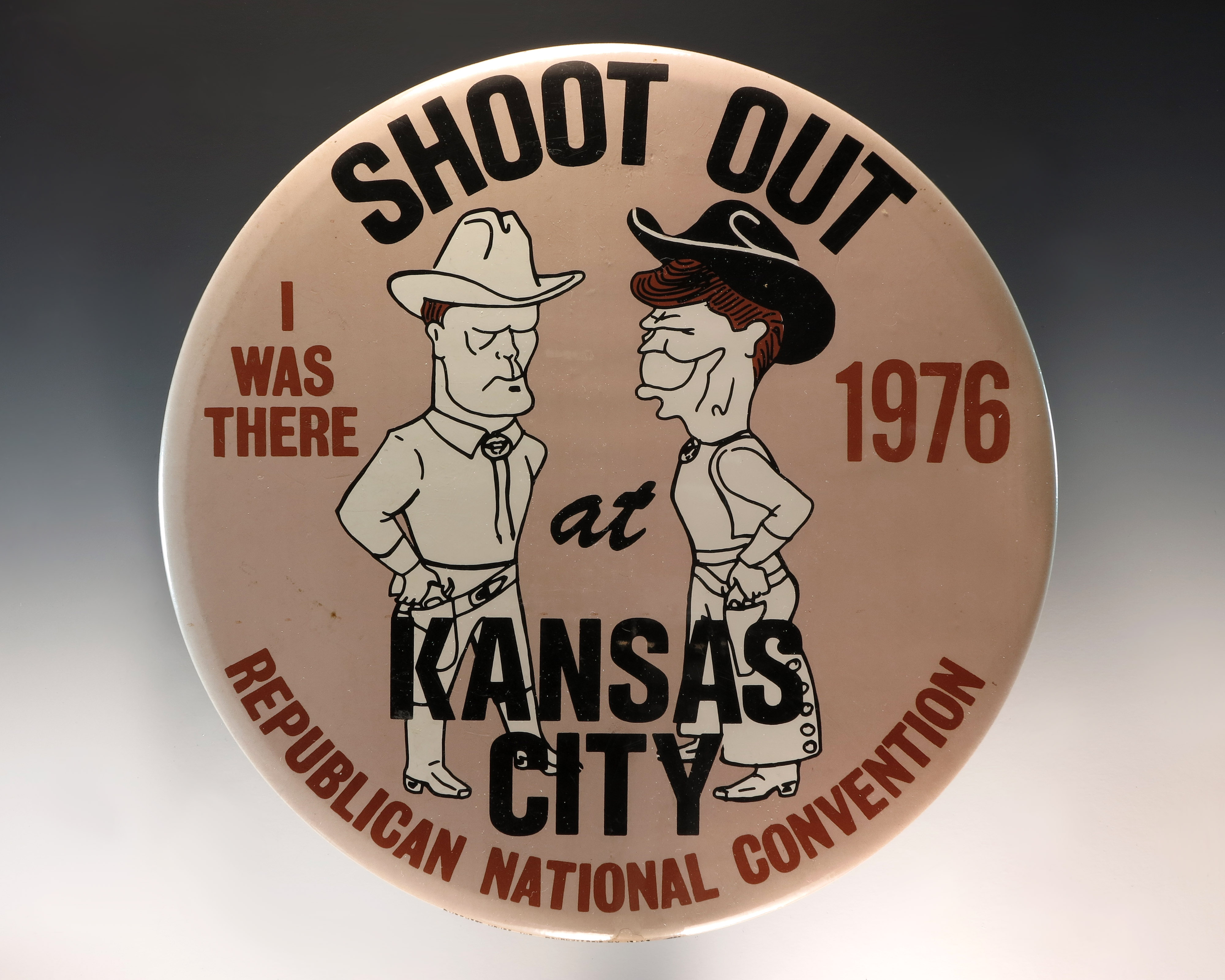
Baker led the floor fight at the 1976 Republican National Convention for Ford, which this campaign button depicts.

In Kansas City, Baker and his team narrowly won the floor fight for Ford, with the count of 1,187 to 1,070. According to his biographers, among Baker's strengths in the role were consistently accurate delegate estimates, especially compared to the fluctuating numbers offered by Reagan's representative, John Sears. Baker was hailed in a profile by The New York Times as a "Miracle Man." His floor team included future campaign manager Paul Manafort.

=== Ford 1976 campaign chairman ===
Shortly after the convention, Baker replaced Morton as campaign chairman. Morton departed after publicly criticizing Ford's prospects following the Reagan challenge. Cheney and political consultant Stuart Spencer chose Baker partly due to his success at the convention and the belief, as Cheney put it to Newsweek, that he had the energy to "take a dead organization and turn it around." Morton's wife had requested that Baker reject the promotion to reduce her husband's embarrassment, but Baker did not. He told his biographers that taking over in those circumstances was one of the "toughest' moments in his political career.

Among Baker's strategies in the campaign was the decision to agree to the first televised presidential debates since the 1960 election. Ford and Democratic nominee Jimmy Carter met for three debates. Though polling indicated that Ford fared well in the first debate, he fared poorly in the second debate, partly due to a gaffe where he claimed that there was "no Soviet domination of Eastern Europe and there never will be under a Ford administration." Televised debates have been held in each of the subsequent American presidential elections.

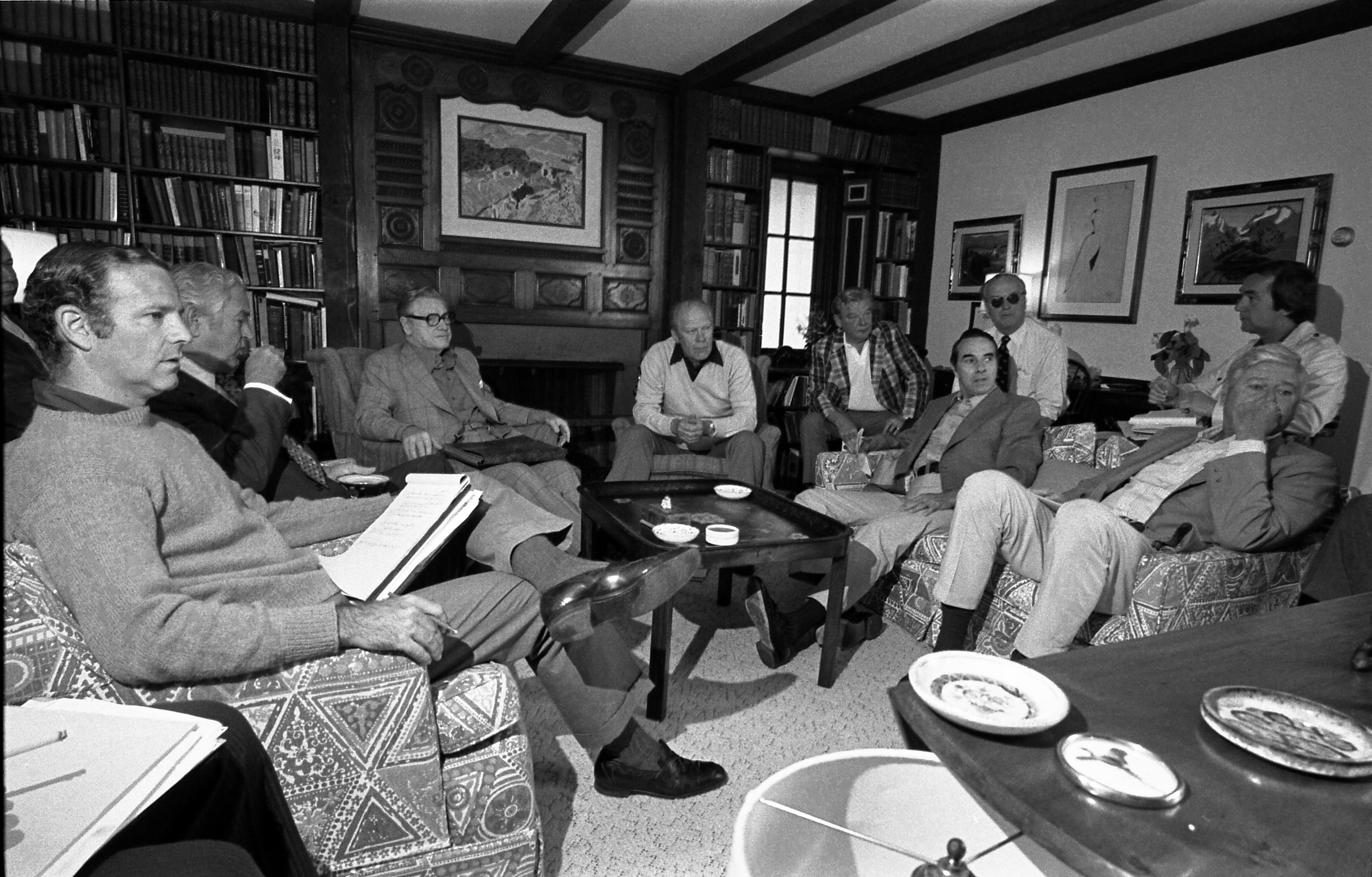
Baker (left) participated in a 1976 campaign strategy session with President Gerald Ford (fourth from left) and others in Vail, Colorado.

In the days before the election, Baker controversially wrote to black clergymen to call attention to provocateur Clennon King's criticism of Carter, an integrationist, for the de facto segregation of his Plains, Georgia church. Ford denounced the action internally as an apparent dirty trick he would disavow. It also strengthened the connection Baker had tried to sever between Carter and black supporters, as prominent figures such as Jesse Jackson and Coretta Scott King rallied to support him.

Ford lost the popular vote to Carter by two percentage points and fell in the electoral college by small margins in two states. Despite the defeat, Baker received credit for improving Ford's chances and for closing the deficit, which was as large as 13 percent when Baker began. Other members of Ford's campaign team, including Stuart Spencer, strongly criticized Baker for failing to spend all of the campaign funds ($21.8 million) allotted to each of the candidates. Baker had declined to spend the surplus money (about $1 million) for concerns about encroaching on post-Watergate propriety.

== Candidacy for Texas attorney general (1978) ==
After the 1976 election, Baker returned to Andrews Kurth, but he intended to re-enter politics. In a conversation with his friend George H.W. Bush, he asked for advice about running for state office in Texas. Bush recommended challenging Governor Dolph Briscoe, but Baker decided to run for Attorney General, expecting to face Price Daniel Jr., son of the former governor and descendant of Sam Houston. Baker concluded that Daniel would be an easier candidate to defeat than Briscoe, as a pedigreed liberal in a state that was shifting toward conservative Republicans like Reagan.

Daniel ran for the Democratic primary, but lost to former Texas Secretary of State Mark White by 4 percentage points. Baker himself ran unopposed in his primary.

In the general election, Baker ran as a moderate, telling advocacy group LULAC that he would support civil rights protections, even as Republican nominee for governor, Bill Clements, did not. Baker did maintain the Republican orthodoxy on preventing taxpayer-funding of abortions, instituting harsher mandatory sentences for some criminals, and supporting the death penalty. National Republicans, including Reagan, Ford, and 1976 Vice Presidential nominee Bob Dole, campaigned on Baker's behalf in the race.

Baker ran on the slogan "Texas needs a lawyer, not a politician, for attorney general." The Houston Chronicle political reporter Jim Barlow, who led the Chronicle's coverage of the race, told Baker's biographers that "he was the worst retail politician" that he had encountered over a 15-year career. The Chronicle editorial page endorsed White over Baker, leading Baker to resent his hometown newspaper.

Baker lost the Attorney General race to White with an 11-point deficit. In the same year, Clements defeated Democratic governor nominee John Hill, becoming the first Republican to be elected Texas governor since the Reconstruction era. Republican Senator John Tower also defeated Democratic challenger, Bob Krueger.

== 1980 presidential election ==
Bush, who was serving as chairman of the First International Bank following the end of the Ford presidency, requested Baker's help in running for the Republican presidential nomination in 1980. As early as December 1978, Baker had already checked with former President Ford to confirm that Ford would not seek the nomination himself, to prevent any conflicts for Baker as Ford's previous campaign manager. Baker and Bush also spoke with Reagan, a previous high performer in the Republican primaries, to inform him of their intention to run.

=== Bush 1980 presidential primary campaign ===
Baker and Bush chose a strategy for the primaries that then-incumbent Carter pioneered in his 1976 campaign. To compete with party heavyweights like Reagan and former Texas governor John Connally, Baker's argued that the campaign would need a superior organizations, arguing that "primary elections are won by organization!—almost regardless of candidate."

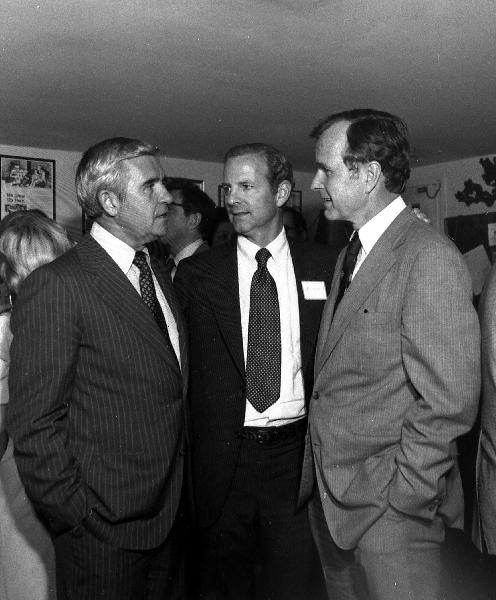
Reagan campaign operative Senator Paul Laxalt (left) speaks with Baker (center) and George Bush during Bush's 1980 campaign for the Republican nomination.

Baker and Bush's campaign strategy resulted in a Bush victory over Reagan in the Iowa race, 31.6 percent to 29.5 percent. Bush lost significantly in the New Hampshire primary—Reagan's 50.2 percent to Bush's 23—following the victory in Iowa. In that primary contest, Bush and Baker engaged in a controversial debate performance hosted by the Nashua Telegraph that hurt his electoral prospects.

Over the successive months, Baker led the Bush campaign to a handful of victories, including in Pennsylvania, Massachusetts, and Maine. Despite some success, Baker felt Bush was unlikely to defeat Reagan. Without conferring with his candidate, Baker hinted to The Washington Post in early June that Bush would soon wind down his campaign. When they eventually met in Texas to discuss prospects going forward, Baker encouraged Bush to end his campaign, arguing that they lacked funds and that continuing would jeopardize the possibility of Reagan naming him vice president nominee. Bush did not want to abandon his organization, and expressed ambivalence toward the vice presidency, but he acceded to Baker's advice to end his campaign.

=== Reagan campaign ===
In the months between Bush's withdrawal and the 1980 Republican National Convention, Baker lobbied the Reagan campaign to choose Bush as vice presidential nominee in the name of party unity. Despite misgivings over his "Voodoo economics" criticism and moderately pro-choice views, Reagan eventually picked Bush for the nomination. Baker was offered, but rejected, the chance to run Bush's vice presidential campaign, feeling it was below him. Instead, he worked on the Reagan campaign in managing the debates.

As debate negotiator, Baker worked with Democrat Robert Strauss and the League of Women Voters to decide how many debates to hold and when. Though there were three debates scheduled, only the last featured Carter and Reagan on the same stage. In his memoir, Carter advisor Stuart Eizenstat credited Baker as "outfox[ing]" the Carter camp in scheduling the debate so soon before the election, leaving little potential for damage control.

==== Debategate ====
In 1983, Baker faced controversy, known as "Debategate," upon the revelation that Baker's debate team had received a binder with Carter's debate preparation and strategy. In a letter Baker wrote to Congressman Donald Albosta, he claimed:

It is my recollection that I was given the book by [Reagan campaign chairman] William Casey with the suggestion that it might be of use to the debate briefing team. [...] It is correct that, after seeing the book, I did not undertake to find out how our campaign had obtained it.

Casey denied Baker's recollection, but Congressional investigators found Baker's explanation to be more credible. Whether Baker's use of the Carter briefing books has itself been a matter of debate. Though the book was used by Reagan's opponent in the mock preparatory debate as a reference, Baker claimed to his biographers that they weren't "worth a damn." Carter himself remained convinced that his material had been unethically used against him in the debate, but felt that Baker's upright reputation excused him from any of Carter's ill will.

== White House chief of staff (1981–1985) ==
On October 29, 1980, the night after Reagan's successful performance in the debate, Reagan campaign consultant Stuart Spencer proposed to Reagan that Baker should be his chief of staff, should he win. Supported by Nancy Reagan and Reagan aide Michael Deaver, Spencer felt that Baker would be a less provocative choice than hardliner Edwin Meese, who had worked with Reagan throughout his campaigns and governorship. Reagan agreed, announcing Baker as his choice the morning after his election victory.

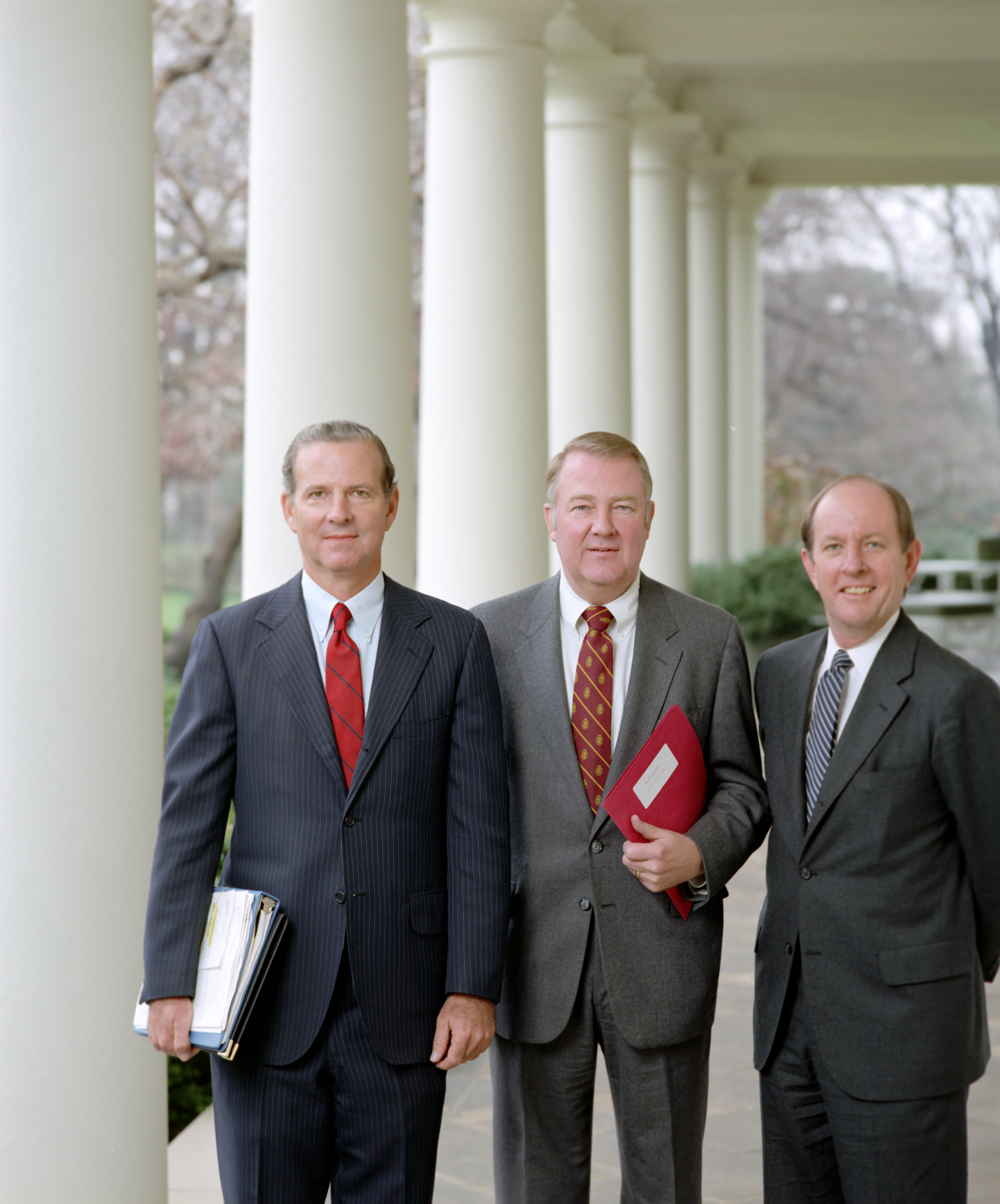
"The Troika" (from left to right): Chief of Staff James Baker, Counselor to the President Ed Meese, and Deputy Chief of Staff Michael Deaver at the White House, December 2, 1981

=== The Troika ===
Shortly after the election, Baker and Meese met to arrange their division of responsibilities. chief of staff in an informal agreement that has been referred to as the Troika: Baker would be chief of staff, in charge of day-to-day issues of access to the president and negotiations; Meese would be counselor to the president, in charge of directing policy and long-term initiatives; With Deaver, who would be in charge of the administration's image, they made up "The Troika" of senior White House officials.

The Troika, under Baker's guidance, significantly restricted automatic access to Reagan to only family, Bush, and certain White House support staff. Other callers would have to receive Troika approval. Among other influences, the Troika had effective veto power over hiring and firing. Though Reagan was the ultimate decider, he only acted on unanimous consent from the Troika, often preferring not to fire people if possible.

Despite the power-sharing principle behind the Troika, Baker is considered to have had a high degree of influence over the first Reagan administration. Reagan biographer Max Boot argued that the arrangement let Baker "run circles around Meese," whom Baker privately derided as "Pillsbury Doughboy." Lou Cannon, who covered the administration for The Washington Post, referred to Baker as being the "key" to the proper functioning of the Troika. Ford and Bush advisor Brent Scowcroft referred to Baker as "co-president, in a way," under Reagan. In 1992, Washington Post columnist Marjorie Williams referred to Baker as "the most powerful [chief of staff] in political memory."

=== Reagan assassination attempt ===
In March 1981, John Hinckley tried to shoot Reagan while he was leaving an AFL-CIO conference in Washington. Baker was not in his entourage, and learned of the shooting as Reagan was in the hospital. Baker and Meese joined Deaver at the hospital, where Reagan was in critical condition. Baker, Meese, and White House Political Director Lyn Nofziger decided amongst themselves whether to use the provisions of the Twenty-Fifth Amendment to make Bush the acting president while Reagan's status was in flux. The group of advisors decided, without asking Bush, to avoid any temporary transition. Baker himself worried that such an action would feed into conservatives' existing distrust toward both him and Bush. With Baker's authorization, his deputy Richard Darman actively stopped White House discussion—by White House Counsel Fred Fielding and Secretary of State Alexander Haig, among others—of any transition by taking the transition documents they had drafted and putting it in his office safe. According to his biographers, Baker consciously restricted access to Reagan during his recovery period, fearing that it would cast doubts on his overall competence if the country knew his poor health in the immediate aftermath.

==== Conservative criticism ====
Members of the conservative movement publicly criticized Baker for his support of Sandra Day O'Connor and apparent inaction on conservative priorities. In the spring of 1982, Baker confronted conservative writer Robert Novak for the negative coverage he felt he received over multiple Evans & Novak columns. Shortly after Baker's outburst at Novak, long-time Reagan booster Clymer Wright of Houston wrote a letter to Republicans in an unsuccessful effort to convince Reagan to dismiss Baker. Wright claimed that Baker, a former Democrat and a Bush political intimate, was a "usurper" who undermined conservative initiatives in the administration.

Reagan directly rejected Wright's request in a letter at Baker's request. Reagan wrote that he himself was in charge and that Baker was following Reagan's own initiative. Despite the rebuttal, conservatives continued to distrust Baker. Former administration official Lyn Nofziger wrote a letter to conservative Republicans in late 1982 to express concern that the 1984 race would be a "Bush-Reagan," rather than a "Reagan-Bush," campaign. Baker and Reagan both called Nofziger directly to ask him to retract the sentiment. In January 1983, Interior Secretary James G. Watt pioneered the slogan "Let Reagan be Reagan," a barb about Baker and Bush, which became a common refrain among activists and columnists.

Three years into the administration, Baker became heavily dispirited and tired due to the weight of his job; according to his wife, Baker was "so anxious to get out of [his job]" that he gave some consideration to the prospect of becoming commissioner of baseball. Despite having no strong baseball fandom, Baker reached the last level of consideration to replace Bowie Kuhn before losing out to Peter Ueberroth. Reagan offered to appoint Baker as secretary of transportation in 1983, but Baker believed that his rival Meese had pushed the plan. At Bush's suggestion, he also strongly considered trying to become CIA director. In 1983, some Texas legislators attempted to draft Baker to run for the Senate seat that would open following John Tower's retirement, but Baker declined what he felt might be a demotion in power.

==== National Security Advisor ====
In October 1983, Baker attempted to replace William Clark as National Security Advisor. Clark left for the Interior Department, partly out of feeling frustrated by what he perceived as Baker, Deaver, and Nancy Reagan's undue influence over the president. Baker planned for Deaver to be his replacement as chief of staff. Reagan initially agreed to the arrangement and had a drafted press release announcing the change. According to his biographers, Baker agreed that Reagan should inform the National Security Council before a press announcement, but did not attend the meeting himself.

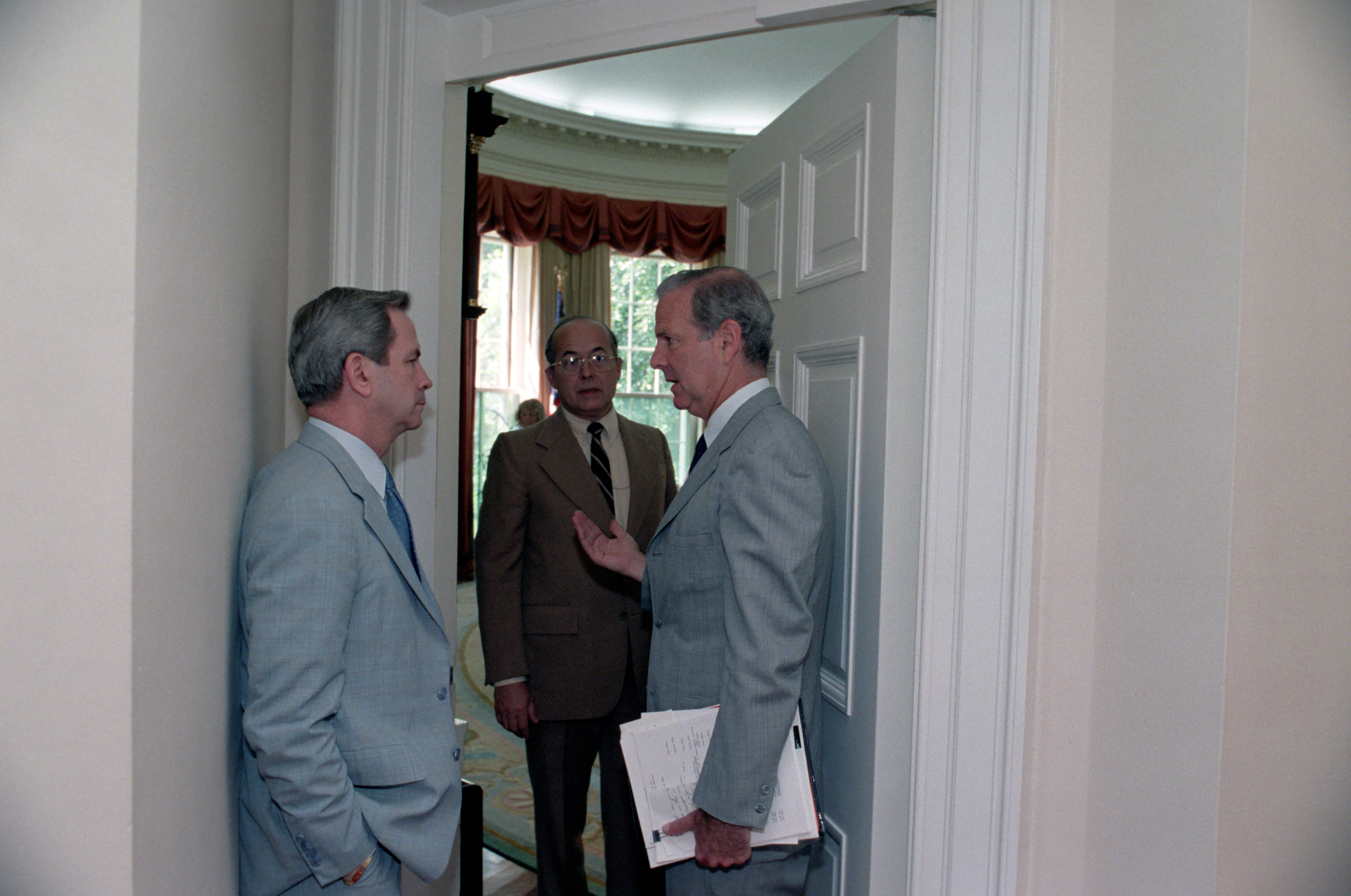
Baker (right) speaking with National Security Advisor Robert McFarlane (left) and John Poindexter

After a long lunch with Baker ally George Shultz, Reagan was late to the NSC meeting, so Clark came up to the Oval Office to retrieve him. Upon seeing the press release announcing the changes, Clark organized the NSC's conservative bloc— Clark, Meese, Casey, Weinberger—to reject the reshuffle.

The conservative bloc wanted to appoint UN Ambassador Jeane Kirkpatrick, an anti-Soviet hardliner, as Clark's replacement instead. Baker, Deaver, and Shultz rallied to reject Kirkpatrick as unacceptably extreme. Reagan eventually chose Robert McFarlane, who was later convicted of crimes stemming from the Iran-Contra affair, as Clark's replacement. In his memoir, Reagan referred to the decision not to appoint Baker as a "turning point" in his presidency.

=== 1984 campaign ===
Baker began to plan Reagan's expected re-election bid beginning in the autumn of 1982. Though Reagan did not officially announce his campaign until late January 1984—which the planning committee itself decided—Baker and his informal group—which included Deaver, Stuart Spencer, and Republican pollster Robert Teeter—believed his candidacy was a foregone conclusion. The meetings ran weekly in the Madison Hotel until late 1983.

As chief of staff, Baker was not officially in charge of the campaign operations, but exerted extensive power over it. As such, Baker conflicted repeatedly with Senator Paul Laxalt, who was the official 1984 campaign chairman. Baker informally chose Laxalt's deputy, campaign manager Ed Rollins, and the question of who Rollins reported to spurred some minor internecine conflicts. Early in the campaign, Laxalt directly complained to Reagan that Baker had assumed de facto control over the campaign. Reagan confirmed Laxalt's authority, leading to Baker accusing Rollins of "sandbagging" him in the campaign. Laxalt also dismissed Baker as "the hired help" when they were at odds over campaign direction.

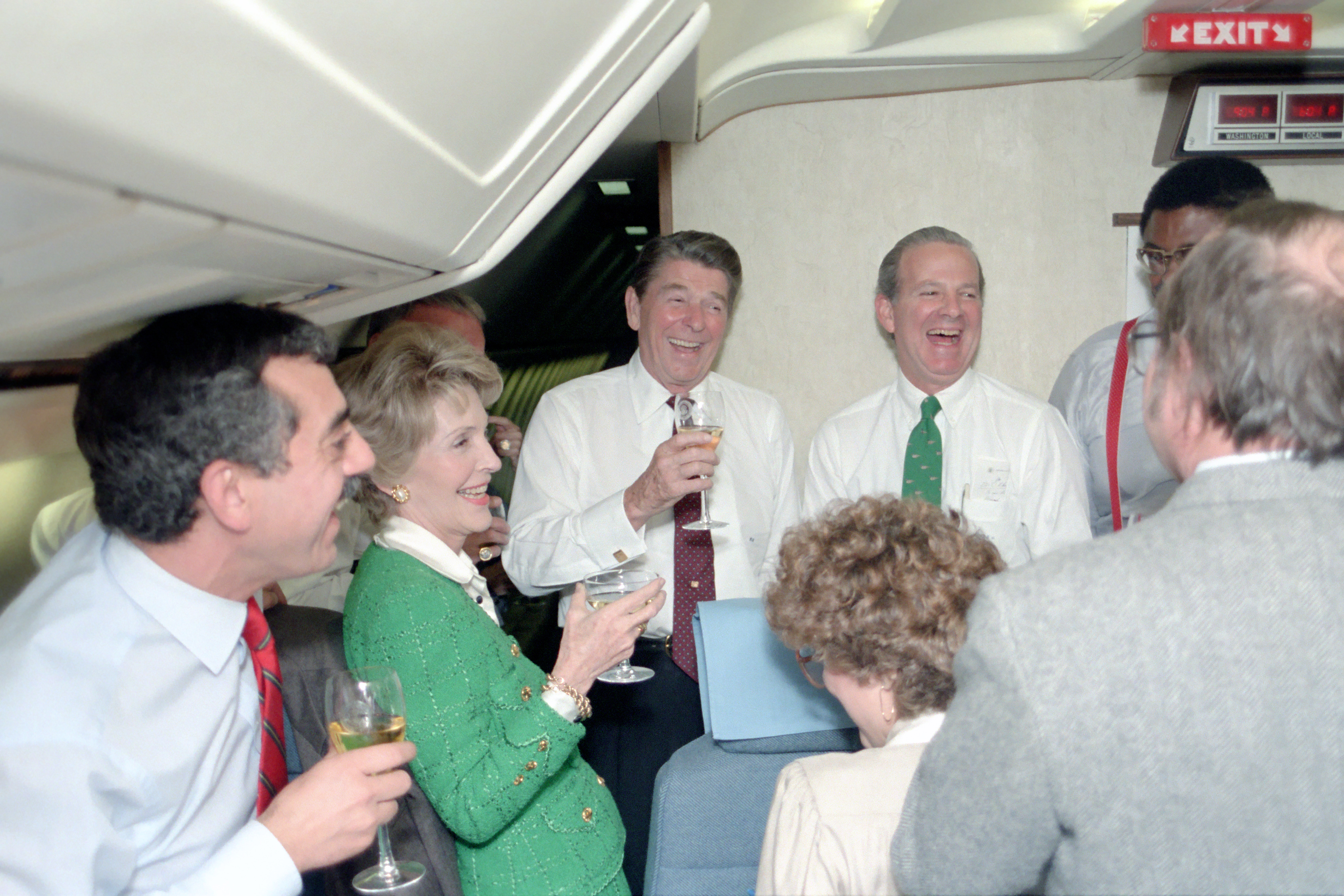
Baker (third from right) and Reagan (third from left) on Air Force One, celebrating at the end of the president's successful re-election campaign

During the campaign, Baker continued to work as a member of the cadre of senior advisors with his deputy Darman, Spencer, Deaver, Stockman, Rollins, and Laxalt. Baker received credit for empowering conservative Republicans of the New Right—led by Representative Newt Gingrich—to decide much of the 1984 party platform, believing that Reagan would run on his actions as president more than specific policy proposals. Baker and Spencer did reject an attempt by platform-drafters to forswear any future tax hikes. Instead, they had Reagan make his stance not that he would promise not to raise taxes, only that he had "no plans" to raise taxes. The latter would allow Reagan to avoid upsetting anti-tax conservatives while allowing that taxes could be necessary to reach a balanced budget without major cuts to Medicare or Social Security. Reagan won the election with a record 525 electoral votes total (of a possible 538), and received 58.8% of the popular vote to Walter Mondale's 40.6%.

The campaign overall was optimistic about its chances throughout the process. A widely shared sentiment among Baker and senior aides was the one expressed by Stuart Spencer, that their goal was not to "screw up" their otherwise excellent chances. Baker himself earned praise for minimizing campaign conflicts by directing conflicting aides toward Rollins, who would then adjudicate disputes before they boiled over. Unlike the 1976 and 1980 campaigns that Baker was involved in, there were no major staffing changes throughout the Republican campaign.

== Secretary of the treasury (1985–1988) ==
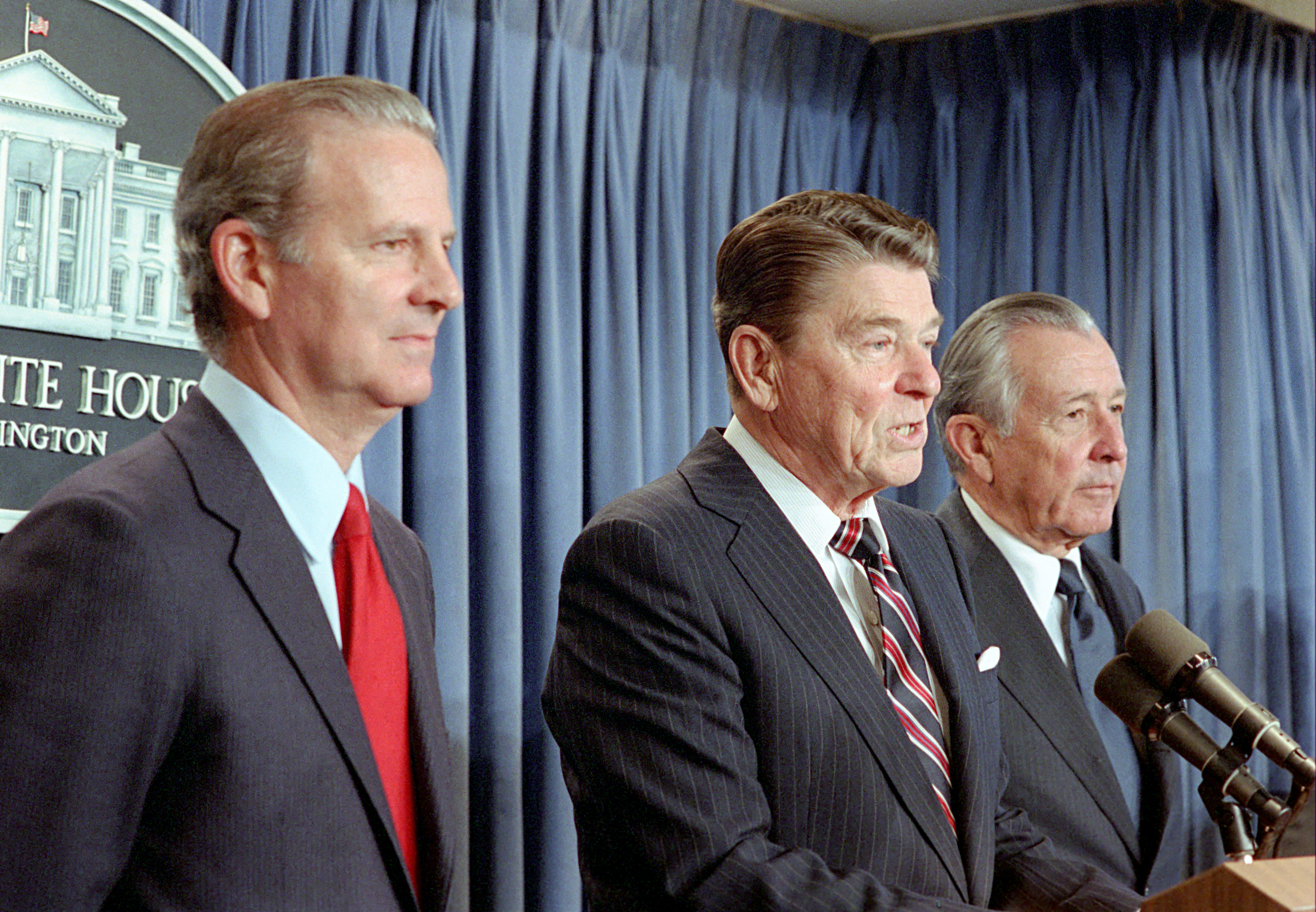
President Ronald Reagan announcing the nomination of James Baker as secretary of the treasury and the appointment of Donald Regan as White House chief of staff on January 8, 1985, a job-swap to which both Baker and Regan agreed

In 1985, Reagan named Baker as United States secretary of the Treasury, in a job-swap with then-Secretary Donald Regan, a former Merrill Lynch executive who became chief of staff. Regan suggested the change to Baker, feeling that the White House position would grant him greater power. For his part, Baker relished the prestige of the Treasury Department, and considered it a "stepping stone" to further prominence. Reagan had little role in the plan, immediately approving it after his appointees suggested it.

Baker's departure from the White House came at the same time as others from Reagan's first term, including Meese, Deaver, Stockman, Rollins, and Baker's deputy Darman, who went with him to the Treasury Department. Baker's departure in particular marked a "turning point" in Reagan's presidency, according to Reagan biographer Lou Cannon. After Regan replaced Baker, administration "blunders [became] more frequent and damage control [was] lacking." Baker was confirmed as secretary of the Treasury on January 29, 1985, with a unanimous 95–0 vote in the Senate.

Baker brought his long-time aide Darman to the Treasury Department as deputy secretary of the Treasury. Darman was considered to be essential to Baker's agenda, as a detail-oriented and aggressive complement to Baker's more political style. According to Wall Street Journal reporters Alan S. Murray and Jeffrey Birnbaum, stakeholders considered the Baker tenure to really be the Baker-Darman Treasury, with "Darmanesque" tactics representing anything particularly "sneaky and conniving." Darman chafed at the outsized credit Baker received, and resented being known as a "Baker aide" rather than his own entity.

Baker's signature, which was featured on U.S. currency from his confirmation as treasury secretary in 1985 to his departure in 1988

Besides Darman, Baker also brought Margaret Tutwiler and John F.W. Rogers from his White House staff to the Treasury department, as assistant secretary for Public Affairs and assistant secretary for Management, respectively.

=== Tax Reform Act of 1986 ===
The immediate priority of the Treasury under Baker was a plan to overhaul the tax code. Baker, as Chief of Staff, had placed a promise to "study" tax reform in the beginning of 1984, as a sop for the election year political climate. Regan's plan (known as Treasury 1) was released toward the beginning of 1985. It would have removed many tax loopholes preferred by Reagan's business-friendly base. Though Democrats, including former presidential nominee George McGovern, spoke highly of the plan, Baker received questions during his confirmation hearings from Senators concerned for their local industries. Some Republican donors also returned pins they had received for large donations to the party, as a gesture of dissatisfaction with the reform.

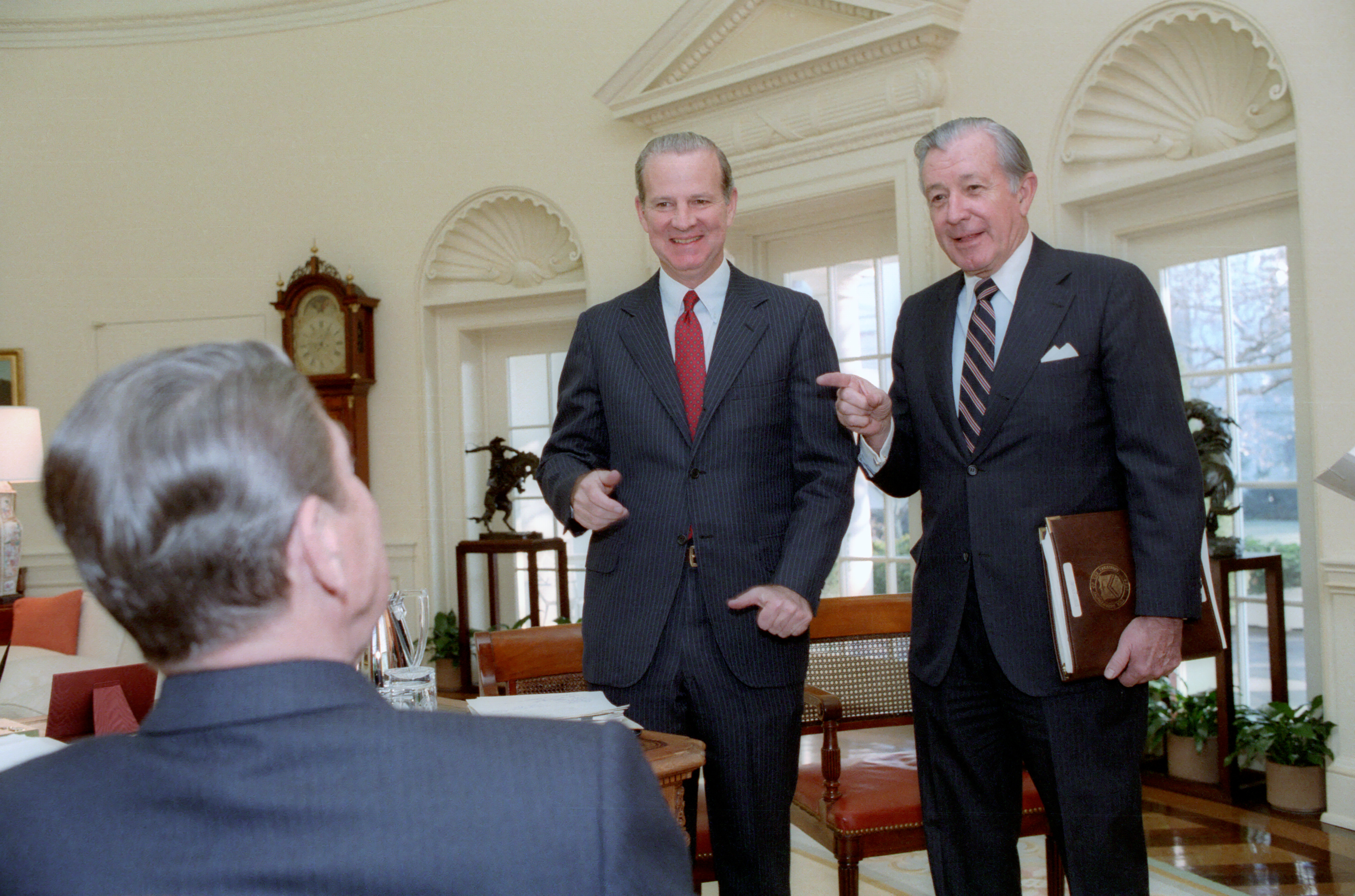
Donald Regan (right), who preceded Baker (center) as treasury secretary, and Baker, addressing Reagan (left) shortly after their new appointments

Over the course of four months, Baker and his staff drafted their own plan to present to Congress. Baker worked clandestinely on discussions between White House representatives and the offices of Senators Howard Baker (R-TN), Bob Dole (R-KS), Daniel Patrick Moynihan (D-NY), and Speaker of the House Tip O'Neill (D-MA). The goal was to develop a compromise that avoided controversy, which Baker consciously modeled off of the 1983 Social Security reforms.

The powerful House Ways and Means Committee chairman Dan Rostenkowski did not participate in Baker's preliminary negotiations, feeling it would cede Congressional authority if he joined an executive branch proposal. When Reagan announced the proposal—which he referred to as a "second American Revolution"—in May 1985, Rostenkowski broadcast his own response to clarify areas of difference.

Following the announcement in May, Baker continued to work with Rostenkowski and other members of Congress. In this process, one of Rostenkowski's aides noted that he "really played Rostentowski like a cello," by treating him with excessive regard.

The four "bedrock principles" Baker felt were necessary for reform were that it be revenue-neutral, would "reduce the top income tax rate for individuals to no higher than 35 percent, [would] remove millions of lower-income families from the tax rolls, and [would] retain the popular mortgage interest deduction."

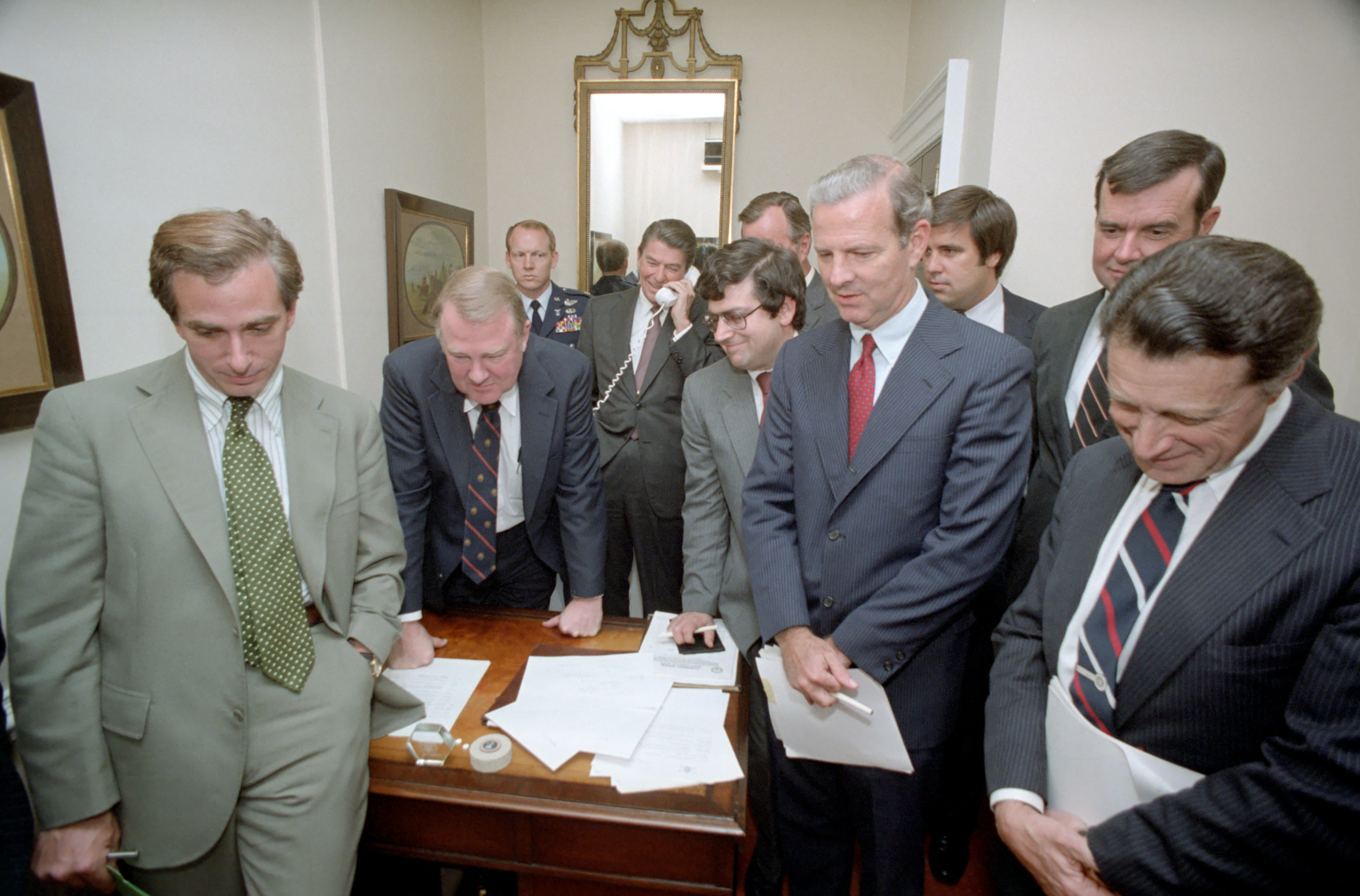
Baker (fourth from right) and other administration officials watching Congress vote on the 1986 tax bill

When Rostenkowski introduced his bill in December 1985, it offered different provisions, including a 38 percent top rate and fewer deductions, but Baker supported it. When some House Republicans, including Dick Cheney (R-WY) and Trent Lott (R-MS), tried to organize to reject the plan, Baker successfully appealed to Reagan to stop the revolt. Cheney credited Baker for having Reagan give a patriotic speech to House members in the immediate wake of the Arrow Air Flight 1285R crash in Canada that had resulted in the death of more than 200 U.S. Marines.

The bill passed the House in mid-December 1985 and was reported to the Senate for further consideration. In the Senate, Chairman Bob Packwood (R-OR) significantly revised the House plan, mainly by lowering the top tax rate to 25 percent for individuals, while increasing the corporate tax burden by closing loopholes and other initiatives. Baker supported Packwood's change and worked to lobby Senators to the plan. The bill eventually passed the Senate in July 1986 and, after the reconciliation process, was signed into law by Reagan on October 22, 1986.

Baker received credit for fostering the compromise that led to a major reform of the tax code. But Baker also earned notice for some carve-outs that he advocated for. Along with Senator John Danforth (R-MO), Baker strongly argued against a proposed tax on money gifted from grandparents to grandchildren. Aides believed Danforth and Baker vigorously condemned the so-called "kiddie tax" due in part to their vast personal wealth. Baker also weighed in to break an impasse in favor of oil-state Senators who wanted exemptions for the petrochemical industry. Baker's own extensive business with the industry and with his home state of oil-rich Texas was believed by some stakeholders to have informed his behavior.

Besides some of the broader issues, Baker also, in his words, used the bill to get "payback" against the Houston Chronicle for not endorsing him in his 1978 campaign for Texas attorney general. Due to a law passed in 1969, the newspaper's owners required periodic exemptions to maintain their stake. In the 1986 bill, Baker intentionally removed their exemption, leading to their sale in 1987 for $400 million to Hearst. Decades later, Baker told his biographers that he was happy "getting even."

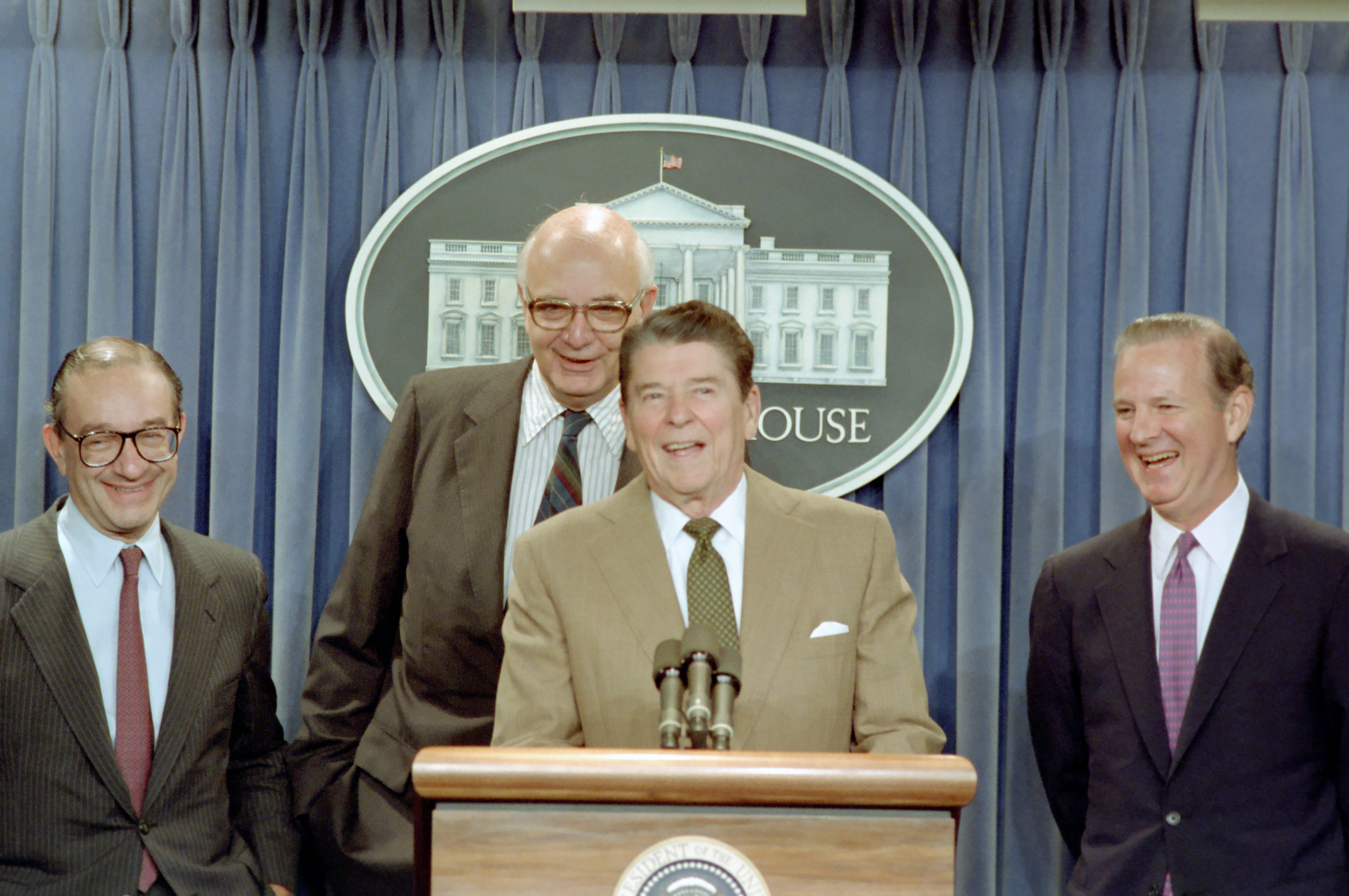
Secretary of the Treasury James Baker with U.S. President Ronald Reagan and Federal Reserve Chairman Paul Volcker at the White House Press Room during President Reagan's announcement of Alan Greenspan nomination to be the new chairman of the Federal Reserve Bank on June 2, 1987

=== Plaza Accord ===
In addition to the focus on tax reform, Baker paid attention to the issue of currency valuation. His feeling, according to his biographers, was that the increased strength of the US dollar had hampered domestic industries and exacerbated American trade deficits.To resolve the perceived issue, Baker met with finance ministers from Japan, France, West Germany, and the United Kingdom in September 1985 at the Plaza Hotel in New York City. The parties agreed to sell their stores of American currency to decrease the supply, aiming for a 10-12 percent depreciation in the dollar. To avoid speculation, Baker kept much of the press and the Reagan administration—including secretaries of state and commerce—out of the loop on a major agreement over international finance. Former Federal Reserve Chairman Paul Volcker and Japanese Vice Minister of Finance Toyoo Gyohten wrote that the Accord represented a "coup de grace" that sent a strong sign to guide the market.

In early 1987, the parties to the Plaza Accord met again in Paris to adjust their approach to the value of the dollar. In the intervening year and a half, the dollar had depreciated by 40 percent. Under the Louvre Accord, the parties agreed to stabilize it where it ended

=== 1987 stock market crash ===
On "Black Monday" in October 1987, American stock markets fell steeply. Baker's comments on monetary policy are considered one of multiple contributing factors to the crash.

In the middle of October 1987, Baker made multiple statements that threatened the US would not support the dollar vis-a-vis the Deutsche mark after West Germany raised its own interest rates. The October 18, 1987 New York Times carried an article detailing Baker's comments as an "abrupt shift" and noted that it might "erode markets." The next day, October 19, 1987, the Dow Jones Industrial Average experienced its largest ever single-day drop in value (22.6 percent). The event, which was preceded by smaller drops in the prior week and similar drops in the Asian and European markets, became known as "Black Monday." Though the event had multiple factors, some people laid blame on American monetary policy and Baker's comments specifically. In a survey of monetary policy, economist Yōichi Funabashi summarized the role of Baker's comments in the panic:

"...wait a minute. If [Baker] is using it as a lever [to influence the Bundesbank] and we believe it won't work, there is no bottom. If he isn't using it as a lever, and he just actually wants the dollar to go down, then there is no stability. And if he isn't clear whether it is one or the other of those, then he doesn't understand his own system and his own business, and we'll have a problem of confidence."

In the investigations after the crash conducted by the Brady Commission, Baker was accorded only a peripheral role in the crisis. The use of specific computer technology, group psychology and somewhat inflated valuation of some stocks, all contributed to the crash as much or more than Baker's comments.

=== Other ===
During the Reagan administration, Baker also served on the Economic Policy Council, where he played an instrumental role in achieving the passage of the administration's tax and budget reform package in 1981. He also played a role in the development of the American Silver Eagle and American Gold Eagle coins, which were released in 1986.

== Secretary of state (1989–1992) ==
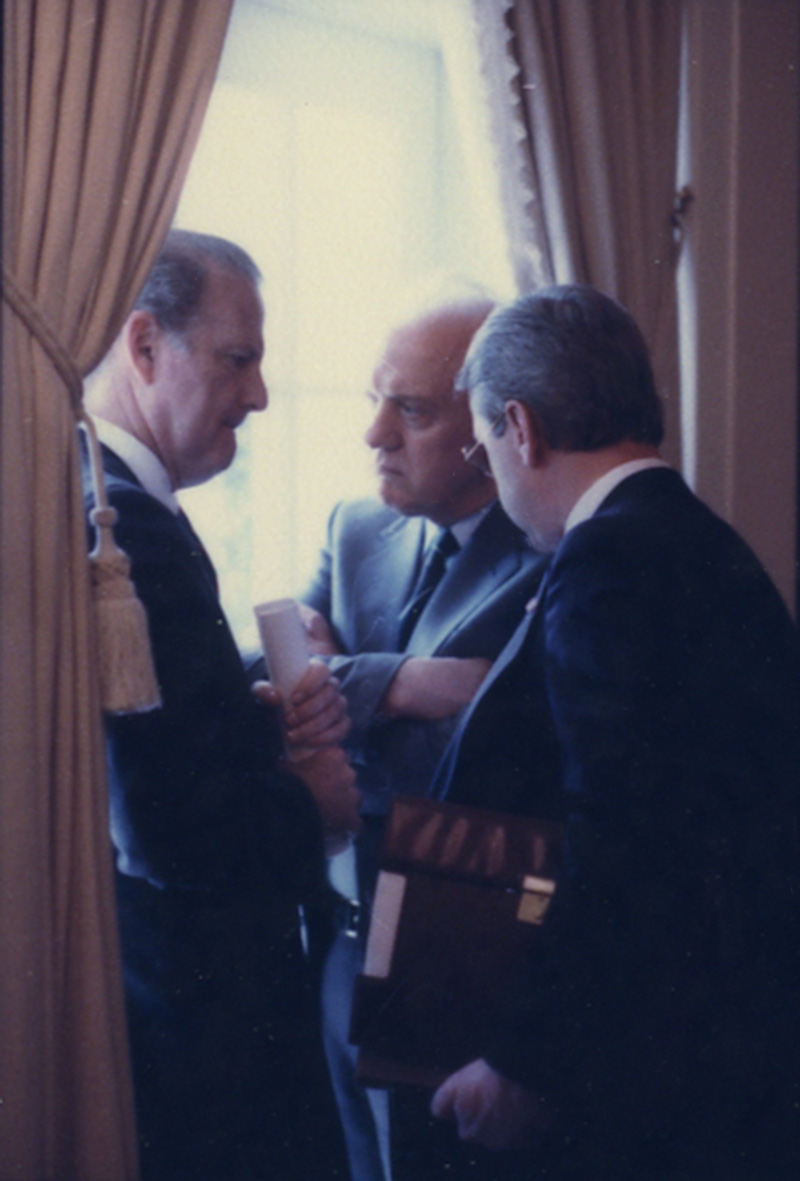
Baker (left) speaks with Soviet Foreign Minister Eduard Shevardnadze (center) in the White House Cabinet Room on June 1, 1990.

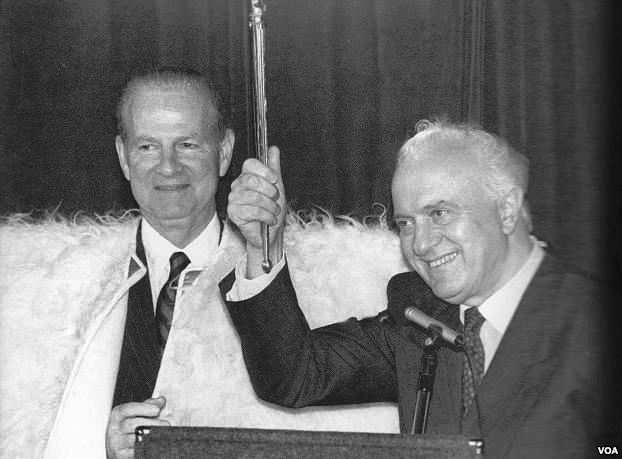
Baker (left) meets with Georgia's first post-independence president Eduard Shevardnadze in Tbilisi in 1992.

President George H. W. Bush announced Baker as his choice for secretary of state the day after his election victory. The Senate unanimously confirmed Baker on January 25, 1989.

Some perspective at the time framed Baker as equal to the president, which Bush wrote in his diary was "nonsense." Even so, Baker's relationship and status made him a powerful figure in the political landscape. In constructing the administration's foreign policy, Baker worked with Brent Scowcroft as National Security advisor, Dick Cheney as secretary of defense, and Bush himself. Baker also appointed Lawrence Eagleburger as his deputy secretary of state, with Margaret Tutwiler, Robert M. Kimmitt, Reginald Bartholomew, John F. W. Rogers among his subordinate undersecretaries. Richard Darman, who had served as Baker's deputy at the Treasury Department and White House, did not go to the State Department, instead leading the Office of Management and Budget.

As secretary of state, Baker presided over the dissolution of the Soviet Union. He frequently worked with his Soviet counterparts Eduard Shevardnadze and Alexander Bessmertnykh in the waning days of the USSR. He also visited each of the constituent states of the Soviet Union following their assertion of independence. Baker was the first American official to enter East Berlin after the fall of the Berlin Wall, and worked throughout his early tenure on German Reunification, which was completed by 1991.

In negotiations over German reunification, Baker made the statement to Shevardnadze and Soviet Premier Mikhail Gorbachev that "there would be no extension of NATO's jurisdiction for forces of NATO one inch to the east". Russian President Vladimir Putin, and others, have used the statement to argue for the justness of the 2014 annexation of Crimea and subsequent Russo-Ukraine War, on the basis that Baker had misled the Soviet Union into ceding its territories. Gorbachev expressly rejected this claim, claiming that, with Baker, "everything that could have been and needed to be done to solidify [his] political obligation was done." Gorbachev instead dated NATO's expansion eastward to 1993 and said it did not connect to previous promises.

Baker also played a major role in the 1991 Gulf War. After Iraq invaded Kuwait in 1990, he and the administration worked to pass UN Resolution 678, which would authorize the formation of a military coalition to repel Iraqi forces. Baker spent multiple months traveling to countries to encourage both political and financial support for military intervention to stop Hussein. Traveling 100,000 miles over ten weeks, he visited the Soviet Union, the United Kingdom, France, Bahrain, Turkey, Egypt, Saudi Arabia, and other countries. Baker received criticism during the war for the department's failure to predict the invasion and for comments that were believed to reduce the war to financial terms.

Besides the dissolution of the Soviet Union and the Gulf War, Baker's tenure as secretary of state also featured incidents elsewhere. In Nicaragua, Baker worked to support Violeta Chamorro against the Sandinista incumbent Daniel Ortega, in the wake of the Iran-Contra scandal over American funding for armed opposition to the Sandinista government. Baker also helped organize the Madrid Conference of 1991, which was convened to help resolve issues between Israel and the Palestine Liberation Organization.

=== White House chief of staff (1992–1993) ===
The 1992 election was complicated by the on-again-off-again candidacy of Ross Perot, who would end up taking 19% of the popular vote. In August, following the Democratic Convention, with Bush trailing Clinton in the polls by 24 points, Bush announced that Baker would return to the White House as chief of staff and as head of the re-election campaign. However, despite playing a large role in Republican victories in 1980, 1984, and 1988, Baker did not succeed in leading the 1992 campaign. Bush lost to Clinton by 370 electoral votes to 168.

== Shift to private sector ==
After his departure from 12 years of government service, Baker joined Baker Botts as a senior partner, as well as the Carlyle Group and Enron. He also became the honorary chair of the James A. Baker III Institute of Public Policy at Rice University in Houston, Texas.

=== Enron ===
Baker briefly worked for the company Enron as a consultant from 1993 to 1995.

The Enron Corporation hired Baker as a consultant within a month of his departure from the White House, and Enron said that Baker would have an opportunity to invest in any projects he developed. Baker said he joined the company largely due to fellow Houstonian Robert Mosbacher, who also went to the company after serving in Bush's cabinet.

During a 1993 trip in which he and Bush received medals from the Kuwaiti government for their work during the Gulf War, Baker worked on a deal with the Kuwaiti government that would allow Enron to restore a massive energy plant that had been destroyed during the Iraqi invasion. According to his biographers, Baker did not speak to officials about the details of the project itself and only spoke about his own time in government service. A September 1993 report by Seymour Hersh catalogued questionable ethical ties from Bush administration officials relating to the post-war rebuilding of Kuwait, including the work Baker (and Lt. General Thomas Kelly) did for Enron. Per Hersh,

The argument can be made, and has, that Baker and the others were pursuing contracts that, were it not for their special connections, would be awarded to Japanese or European concerns. Understood this way, the issue, to put it as Baker once did in justifying American involvement in the Gulf War, is jobs, jobs, jobs. And Bush’s sons and his former aides have, of course, broken no laws in attempting to do business in Kuwait.

Hersh also questioned whether it was a disrespect to American servicemembers to so quickly "us[e] their sacrifice as a kind of calling card." Baker confronted Hersh and claimed that the article "screwed" him and that his intention was only to "help an American company".

Baker stayed with the company briefly, leaving in 1995. After Enron's collapse, Baker said that part of his issue with the company was its "success fee" incentive structure. Unless a consultant like Baker recommended projects that bore out and earned the success fee, they received little to no compensation. This policy, in his view, incentivized analysts to falsify numbers and "to put contracts on the books, whether they were good contracts or not.”

After Baker departed from the company, he still maintained relations amidst its scandals. As late as November 2001, after Enron had publicly admitted to falsifying years of financial reporting, Baker arranged for Fed Chairman Alan Greenspan to accept the Enron Award for Distinguished Public Service at a public ceremony. The award was a partnership between the Baker Institute and Enron.

=== Carlyle Group ===
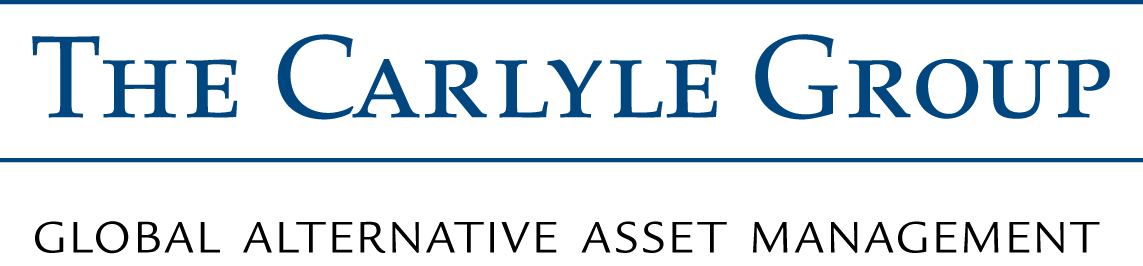
Baker worked as a senior consultant for The Carlyle Group from the end of his government tenure in 1993 to a 2005 controversy over influence peddling.

Baker joined the private equity firm The Carlyle Group shortly after his government service ended. Carlyle co-founder David Rubinstein said he originally offered the role to Baker while he was still chief of staff, but Baker demurred. After Baker's former deputy Richard Darman joined the company in late February, Baker himself joined in early March 1993.

Writer Michael Lewis identified Baker, along with former Cabinet-level officials Frank Carlucci and Darman, as part of Carlyle's cadre of "access capitalists."

The access capitalist enjoys a number of advantages over his progenitor, the Washington lobbyist [...] The access capitalist effectively sells the present value of all his influence, in perpetuity, each time he makes a phone call. What’s more, the access capitalist can plausibly represent himself as a higher social type—a businessperson rather than an influence-peddler—which gives him an edge if he decides to return to politics. But perhaps best of all for those who have spent their lives in politics, the access capitalist doesn’t really need to know much about business.

As the Carlyle group's strategy revolved around acquiring companies through private exchanges rather than through public auctions, Rubinstein felt that high-profile associates like Baker would allow the Carlyle Group to reach stakeholders otherwise unavailable to the public.

Let’s suppose you’re the CEO of G.M. and you get a call from Baker. You think, "Hey the former secretary of state wants to come out and have lunch with me. I’ll get the photographer out ... have my picture taken."

Baker's work with the Carlyle Group, as one of its most prominent members during its rise in the 1990s, remained controversial into the 2000s. An investigation by The Nation in 2004—when Baker was a presidential envoy for Iraqi debt relief—implicated Baker in Carlyle's efforts to acquire a billion dollars in investment from the Kuwaiti government, effectively leveraging Baker's government service during the First Gulf War in pursuit of private profit. In 2003, Baker commented that though people "like to bitch about" his work with the Carlyle group, he felt that he should not be punished for wanting to make money in the private sector. He claimed he never directly asked for money from investors, and only gave speeches about his government experience. Rubinstein cosigned the claim, telling Baker's biographers that Baker "never brought a deal in, he never worked on a deal, and I never asked him to ask for money."

In 2005, due to the unpopularity of the Bush administration and controversies over conflicts of interest, Rubinstein asked Baker to leave the organization. Baker himself had been identified, including in Michael Moore's film Fahrenheit 9/11, as part of a link between the Bush family, the Carlyle Group, the bin Laden family and an alleged Saudi influence scheme, though multiple sources questioned such claims. To mitigate Baker's embarrassment, Rubinstein offered that his departure could be timed for his 75th birthday. Shortly after he departed from Carlyle, Baker joined a different private-equity firm based in Dallas—Ewing Management—which was itself formed under the Carlyle Group banner by former Carlyle executive Edward Ewing.

==== Diplomatic work ====
In March 1997, Baker became the personal envoy of the UN Secretary-General for Western Sahara. In June 2004, he resigned from this position, frustrated over the lack of progress in reaching a complete settlement acceptable to both the government of Morocco and the pro-independence Polisario Front. He left behind the Baker II plan, accepted as a suitable basis of negotiations by the Polisario and unanimously endorsed by the Security Council, but rejected by Morocco.

== James A. Baker Institute for Public Policy ==
Rice University sought a way to bolster its public policy school as early as the 1980s. At the beginning of Bush's term, the university offered Rice as a location for his presidential library, but Bush declined. After Baker gave a commencement address at Rice in 1991, political science professor Richard Stoll suggested that Baker would be a good alternative candidate should Bush lose re-election.

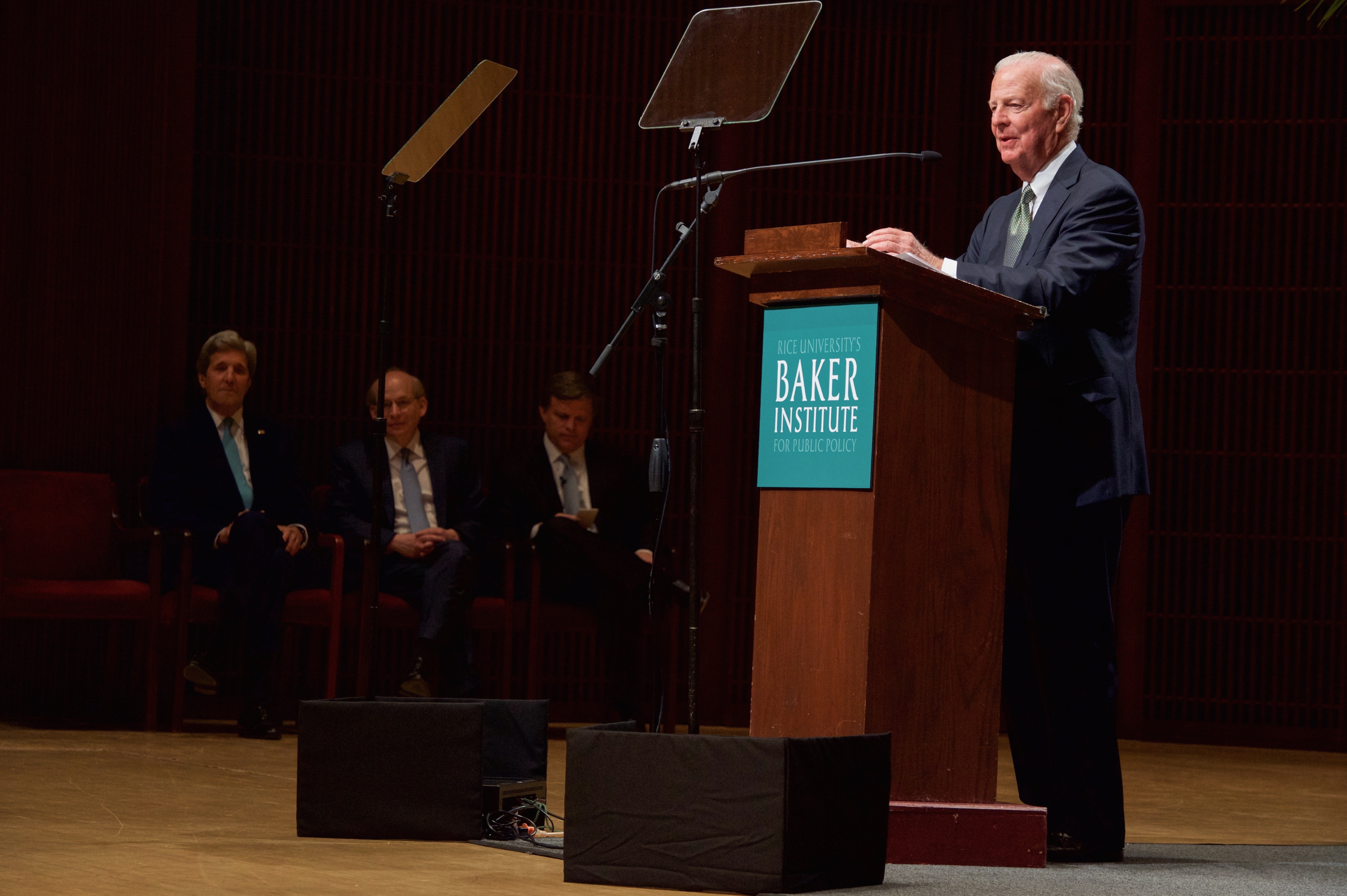
Former Secretary Baker introduces Secretary Kerry before he delivers a speech at the Baker Institute in 2016.

On January 14, 1993—a week before the end of Bush's presidency—Rice announced that the school would appoint Baker to the board and create a public policy institute in his name. Baker's grandfather was the personal lawyer for Rice namesake William Marsh Rice. He chaired the Board of Trustees from its 1891 charter until his death in 1941 and was also himself the namesake for Rice's first residential college, Baker College.

Around its 10th anniversary, S.C. Gwynne of Texas Monthly wrote that the organization had become "notable for its prodigious ability to raise money and an equally prodigious ability to draw famous speakers to its programs and conferences." Included among those famous speakers were Mikhail Gorbachev in 1997, Nelson Mandela in 1999, Vladimir Putin in 2001, and Barack Obama in 2018. The Baker Institute also hosted, with Baker himself often accompanying, multiple sitting US secretaries of state—including Condoleezza Rice in 2008, John Kerry in 2016, Mike Pompeo in 2019, and Antony Blinken in 2023—and former presidents George H.W. Bush, George W. Bush, and Jimmy Carter.

Baker occasionally participates in high-profile conversations at the institute, as with Obama in 2018 for the organization's 25th anniversary and with Hillary Clinton and Henry Kissinger in 2023 for the 30th anniversary.

The Baker Institute also irregularly grants the James A. Baker III Prize for Excellence in Leadership to prominent figures, including Colin Powell (2007), Marguerite Barankitse (2017), Brian Mulroney (2019), Austin Tice (2022), and Condoleezza Rice (2024). Before its collapse, Enron sponsored the James Baker Prize's predecessor, the Enron Prize (also administered by the Baker Institute), which recognized Colin Powell (1995), Mikhail Gorbachev (1997), Nelson Mandela (1999), and Alan Greenspan (2001).

Baker himself has been very involved in the Institute since its founding, especially in fundraising and networking, but is not the day-to-day director. The institute was led by former ambassador (and his personal friend) Edward Djerejian from 1994 to 2021, and has been led by David Satterfield since 2022. Baker originally offered the directorship to Dennis Ross, but he declined to work in the Clinton administration.

== 2000 recount ==
Though Baker had assisted Bush's father throughout his political career and presidency, he did not play an official role during George W. Bush's 2000 campaign. Early in the Bush campaign, in 1999, conservative columnist Robert Novak reported that Bush officials were emphatic about avoiding old hands like Baker and former National Security Advisor Brent Scowcroft. Bush and his father apologized to Baker for the bluntness of the sentiment, but Baker himself declaimed about his disinterest, saying that Bush's campaign was best run by younger men than him. The morning after Election Day, Bush's campaign chairman, Donald Evans, asked him to go to Florida for the fight over the recount. Given the ties between the Bush family and Baker, as well as his recognition as a top-tier campaign talent who was "skilled at PR, the law, politics," Cheney suggested him to lead the team in Florida.

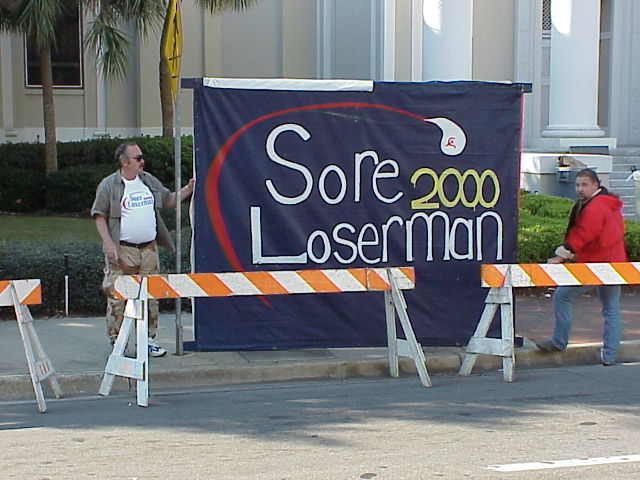
Pro-Bush activist displays "Sore Loserman" nickname in Tallahassee in 2000.

Baker approached the dispute in Florida as a zero-sum political fight, frustrating his interlocutor Warren Christopher, who wanted to negotiate terms for a bilateral investigation into the results. Baker argued that such a plan would unfairly help the Gore campaign, but admitted that his side was "getting killed on ‘count all the votes,’ who the hell could be against that?" In response, Baker's team brought in provocateur Roger Stone as well as prominent Republican figures like Bob Dole and Arlen Specter to make the case for the campaign. The team also printed signs dismissing the Gore Lieberman ticket as "Sore Loserman" and distributed them to affiliated protestors. According to Baker's biographers, a poll during the recount effort found that Baker's arguments were convincing to 51 percent of respondents, while Christopher convinced only 42 percent.

Baker's biographers wrote that in the recount fight, he was "the field marshal mobilizing the troops, the chief strategist calling the shots." Jake Tapper wrote that Baker was the "general manager," to Benjamin Ginsberg's "coach." In interpreting the saga through the frame of William Shakespeare's Twelfth Night, Harold Bloom compared Baker to the "incessant fortune-hunter" Sir Andrew Aguecheek. Shortly after the recount fight, Washington Monthly editor Paul Glastris wrote that Baker was "widely feared for his cold-blooded effectiveness."

Baker's own team totaled around 30 people, many from his firm Baker Botts, and lawyers who would later be appointed to government positions by the Bush administration, including John Bolton, John Roberts, and Brett Kavanaugh. Future Supreme Court Justice Amy Coney Barrett also worked in Florida on Bush's legal team. Though Baker was himself a lawyer and led a team of lawyers, much of the litigation in the case was not under his purview. While the original first choice for lead advocate was former Senator John Danforth (R-MO), he wondered whether it would be improper for the federal courts to intervene in state election procedures. Baker felt that his "heart [was] not in it" and so chose Theodore Olsen—who later served as Bush's first-term solicitor general—as lead advocate instead.

After the Florida Supreme Court ruled against the Bush team, Baker said at a news conference that he felt the court had rewritten election rules and would welcome the Florida state legislature to nullify the ruling. Legal journalist Anthony Lewis condemned Baker's news conference in an opinion column, writing that it was a "despicable" choice by Baker to "encourag[e] defiance of a court." Baker did not go to the U.S. Supreme Court himself, but kept apprised of the arguments from headquarters in Tallahassee. When the court's opinion was faxed over—and campaign aide (a former clerk for Chief Justice William Rehnquist) Ted Cruz confirmed their meaning—Baker became the first to congratulate Bush as president-elect.

The 2008 HBO film Recount covers the month following the controversial election. Baker was interviewed during the making of the film, and British actor Tom Wilkinson portrayed him in it. The Baker Institute hosted a preview screening of the movie with a question-and-answer featuring Baker and former president Jimmy Carter. Baker praised the film as "solidly entertaining," but both he and Carter said they thought that the depiction of Warren Christopher was unfair.

== George W. Bush administration ==
Baker did not immediately join the Bush administration after prevailing in the Florida recount fight. He was considered for leadership at the World Bank, but Baker instead returned to work at Baker Botts, Carylyle and the Baker Institute. Baker informally weighed in on the administration, both in private and in public. He strongly discouraged Bush from appointing Donald Rumsfeld as Defense Secretary due to his perceived treachery against Bush's father in 1976, saying that Bush should remember "what he did to your daddy." In an August 2002 essay, he encouraged Bush to seek a United Nations Security Council resolution to support regime change in Iraq. Baker declined to weigh in on the prudence of regime change in general, but he advised that it could not be achieved without significant investment.

"The only realistic way to effect regime change in Iraq is through the application of military force, including sufficient ground troops to occupy the country (including Baghdad), depose the current leadership and install a successor government".

The day after Baker's essay, Vice President Dick Cheney rejected a multilateral path to military intervention in Iraq in a speech to the Veterans of Foreign Wars, saying that international inspections would "provide no assurance whatsoever of [Saddam Hussein's] compliance with UN resolutions."

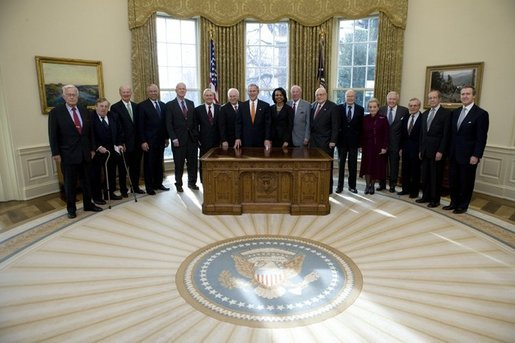
President George W. Bush poses for a photo Thursday, January 5, 2006, in the Oval Office with former secretaries of state and secretaries of defense, following a meeting on the strategy for victory in Iraq. Baker stands third from left.

Baker served occasionally as an informal advisor to Bush during his first term. In July 2003, Bush enlisted Baker to meet with Georgian President Eduard Shevardnadze to ensure that the 2003 Georgian parliamentary election would be run democratically. Shevardnadze agreed to administer the election along the principles Baker laid out, but the November elections were widely recognized as questionable. After three weeks of protests during the Rose Revolution, Shevardnadze resigned as president.

Baker also advised George W. Bush on Iraq. When the U.S. occupation of Iraq began in 2003, he was one of the Bush administration's first choices to direct the Coalition Provisional Authority, but he was deemed too old.

=== Envoy for Iraqi debt relief ===
In December 2003, President George W. Bush appointed Baker as his special envoy to ask various foreign creditor nations to forgive or restructure $100 billion in international debts owed by the Iraqi government, which had been incurred during the tenure of Saddam Hussein. Before taking the post, Baker required that he be allowed to report only to the president, circumventing both Cheney and the State Department.

Baker's work as envoy resulted in France, Germany, Japan, Russia, China, Kuwait, and Saudi Arabia agreeing to erase large portions of the Iraqi debt. Multiple countries asked that Baker guarantee that they would have commercial access to a post-Hussein Iraq, especially in question after deputy secretary of defense Paul Wolfowitz announced that some countries would be barred from bidding on reconstruction projects in Iraq.

While he was an envoy, The Nation published a document that the Carlyle Group shared with the Kuwaiti government on the same day that Baker was in Kuwait negotiating with the government on Iraqi debt relief. The documents offer the services of Carlyle—where Baker worked as a prominent consultant—as part of a consortium that would help Kuwait receive billions of dollars in war reparations from the 1990 Iraqi invasion. The document, as quoted by the magazine, explicitly references Baker's role as envoy:

"The extent to which these individuals can play an instrumental role in fashioning strategies is now more limited... due to the recent appointment of Secretary Baker as the President's envoy on international debt, and the need to avoid an apparent conflict of interest.... We believe that with Secretary Baker's retirement from his temporary position [as debt envoy], that Carlyle and those leading individuals associated with Carlyle will then once again be free to play a more decisive role..."

According to his biographers, Baker called Carlyle head David Rubinstein demanding that the Kuwait proposal be rescinded and said that it was clearly a "direct conflict" with his work for the Bush administration. Rubinstein later withdrew Carlyle from the consortium that had proposed the deal.

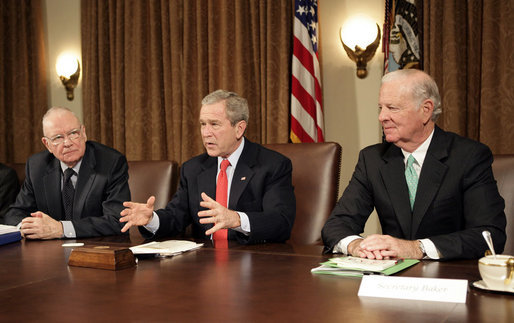
U.S. President George W. Bush with Lee Hamilton, left, and former Secretary of State James Baker in the Cabinet Room, Dec. 6. 2006

=== Iraq Study Group ===
A 2005 bill sponsored by Rep. Frank Wolf (R-VA) established a bipartisan group of prominent national figures to recommend a path forward for the country in Iraq. Coming after the revelations of the Abu Ghraib prison torture and with Wolf's own doubts about prospects for success in the country, the Group was meant to provide an alternate to the party-line narrative from the White House. Baker became the co-chairman of the committee due to his relationship with the Bush family and his dignified reputation. As Condoleezza Rice put it, the administration wanted a "brand name that people would trust, and we needed someone that we could trust not just to make it a polemic."

Baker's Democratic counterpart was retired Rep. Lee Hamilton (D-IN), who had previously participated in the drafting of the 9/11 Commission Report. Hamilton appointed the Democratic-aligned members and Baker appointed the Republican-align members, including his former aide Robert Gates, Senator Alan Simpson (R-WY), Justice Sandra Day O'Connor, and New York City Mayor Rudy Giuliani. After Giuliani missed multiple meetings and started angling to run for the Republican nomination for president in 2008, Baker replaced him with his former troika colleague Edwin Meese. After Gates became secretary of defense, Baker replaced him with Larry Eagleburger, his successor as secretary of state in 1992.

The Iraq Study Group examined several ideas, including one that would create a new power-sharing arrangement in Iraq that would give more autonomy to regional factions. On October 9, 2006, The New York Times quoted co-chairman Baker as saying "our commission believes that there are alternatives between the stated alternatives, the ones that are out there in the political debate, of 'stay the course' and 'cut and run.'"

Baker worked extensively through the Study Group in meeting the White House and conservatives where they were. After Chief of Staff Joshua Bolten informed Baker that Bush was planning to "double down" on the war, Baker included a sentence in the report endorsing group-member Chuck Robb's preference for a "short-term" surge in troops to secure Baghdad. Though Baker specifically highlighted the sentence to Bush in an effort to sell the report to him, the administration did not heed the Iraq Study Group's broader argument about the failures of the war and its recommended reversal of administration policy. Bush only conceded that the report was "worthy of serious study."

Though the Iraq Study Group was generally collegial, shortly after it completed its report, Baker and Hamilton publicly disagreed on its policy implications. Hamilton argued in a March 2007 Washington Post editorial that a House plan requiring a withdrawal of US troops in Iraq by mid-2008 had laudably followed the Iraq Study Group's recommendations. A week later, Baker wrote in his own Washington Post editorial that while he agreed with much of Hamilton's perspective, they did "not set timetables or deadlines for the removal of troops, as contemplated by the supplemental spending bills the House and Senate passed." For the Brookings Institution, writer Michael E. O'Hanlon leaned toward Hamilton's interpretation, citing a portion of the report that said "by the first quarter of 2008 [...] all combat brigades not necessary for force protection could be out of Iraq.”

=== Other advisory positions ===
Bob Woodward claimed, in his 2006 book State of Denial, that White House Chief of Staff Andrew Card urged President Bush to replace Secretary of Defense Donald Rumsfeld with Baker following the 2004 presidential election. Bush later confirmed that he made such an offer to Baker but that he declined. Bush again offered the role to Baker in November 2005. Baker worried that his age was too great and that the position he would be placed in was too fraught to find success, though he considered the prestige of completing the trifecta of prominent cabinet roles after his tenure at Treasury and State.

The Bush administration asked Baker to replaced George Tenet as CIA director in 2004, but he declined. Baker also helped the administration after the 2004 election by back-channelling with the Kerry campaign after it argued for recounts due to the close margins in Ohio. Baker spoke to campaign operative Vernon Jordan, who encouraged Kerry to concede.

== Later life ==
Baker serves on the Honorary Council of Advisers for the U.S.-Azerbaijan Chamber of Commerce. The Atlantic Council also lists Baker, along with other former executive branch appointees, among its Honorary Directors. Baker was elected a fellow of the American Academy of Arts and Sciences in 2008. Baker also serves as an honorary co-chair for the World Justice Project and the Eurasia Foundation.

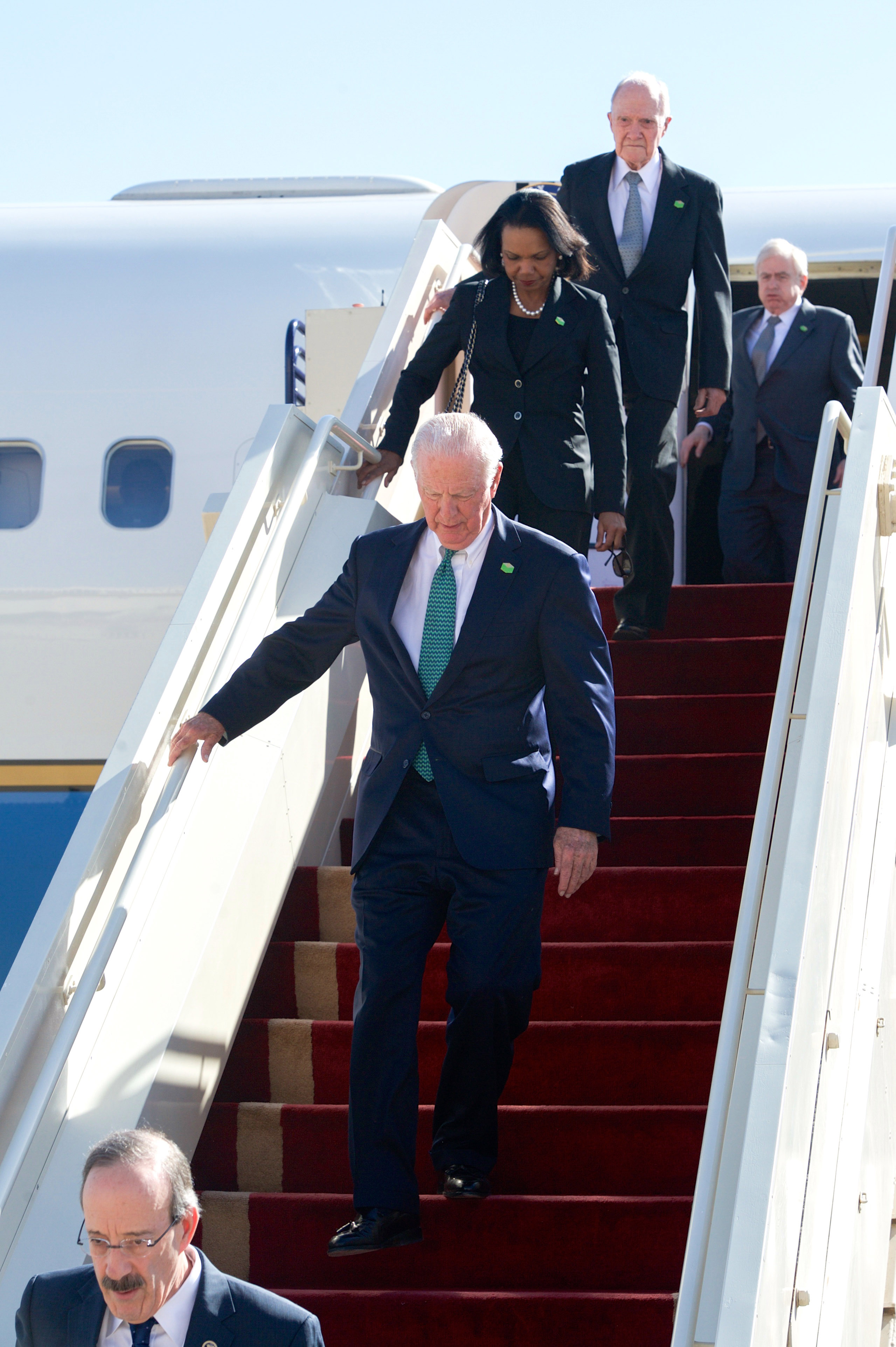
Baker arriving in Riyadh, Saudi Arabia, 2015

Baker endorsed moderate senator Kay Bailey Hutchinson in her 2010 primary challenge to Texas governor Rick Perry, based on her "record and vision." In the primary, Hutchinson received 30.3 percent of the vote to Perry's 51.1. Baker immediately endorsed Perry after his primary victory.

Baker provisionally endorsed Jeb Bush in 2014 for the 2016 Republican presidential nomination. Baker later served as a foreign policy advisor for the former governor. Baker drew controversy in the Jeb Bush campaign after he gave a speech to the liberal Jewish advocacy group J Street, where he criticized Benjamin Netanyahu for forsaking a two-state solution. Republican boosters, including Sheldon Adelson and the Zionist Organization of America, publicly expressed doubts about the Bush campaign itself due to Baker's comments. In response, Bush said that he disagreed with aspects of Baker's speech and that his foreign policy would not be defined by older advisors like Baker and George Shultz.

Baker co-founded the Climate Leadership Council, along with Henry Paulson and George P. Shultz. In 2017, this group of "Republican elder statesmen" proposed that conservatives embrace a fee and dividend form of carbon tax (in which all revenue generated by the tax is rebated to the populace in the form of lump-sum dividends0.0), as a policy to deal with anthropogenic climate change. The group also included Martin S. Feldstein and N. Gregory Mankiw.

=== Donald Trump ===
Baker voted for Donald Trump in the 2016 election and did so again in the 2020 election. During a 2016 memorial service for Nancy Reagan, he commented to former Canadian prime minister Brian Mulroney that he believed there were parallels between the rise of Trump and the rise of Reagan. Baker informally advised Trump during his 2016 presidential campaign and suggested the appointment of Rex Tillerson as secretary of state. During the 2016 campaign, Baker publicly criticized Trump's stated foreign policy goals—especially his protectionist and hawkish tendencies, but said he wouldn't get his "panties in a wedge."

Baker told his biographers that his preference for Trump was firm, basing it on his commitment to the Republican party and his feeling that, as they paraphrased, "it was worth it to get conservative judges, tax cuts, and deregulation." Despite his consistent intentions, he did briefly question his approach in 2019, after considering the Democratic primary candidate Joe Biden to be a possible choice. He denied his wavering, telling his biographers, "Don't say I will vote for Joe Biden," because he didn't want to abandon or hurt the Republican party. After the U.S. Capitol attack on January 6, 2021, Baker told his biographers, during a forum at the Hamilton Lugar School at Indiana University, that he did not "buy into" Trump's attacks on the results, despite his own past litigating the 2000 election on behalf of George W. Bush.

== Personal life ==
Baker met his first wife, the former Mary Stuart McHenry, of Dayton, Ohio, while on spring break in Bermuda with the Princeton University rugby team. They married in 1953. Together they had four sons, including James Addison Baker IV (1954), a partner at Baker Botts, as well as Stuart McHenry Baker (1956), John Coalter Baker (1960), and Douglas Bland Baker (1961) of Baker Global Advisory.

Mary Stuart Baker died of breast cancer on February 18, 1970.

Though he goes by James A. Baker III, Baker is technically the fourth such name in his family line. Baker's grandfather removed his own "Jr." sometime in the 1870s before the birth of Baker's father. His firstborn son retained the ordering as James A. Baker IV.

In 1973, Baker and Susan Garrett Winston, a divorcée and a close friend of Mary Stuart, were married. Baker is an ardent hunter, and after marrying her, went with her on a "hunting-moon" to the Victoria Falls Hotel in Rhodesia (later Zimbabwe) for a 23-day safari trip. He imported $3,000 worth of hunting trophies, including a rug made from a wildebeest, following his safari. Winston had two sons and a daughter with her former husband. In September 1977, she and Baker had a daughter, Mary Bonner Baker. In 1985, Susan Garrett Baker was one of four "Washington Wives" who founded the Parents Music Resource Center (PMRC), a bipartisan United States government committee with the stated goal of increasing parental control over children's access to music deemed to have violent, drug-related, or sexual themes.

When Saddam Hussein's forces took Kuwait City in August 1990, Baker was in Mongolia on a planned hunting trip for ibexes, but he had to cut it short due to the crisis. He postponed a pheasant-hunting trip in 2000 with Bush in Scotland to assist George W. Bush in the 2000 recount effort. Baker has said that his experience turkey-hunting with Florida Senator Lawton Chiles influenced his strategy during the recount process.

Baker and his wife own a substantial property in remote Wyoming near Boulder, where Baker would retreat from public life. They bought the 1,555-acre (629 ha) property, known as Silver Creek Ranch, for $625,000 shortly after Baker's success in the 1988 presidential election.

On June 15, 2002, Virginia Graeme Baker, the seven-year-old granddaughter of Baker, daughter of Nancy and James Baker IV, drowned due to suction entrapment in a spa. To promote greater safety in pools and spas, Nancy Baker gave testimony to the Consumer Product Safety Commission, and James Baker helped form an advocacy group, which led to the Virginia Graeme Baker Pool And Spa Safety Act (15 USC 8001). Another granddaughter, Rosebud Baker, is a stand-up comedian and writer.

== Public image and legacy ==
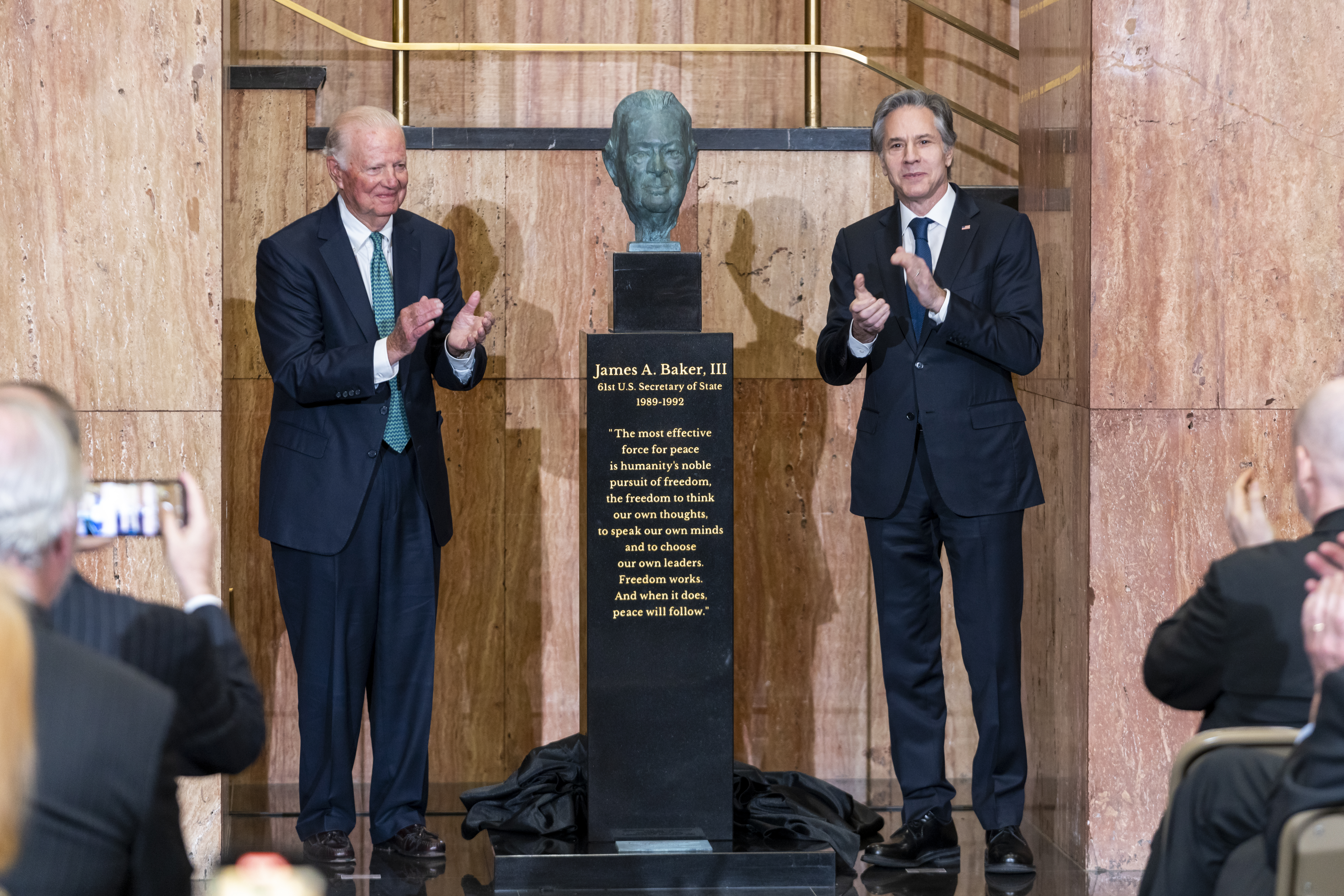
Baker (left) unveiling a bust of himself with Secretary of State Antony Blinken on April 4, 2022

In January 1989, Washington Post writer Marjorie Williams, who called him then "perhaps the most powerful unelected man in America," described his public image:

Jim Baker, man of the sterling reputation, has come to represent a Washington ideal. A competitor, in a city whose weightiest transactions are commonly described as a game; a gentleman, in an establishment whose highest value is that antagonists be able to drink together after 6 p.m.; a corporate lawyer, in a culture that reserves its harshest punishments for the incautious, he has much to tell us about Washington's values.

Baker was known for having a watchful eye on his image and the image of his professional agenda. His biographers assigned a major role in his rise to prominence during the Reagan administration to "his assiduous courtship of journalists." They also quoted one of Baker's ghostwriters who said Baker admitted to the negative side of that reputation:

I got the reputation in the Reagan administration for being an extraordinarily prolific leaker. I was. In that milieu, it was rat fuck. If you didn't leak, you didn't live.

Others in the administrations he worked resented this self-aggrandizing behavior. Nancy Reagan, noting his "constant" leaks, privately reflected that Baker's "main interest was Jim Baker." After Baker resisted the pressure to run George H.W. Bush's 1988 and 1992 presidential campaigns, Barbara Bush called him "The Invisible Man." When Bush lost, Barbara and George W. felt, at the time, that his reticence had buried the campaign. Both later said that they did not blame or resent Baker for the failing.

Baker's colleagues and interlocutors also resented his self-interested tendencies and press cultivation. At various points in his political career, William Casey, Mikhail Gorbachev, Dan Quayle, and Ken Langone accused him of using leaks to get an edge in their respective dealings. The conservative columnist Robert Novak claimed that Baker used his leaking to "trash" Novak with other journalists and arranged a sort of "non-aggression pact" between himself and the Reagan administration to end the practice.

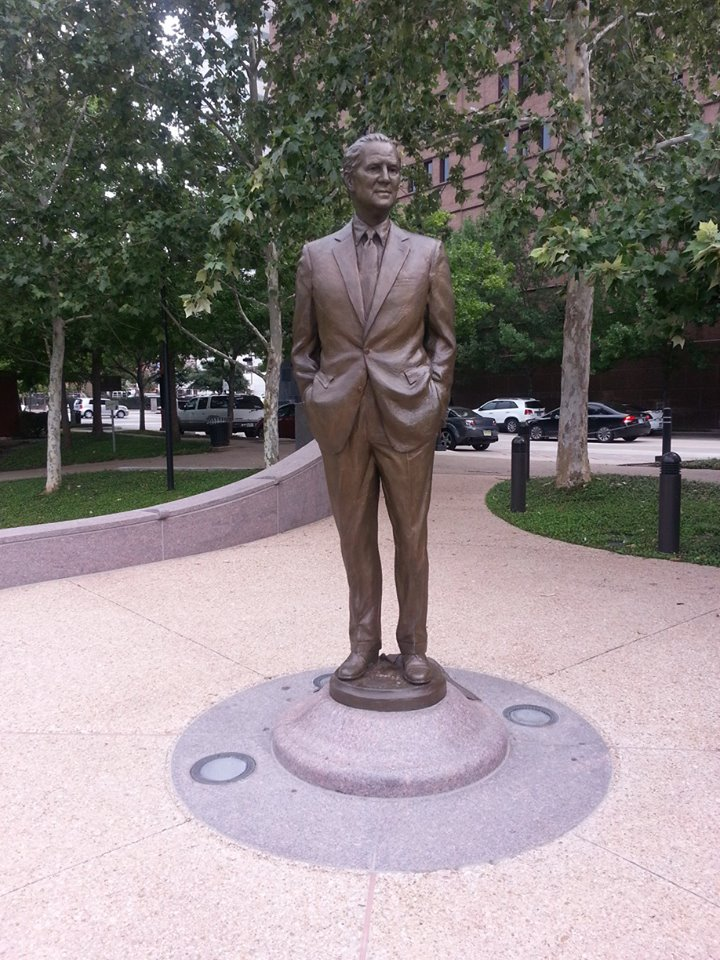
A statue of Baker by artist Chas Fagan, which was unveiled in 2012 in Sesquicentennial Park in Houston, Texas

In fall 1983, Baker personally intervened with Ronald Reagan to prevent a polygraph-based leaks investigation after a leak of a secret order Reagan gave to American troops in Lebanon. Baker had spoken to one of the reporters who reported the leaks, though he told his biographers that he had only shared "non-secret" information.

In late 2024, political reporter Jess Bidgood favorably contrasted Baker's "steady, behind-the scenes" expertise with the "bomb-throwing, hyper-macho and preternaturally online energy" of Trump appointees Elon Musk and Vivek Ramaswamy. Also in 2024, conservative lobbyist Michael McKenna wrote critically for The Washington Times that Baker was a "Rockefeller Republican with a Texas accent who did whatever he could to frustrate the Reagan agenda."

Former State Department analyst and scholar Aaron David Miller wrote that Baker was one of only three American leaders (with Henry Kissinger and Jimmy Carter) who belonged in the metaphorical "hall of fame" for Israel-Palestine peace negotiations. Miller credited Baker and the Madrid Conference as making the 1990s the only decade since Israel's founding without a major war.

Chris Whipple, who directed a documentary series on White House chiefs of Staff and later wrote a book on the same subject, referred to Baker in 2013 as the undisputed "tops" among chiefs of staff. In Whipple's estimation, Baker was "the closest confidant, the most powerful adviser, the consigliere and the guy who keeps everybody on the same page."

Baker was the subject of the PBS documentary James Baker: The Man Who Made Washington Work, which aired in March 2015. The documentary featured many of Baker's colleagues, including Dick Cheney, Condoleezza Rice, Colin Powell, and Henry Kissinger, and featured narration by Tom Brokaw.

=== Memoirs ===
External videos
- Booknotes interview with Baker on The Politics of Diplomacy, December 3, 1995, C-SPAN

In 1995, Baker published his memoirs of service as secretary of state in a book entitled The Politics of Diplomacy: Revolution, War and Peace, 1989–1992 (ISBN 0-399-14087-5). He mostly dictated the book through Newsweek writer Thomas DeFrank, with research from aide Derek Chollet, consultation from Margaret Tutwiler, and supervision from his State Department speechwriter Andrew Carpendale. The book-drafting process was fraught, according to Baker's biographers. Baker was keen on avoiding controversy and removed multiple passages admitting mistakes, including the admission that immediately withdrawing coalition forces from Iraq may have preserved Hussein's regime. Carpendale resigned after reading one revised draft and wrote a letter chastising Baker, saying that:

You alone will have to bear the burden when the lead review in The New York Times Book Review begins something like this: "In a colorful and readable memoir, James A. Baker, III manages to do as an author what he did so well in over twelve years in power in Washington: glorify his own successes, avoid any hint of failure, and skirt the truth."

Chief New York Times book critic Michiko Kakutani did conclude in her review that "the man famous for spinning the message of the week is now spinning his own image for history."

In 2006, Baker published a second memoir—written with ghostwriter Steve Fiffer—more focused on his entire political and personal life. Though it was "livelier" than the first effort, it also avoided controversy. His editor Neil Nyren wrote that his references to the ongoing Iraq War were "so cautious and nondescript that you might as well not be saying anything at all" and that "when even Brent [Scowcroft] can no longer contain himself (among others), readers are simply going to expect something more from you." Baker declined.

== Awards and honors ==
- Jefferson Awards for Public Service (1985)
- Presidential Medal of Freedom (1991)
- Golden Plate Award of the American Academy of Achievement (1998)
- Grand Cordon of the Order of the Rising Sun (2015)

== Notes ==
Party political offices
Preceded by Tom Cole	Republican nominee for Attorney General of Texas; 1978	Succeeded by Bill Meier
Political offices
Preceded by Jack Watson	White House Chief of Staff; 1981–1985	Succeeded by Don Regan
Preceded by Don Regan	United States Secretary of the Treasury; 1985–1988	Succeeded by Nicholas Brady
Preceded by George Shultz	United States Secretary of State; 1989–1992	Succeeded by Lawrence Eagleburger
Preceded by Samuel Skinner	White House Chief of Staff; 1992–1993	Succeeded by Mack McLarty
U.S. order of precedence (ceremonial)
Preceded by Chargés d'affaires to the United States	Order of precedence of the United States as Former U.S. Secretary of State	Succeeded by Condoleezza Rice as Former U.S. Secretary of State
