= Timothy Noah =

American journalist and author

- Noah in 2016
- Born: 1958 (age 67–68); New York City, US
- Occupations: Journalist, author
- Spouses: Marjorie Williams (m. 1990; died 2005) Sarah McNamer (m. 2018)
- Children: 2 (and 2 stepdaughters)
- Relatives: Peter Noah (brother); Adam Levine (nephew)

Timothy Robert Noah (born 1958) is an American journalist, author, and a staff writer at The New Republic. Previously he was labor policy editor for Politico, a contributing writer at MSNBC.com, a senior editor of The New Republic assigned to write the biweekly "TRB From Washington" column, and a senior writer at Slate, where for a decade he wrote the "Chatterbox" column. In April 2012, Noah published a book, The Great Divergence, about income inequality in the United States.

== Early life ==
Noah is a son of Marian Jane (née Swentor) and Robert M. Noah, a television producer. He grew up in New Rochelle, New York, and Beverly Hills, California. His father was Jewish, and his mother was Protestant; he describes himself as an atheist. He lives in Washington, D.C.

== Career ==
Earlier in his career, Noah was a Washington reporter for The Wall Street Journal.

On February 24, 2007, Noah wrote an article for Slate entitled "Evicted from Wikipedia", which critiques the online encyclopedia's notability policy as an illustration of our society's "love affair with invidious distinction", and cited Thorstein Veblen's 1899 critique of consumerism, The Theory of the Leisure Class to this effect.

The Great Divergence grew out of a ten-part series that Noah published in Slate in September 2010. The series won the 2011 Hillman Prize in the magazine category, and was the first online-only work ever to do so.

On March 22, 2013, Noah announced over Twitter that he had been fired by The New Republic; he did not know why. Editor Franklin Foer said "Tim Noah has been a strong voice for liberalism and a rigorous columnist for The New Republic. We’ve appreciated his passion and contribution to the magazine over the past two years and wish him the very best." Noah started freelancing a weekly column for the magazine again in 2020, and in September 2021 he rejoined the staff. As of 2025, Noah appears to have rejoined the magazine as a staff writer.

=== Iraq War ===
In a February 2003 article in Slate, Noah described his initial opposition to the Iraq War and his conversion to the pro-war position by Colin Powell's February 3 speech to the United Nations. After many of Powell's statements were proven false, Noah changed his mind again about the war, praising those who had remained steadfastly against it in an August 2004 column. After that, he became an outspoken critic of the media's ongoing tendency to grant credibility to war boosters, while discounting the views of those who opposed the war from the start.

== Personal life ==
Noah's first wife, fellow journalist Marjorie Williams, died of cancer in 2005. After her death, Noah edited an anthology of Williams' writing, The Woman at the Washington Zoo: Writings on Politics, Family, and Fate. The book won PEN's Martha Albrand Award for First Nonfiction and a National Magazine Award in the category of essays and criticism. A second Williams anthology, Reputation: Portraits in Power was published in October 2008.

In September 2018, Noah married Sarah McNamer, a medievalist and professor of English at Georgetown University.

Noah has two children and two stepchildren. His brother is television writer/producer Peter Noah. Their sister, Patsy Noah, co-founded the charity Your Mom Cares. She is the mother of Maroon 5 frontman Adam Levine.

== Selected appearances on CBS News's Sunday Morning ==
- "Income Immobility in the U.S.," March 17, 2013
- "Ban the Benjamins!," April 3, 2011
- "The Great Divergence" October 24, 2010
- "Why the Filibuster Deserves No Respect," March 14, 2010
- "Celebrity Commencements," May 24, 2009
- "Let Us Now 'Change' The Campaign Rhetoric," September 7, 2008
