= Baker Plan (debt relief) =

The Baker Plan was launched in October 1985 at the International Monetary Fund/World Bank meeting in Seoul, by James Baker, United States Secretary of the Treasury, as a way to combat the international debt crisis.

It was inspired by the idea that China's trade surplus could be used to relieve some of the Third World's problems with debt. The Plan was designed to help highly indebted middle-income countries, i.e., those countries that are not incredibly poor but nevertheless owe a large amount of money. Fifteen countries were mentioned, and ten of those were in Central and Latin America.

The Baker Plan was succeeded by the Brady Plan.
