= Walter Phelps Hall =

American academic

Walter Phelps Hall (1884–1962) was the Dodge Professor of History at Princeton University. He was a very popular professor among Princeton undergraduates during the first half of the 20th century.

Hall received his bachelor's degree from Yale University and his Ph.D. from Columbia University. He was known for occasionally standing on his desk while giving lectures.

Hall specialized in British and European history. Among his works were A History of England and the British Empire and The Course of Europe Since Waterloo.

== Sources ==
- article on Hall at Princeton
- Library thing listing of books by Hall
