= Marjorie Williams =

American journalist (1958–2005)

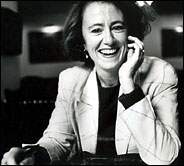
- Williams in the early 1990s
- Born: January 13, 1958; Princeton, New Jersey, U.S.
- Died: January 16, 2005 (aged 47); Washington, D.C., U.S.
- Resting place: Rock Creek Cemetery, Washington, D.C., U.S. 38.94736°N 77.01028°W
- Education: Harvard University (dropped out)
- Occupations: Writer, reporter, columnist
- Spouse: Timothy Noah (m. 1990)
- Children: 2
- Writing career
- Notable work: The Woman at the Washington Zoo (published posthumously)

Marjorie Williams (January 13, 1958 – January 16, 2005) was an American writer, reporter, and columnist for Vanity Fair and The Washington Post, writing about American society and profiling the American "political elite."

== Life and career ==
Williams was born in Princeton, New Jersey, to a scientist-turned-homemaker mother and a father who was an editorial director at Viking Press. After attending Harvard for two years, Williams dropped out in her junior year and moved to New York to work in publishing. Williams had a flair for the business but preferred to go into journalism, and in 1986 she got a job as an editor for The Washington Post.

A year later she became a reporter for the paper's "Style" section. Williams' deft political profiles were an immediate success and eventually she branched out to Vanity Fair, covering everyone from Bill Clinton to Barbara Bush to Colin Powell as well as penning profiles of her own struggles and foibles. She was also a member of Slate's book club, a group of writers who regularly paired off to conduct online dialogs about recently-published fiction and nonfiction, and contributed occasional book reviews to the Washington Monthly. In 2000 Williams became an op-ed columnist for the Post. A year and a half later, she was diagnosed with liver cancer; in spite of being told she only had a few months left, Williams lived for more than three years. Her final Post column, written in November 2004, focused on her young daughter's Halloween costume. In June 2011 the National Society of Newspaper Columnists named it one of the top 15 newspaper columns in American history.

Williams died on January 16, 2005, three days after her 47th birthday. She was survived by her stepmother, three sisters, her husband Timothy Noah (of Politico), and her two children. Her ashes were buried in Rock Creek Cemetery near the Adams Memorial.

In November 2005 a posthumous collection of Williams's writings, edited by Noah, was published under the title The Woman at the Washington Zoo. The book won PEN American Center's Martha Albrand Award For First Nonfiction and a National Magazine Award in the category of essays and criticism. The latter was for a previously unpublished essay in the book about Williams' experiences as a cancer patient, a shorter version of which appeared in Vanity Fair prior to the book's publication. A second anthology, Reputation: Portraits in Power was published in October 2008 (ISBN 978-1-58648-679-2).
