= Sustainable markets =

Sustainable exchange of goods and services

Sustainable markets are the context where the exchange of goods and services occurs with a sustainable, ethical and environmental mindset. It generates long-term value by benefiting shareholders and positively impacting the environment and society.

To create sustainable markets, the starting point are traditional markets. With cooperation among different stakeholders, regulation, policies and initiatives; traditional markets can become sustainable.

== From traditional markets to sustainable markets ==
Moving from traditional markets to sustainable markets requires actions to reduce poverty, protect the environment and ensure a healthier and more sustainable world for future generations. In other words, the transition is a way to face the fundamental changes that must be done regarding the way society consumes and produces. That includes: better information for all stakeholders, sustainability reports, reduce, reuse and recycle practices, resource efficiency, among others.

In order to transition to sustainable markets, there are different tools; one of them is the use of market governance mechanisms (MGMs) to change the behavior of economic actors. Examples of sustainable market MGMs include fair trade certifications, sustainable production reporting, carbon taxes, pollution control subsidies, and payments for ecosystem services. Public environmental policies shape the attitudes of producers and consumers and help to achieve the transition from traditional markets.

This transition cannot be achieved without cooperation and multi-stakeholder partnerships, as it involves more than one sector. Not only governments and businesses shape the market; every stakeholder does when consumes and produces. For this reason, not only international conferences, but als, everyday work is key to ensure this change.

== History ==
The concept of sustainable markets did not come out of nowhere. In 1987, the United Nations World Commission on Environment and Development defined the concept of sustainable development. It relates present responsibility to the future global situation. This concept is the starting point.

The 1972 Stockholm Declaration and the 1992 Rio Declaration are two global documents that, although they are not legally binding, helped establish principles regarding sustainable practices and sustainable markets.

After the UN World Conference on the Human Environment, where it was discussed how human activities affect the environment, the 1972 Stockholm Declaration was published. It includes fundamental ideas such as the linkage between economic and social development. It also takes into account the externalities regarding the extraction of resources. Principle 21 establishes the responsibility of states to ensure no environmental damage.

The 1992 Rio Declaration resulted from the UN Conference on Environment and Development. It is important because of its principles:

- Principle 3 declares that economic development cannot ignore Earth's capacity limits.
- Principle 7 establishes that states' responsibility for global degradation depends on their contribution to the damage and their capacity to address it.
- Principle 10 affirms that environmental damage are better addressed with public participation, including access to information and capacity to participate.
- Principle 12 asserts that states should cooperate to work in an open and supportive system that work for economic and sustainable development.
- Principle 15 specifies that although states do not possess full scientific certainty, it is not a reason not to implement measures to address environmental damages.

Who Cares Wins (2004-2008) was an initiative launched by the UN Global Compact, IFC and the Swiss government. 23 financial institutions participated and showed that ESG integration is a source of competitive advantage. It is key for the development of sustainable markets as it shows the link between sustainability and economic performance.

EU ETS was launched in 2005 and has four periods. Is the world's first international trading system. It is an example of the transition to sustainable markets, as among other regulations, it makes pollution a cost.

== Debates ==
As more legislation and policies become commonplace, there are also questions of whether it is ethical to impose market restrictions on developing countries.

Firstly, 10% of the richest population in the world are responsible for approximately 50% of global green-house gas emissions. Poorer countries have less resources to recover from environmental damage than developed countries do and are also more harshly impacted by economic restrictions.

Furthermore, there are unresolved debates over how much regulation or government intervention is appropriate for governing sustainable markets, including the use of ecotaxes. Moreover, climate development policies designed for developed countries can create market barriers and can slow down the growth of these countries.

There is also debate over which measures should be applied to protect vulnerable communities during the transition. Some of the measures include government intervention aligned with the local context and not the global regulation, retraining programs, local participation in the transition, and broader social protection measures.

Broader questions remain about the ability of sustainable markets to fully account for environmental costs, such as pollution and ecosystem collapse. Debates about the main focus of economic models, such as GDP or social well-being, also exist. There have been suggestions that a move away from a GDP focus is required for environmental prosperity. There are other indicators that can complement the GDP, like: Human Development Index, OECD Better Life Index and Just Transition Score.

== Organizations ==
A number of organizations are working in the sustainable markets field.

- The International Institute for Environment and Development's Sustainable Markets Group develops research and analysis towards sustainable markets and the debates and innovations shaping markets. This research also includes a database of market governance mechanisms.
- The U.S-based Skoll Foundation runs a program on sustainable markets which focuses on areas such as responsible supply chains, access to finance for sustainable small and medium enterprises, and work on environmental standards and certification.
- The International Institute for Sustainable Development runs the Sustainable Markets and Responsible Trade initiative. This focuses on the sustainability of international trade, as the design and implementation of supply chains.
- The Mistra Center for Sustainable Markets (Misum), based at Stockholm School of Economics, aims to provide policy research and advice to Swedish and international actors. Misum is a multidisciplinary and multi-stakeholder knowledge center dedicated to sustainability and sustainable markets and contains three research platforms: Sustainability in Financial Markets, Sustainability in Production, and Consumption & Sustainable Socio-Economic Development.
- Sustainable Markets Initiative is a private organization that works for a sustainable future.
- ISEAL Alliance is an international non-profit organization that creates social and environmental standards and policies.

== See More ==
- One of the ways to ensure the a positive impact is using the Triple Bottom Line tool to guarantee sustainable practices.
- Circular economy is an economic model that creates sustainable markets.
- Market governance mechanisms promote corporate sustainability.
