= Carbon price =

Greenhouse gas emission market

Emission trading and carbon taxes around the world (2021) Carbon emission trading implemented or scheduled Carbon tax implemented or scheduled Carbon emission trading or carbon tax under consideration

Carbon pricing (or CO_{2} pricing) is a method for governments to mitigate climate change, in which a monetary cost is applied to greenhouse gas emissions. This is done to encourage polluters to reduce fossil fuel combustion, the main driver of climate change. A carbon price usually takes the form of a carbon tax, or an emissions trading scheme (ETS) that requires firms to purchase allowances to emit. The method is widely agreed to be an efficient policy for reducing greenhouse gas emissions. Carbon pricing seeks to address the economic problem that emissions of CO_{2} and other greenhouse gases are a negative externality – a detrimental product that is not charged for by any market.

28% of global GHG emissions are covered by carbon pricing in 2025. In 2021, there was a major increase in the usage of carbon pricing due to the introduction of the Chinese national carbon trading scheme. Regions with carbon pricing include most European countries and Canada. On the other hand, top emitters like India, Russia, the Gulf states and many US states have not introduced carbon pricing. Australia had a carbon pricing scheme from 2012 to 2014. In 2020, carbon pricing generated $53B in revenue.

According to the Intergovernmental Panel on Climate Change, a price level of $135–$5500 in 2030 and $245–$13,000 per metric ton CO_{2} in 2050 would be needed to drive carbon emissions to stay below the 1.5°C limit. Latest models of the social cost of carbon calculate a damage of more than $300 per ton of CO_{2} as a result of economy feedbacks and falling global GDP growth rates, while policy recommendations range from about $50 to $200. Many carbon pricing schemes including the ETS in China remain below $10 per ton of CO_{2}. One exception is the European Union Emissions Trading System (EU-ETS) which exceeded €100 ($108) per ton of CO_{2} in February 2023.

A carbon tax is generally favoured on economic grounds for its simplicity and stability, while cap-and-trade theoretically offers the possibility to limit allowances to the remaining carbon budget. Current implementations are only designed to meet certain reduction targets.

As a supplement to carbon pricing enforced externally by national and subnational governments, organizations can also voluntarily implement their own internal carbon price (ICP) through a variety of tools. These include emissions trading systems, proxy prices, carbon fees, implicit prices, and hybrid models. Organizations have used a variety of metrics to define their carbon prices. Research on the impacts of ICP on institutional emissions and competition is ongoing.

== Overview ==
Carbon pricing is considered by many economists to be the most economically efficient way to reduce emissions, taking into account the costs of both efficiency measures and the inconvenience of lesser fossil fuels. By pricing the externalities of carbon emissions, efficiency comes about by eliminating the market failure of the unpriced external costs of carbon emissions at its source. It is regarded as more efficient than renewable energy subsidies given to individual firms, because the difficulties of determining the value of emissions to each firm makes command and control regulation less likely to be efficient.

In a carbon tax model, a tax is imposed on carbon emissions produced by a firm. In a cap-and-trade design, the government establishes an emissions cap and allocates to firms emission allowances, which can thereafter be privately traded. Emitters without the required allowances face a penalty more than the price of permits. Assuming all else is equal, the market for permits will automatically adjust the carbon price to a level that ensures that the cap is met. The EU ETS uses this method. In practice, it has resulted in a fairly strong carbon price from 2005 to 2009, but that was later undermined by an oversupply and the Great Recession. Recent policy changes have led to a steep increase of the carbon price since 2018, exceeding 100€ ($118) per ton of CO_{2} in February 2023.

Evaluations of 21 carbon pricing schemes, show that at least 17 of these have caused reductions in greenhouse gas emissions. The achieved emissions reductions range between 5% and 21% for the studied schemes.

The exact monetary damage of the social cost caused by a tonne of CO_{2} depends on climate and economic feedback effects and remains to some degree uncertain. Latest calculations show an increasing trend:

Source	Year	Carbon price per ton of CO_{2}	Remarks
Interagency Working Group (US government)	2013 / 2016	$42	Central estimate for 3% discount rate in 2020
Interagency Working Group (US government)	2013 / 2016	$212	High impact value for 2050 / 3% discount / 95th percentile
German Environmental Agency	2019	$213 (180 €)	With 1% time preference
German Environmental Agency	2019	$757 (640 €)	Without time preference
Kikstra et al.	2021	$3372	Including economic feedbacks

== Implementation ==
Carbon emission trade – allowance prices from 2008

Cap-and-trade systems can include price stability provisions with floor and ceiling limits. Such designs are often referred to as hybrid designs. To the extent the price is controlled by these limits, it can be considered a tax.

=== Carbon tax versus emissions trade ===
Carbon emissions trading works by setting a quantitative limit on the emissions produced by emitters. As a result, the price automatically adjusts to this target. This is the main advantage compared to a fixed carbon tax. A carbon tax is considered easier to enforce on a broad-base scale than cap-and-trade programs. The simplicity and immediacy of a carbon tax has been proven effective in British Columbia, Canada – enacted and implemented in five months. A hybrid cap-and-trade program puts a limit on price increases and, in some cases, sets a floor price as well. The upper limit is set by adding more allowances to the market at a set price while the floor price is maintained by not allowing sales into the market at a price below the floor. The Regional Greenhouse Gas Initiative, for example, sets an upper limit on allowance prices through its cost containment provision.

However, industries may successfully lobby to exempt themselves from a carbon tax. It is therefore argued that with emissions trading, polluters have an incentive to cut emissions, but if they are exempted from a carbon tax, they have no incentive to cut emissions. On the other hand, freely distributing emission permits could potentially lead to corrupt behaviour.

Most cap and trade programs have a descending cap, usually a fixed percentage every year, which gives certainty to the market and guarantees that emissions will decline over time. With a tax, there can be estimates of reduction in carbon emissions, which may not be sufficient to change the course of climate change. A declining cap gives allowance for firm reduction targets and a system for measuring when targets are met. It also allows for flexibility, unlike rigid taxes. Providing emission permits (also called allowances) under emissions trading is preferred in situations where a more accurate target level of emissions certainty is needed.

=== Revenue policies ===
Standard proposals for using carbon revenues include

- a return to the public on a per-capita basis This can compensate the risk of rising energy prices reaching high levels as long as cheap wind and solar power is not available yet. Rich people who tend to have a larger carbon footprint would pay more while poorer people can even benefit from such a regulation.
- subsidies accelerating the transition to renewable energy
- research, public transport, car sharing and other policies that promote carbon neutrality
- subsidies for negative emissions: Depending on the technology, such as PyCCS or BECCS, the cost for generating negative emissions is about $150–165 per ton of CO_{2}. The removal past emissions – 1,700 Gt in total – can theoretically be addressed by auctioning allowances starting with a price that exceeds the removal costs of the proposed emissions.

== Price levels ==
About one third of the systems stays below $10/tCO_{2}, the majority is below $40. One exception is the steep incline in the EU-ETS reaching $60 in September 2021. Sweden and Switzerland are the only countries with more than $100/tCO_{2}.

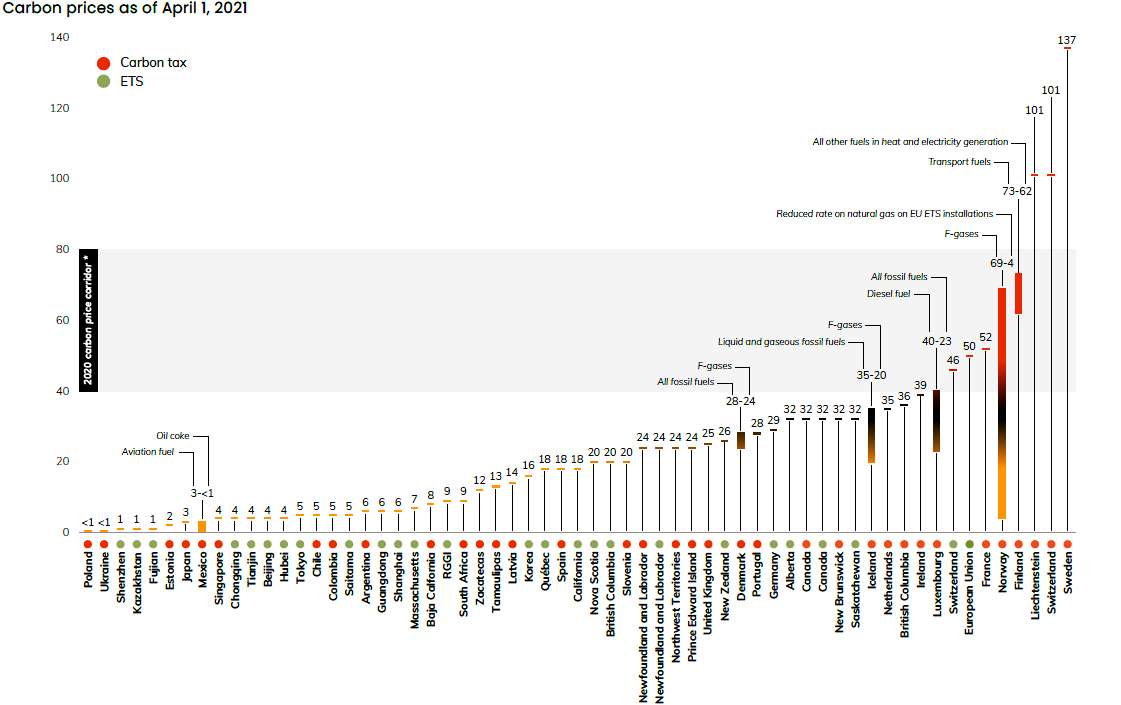
Carbon prices (USD) in 2021

=== Market price surge in fossil fuels ===
Unexpected spikes in natural gas prices and commodities such as oil and coal in 2021 caused a debate whether a carbon price increase should be postponed to avoid additional social burden. A redistribution on a per-capita-basis would even release poorer households which tend to consume less energy compared to wealthier parts of the population. The higher the high carbon price the greater the relief. Looking at individual situations though, the compensation would not apply to commuters in rural areas or people living in houses with poor insulation. They neither have liquidity to invest into solutions using less fossil fuels and would be dependent on credits or subsidies. On the other hand, a carbon price still helps to provide an incentive to use more effective fossil fuel technologies such as CCGT gas turbines in contrast to high-emission coal.

== Scope and coverage ==
In the relevant countries with ETS and taxes, about 40% to 80% of emissions are covered. The schemes differ much in detail. They include or exclude fuels, transport, heating, agriculture or other greenhouse gases apart from CO_{2} like methane or fluorinated gases. In many EU member states like France or Germany, there is a coexistence of two systems: The EU-ETS covers power generation and large industry emissions while national ETS or taxes put a different price on petrol, natural gas and oil for private consumption.

Carbon pricing schemes with more than $2 bn revenue
country / region	type	share	coverage / remarks	revenue 2020
EU	ETS	39%	industry, electricity, intra-EU aviation	$22.5 bn
China	ETS	40%	electricity, district heating	launched 2021
Canada	tax	22%	National pricing in Canada, additional taxes and ETS in provinces	$3.4 bn
France	tax	35%	non EU-ETS	$9.6 bn
Germany	ETS	40%	non EU-ETS: transport, heating	$ 8.75 bn (€7.4 bn) expected, launch 2021
Japan	tax	75%		$2.4 bn
Sweden	tax	40%	transport, buildings, industry, agriculture	$2.3 bn

=== Other taxes and price components ===
The final consumer price for fuels and electric energy depends on individual tax regulations and conditions in each country. Though carbon pricing is playing an increasing role, energy taxes, VAT, utility expenses and other components are still the main cause for completely different price levels between countries.

== Impact on retail prices ==
The table gives examples for a carbon price of $100 or 100 units of any other currency accordingly. Food calculation is all based on CO_{2} equivalents including the high impact of methane emissions.

FUEL	impact
1 L petrol	$0.24
1 L diesel	$0.27

TRANSPORT	impact	remarks
500 km car travel, 1 passenger	$8.40	7 L petrol per 100 km
500 km jet aircraft per seat	$6.70	0.134 kgCO_{2}/km, Domestic flight NZ, A320, 173 seats, all occupied, with radiative forcing multiplier
500 km small aircraft per seat	$32.95	0.659 kgCO_{2}/km, Domestic flight NZ, less than 50 seats, all occupied
5000 km jet aircraft, economy class, per seat	$76.50	0.153 kgCO_{2}/km, >3700 km
5000 km jet aircraft, first class, per seat	$292.50	0.585 kgCO_{2}/km, >3700 km

ELECTRICITY	impact
1 kWh lignite	$0.11
1 kWh hard coal	$0.10
1 kWh natural gas	$0.06
1 kWh natural gas (CCGT)	$0.04

HEAT	impact
1 KWh from natural gas	$0.02
1 KWh from light fuel oil	$0.03
1 L light fuel oil	$0.29

== Economics ==
Many economic properties of carbon pricing hold regardless of whether carbon is priced with a cap or a tax. However, there are a few important differences. Cap-based prices are more volatile and so they are riskier for investors, consumers and for governments that auction permits. Also, caps tend to short-out the effect of non-price policies such as renewables subsidies, while carbon taxes do not.

=== Carbon leakage ===
Carbon leakage is the effect that regulation of emissions in one country/sector has on the emissions in other countries/sectors that are not subject to the same regulation. There is no consensus over the magnitude of long-term carbon leakage.

The leakage rate is defined as the increase in CO_{2} emissions outside the countries taking domestic mitigation action, divided by the reduction in emissions of countries taking domestic mitigation action. Accordingly, a leakage rate greater than 100% means that actions to reduce emissions within countries had the effect of increasing emissions in other countries to a greater extent, i.e., domestic mitigation action had actually led to an increase in global emissions.

Estimates of leakage rates for action under the Kyoto Protocol ranged from 5% to 20% as a result of a loss in price competitiveness, but these leakage rates were considered very uncertain. For energy-intensive industries, the beneficial effects of Annex I actions through technological development were considered possibly substantial. However, this beneficial effect had not been reliably quantified. On the empirical evidence they assessed, Barker et al. (2007) concluded that the competitive losses of then-current mitigation actions, e.g., the EU-ETS, were not significant.

Under the EU ETS rules Carbon Leakage Exposure Factor is used to determine the volumes of free allocation of emission permits to industrial installations.

A general perception among developing countries is that discussion of climate change in trade negotiations could lead to green protectionism by high-income countries Eco-tariffs on imports ("virtual carbon") consistent with a carbon price of $50 per ton of CO_{2} could be significant for developing countries. In 2010, World Bank commented that introducing border tariffs could lead to a proliferation of trade measures where the competitive playing field is viewed as being uneven. Tariffs could also be a burden on low-income countries that have contributed very little to the problem of climate change.

=== Interactions with renewable energy policies ===
Cap-and-trade and carbon taxes interact differently with non-price policies such as renewable energy subsidies. The IPCC explains this as follows:

A carbon tax can have an additive environmental effect to policies such as subsidies for the supply of RE. By contrast, if a cap-and-trade system has a binding cap (sufficiently stringent to affect emission-related decisions), then other policies such as RE subsidies have no further impact on reducing emissions within the time period that the cap applies [emphasis added].

=== Carbon pricing and economic growth ===
According to a 2020 study carbon prices have not harmed economic growth in wealthy industrialized democracies.

In order for such a business model to become attractive, the subsidies would therefore have to exceed this value. Here, a technology openness could be the best choice, as a reduction in costs due to technical progress can be expected. Already today, these costs of generating negative emissions are below the costs of CO_{2} of $220 per ton, which means that a state-subsidized business model for creating negative emissions already makes economic sense today. In sum, while a carbon price has the potential to reduce future emissions, a carbon subsidy has the potential to reduce past emissions.

== Advantages and disadvantages ==
In late 2013, William Nordhaus, president of the American Economic Association, published The Climate Casino, which culminates in a description of an international "carbon price regime". Such a regime would require national commitments to a carbon price, but not to a specific policy. Carbon taxes, caps, and hybrid schemes could all be used to satisfy such a commitment. At the same time Martin Weitzman, a leading climate economist at Harvard, published a theoretical study arguing that such a regime would make it far easier to reach an international agreement, while a focus on national targets would continue to make it nearly impossible. Nordhaus also makes this argument, but less formally.

Similar views have previously been discussed by Joseph Stiglitz and have previously appeared in a number of papers. The price-commitment view appears to have gained major support from independent positions taken by the World Bank and the International Monetary Fund (IMF).

The "Economists' Statement on Climate Change" was signed by over 2500 economists including nine Nobel Laureates in 1997. This statement summarizes the economic case for carbon pricing as follows:

The most efficient approach to slowing climate change is through market-based policies. In order for the world to achieve its climatic objectives at minimum cost, a cooperative approach among nations is required – such as an international emissions trading agreement. The United States and other nations can most efficiently implement their climate policies through market mechanisms, such as carbon taxes or the auction of emissions permits.

This statement argues that carbon pricing is a "market mechanism" in contrast to renewable subsidies or direct regulation of individual sources of carbon emissions and hence is the way that the "United States and other nations can most efficiently implement their climate policies."

Carbon offsets for individuals and businesses may also be purchased through carbon offset retailers like Carbonfund.org Foundation.

A new quantity commitment approach, suggested by Mutsuyoshi Nishimura, is for all countries to commit to the same global emission target. The "assembly of governments" would issue permits in the amount of the global target and all upstream fossil-fuel providers would be forced to buy these permits.

In 2019 the UN Secretary General asked governments to tax carbon.

The economics of carbon pricing is much the same for taxes and cap-and-trade. Both prices are efficient; (Note: ignoring the riskiness of prices under caps) they have the same social cost and the same effect on profits if permits are auctioned. However, some economists argue that caps prevent non-price policies, such as renewable energy subsidies, from reducing carbon emissions, while carbon taxes do not. Others argue that an enforced cap is the only way to guarantee that carbon emissions will actually be reduced; a carbon tax will not prevent those who can afford to do so from continuing to generate emissions.

Besides cap and trade, emission trading can refer to project-based programs, also referred to as a credit or offset programs. Such programs can sell credits for emission reductions provided by approved projects. Generally there is an additionality requirement that states that they must reduce emissions more than is required by pre-existing regulation. An example of such a program is the Clean Development Mechanism under the Kyoto Protocol. These credits can be traded to other facilities where they can be used for compliance with a cap-and-trade program. Unfortunately the concept of additionality is difficult to define and monitor, with the result that some companies purposefully increased emissions in order to get paid to eliminate them.

Cap-and-trade programs often allow "banking" of permits. This means that permits can be saved and can be used in the future. This allows an entity to over-comply in early periods in anticipation of higher carbon prices in subsequent years. This helps to stabilize the price of permits.

== Internal carbon pricing ==
Internal carbon pricing (ICP) can be used as a supplement to carbon pricing enforced externally by national or subnational government institutions, whereby companies assign a monetary value to their greenhouse gas emissions. ICP is a Pigouvian tax that internalizes the environmental and societal damage caused by emitting additional carbon into the atmosphere. ICP is adopted voluntarily and enforced internally by companies, whether or not they are already subject to external carbon pricing. As of 2024, a total of 1,753 companies across 56 countries reported using ICP through the Carbon Disclosure Project (CDP).

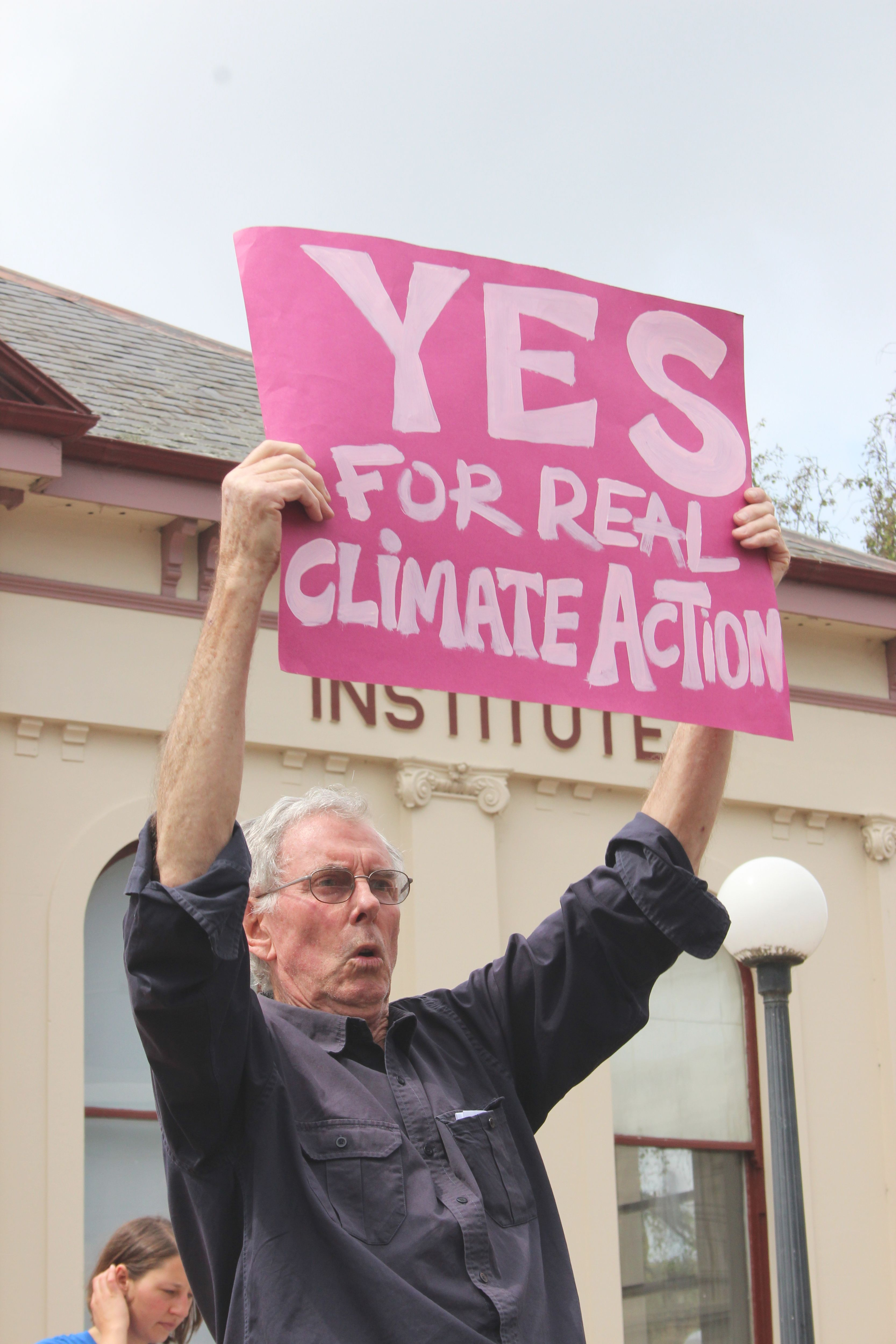
A member of Climate Action Moreland outside of Brunswick Mechanics Institute on Saturday, October 8 2011

The overall goal of ICP is to make it more expensive for companies to use fossil fuels for production. Depending on the type of tool a firm uses, ICP can help them self-regulate their emissions to reach net-zero targets and manage various financial risks posed by climate change. It can also be used to inform scenario planning, drive strategic innovation, and identify potential weaknesses and opportunities for efficiency.

There are several reasons why a company may consider implementing ICP, considering it is a voluntary climate policy. First, stakeholders are increasingly becoming more conscious of the negative impact of carbon footprints and associated risk, and moving away from firms that are perceived as environmentally irresponsible. Consumer demand for more sustainable practices and products have also created opportunities for new markets, motivating companies to participate more in climate mitigation.

=== Implementation ===
There are several types of ICP strategies. The type of method a given company chooses to use depends on the overall goal they are trying to achieve. First, the degree to which they can measure and account for their emissions can limit the type of ICP they can use. This includes whether an oranization's emissions can be traced to certain activities or business units. Another factor that companies may consider is how long it will take for an ICP tool to have a measurable effect on their emissions. They may also opt for one strategy over another depending on the time and resources an organization can dedicate to the planning, implementation, management and adjustment of the ICP over time. The type of method used can also vary depending on the size of a company, the lifecycle of their assets, and the country in which the company is based.

When institutions assemble internal carbon budgets prior to adopting ICP, emissions are sorted into three scopes. Scope 1 includes emissions from generating electricity, heating or steam, combustion fuels, and other physical or chemical processes. Scope 2 includes indirect emissions from purchased electricity and HVAC. Scope 3 encompasses all other indirect emissions. Some examples of Scope 3 emissions are those associated with business trips, employee commuting, transportation of purchased products, and waste.

==== Emissions trading system (ETS) ====
Emissions trading systems (ETS) create a market environment for the trading of emissions certificates between business units or departments within an organization. With this model, a central entity is responsible for allocating emissions via certificates to the participants for a certain period of time. Participants who emit less carbon than they are allocated can sell their remaining certificates to participants who emit more than their allocation. ETS includes cap and trade models as well, where cap defines a maximum allowable amount of emissions and shortage of certificates. The applied cap also helps to develop a market price for emissions certificates. Using ETS helps to minimize the cost of reducing emissions, but the strategy is relatively complicated to implement compared to others. Because it requires intense administrative management, ETS is better suited for large companies or conglomerates with diverse business units.

==== Proxy price ====
Proxy pricing incorporates a pre-defined price for carbon (or other equivalents) emissions into investment decisions. It is generally a way for companies to prepare for future external carbon pricing, and the associated impacts on their internal rate of return on investments. Prices integrated into decision-making frameworks can be based on forecastings for established emissions trading schemes, government policies, the price of purchasing renewable energy, or taxes on certain commodities. Regardless of the metric, proxy prices are typically higher than external carbon fees. With this ICP strategy there is no actual payment of the price of carbon, but using proxy pricing can increase the likelihood that a firm will make decisions associated with lower emissions. It is a relatively easy tool to implement, but it has no short-term impact on institutional carbon emissions. Roughly two-thirds of companies reporting to the CDP use proxy pricing, making it the most commonly-used ICP strategy.

==== Carbon fee ====
A carbon fee, also referred to as a carbon charge or tax, applies a fixed price per metric ton of carbon dioxide (or equivalent) that a company emits. The fee can be applied to all business units or just some selected units. Likewise, different fees can be applied to different business units or activities. The collected funds can be redistributed to the participating units based on defined performance targets or invested in other emissions-reducing initiatives.

Relative to other ICP strategies, carbon fees can be complicated to implement. First, implementing an internal carbon fee requires defining an emissions price and adjustment process over time, which can be difficult to do in the absence of external pricing regulations. Measuring institutional emissions and administrating the collected funds both require resources and expertise. That said, this tool has a greater impact on day-to-day processes and incentivises both short-term and long-term reductions in emissions.

==== Implicit price ====
An implicit carbon price is calculated based on how much a company has already spent on emissions reductions and regulatory compliance. It is unique in the sense that it is based on past decisions rather than future decisions. Using implicit pricing can give firms a better understanding of their carbon footprints and regulatory compliance costs so that they can implement measures to reduce both.

==== Hybrid ====
More than one ICP strategy can be used simultaneously. For example, different carbon fees can be associated with different business units or activities. Carbon fees can also be combined with an ETS to determine a price range for emissions certificates.

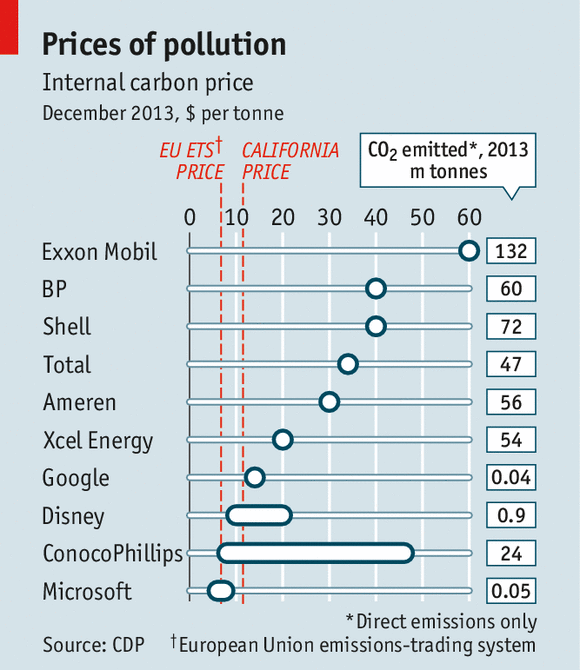
Internal carbon prices set by various US corporations in 2013 (Economist)

=== Price levels ===
The pricing applied in ICPs is not standardized. One common metric used to inform pricing is the social cost of carbon (SCC), which aims to assign a dollar amount to the long term impact of emitting an additional ton of carbon during a given year. Companies have also used the marginal abatement cost, which is an assessment of the cost associated with achieving a particular emissions target. Others look to prices set by industry leaders to inform their ICPs.

Prices used in ICPs generally fluctuate with external markets. Institutions that are based within countries whose governments impose carbon pricing often use higher prices in their ICPs than what is enforced externally. Internal prices also typically rise with national GDP, company size (number of employees), and quality of corporate governance (number of independent board members and percentage of female board members). They also tend to be relatively higher in ICPs adopted in the energy, utilities, and materials sectors.

=== Impacts and limitations ===
ICP appears to be more impactful in large firms whose activities and products are less carbon-intensive. Organizations with clear climate targets prior to adopting ICP are also more likely to achieve greater emissions reductions. An analysis of 500 firms reporting to the CDP from 2011 to 2018 showed that ICP adoption was correlated with a significant decrease in greenhouse gas emissions per unit of revenue and per employee respectively. ICPs can drive investment in research and development (R&D), therefore driving technological innovation and reducing institutional emissions as a result. Another study based on companies reporting to the CDP from 2009-2020 had similar results, and found that reductions in emissions were greater in larger, high-polluting firms. However, they also found that some companies instead suppress R&D investments under ICP models, which results in less emissions reductions than they could potentially achieve. The authors of this study propose that decision-makers in these cases could be prioritizing less expensive investments over those that could achieve greater reductions.

Research on Indian firms shows that adopting ICP can have a significant positive effect on their market value. Adopting an ICP can also moderate the negative influence that high emissions have on firms' market value. An analysis of multinational enterprises across Europe, North America, and Asia suggest that companies using ICP can increase their return on assets by 1%.

Alternatively, some studies have shown that carbon pricing regulations can increase cost burdens for companies depending on their size and sector. For example, implementing an internal carbon fee may be financially infeasible for emissions-intense firms or business units. Some researchers have also voiced concern that ICP could be used as a form of greenwashing. They assert that companies could use ICP to deter governments from enforcing more stringent carbon regulations by signaling that they are doing enough to regulate themselves. Most firms still do not report their emissions, and many of those that disclose using ICP do not report the actual carbon costs they apply to their production activities.
