= Feebate =

Self-financing system of fees and rebates

Feebate is a portmanteau of "fee" and "rebate". A feebate is a policy mechanism that imposes fees on products or activities associated with negative externalities while providing rebates for alternatives that produce fewer or no such externalities. Feebate systems are typically designed to be revenue-neutral, with fees collected funding the rebates provided. Originally coined in the 1970s by Arthur H. Rosenfeld, feebate programs have typically been used to shift buying habits in the transportation and energy sectors.

== Examples ==
California's proposed "Clean Car Discount" program (AB493-Ruskin) was designed to help reduce the state's global warming/greenhouse gas emissions by imposing a fee of up to $2,500 on new, high-carbon-emitting vehicles (starting with 2011 models), and then rebating the fee to buyers of new low-emission vehicles, thereby theoretically shifting the social cost of the destruction of public goods by global warming onto those who contribute to global warming. This Bill failed to pass.

Supporters point towards what they claim are feebates' tendency to promote personal responsibility by having those responsible for the public bad, such as destruction of the environment or harm to private and public property, pay for the externalities that they produce. In the case of personal cars, feebates share some of the same aims as fuel taxes, vehicle registration fees, congestion charging, and road pricing.

In some situations, feebates can be a more efficient or complementary way to promote greater socially desirable outcomes than traditional taxes or quotas. Fuel taxes can create important price signals that can make consumers aware of non-internalized costs of fuel consumption such as greenhouse gasses and other pollutants, and raise funds to offset this externality. But retail consumers have very high discount rates, meaning buyers are not strongly incentivized by additional costs from high gasoline taxes or poor gas mileage when purchasing a car. A feebate can internalize that cost into the initial purchase price, thereby requiring the buyer to prepay for the taking of public and private environmental goods.

Another example of a feebate is proposed in the Rocky Mountain Institute's 2004 publication Winning the Oil Endgame. For each class of car and light truck, a feebate mechanism is used to reward buyers of vehicles that are more fuel efficient than the average vehicle in that class and penalize buyers of less fuel efficient vehicles. This feebate is revenue-neutral, meaning that the amount of money collected through fees (surcharges) equals the amount paid out in rebates.

== See also ==
- Cross subsidization
- Ecotax
- Energy law
- Green economy
- Pigouvian tax
- Tax shift
