= UK–California Climate and Energy Agreement =

Memorandum of Understanding between the Government of the United Kingdom of Great Britain and Northern Ireland and the Government of the State of California of the United States of America
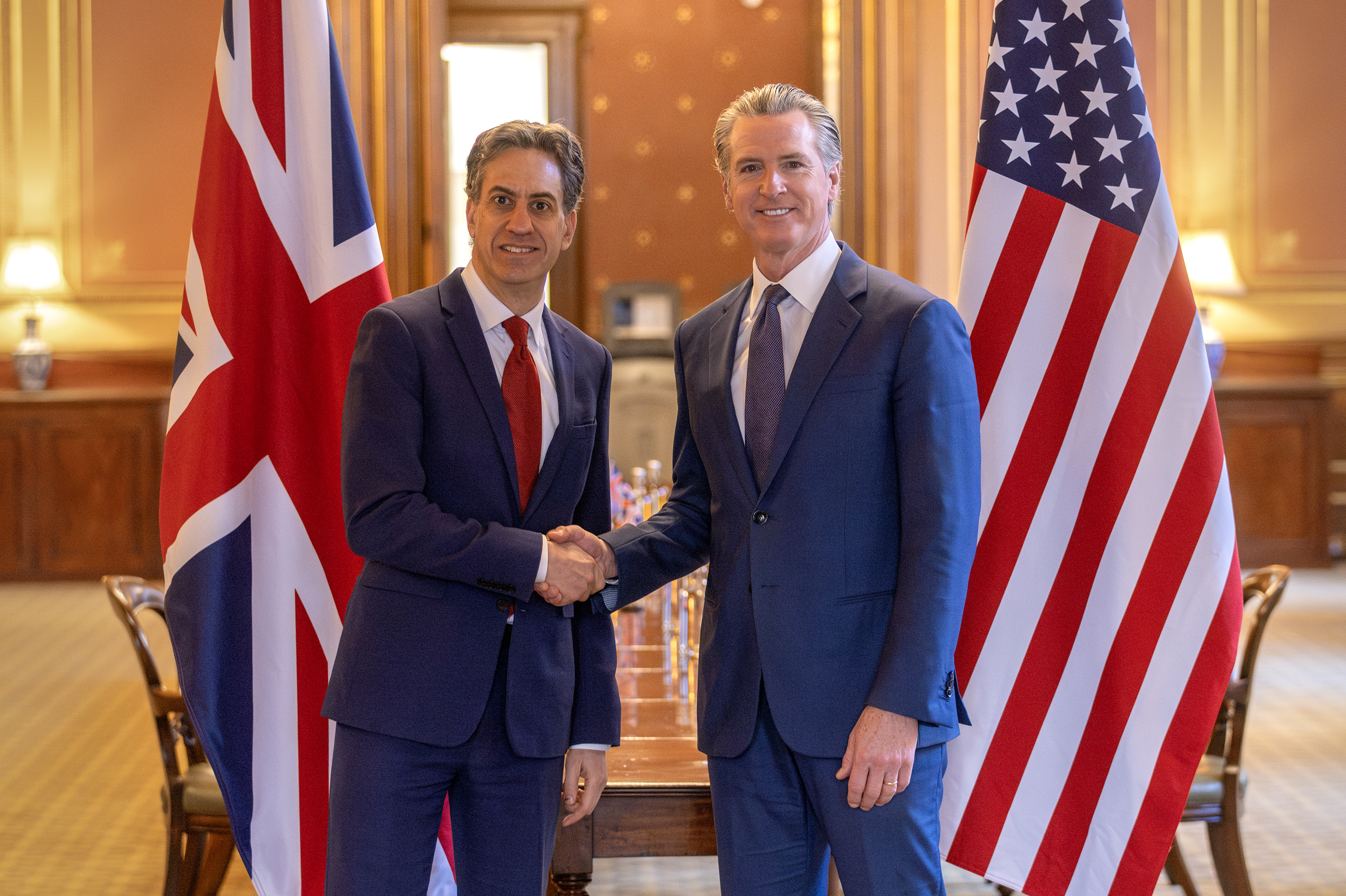
- Type: Memorandum of understanding
- Signed: 16 February 2026
- Location: London, United Kingdom
- Signatories: (United Kingdom) Ed Miliband; (California) Gavin Newsom
- Parties: United Kingdom; California
- Language: English

The UK–California Climate and Energy Agreement is a memorandum of understanding between the United Kingdom (UK) and the U.S. state of California on clean energy, carbon pricing, and climate adaptation.

The agreement was opposed by President Donald Trump who said that it was "inappropriate" for the UK to be dealing with California governor Gavin Newsom.
