= Tax law =

Area of law

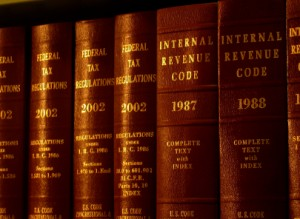
The Internal Revenue Code is the primary statutory basis of federal tax law in the United States. The Code of Federal Regulations is the Treasury Department's regulatory interpretation of the federal tax laws passed by Congress, which carry the weight of law if the interpretation is reasonable. Tax treaties and case law in U.S. Tax Court and other federal courts constitute the remainder of tax law in the United States.

Tax law or revenue law is an area of legal study in which public or sanctioned authorities, such as federal, state and municipal governments (as in the case of the US) use a body of rules and procedures (laws) to assess and collect taxes in a legal context. The rates and merits of the various taxes, imposed by the authorities, are attained via the political process inherent in these bodies of power, and not directly attributable to the actual domain of tax law itself.

Tax law is part of public law. It covers the application of existing tax laws on individuals, entities and corporations, in areas where tax revenue is derived or levied, e.g. income tax, estate tax, business tax, employment/payroll tax, property tax, gift tax and exports/imports tax. There have been some arguments that consumer law is a better way to engage in large-scale redistribution than tax law because it does not necessitate legislation and can be more efficient, given the complexities of tax law.

== Major issues ==
Primary taxation issues differ among various countries, although similarities might exist.

=== Developed countries ===
- Taxes can fail to raise sufficient revenue to cover government spending.
- Taxes are generally complex and can be viewed as benefitting high income earners more than they do to lower income earners (in the payment of relatively less tax).
- Tax evasion and avoidance occur, leading to reduced government revenue.
- Taxes can produce poor desired outcomes (lower productivity and provide less incentive for businesses to grow).
- Taxes can curb economic growth through inefficiency, e.g. corporate taxes/hurdles that could impede smaller entities to grow.
- Taxation can be viewed as disproportionate, as in the case of the taxation of capital gains versus labor income, in which investors generally pay less tax on investment income vs workers who proportionally pay more on their wages.
- Taxes can remain questionable in achieving desired goals, such the Ecotax which is primarily intended to promote environmentally friendly activities via economic incentives.
- Definitions of tax law can be confusing to laypeople and even attorneys who specialize in other areas of law.

=== Developing countries ===
- Taxes in developing economies can be hard to standardize since most workers work in small, and often unregulated enterprises.
- Tax systems without sound establishments and competent administration to run and manage them can be burdensome and inefficient.
- Tax systems without reliable data are hard to regulate and change.
- Tax systems tend to have the rich bear a heavier burden of taxation.

== See also ==
- Corporate law
- Corporate tax
