= Tax shift =

Budget tweak and redistribution of income

Change over time of environmental and labour tax revenues for EU-27 member states. Source: European Environment Agency

Tax shift or tax swap is a change in taxation that eliminates or reduces one or several taxes and establishes or increases others while keeping the overall revenue the same. Specifically, it is often used to refer to increases in indirect tax and a concomitant cut to direct tax rates, or vice versa. The term can refer to desired shifts, such as towards Pigovian (socially efficient) taxes (typically sin taxes and ecotaxes) as well as (perceived or real) undesired shifts, such as an increase in tax burden on households at the expense of large businesses.

== Definition ==
1. Tax shift is a kind of economic phenomenon in which the taxpayer transfers the tax burden to the purchaser or supplier by increasing the sales price or depressing the purchase price during the process of commodity exchange.
2. Tax shift is the redistribution of tax burden. Its economic essence is the redistribution of national income of everyone. The absence of redistribution of national income does not constitute an active of tax shift.
3. Tax shift is an objective process of economic movement. It does not include any emotional factors. Whether taxpayers take the initiative to raise or lower prices or passively accept price fluctuations is not related to tax shift. Whether the economic relationship between the taxpayer and the tax bearer is a class opposition or the unity opposition, it is also unrelated to the tax shift.
4. Tax shift is achieved through price changes. The price mentioned here includes not only the price of the output but also the price of the element. The price changes mentioned here include not only direct price increase and price reduction, but also indirect price increase and price reduction. No price change, no tax shift.

== Characteristics ==
It has the following three characteristics:

1. It is closely linked with price increase and decrease.
2. It is the redistribution of tax burdens among economic entities, and it is also a redistribution of economic interests. The result will inevitably lead to inconsistency between taxpayers and tax bearer.
3. It is the taxpayer's proactive behavior.

== Condition ==
In general, the existence of tax shift mainly depends on the following two conditions:

=== The existence of commodity economy ===
Tax shift is achieved through commodity price changes in commodity exchange. Without the existence of commodity exchange, there would be no tax burden. Therefore, the commodity economy is the economic prerequisite for tax shift. Historically, in a natural economic society based on self-sufficiency, products generally go directly from the production sector to the consumer sector without market exchange. During this period, agriculture is the main sector of the national economy. The state taxation is mainly a tax on land and land production. This part of the tax can only be borne by the landowner, and taxpayers cannot implement tax transfer. With the development of productivity, there has been the production of goods and the exchange of goods. In capitalist society, the commodity economy is highly developed. Under the conditions of commodity economy, the value of all commodities is expressed in the form of currency as the price. The exchange of goods breaks through the limitations of time and area and develops on a large scale. It opens up a vast space for the taxation of goods and commodity circulation. It also makes it possible to pass on commodity taxation, and commodity taxation is also passed back or indirectly through price changes.

=== The existence of a free pricing system ===
Tax shift is directly linked to the price movement, which is usually achieved by increasing the selling rate of sales goods and lowering the purchase price of the purchased good. Among them, the tax burden of some taxes can be directly passed on by changes in prices; the tax burden on some taxes is through changes in capital investment, which affects the supply and demand of commodities indirectly through the changes in prices. Regardless of which form of transfer is adopted, it depends on price changes. Therefore, the free pricing system is the basic condition for tax shift.

The free pricing system refers to a price system in which producers or other market entities can price themselves according to changes in market supply and demand. There are mainly three types of price systems: the government-instructed program price system, the floating price system, and the free price system.

Under the government's mandatory plan price system, the producers, operators and other market entities do not have their own pricing power, prices are directly controlled by the government, and taxpayers cannot pass tax burden through price changes.

Under the floating price system, the government determines the maximum price or minimum price of a commodity. Within the range of fluctuations, the producers, operators and other market entities have a certain amount of freedom in pricing, and tax shift can be realized within a certain extent and within a certain range.

Under the free pricing system, the producers, operators and other market players can freely set prices according to changes in the market supply and demand relationship, and the tax burden can be passed on.

Through the analysis of the conditions for the shift of tax burdens, we can conclude that basically there is still an objective shift of tax burden even if under the highly centralized program management system. After implementing the market economy system, there is an objective shift in tax burden. But the market economy is a highly developed commodity economy. Under this system, the production and business operators of goods and other market entities have their own independent material interests. Profitability has become the fundamental motive for all production and business activities, and the realization of tax burden transfer has become the subjective motivation and desire of various taxpayers. At the same time, with the continuous deepening of the reform of the economic system, the government has liberalized most of the pricing power, and the enterprises have a large amount of free pricing power. The free pricing system based on free prices has basically taken shape, and the conditions for the transfer of taxes have now been met. Therefore, the phenomenon of shifting the tax burden objectively existing in the commodity economy.

== Changes in costs ==
The transfer of tax burdens is related to changes in costs. In the three situations of fixed, increasing and declining costs, tax transfer has different characteristics.

For goods with fixed costs, the tax burden may be all passed on to the buyer. Because the fixed-cost commodity does not increase or decrease its unit cost with the quantity of production. At this time, if the demand is inelastic, the tax can be added to the price to realize the transfer.

For goods with increasing cost, tax burdens can only be partially passed on. Because the unit cost of this commodity increases with the increase in output, the increase in the price of goods after taxation will affect the market. The seller has to reduce production to reduce the cost of products in order to maintain marketability, and thus the tax amount cannot be all passed on.

For goods with diminishing costs, the tax burden can be all passed on to the buyer. Because the unit cost of such goods decreases with the increase in output, if there is no demand elasticity for taxable goods, taxes can also be added to the price and passed on. Under some certain circumstances, taxes can not only be passed on entirely, but even more than the tax price benefit.

== Proposed ==
The following table lists tax shifts that have been proposed or introduced:

Name, location, proponent, source	From	To	Claimed benefits
ATCOR by Mason Gaffney	Nearly all taxes (Note: Although capital can be perfectly elastic, labor technically has finite elasticity. Hence, not all taxes shift to landowners when they are cut, although most of them do.)	Land value tax	economic efficiency, environment, less sprawl, equity, fewer recessions, reduced employment, resource conservation
Green tax shift (see ecotax)	various	ecotax	environment
Tax Shift for the Pacific Northwest (Durning & Bauman 1998)	personal, corporate income tax, payroll tax, property tax, sales tax	carbon tax, pollution tax, traffic tax, sprawl tax (Land value tax), resource consumption tax	environment; public health; reduction of gridlock; countering speculation; equity; administrative ease
Property tax shift (PTS)	sales, income, and buildings	Land value tax	housing supply; sprawl; equity
Philadelphians for Land Value Tax Shift	tax rates on structures	land-value tax	economic development, countering speculation
Illinois	property tax	individual and corporate income tax	extra unearned income for landowners
Mississippi Tennessee	Grocery or food tax	cigarette tax	public health; support for basic needs
Wyoming Tax Swap	sales tax, use tax, and business personal property tax	flat income tax	
FairTax	personal income tax, payroll tax, corporate tax, capital gains tax, self-employment tax, gift tax, estate tax	national retail sales tax with rebate	provide tax burden visibility; reduce compliance costs; global competitiveness

== Other uses ==
Tax swap can also refer to the sale of a security that has declined in price since its purchase and the simultaneous purchase of a similar but not identical security, in order to realize a loss for tax purposes while maintaining a position.

== See also ==
- Ecological economics
- Energy economics
- Environmental economics
- Feebate
- Green economy
- Natural resource economics
- Polluter pays principle
- Single tax
- Tax reform
