= Market intervention =

Modification of market activity

A market intervention is a policy or measure that modifies or interferes with a market, typically done in the form of state action, but also by philanthropic and political-action groups. Market interventions can be done for a number of reasons, including as an attempt to correct market failures, or more broadly to promote public interests or protect the interests of specific groups.

Economic interventions can be aimed at a variety of political or economic objectives including, but not limited to, promoting economic growth, increasing employment, raising wages, raising or reducing prices, reducing income inequality, managing the money supply and interest rates, or increasing profits. A wide variety of tools can be used to achieve these aims such as: taxes or fines, state owned enterprises, subsidies, or regulations such as price floors and price ceilings.

== Basic forms ==
=== Price floor and ceiling ===
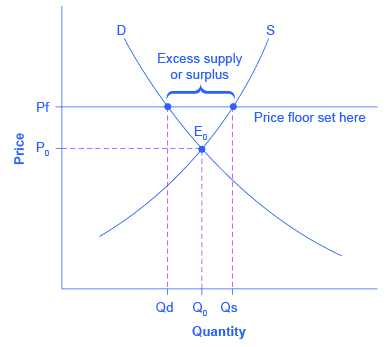
A demonstration of a binding price floor, leading to excess supply

Price floors impose a minimum price at which a transaction may occur within a market. These can be enforced by the government, as well as by non-governmental groups that are capable of wielding market power.

In contrast to a price floor, a price ceiling establishes a maximum price at which a transactions can occur in a market. A serious issue for price floors as well, but especially for price ceilings, is the emergence of black markets for the good or service in question.

=== Quantity ceiling and floor ===
Another possible form of market intervention is a quantity ceiling. This essentially ensures that only a certain quantity of a good or service is produced and traded on a market. An example of such an intervention includes emission permits or credits, whereby some market participants are able to offset their activity by paying other participants to reduce their own quantity.

While theoretically possible, quantity floors are rarer in practice. Such an intervention ensures that the market quantity does not fall below a certain level. Among other methods, this could be achieved by purchasing the marketed product, such as the case of a jobs guarantee that ensures the utilisation of labour. It can also take the form of a legally binding level of producer output, also known as a production quota.

=== Taxation and subsidisation ===
Conventionally, taxation is used as a form of revenue generation; however, it has been observed as long ago as the 14th century that taxation can influence trade and suppress economic activity. In practice, this is sometimes seen as a desirable outcome, and taxes are levied with the intention of stymieing or limiting a market.

Economist Arthur Pigou used the concept of externalities developed by Alfred Marshall to suggest that taxes and subsidies should be used to internalise costs that are not fully captured by existing market structures. In his honour, these have been named Pigouvian taxes and subsidies.

=== Property rights and contracts ===
A significant but often overlooked form of market intervention is the way that social and institutional norms, conventions, or rules can impact the function of markets. Different methods of "tâtonnement" (finding equilibrium) lead to different outcomes as these methods carry different rigidity, search, and menu costs. Together, these form what are referred to as transaction costs, a concept developed among others by American John Commons and further by English economist Ronald Coase.

== Types of market interventions ==
Market interventions include:

- Bailouts pay (usually tax) money to people or organizations in financial difficulty; bail-ins transfer organizations from the ownership of their former shareholders to that of their creditors, cancelling the debt.
- Competition laws aim to increase competition and prevent monopoly and oligopoly
- Copyright grants a legal monopoly a creative work in order to encourage their production.
- Minimum wages create a price floor on labour.
- Monetary policy, such as currency intervention on the foreign exchange market.
- Nationalization transfers a privately held asset into government ownership
- Non-tariff barriers to trade restrict imports and exports by method other than direct taxes
- Patents are legal monopolies granted on practical inventions
- Privatization transfers a government-held thing into private ownership
- Quantitative easing occurs when the government buys government bonds, raising their price and lowering the return per unit price to people and institutions buying government bonds.
- Regulation bans, limits, or requires some market activities
- Subsidies and market/government incentives pay money to produce some desired change in recipients
  - Cross subsidization and feebates are subsidies funded by a linked tax
- Welfare state is government support to individuals, in cash or in kind, often directed at basic needs
- Bank levies are when banks are required to give one-off payments to governments
- Capital levies require people or institutions to pay a one-time taxlike payment, to the government or some institution the government wishes to support; often paid only if above a certain level of wealth
- Taxes are also market interventions.

== See also ==
- Command economy
- Crowding out
- Developmentalism
- Development economics
- Dirigisme
- Indicative planning
- Monetary policy
- Palace economy
- Planned economy
- Reform and opening up
- Regulatory economics
- Rent-seeking
- Social interventionism
