= Pollution Pricing =

Pollution pricing reform (PPR) is the process of adjusting market prices to include direct environmental impact on measurable parameters, as e.g. dust and gas exhaust from combustion engines especially in road traffic. This approach differs from general ecologic taxation schemes, where the measurability of the impact is not available on short term or direct comparison of the tax affected choice for investment or operation.

An externality (a type of market failure) exists where a market price omits pollution raise and affection. In such a situation, rational (self-interested) fiscal or individual decisions can lead to environmental harm, as well as to economic distortions and inefficiencies.

== Pollution adjusted taxation schemes ==
Environmental pricing reform can be economy-wide, or more focused (e.g. specific to a sector (such as electric power generation or traffic) or a particular environmental issue (such as climate change). "Market based instruments" or "economic instrument for environmental protections" may be tailored according to measurable impact of pollution as an escape to the permanent neglection of climate impact by polluting technologies. Examples include green tax-shifting (ecotaxation), tradeable pollution permits, or the creation of markets for ecological technologies.

There are generally three types of options available:

- additional taxation on fuel types with typically higher quantities of dust or polluting gas exhaust.
- annual taxation on engine types with typically higher quantities of dust or polluting gas exhaust after catalysating afterburners.
- daily actualized restriction of traffic according to measured pollution levels.

== See also ==
- Ecopass, an Italian pollution pricing system
- Greenhouse Gas Pollution Pricing Act, a Canadian law

== Literature ==
- Bhola R. Gurjar (Editor), Luisa T. Molina (Editor), C.S. P. Ojha (Editor) Air Pollution: Health and Environmental Impacts 1st Edition. CRC Press. 2010.
- Zev Levin (Editor), William R. Cotton (Editor). Aerosol Pollution Impact on Precipitation: A Scientific Review. November 17, 2008
- Colin Beavan. No Impact Man: The Adventures of a Guilty Liberal Who Attempts to Save the Planet, and the Discoveries He Makes About Himself and Our Way of Life in the Process. May 25, 2010
