= Environmental tax =

Compulsory fee intended to discourage environmentally harmful acts

An environmental tax, ecotax (short for ecological taxation), or green tax is a tax levied on activities which are considered to be harmful to the environment and is intended to promote environmentally friendly alternatives via economic incentives. One notable example is a carbon tax. Such a policy can complement or avert the need for regulatory (command and control) approaches. Often, an ecotax policy proposal may attempt to maintain overall tax revenue by proportionately reducing other taxes (e.g. taxes on wages and income or property taxes); such proposals are known as a green tax shift towards ecological taxation. Ecotaxes can be used to address the failure of free markets to mitigate environmental impacts.

Ecotaxes are examples of Pigouvian taxes, which are taxes on goods whose production or consumption creates external costs or externalities. An example might be philosopher Thomas Pogge's proposed Global Resources Dividend.

== Categories of environmental taxes ==
The term, environmental tax, encompasses an array of different types of taxes used to internalize negative environmental externalities, promote sustainable development, support environmental preservation, and generate revenue. Specifically, environmental taxes can be divided into four main categories, under which all the ecotaxes fall. The categories are energy, transport, pollution and resource taxes.

=== Energy taxes ===
The first type of ecotax, energy taxes, can vary greatly as they can be levied on the production, distribution, or consumption of energy sources, particularly fossil fuels like coal, oil, natural gas, and sometimes electricity. They are often aimed at influencing energy consumption patterns and behaviors, promoting energy efficiency, and encouraging the transition to cleaner and more sustainable energy sources. For example, they can influence energy consumption by levying larger ecotax rates on nonrenewable energy sources, which have a greater negative impact on the environment and contribute to high levels of CO_{2} emissions. This reduces the demand for unclean energy sources, and it can make renewable energy sources relatively more competitive, encouraging investment and consumption in clean energy technologies like solar, wind, hydroelectric, and geothermal power. Globally, the most commonly used environmental taxes fall in the category of "energy" taxes. Energy taxes can be narrowed down further to "energy taxes for stationary purposes", such as taxes on natural gas, coal and biofuels, "energy taxes for transport", with petrol and diesel as the two most relevant examples, and lastly "greenhouse gasses". Apart from the most common energy tax, carbon tax, another popular energy tax is the "coal excise tax" in the United States. The tax is levied on the producers, at the coal's initial sale. Currently, the tax rate, after being increased by over 50% in 2020, is $1.10 per ton for coal from subsurface mines and $0.55 per ton for coal from surface mines.The revenue is generated for a more specific purpose, which is to fund the Black Lung Program and the Black Lung Disability Trust Fund. These entities pay benefits to miners who suffer from black lung disease. The tax continues to generate hundreds of millions of dollars each year despite the coal mining industry contracting, as the yearly revenue has shrunk from $644 million in 2008 to $177 million in 2022. Governments, when imposing ecotaxes for the central purpose of revenue, generally prefer energy taxes when levying environmental taxes due to the fact that energy demand tends to be quite inelastic in the short run, meaning that the government can use such taxes to gain immense revenue. This revenue can be used to reduce the budget deficit, where the majority of it goes to the general fund. However, the revenue earned can also be used to subsidize positive externality generating activities, which is called the "double dividend" of environmental tax. Furthermore, these taxes can reduce deadweight losses caused by negative externalities. For such reasons, many economists support energy taxes along with Environmentalists, where activists often highlight the importance of energy taxes in reducing greenhouse gas emissions and mitigating the impact of climate change, while economists highlight the benefits of the taxes on the economy. Opponents, however, argue such taxes increase the cost of daily necessities, which harm the average consumer, especially those under the poverty line. Additionally, a strong argument against energy taxes is that they can be counterproductive, as it may encourage producers who are being taxed to relocate to countries in which there are weaker, or nonexistent energy taxes. This would negatively impact the domestic economy, as well as the climate, as a result of overambitious energy taxes. This is known as carbon leakage.

=== Transport taxes ===
The second most notable form of environmental tax globally is transport taxes. Such taxes range from being implemented on airplane tickets, to car purchases, or even motor registration. Transport fuels are, however, included in energy taxes.The category mostly consists of taxes on the usage or ownership of vehicles. An example of a common transport tax is the tax placed on vehicle registration. This tax is levied on registrations based on factors such as weight, fuel efficiency, or emissions, and it is used to both generate revenue, and to promote the ownership and usage of cleaner, and more fuel efficient vehicles. Another example is the tax imposed on cars entering areas of congestion, such as certain areas in New York City, and this can even be coupled with an additional ecotax on the usage of certain roads, for example through electronic tolling systems. Collectively, energy and transportation taxes make up the majority of the ecotaxes imposed globally. In 2021, the two taxes made up 96% of the ecotaxes implemented in the EU. The remaining 3% is made up of pollution and resource taxes.

=== Resource and pollution taxes ===
Pollution taxes incorporate taxes on measured emissions to air and water, and the management of waste and noise pollution. An exception is CO_{2} taxes. A successful pollution ecotax is the "plastic bag tax" in Ireland. The country levies a €0.22 tax on plastic bags at the point of sale, with the hope of reducing consumption by reducing the demand for the bags due to the increase in cost. They successfully changed the consumer's behavior, as can be seen by the increase in the use of paper bags, a greener substitute, and due to the fall of plastic bags' contribution to the total litter pollution in Ireland from 5% to 0.13% in 14 years. It has also generated over €200 million in revenue, proving to be a huge revenue source for the government. The final categorization of ecotaxes, and arguably the least important form of ecotaxes is resource taxes. Within the category of resource ecotaxes lie taxes associated with the extraction or utilization of natural resources like water, forests, wildlife, and other forms of flora and fauna. These levies are imposed on activities leading to the depletion of natural resources. Resource taxes are the least prevalent ecotaxes. Resource depletion is usually covered by government fees, for example, determined by the amount and the type of resource extracted, as opposed to imposed taxes.

== Taxes affected ==
Examples of taxes which could be lowered or eliminated by a green tax shift are:

- Payroll, income, and, to a lesser extent, sales taxes.
- Corporate taxes (taxes on investment and entrepreneurship).
- Property taxes on buildings and other infrastructure.

Examples of ecotaxes which could be implemented or increased are:

- Carbon taxes on the use of fossil fuels by greenhouse gases produced. Old hydrocarbon taxes don't penalize greenhouse gas (GHG) production.
- Duties on imported goods containing significant non-ecological energy input (to a level necessary to treat fairly local manufacturers)
- Severance taxes on the extraction of mineral, energy, and forestry products.
- License fees for camping, hiking, fishing and hunting and associated equipment.
- Specific taxes or pollution pricing reform aimed at technologies and products which are associated with substantial negative externalities.
- Waste disposal taxes and refundable fees.
- Steering taxes on effluents, pollution and other hazardous wastes.
- Site value taxes on the unimproved value of land.

== Economic frameworks and strategies employing tax shifting ==
Change over time of environmental and labour tax revenues for EU-27 member states. Source: European Environment Agency

The object of a green tax shift is often to implement a "full cost accounting" or "true cost accounting", using fiscal policy to internalize market distorting externalities, which leads to sustainable wealth creation. The broader measures required for this are also sometimes called ecological fiscal reform, especially in Canada, where the government has generally employed this terminology. In some countries the name is eco-social market economy.

Tax shifting usually includes balancing taxation levels to be revenue-neutral for government and to maintain overall progressiveness. It also usually includes measures to protect the most vulnerable, such as raising the minimum income to file income tax at all, or an increase to pension and social assistance levels to offset increased costs of fuel consumption.

Basic economic theory recognizes the existence of externalities and their potential negative effects. To the extent that green taxes correct for externalities such as pollution, they correspond with mainstream economic theory. In practice, however, setting the correct taxation level or the tax collection system needed to do so is difficult, and may lead to further distortions or unintended consequences.

Taxes on consumption may take the "feebate" approach advocated by Amory Lovins, in which additional fees on less sustainable products—such as sport utility vehicles—are pooled to fund subsidies on more sustainable alternatives, such as hybrid electric vehicles.

However, they may simply act as incentives to change habits and make capital investments in newer more efficient vehicles or appliances or to upgrade buildings. Small changes in corporate tax rates for instance can radically change return on investment of capital projects, especially if the averted costs of future fossil fuel use are taken into account. A 2025 study of 38 OECD countries found a significant long run negative relationship between environmental taxes and carbon dioxide emissions, with stronger emission reductions associated with moderate and high levels of environmental taxation.

The same logic applies to major consumer purchases. A "green mortgage" such as a Location Efficient Mortgage, for example, recognizes that persons who do not drive cars and live generally energy-efficient lifestyles pay far less per month than others and accordingly have more to pay a heftier mortgage bill with. This justifies lending them much more money to upgrade a house to use even less energy overall. The result is a bank taking more per month from a consumer's income as utilities and car insurance companies take less, and housing stock upgraded to use the minimum energy feasible with current technology.

Aside from energy, the refits will generally be those required to be maximally accommodating to remote work, permaculture gardens (for example green roofs), and a lifestyle that is generally localized in the community not based on commuting. It raises real estate valuations for not only the neighborhood but the entire surrounding region. Consumers living sustainable lifestyles in upgraded housing will generally be unwilling to drive around aimlessly shopping, for instance, to save a few dollars on their purchases. Instead, they'll stay nearer to home and create jobs in grocery delivery and small organic grocers, spending substantially less money on gasoline and car operation costs even if they pay more for food.

== Progressive or regressive? ==
Some green tax shift proposals have been criticized as being fiscally regressive (a tax with an average tax rate that decreases as the taxpayer's income increases). Taxing negative externalities usually entails exerting a burden on consumption, and since the poor consume more and save or invest less as a share of their income, so that any shift towards consumption taxes can be regressive. In 2004, research by the Policy Studies Institute and Joseph Rowntree Foundation indicated that flat rate taxes on domestic rubbish, energy, water and transport use would have a relatively higher impact on poorer households.

== Ecotax policies enacted ==
An ecotax has been enacted in Germany by means of three laws in 1998, 1999 and 2002. The first introduced a tax on electricity and petroleum, at variable rates based on environmental considerations; renewable sources of electricity were not taxed. The second adjusted the taxes to favor efficient conventional power plants. The third increased the tax on petroleum. At the same time, income taxes were reduced proportionally so that the total tax burden remained constant.

The regional government of Balearic Islands (then held by an ecosocialist coalition) established an ecotax in 1999. The Balearic Island suffer a high human pressure from tourism, that at the same time provides the main source of income. The tax (€1.00 per person per day) would be paid by visitors staying at tourist resorts. This was criticized by the conservative opposition as contrary to business interests, and they abolished the tax in 2003 after seizing back the government.

A variety of ecotaxes (often called "severance taxes") have been enacted by various states in the United States. The Supreme Court of the United States held in Commonwealth Edison Co. v. Montana, 453 U.S. 609 (1981), that in the absence of federal law to the contrary, states may set ecotaxes as high as they wish without violating the Commerce Clause or the Supremacy Clause of the United States Constitution.

Starting from January 1, 2018, China's first green tax aimed at environmental protection, the Environmental Protection Tax, was officially implemented, replacing the pollution discharge fee system that had been in place for nearly 40 years. The environmental protection tax is declared and paid quarterly, and the first collection period will be from April 1 to 15, 2018. The scope of taxation is air, water, solid and noise pollutants directly discharged into the environment. At present, except for the Tibet Autonomous Region, all provinces, autonomous regions and municipalities have issued specific applicable tax amounts for taxable air pollutants and water pollutants in their regions in accordance with legal procedures.

== Worldwide implementation ==
=== United Kingdom ===
In 1993, the conservative government introduced the Fuel Price Escalator, featuring a small but steady increase of fuel taxes, as proposed by Weizsäcker and Jesinghaus in 1992. The FPE was stopped in 2000, following nationwide protests; while fuel was relatively cheap in 1993, fuel prices were then among the highest in Europe. Under the 1997–2007 Labour government, despite Gordon Brown's promise to the contrary, green taxes as a percentage of overall taxes had actually fallen from 9.4% to 7.7%, according to calculations by Friends of the Earth.

In a 2006 proposal, the U.K.'s then-Environment Secretary David Miliband had the government in discussions on the use of various green taxes to reduce climate-changing pollution. Of the proposed taxes, which were meant to be revenue-neutral, Miliband stated: "They're not fundamentally there to raise revenue."

Miliband provided additional comments on their need, saying: "Changing people's behaviour is only achieved by "market forces and price signals", and "As our understanding of climate change increases, it is clear more needs to be done."

=== Ukraine ===
Starting in 1999, the Ukrainian government has been collecting an ecological tax, officially known as Environmental Pollution Fee (Ukrainian: Збір за забруднення навколишнього природного середовища), which is collected from all polluting entities, whether it's one-time or ongoing pollution and regardless of whether the polluting act was legal or illegal at the time.

=== India ===
The Ministry of Environment and Forests, Government of India, asked Madras School of Economics, Chennai, to undertake a study of taxes on polluting inputs and outputs in 2001. Raja Chelliah, Paul Appasamy, U.Sankar and Rita Pandey (Academic Foundation, 2007, New Delhi) recommended eco taxes on coal, automobiles, chlorine, phosphate detergents, chemical pesticides, chemical fertilizers, lead acid batteries and plastics. See Ecotaxes on polluting inputs and outputs, Academic Foundation, New Delhi, 2007. The Finance Minister introduced a coal cess at the rate of Rs 50 per ton in 2010.

=== China ===
The Standing Committee of the National People's Congress enacted a set of environmental regulations and taxes in 1979, labelled as the 'Pollutant Discharge Fee' (PDF). The Pollutant Discharge Fee, has proved to work in some parts of the country such as Northern China, however has shown adverse effects in parts such as the Karst region of Southwest China, as the area has had a boom in industrialisation and urbanisation, which has caused regional water shortage and pollution.

On 1 January 2018, China replaced its existing, long-lasting "Pollutant Discharge Fee" system, with an environmental protection tax which was set to put in place a "green" financial and taxation system, whilst encouraging pollution control and the treatment of polluted areas. The new tax has also helped battle problems from the Pollutant Discharge Fee, such as local governments exploiting loopholes in the system and sparing big companies from legal trouble. This new law provides five types of exemptions, including, among others, exemptions for eligible agricultural pollution, pollution from transportation, and pollution from sewage and household waste. Taxpayers may also enjoy a 25% reduction in return for cutting down their air and water pollution by 30% or more, below the proscribed level.

According to data released by the Ministry of Finance of China, China's environmental protection tax will collect 20.5 billion yuan (RMB, the same below) in 2023, and 5.1 billion yuan in January and February 2024. Before the environmental protection tax was levied, many Chinese companies had to pay pollution discharge fees. Six years ago, the finance department of a thermal power plant in Chongqing calculated that if the power generation remained unchanged, the environmental protection tax to be paid would double the original pollution discharge fee. Transformation is imminent. The reason why thermal power plants are criticised for "high pollution" is that the key is backward technology, such as incomplete coal combustion and lack of flue gas treatment equipment. The power plant has carried out ultra-low emission transformation on all six generating units and added wind and dust suppression nets in the coal yard. The effect is immediate. In 2018, the first year of the implementation of the Environmental Protection Tax Law, the pollution equivalents generated by power plants decreased by 73.1% compared with 2017, and the environmental protection tax paid was 2.14 million yuan, which was 73% lower than the pollution discharge fee of 7.96 million yuan paid in 2017. If the enterprise is identified as an advanced manufacturing industry, it can even enjoy the advanced manufacturing industry value-added tax additional deduction policy.

=== France ===
The French government shared its intentions to establish a new fee on plane tickets with the purpose to fund environment-friendly alternatives, such as eco-friendly transport infrastructure, including rail. The proposed tax would range between 1.50 euros ($1.7) and 18 euros ($20) and apply to most flights departing from France. The French government expects the new tax to raise over 180 million euros ($200 million) from 2020.

==== The carbon tax ====
The carbon tax was implemented in 2014 after two unsuccessful attempts. It is not a specific tax but a component of domestic consumption taxes on fossil fuels, proportional to their carbon content. It is based on the "polluter pays" principle, according to which all persons must contribute to the repair of the damage they cause to the environment . It puts a price on each ton of CO_{2} emitted to encourage consumers to move away from certain products or behaviors with high greenhouse gas emissions. In other words, to reduce the use of fossil fuels. It is a Pigouvian tax that encourages quantifying the costs of negative externalities of goods and services.

The carbon tax is a "carbon component" integrated into the more global calculation of the domestic consumption tax on energy products, natural gas and coal. It is indexed to the carbon price, which serves as a climate reference for investment choices by public and private economic actors and is expressed in euros per ton of CO_{2}. The carbon tax takes the form of a fee rather than a tax or an environmental tax in the strict sense of the word. It is a non-mandatory levy paid only by the use of a polluting service or good

===== Taxpayers =====
The tax is paid by households (on gasoline or gas for example), companies and administrations. However, there are many exceptions: the most polluting large industries are subject to European regulations; air and sea transport are exempted by virtue of international agreements and European directives; national river transport, cabs, road transport of goods, public transport as well as agricultural uses are also exempted from this tax.

===== Results =====
Nearly 4 million tons of CO_{2} were avoided by France in 2018 thanks to its carbon tax, according to an OECD study, which represents a 5% reduction in emissions from the manufacturing sector between 2014 and 2018.

===== Reception by the public =====
The rapid increase in this tax (from 7 euros per ton in 2014 to 14 in 2015 and 44.6 euros in 2018) caused gasoline prices to explode, which, coupled with the increase in the price of petroleum products and natural gas, contributed to the birth of the yellow vest movement.

== See also ==
- Carbon fee and dividend
- Carbon tax
- Electronic Waste Recycling Fee
- Energy Tax Act
- Environmental crime
- Environmental tariff
- Feebate
- Free-market environmentalism
- Geolibertarianism
- Georgism
- Green politics
- Jet fuel tax
- Land value tax
- Market governance mechanism
- Pigovian tax
- Severance tax
