= Social cost =

Concept in neoclassical economics

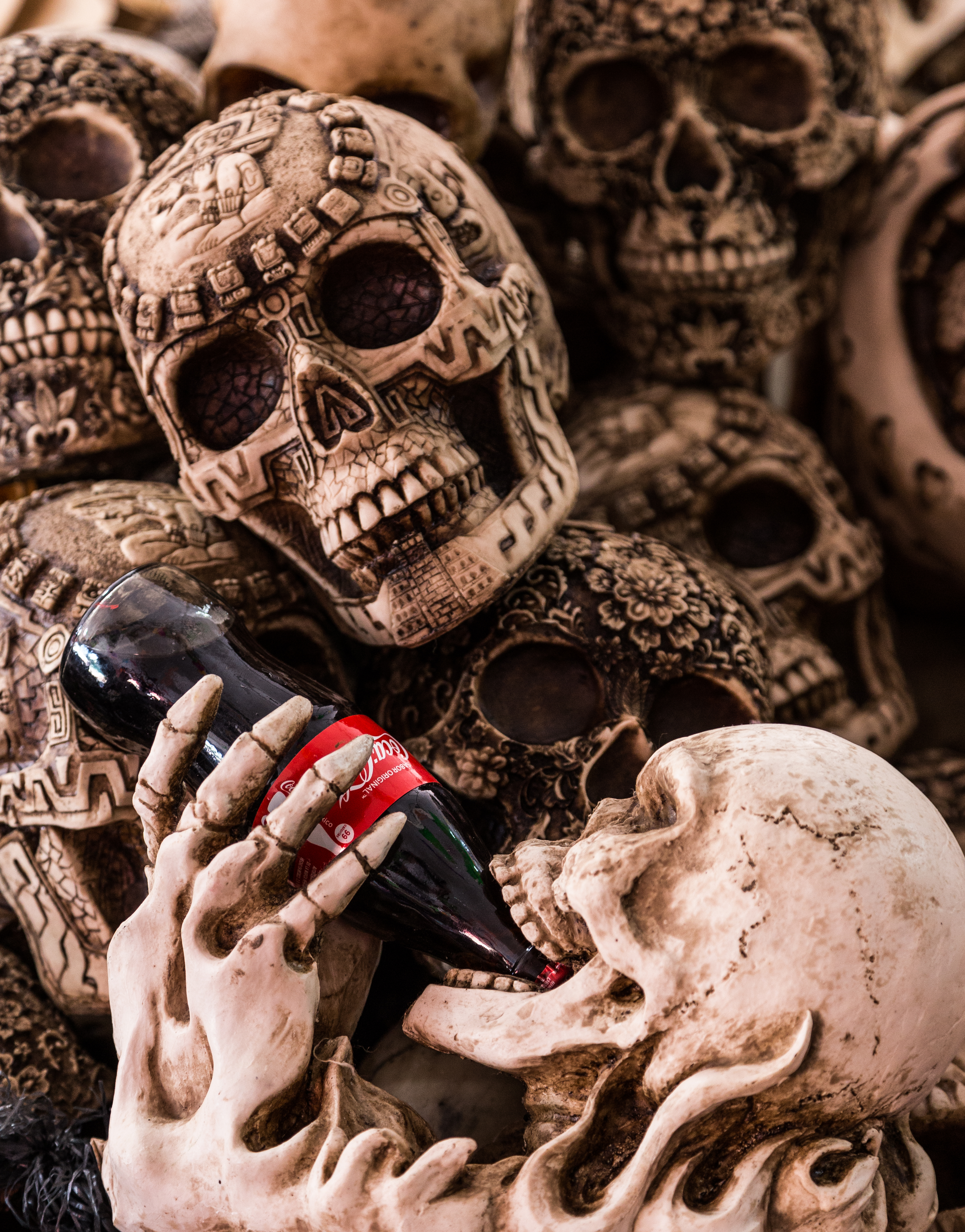
A depiction of skeletons with a Coca-Cola bottle at Alfeñique fair in Mexico appears to criticize the social costs of sweetened beverage consumption.

Social cost in neoclassical economics is the sum of the private costs resulting from a transaction and the costs imposed on the consumers as a consequence of being exposed to the transaction for which they are not compensated or charged. In other words, it is the sum of private and external costs. This might be applied to any number of economic problems: for example, social cost of carbon has been explored to better understand the costs of carbon emissions for proposed economic solutions such as a carbon tax.

Private costs refer to direct costs to the producer for producing the good or service. Social cost includes these private costs and the additional costs (or external costs) associated with the production of the good which are not accounted for by the free market. In short, when the consequences of an action cannot be taken by the initiator, we will have external costs in the society. We will have private costs when initiator can take responsibility for agent's action.

== Definitions ==
Mathematically, social marginal cost is the sum of private marginal cost and the external costs. For example, when selling a glass of lemonade at a lemonade stand, the private costs involved in this transaction are the costs of the lemons and the sugar and the water that are ingredients to the lemonade, the opportunity cost of the labor to combine them into lemonade, as well as any transaction costs, such as walking to the stand. An example of marginal damages associated with social costs of driving includes wear and tear, congestion, and the decreased quality of life due to drunks driving or impatience, and many people displaced from their homes and localities due to construction work. Another social cost of driving includes the pollution driving costs to other people in the society. For both private costs and external costs, the agents involved are assumed to be optimizing.

== Alternatives ==
The alternative to the above neoclassical definition is provided by the heterodox economics theory of social costs by K. William Kapp. Social costs are here defined as the socialized portion of the total costs of production, i.e., the costs which businesses shift to society in their attempts to increase their profits. In this sense Kapp's understanding of social costs is consistent with the "Social Costs of Carbon" calculations below because these costs arise primarily from carbon-based production (not exchange) and are shifted to society. Different from "social cost of carbon arguments" the cause of social costs is identified in existing capitalist accounting laws which allow producers to leave them unpaid. Due to its mode of economic calculation and accounting capitalism is essentially a system of cost shifting. Legalized cost shifting is one of the main sources of profits.

== Economic theory ==
According to the International Monetary Fund, "there are differences between private costs and the costs to the society as a whole". In a situation where there are positive social costs, it means that the first of the Fundamental theorems of welfare economics failed in that relying merely on private markets for price and quantity lead to an inefficient outcome. Market failures or situations in which consumption, investment, and production decisions made by individuals or firms result in indirect costs i.e. have an effect on parties external to the transaction are one of the most common reasons for government intervention. In economics, these indirect costs which lead to inefficiencies in the market and result in a difference between the private costs and the social costs are called externalities. Thus, social costs are the costs pertaining to the transaction costs to the society as a whole. Generally, social costs are easier to think about in marginal terms i.e. marginal social cost. Marginal social cost refers to the total costs that the society pays for the production of an extra unit of the good or service in question. Mathematically, this can be represented by Marginal Social Cost (MSC) = Marginal Private Cost (MPC) + Marginal External Costs (MEC).

Social costs can be of two types—Negative Production Externality and Positive Production Externality. Negative Production Externality refers to a situation in which marginal damages are social costs to society that result in Marginal Social Cost being greater than the Marginal Private Cost i.e. MSC > MPC. Intuitively, this refers to a situation in which the production of the firm reduces the well-being of the people in the society who are not compensated for the same. For example, steel production results in a negative externality because of the marginal damages pertaining to pollution and negative environmental effects. Steelmaking results in indirect costs as a result of emission of pollutants, lower air quality, etc. For example, these indirect costs might include the health of a homeowner near the production unit and higher healthcare costs which have not been factored into the free market price and quantity. Given that the producer does not bear the burden of these costs, they are not passed down to the end user thus creating a situation where MSC > MPC.

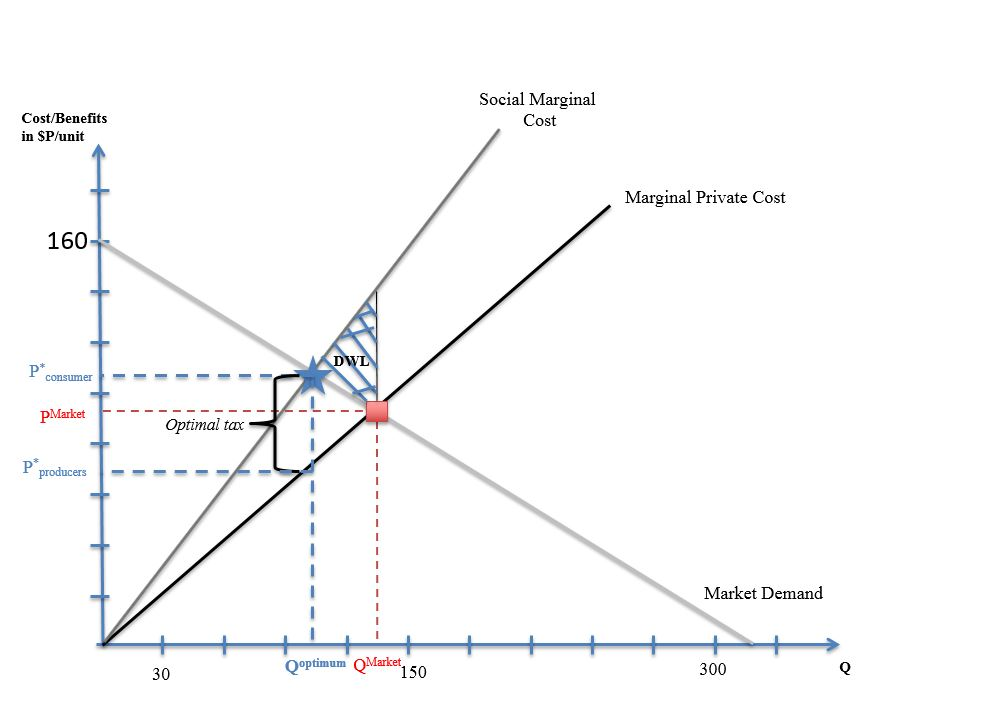
An illustration in which the marginal social costs exceed marginal private costs by the marginal external costs (or marginal damages). This is known as a negative production externality.

This example can be better elucidated with a diagram. Profit-maximizing organizations in a free market will set output at Q^{Market} where marginal private costs (MPC) is equal to marginal benefit (MB). Intuitively, this is the point on the diagram where the private supply curve (MPC) and consumer demand curve (MB) intersect i.e. where consumer demand meets firm supply. This results in a competitive market equilibrium price of p^{Market}.

In the presence of a negative production externality, the private marginal cost increases i.e. shifted upwards to the left by marginal damages to yield the marginal social curve. The star in the diagram, or the point where the new supply curve (inclusive of marginal damages to society) and the consumer demand intersect, represents the socially optimum quantity Q^{optimum} and price. At this social optimum, the price paid by the consumer is p^{*}_{consumer} and the price received by the producers is p^{*}_{producer}.

High positive social costs, in the form of marginal damages, lead to an over-production. In the diagram, there is overproduction at Q^{Market} - Q^{optimum} with an associated deadweight loss of the shaded triangle. One of the public sector remedies for internalizing externalities is a corrective tax. According to neoclassical economist Arthur Pigou, in order to correct this market failure (or externality) the government should levy a tax which equals to marginal damages per unit. This would effectively increase the firm's private marginal so that SMC = PMC.

The prospect of government intervention in regards to correcting an externality has been hotly debated. Economists like Ronald Coase contend that the market can internalize an externality and provide for an external outcome through bargaining among affected parties. For example, in the above-mentioned case, the homeowners could negotiate with the pollution firm and strike a deal in which they would pay the firm not to pollute or to charge the firm for pollution; the outcome pertaining to who pays is determined by bargaining power. According to Thomas Helbing at the International Monetary Fund, government intervention might be most optimal in situations where one party might have undue bargaining power compared to the other party.

In an alternative scenario, positive production externality occurs when the social costs of production are lower than the marginal private costs of production. For example, the social benefit of research and development not only applies to the profits made by the firm but also helps improve the health of society through better quality of life, lower healthcare costs, etc. In this case, the marginal social cost curve would shift downwards and there would be underproduction. In this case, government intervention would result in a Pigouvian subsidy in order to decrease the firm's private marginal cost so that MPC = SMC.

== Issues ==
Quantification of social costs, for damages or benefits in the future resulting from current production, is a critical problem for the presentation of social costs and when attempting to formulate policy to correct the externality. For example, damages to the environment, socioeconomic or political impacts, and costs or benefits that span long horizons are difficult to predict and quantify. Thus, it is difficult to include in a cost-benefit analysis.

Another example concerning the difficulty surrounding the estimation of social costs is the social cost of carbon. In trying to monetize the social costs arising from carbon, one needs to understand "the effect of a ton of a greenhouse gas on global temperatures, the effect of temperature change on agricultural yields, human health, flood risk, and myriad other harms to the ecosystem". Analysts from Brookings Institution contend that one of the reasons the estimation of the social cost of carbon is incredibly complex is that the external costs imposed on society as a result of the transactions of one firm in China, for example, impact the quality of lives and health of consumers living in the United States.

Social costs are also linked with the analysis of market failure. Take the national dividend, for example; to maximize the national dividend, it is required that one set marginal social costs and marginal social benefits equal to each other. Marginal private costs and marginal private benefits also need to be equal to each other to maximize market behaviors. However, the market will not be maximized without both sets of costs and benefits equal to each other.

== Applications ==
Social cost has been applied on a number of different critical social issues. Notably the social cost of carbon and monopolies are common topics of exploration.

=== Carbon ===
The social cost of carbon (SCC) is an estimate, typically expressed in dollars, of the economic damages associated with emitting one additional ton of carbon dioxide into the atmosphere. By translating the effects of climate change into monetary terms, the SCC provides policymakers with a tool to assess the potential impacts of actions that increase or reduce greenhouse gas emissions. It is commonly used in regulatory impact analyses to inform investment decisions, cost-benefit assessments, and climate policy development.

== See also ==
- Bargaining power
- Economic interventionism
- Environmental economics
- Environmental full-cost accounting
- Public bad
- ISO 26000
- Public economics
- Supply and demand
- Shadow wage
