= Sugar tax =

Sugar Tax may refer to:

== Taxation ==
- A sugary drink tax
- UK sugary drink tax, a tax on sugary drinks included in the 2016 United Kingdom budget
- Sugar Act, a 1700s UK law

== Music ==
- Sugar Tax (album), an album by Orchestral Manoeuvres in the Dark
- "Sugar Tax", a song by Orchestral Manoeuvres in the Dark from the B-side of "Then You Turn Away"
