= Pigouvian tax =

Tax on activity generating negative externalities

A Pigouvian tax (also spelled Pigovian tax) is a tax on a market activity that generates negative externalities, that is, costs incurred by third parties. It imposes costs corresponding with the externalities, internalizing those costs to improve Pareto efficiency. Ideally, the tax is set equal to the external marginal cost of the negative externalities, in order to correct an undesirable or inefficient market outcome (a market failure).

In the presence of negative externalities, parties who did not consent to the transaction or activity, and did not receive payment, nevertheless incur some of the costs, so the total cost is not covered by the private cost of the activity. In such a case, the market outcome is not efficient and may lead to a harmful excess of the activity. Examples of negative externalities are environmental pollution and increased public healthcare costs associated with tobacco and sugary drink consumption.

Conversely, in the presence of positive externalities, those who did not directly participate in the market activity, or contribute to the production, receive some benefit, and the market may under-produce. This suggests a Pigouvian subsidy to help consumers pay for socially beneficial products and encourage increased production to generate more positive societal benefits.

Examples are a subsidy for flu vaccines, for research and development, and for public goods such as education and national defense.

Pigouvian taxes are named after the English economist Arthur Cecil Pigou (1877–1959), who developed the concept of economic externalities. William Baumol was instrumental in framing Pigou's work in modern economics in 1972.

== Pigou's original argument ==
In 1920, the British economist Arthur Cecil Pigou published The Economics of Welfare. In it, he argues that industrialists seek their own marginal private interest. When the marginal social interest diverges from the marginal private interest, the industrialist has no incentive to internalize the marginal social cost. Conversely, Pigou argues, if an industry produces a marginal social benefit, the individuals receiving the benefit have no incentive to pay for that service. Pigou refers to these situations as incidental uncharged disservices and incidental uncharged services, respectively.

Pigou provides numerous illustrations of incidental uncharged disservices. For example, if a contractor builds a factory in the middle of a crowded neighborhood, the factory causes these incidental uncharged disservices: higher congestion, loss of light, and a loss of health for the neighbors. He also references businesses that sell alcohol. The sale of alcohol necessitates higher costs in policemen and prisons, Pigou argues, because of the crime associated with alcohol. In other words, the net private product of alcohol businesses is peculiarly large relative to the net social product of the same business. He suggests that this is why most countries tax alcohol businesses.

The divergence between the marginal private interest and the marginal social interest produces two primary results. First, as already noted, the party receiving the social benefit does not pay for it, and the one creating the social harm does not pay for it. Second, when the marginal social cost exceeds the marginal private benefit, the cost-creator over-produces the product. Ultimately, because non-pecuniary externalities overestimate the social value, they are over-produced.

To deal with over-production, Pigou recommends a tax placed on the offending producer. If the government can accurately gauge the social cost, the tax could equalize the marginal private cost and the marginal social cost. In more specific terms, the producer would have to pay for the non-pecuniary externality that it created. This would effectively reduce the quantity of the product produced, moving the economy back to a healthy equilibrium.

== Working of the Pigouvian tax ==
Pigouvian tax effect on output

A tax shifts the marginal private cost curve up by the amount of the externality. If the tax is placed on the quantity of emissions from the factory, the producers have an incentive to reduce output to the socially optimum level. If the tax is placed on the percentage of emissions per unit of production, the factory has the incentive to change to cleaner processes or technology.

== Taxing proxies ==
Taxing proxies for the negative externalities, such as taxing production as a proxy for emissions, has been argued to sometimes fail to deliver efficient market outcomes. Even less effective are lump-sum taxes on industry participation, such as licensing, especially when the number of firms can vary.

Pigouvian tax on measures of emissions themselves (or the relevant negative externalities) can create the long-run efficient market and social optimum.

== Double-dividend hypothesis ==
The double-dividend hypothesis proposes that a revenue-neutral substitution of environmental taxes for revenue-raising taxes might offer two benefits. The idea was first advanced by Tullock (1967) in a paper titled "Excess Benefit". The first benefit (or dividend) is the benefit or welfare gain resulting from a better environment and less pollution (caused by a Pigouvian tax imposed on the producer), and the second dividend or benefit is a more efficient tax system due to a reduction in the distortions of the revenue-raising tax system, which also produces an improvement in welfare. This idea received scant attention until the early 1990s when the economics of climate change attracted attention to the topic of environmental taxes. The concept of "double dividend" became widely used following its introduction by David Pearce in 1991. Pearce noted that estimates of the marginal excess burden (marginal distortionary cost) of existing levels of taxation in the US economy are between 20 and 50 cents per dollar of revenue collected. Because the revenue from the carbon tax would be recycled (used to lower preexisting and distorting taxes), the policy would be revenue-neutral, and the secondary benefit from revenue recycling would justify an even higher carbon tax. It is generally accepted now that the magnitude of the "revenue-recycling" benefit is lower than the 20–50 cents per dollar of revenue, but there are differing views on whether the second effect is positive or negative. The line of argument suggesting that the second "benefit" is negative proposes a previously unrecognized "tax interaction effect" (Bovenberg and de Mooij 1994).

In a 1997 paper, Don Fullerton and Gilbert E. Metcalf evaluated the double dividend hypothesis. They define the double-dividend hypothesis as the theory that environmental taxes can improve the environment and increase economic efficiency simultaneously. Either motivation can legitimately support a tax reform. The first dividend intuitively makes sense: decreasing pollutant emissions improves the environment. The improvement in economic efficiency results from a shift away from distorting taxes such as the income tax. Fullerton and Metcalf note that for every $1 extracted in taxes, a $1.35 burden falls on the economy. In a sense, the private sector must swallow a 35 cent excess burden for no particular reason. The second dividend aims to eliminate some of this excess burden.

Fullerton and Metcalf argue, the validity of the double-dividend theory cannot be established as a whole. This does not imply that the double dividend hypothesis is untenable but there is just more complication to that. An observer must evaluate each circumstance individually. Fullerton and Metcalf do provide guidelines for this analysis. Two questions help shape this analysis: what is the status quo? What are the specifics of the reform? The amount and nature of the current taxes, permits, and regulations greatly influence the results of the additional tax. Also, where the tax revenue goes greatly affects the success of the tax.

Secondly, Fullerton and Metcalf say the previous literature on Pigouvian taxes focused too heavily on the revenue dividend and too lightly on the environmental dividend of environmental taxes. Their predecessors naively value revenue too much, Fullerton and Metcalf argue, because they fail to recognize that all taxes impose costs on someone. These taxes could outweigh the environmental benefit. Thus, the government must use the Pigouvian tax revenue to lower another tax if it wants to minimize the economic damage of a tax.

Fullerton and Metcalf also mention that the effectiveness of any sort of Pigouvian tax depends on whether it supplements or replaces an existing pollution regulation. If the tax replaces a pollution regulation, it will most likely be environmentally neutral, even if it is revenue-positive. If it supplements the regulation, it may or may not be environmentally and revenue-neutral, depending on the effectiveness of the original regulation. The status quo substantially affects the outcome of a proposed tax.

== Distortionary taxation ==
A. Lans Bovenberg and Ruud A. Mooij argue that there is a first-best case scenario and a second-best case scenario in their article "Environmental Levies and Distortionary Taxation." In the first-best case, the government does not need to get revenue from distortionary taxes such as the income tax, and the Pigouvian tax can create the long-run social optimum. In the real world, second-best case, the status quo includes an income tax that distorts the labor supply. In this situation, Bovenberg and Mooij write that the best tax comes in below the level of the Pigouvian tax.

Bovenberg and Mooij establish that households consume a dirty good (D) and a clean good (C). If the government taxes D, it can use the earned revenue to lower the labor income tax. At the same time, the tax levied on the firm will increase the price of D. The lowered income tax and the higher consumer prices even each other out, stabilizing the real net wage. But because C's price has not changed and it can substitute for D, consumers will buy C instead of D. Suddenly the government's environmental tax base has eroded and its revenue with it. The government then cannot afford to keep the labor income tax down. Bovenberg and Mooij posit that the increase in the price of goods will outweigh the slight decrease in the income tax. Labor and leisure become more interchangeable the lower the real net wage (or after-tax wage) falls. With this decrease in the real net wage, more people leave the job market. Ultimately, labor bears the cost of all public goods.

Goulder, Parry, and Burtraw agree that the net social welfare after the implementation of a tax hinges on the preexisting tax rate. Don Fullerton agreed with this analysis in 1997 in his article "Environmental Levies and Distortionary Taxation: Comment". He added that lowering the income tax and taxing the dirty good equates with raising the labor tax and subsidizing the clean product. These two policies create the same effects, Fullerton says.

In 1998, Fullerton and Gilbert E. Metcalf explain this theory more thoroughly. They begin by defining terms. The gross wage reflects the pre-tax wage a laborer receives. The simplest form of the net wage is the pre-tax wage minus the income tax. In reality, however, the net wage is the gross wage times one minus the tax rate, all divided by the price of consumption goods. With the status quo income tax, deadweight loss exists. Any addition to the price of consumption goods or an increase in the income tax extends the deadweight loss further. Either of these scenarios lowers the net wage, reducing the supply of labor offered. The supply of labor decreases because of the labor/leisure interchange. If someone gets paid very little, he or she may decide it is no longer worth his or her time to continue in that job. Thus, employment decreases. If the Pigouvian tax, which increases the price of consumption goods, replaces the income tax, Fullerton argues that the net wage is not affected.

This rejection of the double dividend hypothesis found in the "tax interaction" literature was met with surprise and skepticism among economists for a variety of reasons. There are multiple sources of ambiguity, differing definitions of what constitutes a 'double dividend', and confusion caused when comparing models with direct versus indirect tax programs, reliance on comparisons with an unreliable benchmark, and misinterpretation of notation in the literature.

Although the central question for the double dividend hypothesis and the tax interaction literature has been whether the welfare gains from environmental taxation in a second-best world are larger or smaller than in a first-best setting, the Tax Interaction literature takes this central question and frames it indirectly, by asking whether the second-best optimal environmental tax is higher or lower than the first-best Pigouvian rate. This question, too, is not answered directly, because the first-best Pigouvian rate is replaced by a definition of marginal social damages, the value of which changes with the tax level and tax program normalization. This becomes an unreliable and shifting benchmark (Jaeger 2011).

In retrospect, three factors contributed to misleading interpretations in the TI literature: an algebraic error, the use of an unreliable benchmark, and unrecognized compounding or double taxation. As a result, the conclusion that a large, previously unnoticed distortionary tax interaction effect existed can be seen as partly due to misinterpretations (Jaeger 2013). Despite these sources of confusion, it remains the case that a) the possibility of a double dividend depends on specifics specific to the demands and the economy in which an environmental tax is being considered, and b) that the efficiency gains with revenue recycling will be greater, potentially significantly greater, than when revenues are not collected and used to reduce pre-existing revenue-raising taxes. Various research studies using numerical models find evidence in support of the double dividend hypothesis (Jorgensen et al., 2013).

Environmental and revenue-raising taxes are complementary tools for achieving two different kinds of government goals: the provision of public goods with revenue-motivated taxes and the protection of environmental quality with corrective taxes. Indeed, the joint pursuit of these two goals through taxation can enable the government to justify doing more of each by making the optimal environmental tax higher than it would be otherwise, and by lowering the distortionary cost of financing the provision of public goods.

== Alternatives ==
The Pigouvian tax is a method commonly used by governments as it has relatively low transaction costs associated with implementation. Other methods such as command and control regulations or subsidies assume that the government has complete knowledge of the market, which is almost never the case, and can often lead to inefficiencies and market failure through rent-seeking behavior by individuals and firms.

=== Second-best optimal Pigouvian taxation (indirect taxation) ===
Sometimes when the optimal Pigouvian taxation is unfeasible in practice due to technical or political reasons to directly tax the externality, policymakers might opt to tax a product related to the externality indirectly, which will be the second-best optimal solution. For example, to mitigate the negative externalities from emissions produced by transportation policymakers might impose taxes on gasoline rather than emissions directly.

However, this makes everyone face different externalities due to the different number of purchases or the state of the vehicles. According to Knittel and Sandler's research, they found that the SBO taxes are an inefficient means of reducing vehicle emissions. It tends to overtax, resulting in the majority of vehicle owners paying excessive amounts.

=== No intervention (direct negotiation between parties) ===
Economist Ronald Coase argued that individuals can come to an agreement with an efficient result without the need for a third party when transaction costs are low. He says it is less expensive and less difficult for two neighbors to come to an agreement about a fence, the amount of noise, or the amount of smoke than it is for these two neighbors to approach a third party to solve the situation for them. Even when several parties are involved, outside interference could result in an inefficient outcome.

Yet, in dynamic settings Coasean bargaining ex post may lead to inefficient investments ex ante (the so-called hold-up problem). For this reason, some authors have argued that unconstrained Coasean bargaining may actually justify Pigouvian taxation.

=== Firm limits ===
Instead of taxing the negative externality producer, the government could regulate the production of that negative externality. Fullerton and Metcalf argue that restricting the amount of pollution that all firms in an industry can produce will indirectly reduce the output of all firms. This comprehensive supply reduction will automatically raise the consumption price of the good. These types of command-and-control restrictions stimulate cartel-like profits. Fullerton and Metcalf assert that production costs do not change, and assert that the companies can earn profits over and above what is earned before the regulations even with selling a lower quantity of goods. If the production cost of all firms increased simultaneously due to regulation, the firms may be able to increase the price uniformly. They do not consider the elasticity of products and the effect on the quantity of demand and the industry's final profits.

=== Cap and trade ===
Another alternative to applying Pigouvian taxation is for the government to place a limit on the total amount of the production of the output causing the negative externality and create a market for rights to generate that specific output. In the United States since the late 1970s, and in other developed nations since the 1980s, the concept of a market for "pollution rights" has emerged. Giving out the rights for free (or at less than market price) allows polluters to lose less profit or even gain profits (by selling their rights) relative to the unaltered market case.

Goulder, Perry, and Burtraw suggest that selling permits to firms is the best option, but recognize that many firms in the status quo are grandfathered, meaning they are given exemptions. The authors include an example of the U.S. regulations in coal-fired electrical power plants that require the reduction of 10 million tons of sulfur dioxide emissions. They estimate that more than half of the $907 million preexisting taxes could have been eliminated by auctioning off the permits rather than grandfathering them.

== Examples of Pigouvian taxes ==
=== Environmental tax ===
The environmental tax, including carbon taxes, fuel taxes, severance taxes, land value taxes (LVT) on the unimproved value of land, etc., is a classic example of the Pigouvian tax. It is a means to mitigate greenhouse gas emissions. Some said the environmental tax can deliver incentives to mitigate greenhouse gas emissions due to an increase in prices of fuel, carbon, or other types of taxes, and thus it can influence agents’ decisions economically and have effects on preserving the environment. However, others said that since these kinds of products are imposed taxes, their production prices will be higher, and thus the burden of increases in production costs can be shifted to consumers by increasing prices, which will increase pressure on low-income people and deteriorate income inequality.

According to the research of Manta, Sandler, Bădîrcea, Badareu, and Țăran, they found that although the Pigouvian theory does have effects on the reduction of greenhouse gas emissions, there are different results between developed countries and emerging countries. They revealed that once the Pigouvian tax in emerging countries is beyond the turning point, the effect of the Pigouvian tax on emissions will start decreasing.

=== Congestion pricing ===
From an economic aspect, traffic congestion is a negative externality, for drivers can affect other drivers' costs of travel, such as costs of time, miles, or gasoline.

Therefore, in 1920 A. C. Pigou published the first edition of The Economics of Welfare and tried to solve the congestion problem. Although the two-road model provided by Pigou was not intended to suggest the need for Pigouvian taxes to mitigate traffic congestion and thus dropped from subsequent editions, it is thought to be a starting point to analyze the congestion traffic. Since 1963, when William Vickrey published a paper and called for the pricing of traffic based on the welfare economic principle of Pigou, this method started to attend into political aspect in order to resolute the congestion problem in big cities.

Some studies have found that implementing Pigouvian taxes as a solution to congestion externalities in the form of entrance fees or tolls (i.e. congestion pricing) can maximize not only profits but also utility. However, others argued that it would increase the production costs of some industries, and that revenue would fall from the diminution of traffic. Heller, Johnen, and Schmitz argued that the traditional Pigouvian approach is not the optimal solution to the congestion problem. Rather, they believed the optimal solution is to charge drivers a variety of different prices which depend on the desired travel time, i.e. also depend on the number of drivers on the road.

=== Fat and sugar taxes ===
Map of countries with sugary drink taxes to discourage consumption (August 2022): Nation-wide sugary drink tax Regional sugary drink tax Sugary drink tax repealed No sugary drink tax

A fat tax is a tax that incorporates unhealthy foods into a society's diet that is made from ingredients considered harmful, such as sugar, starch, and trans fats. Governments implement health policy through education and price risks into food prices through taxes on public health products. Some say that consumers are price-sensitive, therefore, a fat tax can be imposed and used to enforce a healthy diet since the prices of harmful food are distorted by taxes, and consumers will be less willing to buy them.

=== Plastic taxes (e.g. on plastic bags) ===
From January 1, 2021, the plastic tax becomes its own resource in the EU budget 2021–2027. It is not actually a tax but a contribution from member states to the EU, based on the amount of non-recycled plastic packaging waste generated by each member state. The aim is to reduce plastic waste and stimulate member states to develop a circular economy together with the European Plastics Strategy. Each member state can design its own tax legislation to collect the plastic tax from producers, consumers, importers, etc.

=== Noise taxes ===
A noise tax is a tax which is put in place to regulate noise pollution, usually in order to not disturb nearby wildlife or communities. The most common cases of noise taxes are to do with the aviation industry and urban infrastructure such as highway construction.

Some examples of noise taxes which have been put in place have been in EU member states, such as France which has a noise tax on the aviation industry (Taxe sur les nuisances sonores aériennes, TNSA). The TNSA taxes both commercial and non-commercial aircraft which enter one of France's 10 busiest airports. The tax is calculated by a series of factors and coefficients, depending on the type of aircraft, weight of aeroplane (MTOW or Maximum Take-Off Weight), airport and timing of the flight. The tax is added up by the total number of flights per aircraft and reaches a higher level after a certain threshold.

Italy also has a noise tax in the aviation industry called the IRESA (Imposta Regionale sulle Emissioni Sonore degli Aeromobili Civili), which is a special-purpose tax, originally formed in 2001 on a national level, and later repurposed into a regional tax in 2013. Similarly to the French noise tax laws, IRESA tax is calculated by calculating a fee based on several attributes, most importantly the regional airport tax rate. A couple of aircraft are exempt from IRESA; Aircraft whose MTOW is below 4.5 metric tonnes, state-owned aircraft, search and rescue, agriculture and firefighting to name a few. The total revenue of IRESA in the Lazio Region was €55mln in 2014.

=== Other examples of Pigouvian taxes ===
- Meat taxes
- Sugar taxes
- Tobacco taxation
- Cannabis taxes, mainly due to passive smoking
- Alcohol taxes
- Sin taxes in general
- Luxury taxes
- Tobin tax against speculation in the financial markets
- Chewing gum tax; with the proceeds going towards street sweeping and other measures

== Criticisms ==
Most of the criticism of the Pigouvian tax relates to the determination of the tax and the implementation. Pigou and Friedrich Hayek point out that the assumption that the government can determine the marginal social cost of a negative externality and convert that amount into a monetary value is a weakness of the Pigouvian tax. William Baumol suggests that the measurement of social cost is almost impossible. Ronald Coase argues that all social costs are reciprocal in nature, so, once the tax is set, it must not be changed. Some point out that political factors can complicate the implementation of a Pigouvian tax, while others that the Pigouvian tax focuses solely on the market for the product that is responsible for the externality but does not take into account the interconnections with other markets, such as the labor market.

=== Measurement problem ===
Arthur Pigou said: "It must be confessed, however, that we seldom know enough to decide in what fields and to what extent the State, on account of [the gaps between private and public costs] could interfere with individual choice." In other words, the economist's blackboard "model" assumes knowledge we do not possess – it is a model with assumed "givens" which are in fact not given to anyone.

William Baumol as well as Polodoo (2008) have argued that it is extraordinarily difficult to measure the social costs of any externality, especially because many costs are psychological and individual. Even if a measurement of the psychological effect of some externality did exist, it would be impossible to collect that data for all individuals affected and then find the optimum output level. Since it is not possible to find the optimum output level, it is not possible to find the optimum Pigouvian tax level to achieve that optimum. In the end, Baumol argues that the best solution is to set a minimum standard of acceptability for negative externalities and create tax systems to achieve those minimum standards. Baumol points out that government committees have a tradition of agreeing on minimum standards, so the practicality of this solution is reasonable.

Peter Boettke argues:

The Pigouvian remedy was to bring marginal private costs (subjectively understood) into line with marginal social costs (objectively understood). The problem, James M. Buchanan pointed out, was that the analyst had to specify the conditions under which objectively measurable costs could be ascertained by economic and policy actors. In general, competitive equilibrium, there are also no deviations between marginal private costs and marginal social costs. In other words, Buchanan (like Ronald Coase) pointed out that Pigouvian tax remedies are either possible and redundant or impossible to set because the conditions presupposed for their establishment either eliminate their necessity or (if absent) preclude their enactment.

In other words, "Karen I. Vaughn has pointed out the dilemma involved in this situation. To calculate the appropriate corrective tax, the policymaker must know the equilibrium price; yet the situation demanding correction implies a disequilibrium situation."

=== Reciprocal cost problem ===
Ronald Coase argues that the tax placed on an industry creating a negative externality should not be changed after it is implemented. The crux of his argument is that all social costs are reciprocal in nature. Coase argues that a factory emitting smoke is not entirely responsible for the social harm of smoky air. If the factory were not there, no one would suffer from smoky air, and if the people were not there, no one would suffer from smoky air. Because of this reciprocity of harm, Coase argues that neither party bears sole responsibility for the social harm, so neither party should pay the full cost. The social harm gets worse, Coase argues, if only one offender pays for the social harm. If the smoke-emitting factory must pay dearly for all its smoke, it will reduce its quantity of production or buy the necessary technology to reduce its smoke rate. With the advent of clean air, neighbors may move into the area. This immediately increases the marginal social cost of smoke, which would require a tax increase on the factory. Essentially, each time the tax increases, the population increases and the marginal cost of the status quo increases again, so the factory is punished for making conditions good enough that people want to move there.

One complexity of this situation is the multiple local maxima or the interchangeable best-case scenarios. It all hinges on the numbers. If the cost of abating all smoke is more than the cost to move the neighbors out, the neighbors should move out and let the factory continue emitting smoke. On the other hand, if it costs less to abate the smoke than to move the neighbors, then the factory ought to pay the tax or buy the clean technology to provide clean air for the surrounding residents. Once the optimum solution is implemented, Coase argues that the tax should not change, regardless of changing circumstances. In this case, if a tax is imposed on the factory and some more neighbors move in, the factory tax should not increase.

=== Political problem ===
Political factors such as lobbying of government by polluters may also tend to reduce the level of the tax levied, which will tend to reduce the mitigating effect of the tax; lobbying of government by special interests who calculate the negative utility of the externality higher than others may also tend to increase the level of the tax levied, which will tend to result in a sub-optimal level of production.

Political factors can result in complementary problems when pollution opponents assert irrationally high levels of harm or operate from a hidden agenda of extirpating the polluting agent regardless of the prospects for regulating it to cause minimal harm; regulators are then driven to set absurdly high tax levels, possibly high enough to effectively prohibit operation.

Similarly, lobbyists whose agendas are entirely orthogonal to pollution reduction per se might intervene with regulators to drive tax rates higher or lower, thus preventing optimal operation of the tax. Likely instances of such include organizations intending to lower the polluter's market value as part of a pending plan to buy out its parent entity. Alternatively, there might be efforts to drive the polluter's market value higher prior to its sale. Familiar real-world examples of groups intervening for reason unrelated to pollution reduction include opponents of the polluter's (or the polluter's parent organization's) labor practices and groups with seemingly dogmatic opposition to anything connected to nuclear energy.

Earl A. Thompson and Ronald Batchelder cited one political problem with Pigouvian taxes being that if a firm can influence the tax rate or regulations put on it, the results will not be as certain as Pigou and Baumol suggested. Baumol responded to this, saying that almost all discussions on Pigouvian taxes include the assumption of pure competition.

This certainly does alter the scenario, but the literature had not ignored it; it had merely used a different set of assumptions.

Thomas A. Barthold argued in 1994 that actual policy decisions often come from budget requirements, not a concern for the environment. The taxes do not always parallel raw economic theory because social benefits and costs are hard to measure. He uses the United States' adoption of the 1987 Montreal Protocol as an example. President George H. W. Bush signed this protocol that allowed either a permit auction or a tax on ozone-depleting chemicals. Barthold attributes the decision to implement the tax to the pressure on the Ways and Means committee to come up with more consistent revenue.

The tax policy also did not accord with basic common sense economic principles. For one, it makes sense to impose a tax on the industry that creates the pollution problem, on the activity that emits the harmful chemicals. This particular activity happened to be the use of automobiles with leaky compressor systems, but because of the high administration cost of taxing that many people, the government decided to tax the producers of those chemicals, though they contributed nothing to the actual problems of chlorofluorocarbons in the atmosphere.

Another evidence of the alternative motivations for this policy is the fact that the base tax increases annually. It is unclear whether the harm from chlorofluorocarbons increases every year and in the same increment, or whether $1.37 per pound accurately reflects the marginal social cost of pollution. The conspicuous hike in the tax in 1992 that equalized the Energy Policy Act's budget further supports the idea of alternative motivations for this policy. Additionally, if the motivation for this tax was solely environmental improvement, then all firms, including those that export goods, would be taxed rather than receiving exemptions.

Barthold noted that politicians often prefer regulations with obvious benefits and hidden costs over those with hidden benefits and obvious costs. For example, politicians may prefer to hand out permits to firms rather than impose a tax on them, even though the tax is more economically efficient. Free permits create winners among grandfathered firms and losers among consumers who have to pay more for the same product. In contrast, taxation makes losers of factory producers and indirect winners of consumers.

== See also ==
- Carbon emission trading – Approach to limit climate change
- CC–PP game – Concept in resource allocation to explain economic decision-making
- Coase theorem – Theorem in economics
- Container-deposit legislation – Return of empty containers for refund
- Deposit-refund system – Surcharge refunded when part of a product is returned
- Environmental tax – Compulsory fee intended to discourage environmentally harmful acts
- Excise – Goods tax levied at the moment of manufacture rather than sale
- Geolibertarianism – Political and economic ideology integrating libertarianism with Georgism
- Georgism – Economic philosophy centered on common ownership of land
- Pigou Club, also known as "UDAY" parties in Asia
- Polluter pays principle – Principle in environmental law
- Priority Sector Lending Certificates
- Sin tax – Excise or sales tax specifically levied on goods deemed harmful to society
- Alcohol tax – Excise on alcoholic beverages
- Social cost – Concept in neoclassical economics
- Steering tax – Tax that aims to change behavior
- Sugary drink tax – Tax or surcharge on soft drinks with high sugar content
- Tax choice – Participatory tax allocation process
