= Cross subsidization =

Higher prices to fund lower prices elsewhere

Cross subsidization is the practice of charging higher prices to one type of consumers to artificially lower prices for another group. State trading enterprises with monopoly control over marketing agricultural exports are sometimes alleged to cross subsidize, but lack of transparency in their operations makes it difficult, if not impossible, to determine if that is the case.

In many countries, telecommunications (including broadband accesses), postal services, electricity tariffs, and collective traffic among others are cross-subsidized. In some cases, there is a universal price ceiling for the services, leading to cross subsidies benefiting the areas for which the costs of provision are high.

== Criticism ==
According to Osmo Soininvaara, political economics author and statistician and Finnish parliamentarian, cross-subsidy leads to welfare losses for passengers in urban areas, arguing that even if there are reasons for subsidizing public transport in sparsely populated areas, it is better to provide subsidy from general taxation rather than have passengers in more densely populated areas provide subsidy by directing profits from reinvestment in these services. This results in higher fares, lower staff wages, lower frequencies and older vehicles on popular services, reduce the attractiveness of services and spreading financial risks of unprofitable services to profitable services and can result in cuts to profitable services to cover expected and unexpected losses. Cross-subsidy puts the financial burden for unprofitable services on passengers who often have the least ability to pay. He also notes that in sparsely populated areas, cars are often more ecologically friendly than buses.

Some economists argue that cross subsidization in state owned enterprises increases the likelihood of anticompetitive practices such as predatory pricing. They argue that regulators, such as U.S. postal regulators, should monitor a state monopoly's cost allocation to ensure that revenue generated in the monopolized market is not used to lessen competition in competitive markets.

== See also ==
- Feebate
- Subsidy
