= Steering tax =

Tax that aims to change behavior

A steering tax or ecological incentive tax is a tax which aims to change the behaviour of the tax payer, as defined by lawmakers, and not particularly to increase tax revenue. The term is not sharply definable because many tax related laws influence buyer behaviour which is not always a wanted effect (compensation reaction). The Pigovian tax is a special case of a steering tax to avoid negative externality. An ecological tax reform is often understood to refer to the introduction of a steering tax on energy use, according to the polluter pays principle.

In other languages incentive taxes (or fees) are known as "de:Lenkungsabgabe" or "Lenkungs-Steuer" (Switzerland). Some of the eco-taxes ("Ökosteuer") in Germany and Austria are also steering taxes, in the sense of the originally intended Eco-social market economy.

The vehicle excise duty in Germany is an example of a steering tax. It is formulated in such a way that there is an incentive to invest in a new car which is as low polluting as possible. Cars with larger pollutant emissions pay a high tax compared to less polluting cars. Electric cars are tax free. In Germany and Switzerland it is legally clarified that the tax revenues should be used to promulgate, or "steer", the targeted behaviour change. The increase of earnings may be as long secondary aim as the rule has an objective earning relevance. This means that the tax may be as long be valid as a tax earning can be expected to take place and therefore the steering effect is justified.

If the aim of steering the payer's behaviour is successful, this means that the aim to increase tax revenues will be unsuccessful. The yield of tax revenue is reduced if the tax payers behave in the targeted way. For example, the consumption of cigarettes was quickly significantly reduced in Germany in 2004 by the increase of the tobacco tax.

== Redistribution of steering taxes to consumers and economy ==
There are also steering taxes like the de:Swiss VOC-fee (Incentive Tax on Volatile Organic Compounds), which will be completely distributed amongst the population.

In this case there is no aim to increase tax revenues at all. The ideal goal of such a refund is the creation of positive incentives: People will be rewarded when they behave in the wanted way. If, for example they reduce the emission of greenhouse gases or environmentally dangerous pollutants and reduce their ecological footprint, they get back an ecological bonus (German: Ökobonus), because with the consumption of non-taxed environmentally friendly products, they pay less eco-taxes than the Green-Cheque is per capita: The amount of the eco-bonus is independent from the energy consumption of the individual recipients.

In the words of a publication of the European Environment Agency: “A Swiss study (INFRAS/ECOPLAN, 1998), which investigated the economic and social impacts of different energy tax schemes, showed that redistributing revenues in the form of a per capita bonus is the most progressive option for an environmental tax reform and creates the most beneficial social effects, although it leads to slightly negative effects on economic development.”

The repayment of steering taxes is often named fiscal subsidy. If this is accurate depends if one believes a steering tax is used solely as a direct transfer of public funds to private persons, or if they are seen as a relinquishment of state earnings to realize fiscal neutrality for this market-based environmental policy instrument. The official wording of the German federal government for such a revenue abstinence is "subsidy related matters of fact".

“The recycling [or redistribution of steering tax-] revenues is especially important for the acceptability, and equity of the tax reforms.” But a difficulty for the political system is, that opinion polls have shown that the redistribution aspect of eco-taxes “is very poorly understood by a large majority of the population.“

== See also ==
- Carbon fee and dividend
- Environmental tax
  - Carbon tax
- Pigouvian tax
- Tax on childlessness
