= Public bad =

Concept in economics

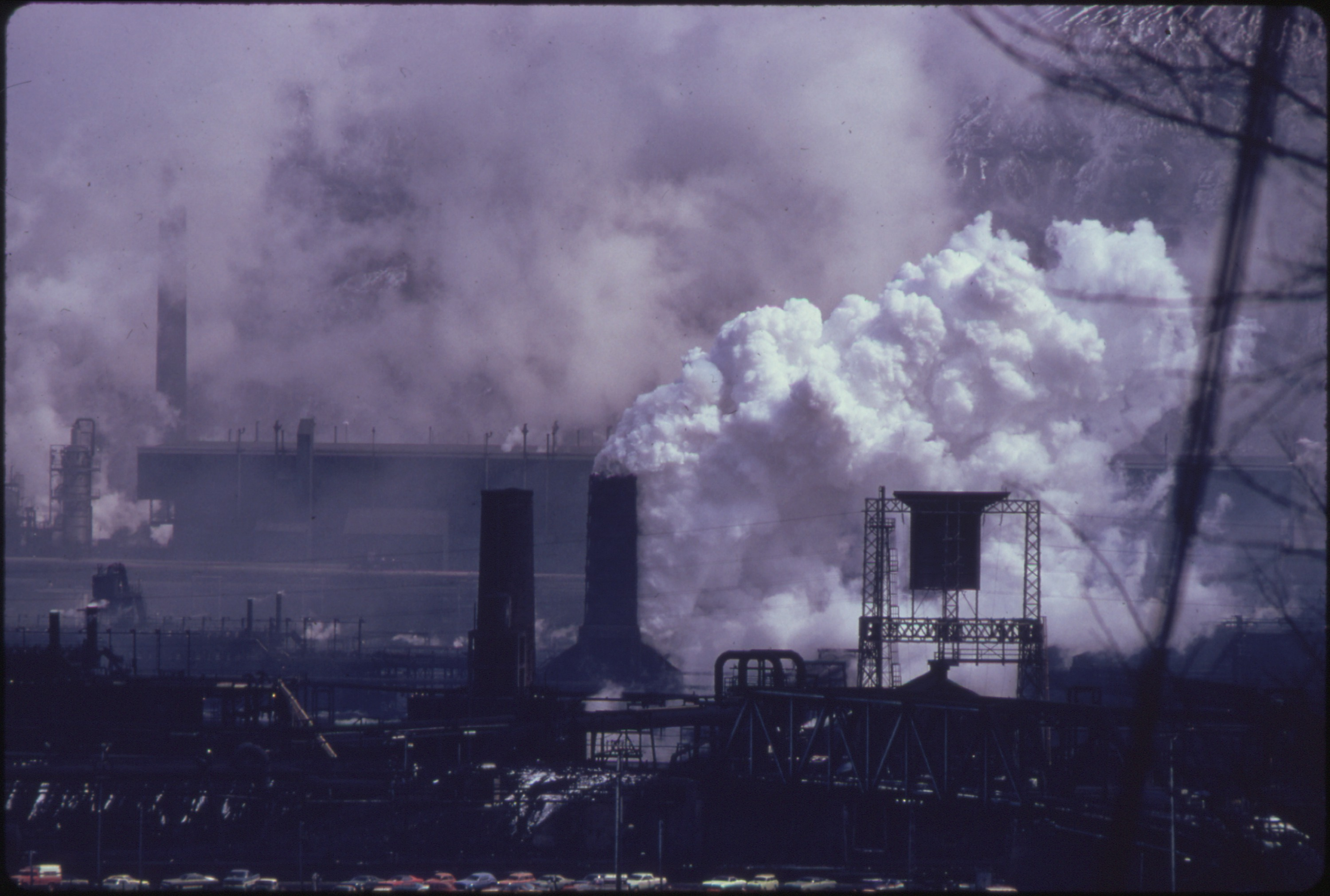
Air pollution is an example of a public bad.

A public bad, in economics, is the symmetrical opposite of a public good. Air pollution is the most obvious example since it is non-excludable and non-rival, and negatively affects welfare.

Whereas public goods are typically under-provided by decentralized decision making (the market), public bad will generally be over-provided, since the parties generating the public bad do not account for the negative effects (or externality) imposed on others. One possibility to mitigate the existence of public bad is the intervention of a third party, typically the state.

In green economics, it is a good that produces socially undesirable results (or an externality in standard economics). Most green economists advise measuring such impacts back to the present from the seventh generation. Thus in the golf course example, both the recreation and the negative impacts from deforestation, associated habitat and biodiversity loss, and pesticide toxicity would be estimated across those generations and some amortization applied to determine whether the golf course was a public benefit or a public bad from the point of view of that seventh generation.

Green economists argue that the costs of public bads are hidden as externalities from the businesses that cause them — meaning the market is not working correctly. The legal challenge is to create a system that takes into account these costs. The United States Environmental Protection Agency is an example of an attempt to make sure the costs of public bads are taken into account, although some groups on the right and left have criticized the value of its efforts.

== Examples of public bads ==
- pollution
- Antibiotic resistance (from overuse)
- Misinformation (if widely spread)
- crime (especially if the crime affects everybody)
- Climate change
- Pandemic and epidemic
- recession
- hyperinflation
- natural disaster
- Deforestation, excess water use and pesticide use might well be seen as public bads, externalizing harms on future and current generations.
- wartime
- famine

== See also ==
- Externality
- Social cost
