= Market governance mechanism =

Rules designed to change the behaviour of economic actors

Market governance mechanisms (MGMs) are formal, or informal rules, that have been consciously designed to change the behaviour of various economic actors. This includes actors such as individuals, businesses, organisations and governments - who in turn encourage sustainable development.

Market governance is characterized by high-powered incentives and adaptability (i.e. flexibility). An example of an alliance structured with a market governance mechanism is a legal agreement between two organizations to distribute, license or export a particular product. The rules governing the exchange are dictated by contract law where each party is highly incentivized to act in their best interest, with the nature of the relationship being adaptable, suggesting that the terms of the contract can be changed or renegotiated at minimal costs.

Well known MGMs include fair trade certification, the European Union Emission Trading System and Payment for Ecosystem Services (PES).

MGMs, meanwhile, are not to be confused with market-based instruments. MGMs, as a group, includes command and control regulations as well as regulatory economics. As such, MGM is a broader classification.

The success and failure of market governance mechanisms is highly political, and is therefore likely to require more than just formal changes to rules and regulations. Sustained and inclusive progress requires transformative change reaching beyond legal frameworks into cultural domains, altering peoples’ perceptions of what is ‘the norm’ and establishing new moral frameworks to guide market activities.

Market governance does not require such significant idiosyncratic investments from the buyers and sellers. Without investing sufficient resources, intent, and time, market governance is just a simple buyer-to-seller relationship that is relatively standardized and straightforward (Ring and Van de Ven, 1994; Larsson et al., 1998).

TCE (transaction cost economics) demonstrates that the governance between independent firms can be crafted by the degree of asset specificity (Ouchi, 1980; Williamson, 1985; Lai, 1990; Stump and Heide, 1996), that is, transactions of the high asset-specificity form should be governed by the hierarchy governance mechanism; transactions of the low asset-specificity type should be governed by the market governance mechanism.

Buyer-to-supplier governance alone is not sufficient to drive positive change of supplier’s social and ethical conduct. If only simply deploying code monitoring, buyers from AEs may defend their brands or reputation against NGO or customer criticism, but cannot actively pursue meaningful improvement of supplier’s compliance. The overall reliance on buyer-to-supplier governance may create a system in which a supplier’s main objective is to pass the audit, rather than address the substantive issues that are the focus of the audit. In market governance, opportunism in interorganizational relationships may be controlled through threats (Gundlach et al., 1995). Even though, as a result, buyers from AEs must be aware that an emphasis on market governance (i.e. threatening, monitoring, or inspecting) may actually be more costly in the long run (Roth et al., 2008).

The Trust and Tracing game is an operationalization of the theory on market governance in a new institutional perspective. It enables research into the interaction between the four levels of analysis of Williamson. It places participants in a serialized asynchronous Prisoners Dilemma-like situation. This situation is called the Trader’s Predicament. Netchains are another form of market governance.

If we treat organizational conventions as institutions and various types of market governance mechanism (trust and reputations, merchants' norms, third-party contract enforcement, "digital enforcement" and so on) as institutions arising in the commodity exchange domains, there may be complementary relationships between a certain pair of them.

== History ==
The term "market governance mechanism" was used by Baysinger and Butler in 1985 in their paper on the role of corporate law in the theory of the firm. Then, Amashi et al., used the term to discuss the role of corporate social responsibility in correcting market failures. And more recently, Shaping Sustainable Markets, a research initiative from the Sustainable Markets Group at the International Institute of Environment and Development, uses the term widely and have created a typology to frame its work on the sustainable development impact and effectiveness of MGMs.

== Classification ==
Market governance mechanisms can be organised into the following groups:

=== Economic ===
Use price incentives to change behaviour.

=== Regulatory (Hard) ===
Use legal requirements to enforce or ban certain behaviours.

=== Cooperative (Soft) ===
Use agreements to encourage partners (other organisations, governments or individuals) to voluntarily change their behaviour.

=== Informational ===
Raise awareness of sustainable development (including poverty or environmental issues, for example) to change consumers’ and investors’ behaviour.
