= Command and control regulation =

Type of rule-making; contrasted with direct investments and incentives in climate policy

Command and Control (CAC) regulation finds common usage in academic literature and beyond. The relationship between CAC and environmental policy is considered in this article, an area that demonstrates the application of this type of regulation. However, CAC is not limited to the environmental sector and encompasses a variety of different fields.

== Definition ==
Command and Control (CAC) Regulation can be defined as “the direct regulation of an industry or activity by legislation that states what is permitted and what is illegal”. This approach differs from other regulatory techniques, e.g. the use of economic incentives, which frequently includes the use of taxes and subsidies as incentives for compliance. The ‘command’ is the presentation of quality standards/targets by a government authority that must be complied with. The ‘control’ part signifies the negative sanctions that may result from non-compliance e.g. prosecution.

CAC encompasses a variety of methods. Influencing behaviour through: laws, incentives, threats, contracts and agreements. In CAC, there is a perception of a problem and the solution for its control is developed and subsequently implemented.

In the case of environmental policy and regulation, the CAC approach strongly relies on the use of standards to ensure the improvements in the quality of the environment. The CAC approach uses three main types of standards. These are ambient standards, emission standards, and technology standards. Although these standards can be used individually, it is also possible to use the standards in combination. In fact, in most pollution control programs, it is the case where there is a combination of standards being implemented.

Although environmental policy has a long history, a proliferation of policy making in this area occurred in the 1970s and continued to today. The CAC approach dominated policy in industrial nations during this decade because the general focus was on that of remedial policies rather than more comprehensive prevention techniques. Whilst many view CAC negatively, direct regulatory control is still used in many countries' environmental policy.

== Enforcement and compliance ==
To deliver its objectives, direct regulation must ensure the highest level of compliance possible. This can be achieved through appropriate implementation and enforcement. Non-compliance to CAC regulation presents a serious challenge to its effectiveness The manner in which CAC is enforced differs between countries. For example, in the US, some regulators who are tasked with implementing CAC techniques are given rule-making powers. Whereas in the UK, regulatory standards are more commonly set by departments of government. This is achieved through both primary and secondary legislation which is subsequently exacted by regulatory bureaucracies. Regulation differs within countries as well, in the UK the current regulatory sanctioning system possesses variations between powers and practices among regulators. Enforcement of CAC often involves the use of uniform sanctions, this can result in small businesses feeling the burdens of regulation more severely than companies of a larger size.

== Strengths and weaknesses of approach ==
A CAC approach in policy is used for several reasons. It has been proposed that by imposing fixed standards with the force of law behind them, CAC can respond more quickly to activities which do not abide by the set standards. It also has benefits politically as the regulator (often the government) is seen to be acting swiftly and decisively.

It is far from a problem free form of regulation; the 1980s in particular saw CAC subject to widespread criticism. A good number of the critics tend to favour market-based strategies and are often dubious of the merits of governmental regulatory approaches.

Some issues highlighted include:

- Regulatory capture: The concern here is that the relationship between regulators and the regulated may lead to the interests of the public being neglected. In this situation it is possible for the relationship to become too close, leading to capture. This may result in the regulator protecting the interests of the regulated.
- Legalism: Command and control has been accused of stifling competition and enterprise. It has been posited that this is an inevitable consequence of the inflexible and complicated rules that can be created by the approach. Over-regulation can result, which in turn can lead to ‘over-inclusive’ regulation.
- Standard-setting: Selecting the appropriate standards when implementing a CAC regime is crucial if the regulation is to avoid causing detriment to those that it regulates. This is a challenging obstacle to overcome as the amount of information required can be severe.
- Enforcement: This constitutes a very significant dilemma for a CAC regulatory approach. One of the key issues is the expense of enforcement, especially when a complex system of rules has been developed. There are also problems of scope.

Critics of CAC often point to incentive-based regulation as an alternative with terms used such as smart regulation, management-based regulation, responsive regulation and meta-regulation. Possible benefits of this approach may include cheaper administration costs and a reduction in the risk of regulatory capture. However the view that incentive-based regulation is radically different from CAC has been scrutinised. The advantages can be exaggerated, a complex system of rules is often necessary to allow an effective system, this can cause many incentive-based schemes to appear to replicate some of the characteristics of CAC. Inspection and enforcement may also be essential to prevent evasion of liability, again resembling CAC and possibly removing the posited benefits in terms of cost. While practices may be changed at a superficial level through the use of CAC, it may not be able to achieve the changes of behaviour necessary for more sustainable environmental practices. There are some commentators on the topic who prefer to use ‘direct regulatory instrument’ instead of ‘command and control’ instrument because of the negative connotations surrounding the term.

== Efficiency ==
Much of the literature on regulatory instruments considers efficiency in terms of monetary costs. CAC has been labelled by many critics as ‘inefficient’ as a system that spends resources but generates little revenue. The cost of compliance is perceived to be high, which can result in costs that are higher than the sanctions for non-compliance. A summary of 10 studies demonstrated significant differences in cost between CAC and least cost alternatives. Empirical data suggests that CAC regulations, especially government subsidies in agriculture, often fuel environmental damage, deforestation and overfishing in particular.

Some have moved to defend certain aspects of a CAC approach, arguing against the commonly held belief that these regimes are inherently inefficient. Economics incentives are frequently referred to as a considerably more efficient approach to regulation. The most commonly used incentives in this method relate to tax. The administrative costs of tax collection can be understated. Advocates of incentives have been accused of making simplifying assumptions and not fully taking into account the costs of administrating tax systems. In some circumstances, CAC regulation can end up being a less costly option. Whilst economic instruments may act to reduce compliance costs, in certain cases their total costs may actually be higher, This may stem from the high level of monitoring that is required to make an incentivised method viable and successful.

== Environmental regulation ==
=== Application ===
The use of Command and Control in regulation involves the government or similar body to “command” the reduction of pollution (e.g. setting emissions levels) levels and to “control” the manner in which it is achieved (e.g. by installing pollution-control technologies). It has been argued that CAC has the potential to be effective under certain conditions. Often its effectiveness can be determined by whether the problem has a diffuse or a point source. A CAC approach is relatively compatible with point source and regulation of these can often achieve success. On the other hand, CAC struggles to appropriately tackle issues that have a diffuse, non-point source. Evans draws on the following example: “it is relatively easy to regulate the emissions from 10 large coal burning power stations in a single country, but far less easy to monitor the emissions caused by millions of motorists or the effluent discharges from tens of thousands of farms across the world.”

In Environmental Policy, CAC is characterised by 3 different types of standards, the use of the standards is determined by various factors, including the nature of the environmental problem and the administrative capacities of the governing body:

- Environmental Standards. These are centrally driven standards. A legally enforceable numerical limit is often used to determine the 'standard', but the term can be used more broadly, describing more general rules about acceptability.
- Target Standards. The condition of the environment into which the pollutant enters is central to these standards. It can be subdivided into ambient and receptor standards. Ambient standards set the targets that apply to the regulators and policy makers. Whereas Receptor standards apply to the regulated and state that a specified maximum level is not to be exceeded.
- Performance Standards. These determine what releases of a pollutant into the environment are acceptable.

It has been suggested that if compliance reaches appropriate levels, there may be a good degree of certainty of environmental results. CAC regulation has the potential to lead to a more rapid resolution of certain environmental policy objectives. It may also provide clarity to those that are subject to the regulation. There may be a clearer understanding of what is required and how to meet those requirements. It has been argued that the use of the CAC approach to solve environmental problems can result in unexpected consequences if the application is conducted uncritically. Much of environmental policy to date has been associated with the term Disjointed Incrementalism. This term was coined by Lindblom and describes the small and often unplanned changes that have occurred in the field of environmental regulation. These changes in regulation often address small-scale problems with laws tuned towards the particular area of concern. This approach is criticised on the grounds that it does not take into account the wider causes of environmental issues.

=== International environmental agreements ===
==== Montreal Protocol ====
The 1987 Montreal Protocol is commonly cited as a CAC success story at the international level. The aim of the agreement was to limit the release of Chlorofluorocarbons into the atmosphere and subsequently halt the depletion of Ozone (O3) in the stratosphere.

There were a number of factors that contributed to Montreal’s success, these included:

- The problem and solution were both clearly defined and supported by industry (albeit not initially)
- The Ozone hole was easily measurable
- There was an effective scientific lobbying alliance that played a key role in convincing the US Government and the commercial sector (in particular DuPont, then one of the largest manufacturers of CFCs)

Defining this agreement as a CAC approach is slightly problematic as the agreement does not directly instruct states how to meet their targets. However, the aim of the Montreal Protocol has been to eliminate the source of CFC emissions, as a result the only really feasible way for a state to achieve this would be through a ban on substances related to Ozone depletion. Montreal is considered by some to be a 'special case' of a successful CAC approach.

==== Climate change ====
The traditional model of command and control typically involved areas of environmental concern being dealt with by national governments. In recent decades, transboundary environmental problems have risen in prominence. This shift has exposed many of the limitations of a command and control approach when it is applied to a larger and more complex arena. Climate change is often used to exemplify the perceived failings of this regulatory approach. Climate change is good example of a concern that is complex, full of uncertainties and difficult for many people to understand. This may help explain the apparent incompatibility of climate change and a CAC approach. Mitigating climate change requires action of a much more proactive nature than traditional CAC models are able to deliver. One reason for the lack of compatibility with many international environmental agreements is the manner in which the international community is organised. International law cannot be implemented in the same way as law at national level. The CAC approach relies heavily on prohibiting certain activities and then enforcing the prohibition through sanctions, which makes scaling it up to the international level problematic. Without a strong international enforcement body it is unlikely that CAC will be an effective tool for dealing with most transboundary environmental issues, climate change included.

=== Future of command and control regulation in environmental policy ===
The international nature of many contemporary environmental issues makes CAC regulatory approaches difficult. Since the 1970s enthusiasm for the implementation of economic incentives for regulation has been on the increase. This is due, in part, to the disenchantment with command and control. The shift away from CAC does not seem to be slowing, the increased participation of a variety of actors may be the answer. The role of environmental NGOs in policy making has changed drastically in recent decades. Their numbers and the influence they exert over national governments and negotiations at international level has risen. The involvement of NGOs has assisted the development of international policy in a number of ways. A great deal of environmental policy has been influenced by research collected by these organisations. They also act as whistleblowers, updating the regulators of progress and compliance. A blend of different approaches, involving a range of actors and regulatory types may be the best answer. However, it is likely that many governments will persist with CAC because of the political benefits and the fact that it is not always as inflexible and inefficient as many economists would suggest.
