= List of supporters of Pigouvian taxes =

The Pigou Club is described by its creator, economist Gregory Mankiw, as a “group of economists and pundits with the good sense to have publicly advocated higher Pigouvian taxes" A Pigouvian tax is a tax levied to correct the negative externalities (negative side-effects) of a market activity. These ideas are also known as an ecotaxes or green tax shifts.

== People ==
Members	Date of induction	Description
Daron Acemoglu	Sept 2011	Economist
Frank Ackerman	November 29, 2015	Economist
Jonathan H. Adler	May 30, 2012	Law professor
Joseph Aldy	May 3, 2016	Policy professor
Anne Applebaum	February 6, 2007	Pundit
Kenneth Arrow	March 28, 2014	Economist
Joseph Avellone	March 20, 2014	Politician
Katherine Baicker	July 19, 2012	Economist
Dean Baker	July 19, 2012	Economist
William Baldwin	June 24, 2006	Journalist
Jim Barrett	April 1, 2000	Economist
Bruce Bartlett	May 15, 2017	Historian of Economics
Yoram Bauman	April 1998	Economist
Gary Becker	June 17, 2006	Economist
Antonio Bento	March 5, 2013	Economist
Don Berwick	March 20, 2014	Administrator
Jack Black	August 24, 2016	Actor
Alan Blinder	January 31, 2011	Economist
Michael Bloomberg	November 2, 2007	Politician
Erik Brynjolfsson	February 8, 1991	Economist
Jay Buckey	January 16, 2008	Pundit
Willem Buiter	June 12, 2008	Economist
Steve Chapman	July 4, 2013	Pundit
Judith Chevalier	December 2007	Economist
Noam Chomsky	May 21, 2013	Philosopher
Steven Chu	Dec 16, 2008	Scientist
John H. Cochrane	August 7, 2013	Economist
Richard N. Cooper	October 2008	Economist
Bob Corker	unknown	Politician
Tyler Cowen	September 8, 2009	Economist
Kevin Cramer	unknown	Political advisor
Clive Crook	June 24, 2006	Pundit
Herman Daly	August 14, 2007	Economist
Laura D'Andrea Tyson	unknown	Economist
Leonardo DiCaprio	August 21, 2014	Actor
Christopher Dodd	April 25, 2007	Politician
Ed Dolan	July 28, 2010	Economist
Gregg Easterbrook	June 17, 2006	Pundit
Christopher Farrell	June 24, 2006	Composer
Peter Shaffer	March 18, 2002	Playwright
Robert H. Frank	June 17, 2006	Economist
Bill Frenzel	February 16, 2007	Politician
Thomas Friedman	June 17, 2006	Pundit
David Frum	November 9, 2006	Pundit
Jason Furman	February 2, 2007	Economist
William Gale	unknown	Economist
Richard H Gammon	October 2016	Scientist
Bill Gates	September 2, 2010	Business magnate
Ted Gayer	June 27, 2006	Economist
Edward Glaeser	May 21, 2007	Economist
Al Gore	June 24, 2006	Politician
Lindsey Graham	March 1, 2010	Politician
Corbett Grainger	February 26, 2016	Economist
Alan Greenspan	October 2, 2006	Economist
Michael Greenstone	October 12, 2010	Economist
Steven C. Hackett	August 22, 2008	Economist
Ted Halstead	July 26, 2016	Author / Nonprofit CEO
James Hansen	unknown	Scientist
Tim Harford	December 8, 2006	Economist
Kevin Hassett	January 29, 2007	Economist
Katharine Hayhoe	June 5, 2015	Scientist
Shi-Ling Hsu	unknown	Economist/Law professor
Bob Inglis	December 27, 2008	Politician
Henry Jacoby	June 28, 2013	Economist
Gary Johnson	August 1, 2016	Politician
Michael B. Jordan	November 28, 2017	Actor
Dale Jorgenson	June 12, 2012	Economist
Juliette Kayyem	March 20, 2014	Law professor, homeland security expert
Charles Komanoff	March 6, 1989	Economist
Joe Klein	June 17, 2006	Pundit
Morton Kondracke	June 23, 2007	Pundit
Charles Krauthammer	January 26, 2007	Pundit
Paul Krugman	June 24, 2006	Economist
Anthony Lake	October 30, 2006	Politician
Arthur Laffer	December 27, 2008	Economist
John Larson	August 9, 2007	Politician
Judith Layzer	July 3, 2012	Political scientist
David Leonhardt	February 21, 2007	Pundit
Arik Levinson	unknown	Economist
Steven Levitt	June 18, 2006	Economist
Brink Lindsey	December 5, 2006	Attorney
Bob Litterman	unknown	Economist
Ray Magliozzi	January 15, 2007	Pundit
N. Gregory Mankiw	June 17, 2006	Economist
Donald B. Marron Jr.	November 2014	Economist
Megan McArdle	June 24, 2006	Journalist
Jim McDermott	2007	Politician
Daniel McFadden	January 22, 2007	Economist
Gilbert Metcalf	June 30, 2015	Economist
Warren Meyer	March 25, 2016	Engineer
Mike Moffatt	September 16, 2006	Economist
William Moomaw	July 3, 2012	Scientist
Adele C. Morris	unknown	Economist
Alan Mulally	August 9, 2007	Ford CEO
Chris Murphy	unknown	Politician
Elon Musk	February 3, 2015	Business magnate
Ralph Nader	December 3, 2008	Politician
Gavin Newsom	December 9, 2007	Politician
William Nordhaus	June 17, 2006	Economist
Grover Norquist	February 16, 2006	Founder, Americans for Tax Reform
Steven Novella	June 17, 2016	Physician, skeptic
Bill Nye	October 21, 2014	Scientist
Leon Panetta	October 18, 2006	Politician
Peter Passell	April 1, 1992	Economist
Robert Pindyck	2013	Economist
Phil Plait	July 21, 2016	Scientist
Brad Plumer	unknown	Pundit
Eduardo Porter	September 11, 2012	Journalist
Paul Portney	May 18, 2007	Economist
Richard Posner	November 4, 2006	Jurist
Jonathan Rauch	June 17, 2006	Journalist
Robert Reich	unknown	Economist
Richard Revesz	September 15, 2015	Law professor
Kenneth Rogoff	September 16, 2006	Economist
Nouriel Roubini	November 9, 2006	Economist
Steven Running	Feb 27, 2006	Scientist
Jeffrey Sachs	April 9, 2008	Economist
Robert J. Samuelson	January 17, 2007	Journalist
Andrew Samwick	June 24, 2006	Economist
Bernie Sanders	Feb 16, 2013	Politician
Isabel Sawhill	February 16, 2007	Economist
Brian Schatz	November 19, 2014	Politician
George Shultz	October 30, 2006	Economist
Robert J. Shapiro	February 20, 2007	Economist
Eliot Spitzer	July 5, 2012	Politician
Pete Stark	2007	Politician
Irwin Stelzer	unknown	Economist
Charles Stenholm	February 16, 2007	Politician
Joseph Stiglitz	unknown	Economist
Andrew Sullivan	June 24, 2006	Pundit
Lawrence Summers	October 31, 2006	Economist
Alex Tabarrok	June 16, 2010	Economist
Jerry Taylor	March 23, 2015	Economist
Richard Thaler	April 1, 2012	Economist
John Tierney	June 17, 2006	Pundit
Rex Tillerson	February 9, 2009	Exxon-Mobil CEO
Ben van Beurden	October 5, 2015	Royal Dutch Shell CEO
Hal Varian	October 1, 2006	Economist
Paul Volcker	February 14, 2007	Economist
Gernot Wagner	September 7, 2011	Economist
Margaret A. Walls	unknown	Economist
Charles Wheelan	unknown	Economist
Sheldon Whitehouse	November 19, 2014	Politician
Neil Young	November 24, 2015	Musician

== Organizations ==
The Economist has expressed support for Pigouvian policies as has The Washington Post Editorial Board, NPR's "Planet Money" and The New York Times.
