= Ted Halstead =

American think tank executive (1968–2020)

- Born: July 25, 1968; Chicago, Illinois, U.S.
- Died: September 2, 2020 (aged 52); Es Capdellà, Spain
- Education: Dartmouth College; Harvard University
- Occupations: Author, public speaker, think tank founder

Ted Halstead (July 25, 1968 – September 2, 2020) was an American author, policy entrepreneur, and public speaker who founded four non-profit think tanks and advocacy organizations: the Climate Leadership Council, Americans for Carbon Dividends, New America, and Redefining Progress. His areas of expertise included climate policy, economic policy, environmental policy, healthcare, and political reform.

Halstead published numerous articles and two books including The Radical Center: The Future of American Politics (co-authored with Michael Lind). His articles have appeared in The New York Times, The Wall Street Journal, the Financial Times, Fortune, The Washington Post, The Atlantic, National Review, and the Harvard Business Review, among other publications.

He was selected as a Young Global Leader by the World Economic Forum in Cologny in Geneva, Switzerland.

== Education ==
Halstead earned a bachelor's degree in 1990 from Dartmouth College in Hanover, New Hampshire where he graduated magna cum laude, Phi Beta Kappa with a degree in philosophy. He received his MPA in 1998 from Harvard's Kennedy School of Government, where he was a Montgomery Fellow.

== Climate Leadership Council ==
Halstead was the founder, chairman, and CEO of the Climate Leadership Council, which promotes carbon dividends as a cost-effective, politically viable, and equitable way to reduce carbon pollution. The CLC was soft-launched on May 19, 2016, with the publication of Halstead's white paper, "Unlocking the Climate Puzzle". The report summarizes the economic, geopolitical, and psychological reasons that climate progress is deadlocked. It suggests that a carbon dividends plan could overcome each of these barriers.

The Climate Leadership Council was officially launched on February 8, 2017, with the publication of "The Conservative Case for Carbon Dividends", co-authored by James A. Baker III, Martin Feldstein, Halstead, Gregory Mankiw, Henry M. Paulson Jr., George P. Shultz, Thomas Stephenson, and Rob Walton. This report argues that a new climate strategy based on carbon dividends can strengthen America's economy, reduce regulation, help working-class Americans, shrink government, and promote national security. A profile in Bloomberg suggested the release of this report "may be the biggest day for climate policy since the Paris Agreement was signed in 2015."

Since then the Climate Leadership Council has recruited a number of "Founding Members" which include:

- Corporate Founding Members: AECOM, Allianz, AT&T, Ford, GM, Johnson & Johnson, IBM, MetLife, Microsoft, Procter & Gamble, PepsiCo, Santander, Schneider Electric, Unilever
- Energy Founding Members: BHP, BP, Calpine, ConocoPhillips, Exelon, First Solar, Shell, Total, and Vistra Energy
- NGO Founding Members: Conservation International, World Resources Institute, and World Wildlife Fund
- Individual Founding Members: Ben Bernanke, Steven Chu, Ray Dalio, Martin Feldstein, Ted Halstead, Stephen Hawking, N. Gregory Mankiw, Paul Polman, Klaus Schwab, Thomas Stephenson, Lawrence Summers, Ratan Tata, Rob Walton, Christine Todd Whitman, and Janet Yellen

The Climate Leadership Council's Baker-Shultz Carbon Dividends Plan is based on four pillars: (1) a gradually rising carbon fee, (2) carbon dividends for all Americans, (3) regulatory simplification, and (4) border carbon adjustment.

In 2019, the Climate Leadership Council helped organize a large public statement: The Economists Statement on Carbon Dividends, first published in The Wall Street Journal and signed by over 3,500 U.S. economists, including all four living former Chairs of the Federal Reserve (Janet Yellen, Ben Bernanke, Alan Greenspan, and Paul Volcker), 27 Nobel Laureate economists, and 15 former chairs of the President's Council of Economic Advisors.

== Americans for Carbon Dividends ==
Halstead was founding CEO of Americans For Carbon Dividends, a 501(c)(4) lobbying organization that promoted a national carbon dividends. The national co-chairs of Americans for Carbon Dividends are former Republican Senate majority leader Trent Lott and former Democratic Senator John Breaux. Americans for Carbon Dividends was publicly launched in June 2018 with the publication of a New York Times op-ed by Lott and Breaux, entitled “How to Break the Climate Impasse.”

Americans for Carbon Dividends is funded by leading auto manufacturers, tech companies, energy companies, and trade associations from across the economy, including those in oil and gas, solar, wind, nuclear and geothermal. Americans for Carbon Dividends represents the first time that leading oil and gas companies have put their money behind a meaningful national price on carbon, and the first time that such a broad coalition of U.S. energy interests have co-funded an advocacy campaign to promote a price on carbon.

As of January 2020, corporate funders of Americans for Carbon Dividends include: AWEA, BP, Calpine, ConocoPhillips, EDF Renewables, Exelon, ExxonMobil, First Solar, Ford, GM, IBM, Shell and Vistra Energy. Leaders of Americans for Carbon Dividends include former Republican member of Congress Ryan Costello as Managing Director, Steve Rice as Managing Director and Greg Bertelsen as Executive Vice President.

== Previous organizations founded ==
=== Redefining Progress ===
In 1993, at age 25, Halstead founded Redefining Progress, an environmental economics think tank based in San Francisco with a $15,000 seed grant from Echoing Green. He served as Executive Director from 1993 to 1997.

In 1995, Redefining Progress released the Genuine Progress Indicator (GPI), an alternative to the GDP that takes social and environmental costs into account. The GPI was launched in an October 1995 cover story in The Atlantic entitled "If The Economy Is Up, Why Is America Down?" that Halstead co-authored with colleagues Clifford Cobb and Jonathan Rowe. In 1997, Redefining Progress organized the Economists' Statement on Climate Change to promote market-based solutions to climate change. Over 2,600 economists and 19 Nobel Prize winners signed the statement.

Redefining Progress and Halstead also promoted the idea of a revenue-neutral carbon tax, which the government of British Columbia was the first to implement in 2008. Halstead stepped down as executive director of Redefining Progress in 1997, moving into a position on the board. Redefining Progress closed in 2008.

=== New America ===
Halstead founded New America (formerly known as New America Foundation) in 1999, at the age of 30, and served as founding President and CEO until 2007. Under his leadership, the organization grew rapidly to a staff of 100 and an annual budget of $10 million. New America's original mission was to bring new voices and new ideas into the public debate, and to break out of the traditional liberal and conservative categories. James Fallows was the original chairman of New America's board of directors. Eric Schmidt, former Executive Chairman of Google and Alphabet Inc., served as chairman of New America's Board from 2008 to 2016.

Shortly after founding New America, Halstead and Michael Lind co-authored "The Radical Center: The Future of American Politics", which Senator John McCain described as "A political manifesto worthy of the Information Age." As a result, New America became known in its early years as a "Radical Centrist" think tank. On December 10, 2001, The Washington Post published a Styles section profile on Halstead entitled "Big Thinker: Ted Halstead's New America Foundation Has It All: Money, Brains and Buzz".

Steve Coll succeeded Halstead as President and CEO of New America in 2007. Anne-Marie Slaughter became New America's third President and CEO in 2013.

== TED Talk ==
On May 17, 2017, Halstead delivered a TED Talk entitled “A Climate Solution Where All Sides Can Win” at the 2017 TED Annual Conference in Vancouver, British Columbia. As of December 2019, that TED Talk had received over 1.5 million views and was translated into 20 languages.

Halstead began his speech by naming three barriers to climate progress: psychological, geopolitical, and partisan. He argued that the conservative carbon dividends plan that he co-wrote with leading Republican statesmen can overcome each of these barriers. He said, “I'm convinced that the road to climate progress in the United States runs through the Republican party and the business community.” Under the plan, he said, “We would end up with less regulation and far less pollution at the same time, while helping working-class Americans get ahead.”

At the end of the talk, TED curator Chris Anderson came on stage for a Q&A session with Halstead, and began by saying: "I'm not sure I've seen a conservative get a standing ovation at TED before".

== Yachting ==
In March 2008, shortly after getting married, Halstead and his wife Veronique Bardach set sail and departed westward from France aboard a 50-foot Catana catamaran yacht that they named Verite (a play on the first two letters of their names and of their dog Ria, who accompanied them).

Although Halstead and Bardach hoped to complete a circumnavigation by returning to the Mediterranean via the Red Sea, the piracy situation in the Gulf of Aden in 2012 was too dangerous. So they sold their boat in Bali, Indonesia in late 2012 after 4.5 years of non-stop sailing during which they visited five continents.

== Death ==
Halstead died on September 2, 2020, when he fell 30 meters while hiking in Es Capdellà, Spain.

== Books ==
- Ted Halstead and Michael Lind (2001). The Radical Center: The Future of American Politics. Doubleday. 264 pages. ISBN 0-385-50045-9
- Ted Halstead (2004). The Real State of The Union. Basic Books. 287 pages. ISBN 0-465-05052-2
