= Adele Morris =

American economist

- Born: 14 August 1963 (age 61)
- Education: B.S., Mathematical Sciences & Art and Art History, Rice University, 1985 M.S., Mathematics, University of Utah, 1987 PhD, Economics, Princeton University, 1999
- Occupation: Environmental economist
- Spouse: Ted Jones
- Children: Alexander Jones, Sophie Jones

Adele Cecile Morris (born 14 August 1963) is a senior fellow and policy director for Climate and Energy Economics at the Brookings Institution. Her expertise and interests include the economics of policies related to climate change, energy, natural resources, tax policy, and public finance. She was an unpaid advisor to the Hillary for America campaign.

== Education ==
- PhD, Economics, Princeton University, 1999
- M.S., Mathematics, University of Utah, 1987
- B.S., Mathematical Sciences & Art and Art History, Rice University, 1985

== Career ==
Morris joined the Brookings Institution in July 2008.

She has an extensive record of publications.

She also serves as expert referee and reviewer for Energy Economics, National Academy of Sciences, Congressional Budget Office (CBO), Climatic Change, USDA's Economic Research Service, and the UN Intergovernmental Panel on Climate Change Fourth Assessment Report (published 2007), and as grant application reviewer for the Smith Richardson Foundation.

She has worked and written extensively with Warwick McKibbin who developed the McKibbin-Sachs Global Model, a global economic model developed originally in 1984 jointly with Jeffrey Sachs and widely used intertemporal general equilibrium model of the world economy; the G-Cubed Model, a global economic model developed in 1991 jointly with Peter Wilcoxen and a widely used as multi-sector intertemporal general equilibrium model of the world economy; and the Henderson McKibbin-Taylor Rule for Monetary Policy first proposed by Dale W. Henderson and Warwick McKibbin in 1993 and simultaneously by John B. Taylor.

== Personal life ==
Dr. Morris lives with her husband, Theodore G. Jones, in McLean, Virginia.

== See also ==
- Brookings Institution
- Cap and share
- Carbon Credit
- Carbon pricing
- Carbon tax
- Economics of global warming
- Environmental economics
- Jeffrey Sachs
- Kyoto Protocol
- Warwick McKibbin
