= Economists' Statement on Carbon Dividends =

The Economists’ Statement on Carbon Dividends is a joint statement signed by over 3,500 U.S. economists promoting a carbon dividends framework for U.S. climate policy. The statement was organized by the Climate Leadership Council and originally published on January 16, 2019 in The Wall Street Journal with 45 signatories, including Nobel Prize winning economists, former chairs of the Federal Reserve, former chairs of the Council of Economic Advisors, and former secretaries of the Treasury Department.

Since its original publication, the statement has been signed by over 3,500 U.S. economists and has been recognized as the largest statement in the history of the economics profession.

== Summary ==
The statement recognizes an immediate need for climate action and offers five policy recommendations:

1. A carbon tax is the most cost-effective method of reducing carbon emissions at the necessary scale and speed.
2. The carbon tax should be revenue neutral and designed to increase every year until emissions reductions goals are met.
3. A sufficiently robust carbon tax can replace carbon regulations that are less efficient.
4. A border carbon adjustment system will prevent carbon leakage and enhance the competitiveness of American firms that are more energy-efficient that their foreign competitors.
5. The carbon tax's revenue should be distributed to U.S. citizens in equal lump-sum payments.

== Reception ==
The statement was praised for the spectrum of economic thought and political opinion represented by its signatories. Former Harvard University President and U.S. Treasury Secretary Larry Summers called the statement’s proposal “one of the few ideas of economic policy that commands broad, bipartisan support.” The Chicago Booth Review noted that it was “perhaps the closest that the economics profession has ever come to a consensus.” Former chair of the Federal Reserve and the CEA Janet Yellen praised the statement for its broader political implications, saying it “represents a major tipping point in U.S. climate policy.”

== Original Signatories ==
The original forty-five signers of the statement were (sorted alphabetically):

1. George Akerlof
2. Robert Aumann
3. Martin Baily
4. Ben Bernanke
5. Michael Boskin
6. Angus Deaton
7. Peter Diamond
8. Robert Engle
9. Eugene Fama
10. Martin Feldstein
11. Jason Furman
12. Austan Goolsbee
13. Alan Greenspan
14. Lars Hansen
15. Oliver Hart
16. Bengt Holmström
17. Glenn Hubbard
18. Daniel Kahneman
19. Alan Krueger
20. Finn Kydland
21. Edward Lazear
22. Robert Lucas
23. N. Gregory Mankiw
24. Eric Maskin
25. Daniel McFadden
26. Robert Merton
27. Roger Myerson
28. Edmund Phelps
29. Christina Romer
30. Harvey Rosen
31. Alvin Roth
32. Thomas Sargent
33. Myron Scholes
34. Amartya Sen
35. William Sharpe
36. Robert Shiller
37. George Shultz
38. Christopher Sims
39. Robert Solow
40. Michael Spence
41. Lawrence Summers
42. Richard Thaler
43. Laura Tyson
44. Paul Volcker
45. Janet Yellen
