= Michael Lind =

American writer and academic (born 1962)

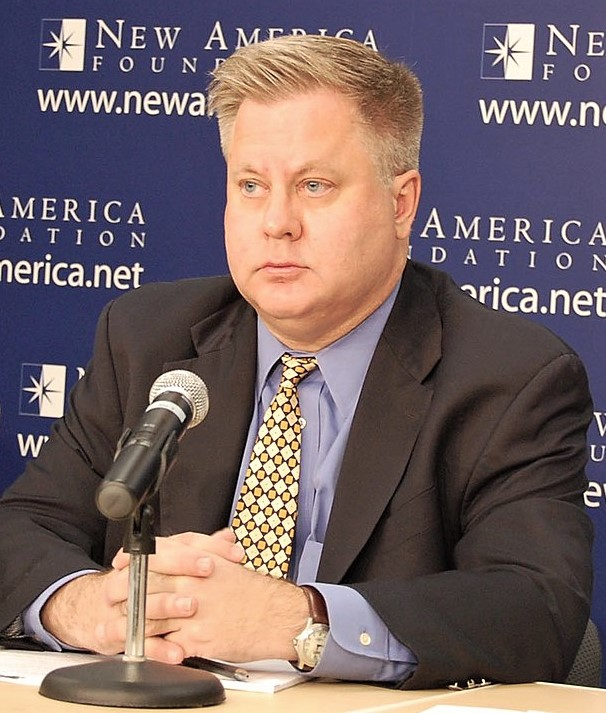
- Lind in 2009
- Born: April 23, 1962 (age 64); Austin, Texas, U.S.
- Education: University of Texas at Austin (BA, JD); Yale University (MA)
- Occupations: Writer, academic

Michael Lind (born April 23, 1962) is an American writer and academic. He has explained and defended the tradition of American democratic nationalism in a number of books, beginning with The Next American Nation: The New Nationalism and the Fourth American Revolution (1995). He is currently a professor at the Lyndon B. Johnson School of Public Affairs at the University of Texas at Austin.

== Early life ==
Lind is a fifth-generation Central Texan, of Swedish, English, Scottish and possibly German Jewish descent. Born in Austin, he was educated in Austin public schools. His father, Charles Ray Lind, was an assistant attorney general of Texas, and his mother, Marcia Hearon Lind, was a public school teacher and principal. He attended the Plan II Liberal Arts Honors Program at the University of Texas at Austin, graduating in 1982 with honors. He received a master's degree in International Relations from Yale University in 1985 and a J.D. from the University of Texas Law School in 1988.

== Career ==
Lind worked for The Heritage Foundation's State Department Assessment Project from 1988 to 1990. After working as assistant to the director of the U.S. State Department's Center for the Study of Foreign Affairs from 1990 to 1991, he was executive editor of The National Interest from 1991 to 1994. He was an editor at Harper's Magazine from 1994 to 1995, a senior editor at The New Republic from 1995 to 1996, a staff writer at The New Yorker from 1996 to 1997, and Washington Correspondent for Harper's Magazine from 1998 to 1999.

In 1999 he co-founded the New America Foundation (now New America) with Ted Halstead, Sherle Schwenninger, and Walter Russell Mead. At New America from 1999 to 2017 he was at various times Whitehead Senior Fellow, co-founder and co-director of the American Strategy Project, co-director of the Next Social Contract Initiative and an ASU Future of War Fellow.

Since 2017, he has been a professor at the Lyndon B. Johnson School of Public Affairs at the University of Texas at Austin. He has taught courses on American democracy, American political economy and American foreign policy at Harvard, Johns Hopkins, and Virginia Tech's Arlington campus. He is a visiting professor at the University of Austin.

== Views ==
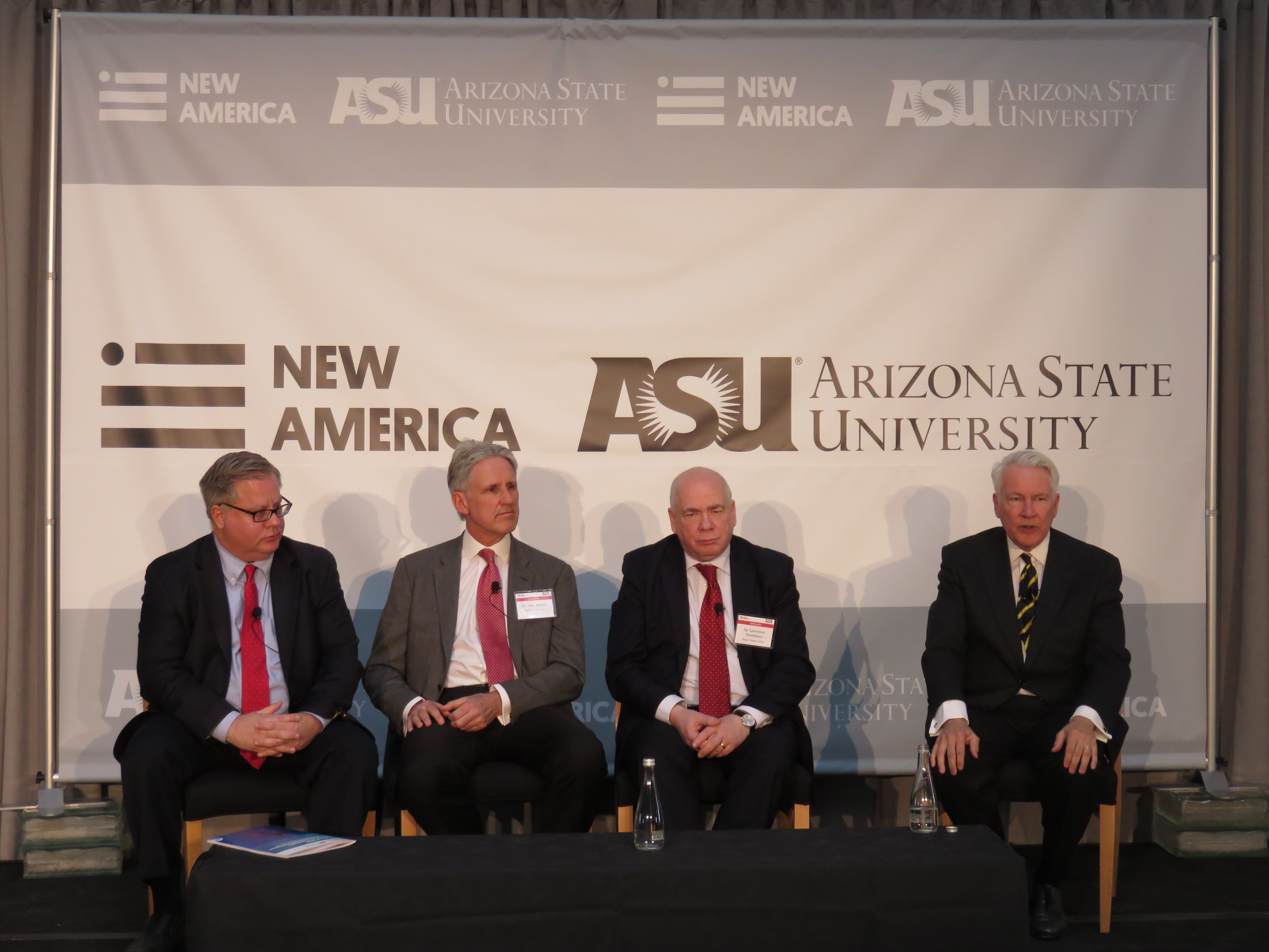
From left to right: Michael Lind, Ian Morris, Lawrence Freedman, Philip Bobbitt; "What Do Lessons from History Tell Us About the Future of War?" panel discussion at New America Foundation first annual Future of War conference, Washington, D.C., February 25, 2015

Lind has examined and defended the tradition of American democratic nationalism associated with Alexander Hamilton in a series of books, including The Next American Nation (1995), Hamilton's Republic (1997), What Lincoln Believed (2004) and Land of Promise: An Economic History of the United States (2012). Lind has also written two books on American foreign policy, The American Way of Strategy (2006) and Vietnam: The Necessary War (1999). A former neoconservative in the tradition of New Deal liberalism, with the original neoconservatives being anti-Soviet liberals who drifted to the right, Lind criticized the American right in Up From Conservatism: Why the Right is Wrong for America (1996) and Made in Texas: George W. Bush and the Southern Takeover of American Politics (2004). According to an article published in The New York Times in 1995, Lind "defies the usual political categories of left and right, liberal and conservative."

In 1995, Lind criticized the systems of jury trials and common law, arguing that civil law trials are superior to common law trials, and that the civil law model of a mixed panel of professional and lay judges is preferable to juries. On the history of trial by jury in the United States, he wrote that "from independence until the civil rights revolution, the jury was a means by which white bigots legally lynched Indians, blacks and Asians (or acquitted their white murderers). Today urban black juries all too often put race above justice in the same manner." He argued that among other things, the process of discovery was much fairer in a civil law system.

In May 2015, Lind argued for the adoption of "enlightened nationalism", also called "liberal nationalism", in which the United States "would combine its security strategy of offshore balancing with intelligent economic nationalism". Regarding NATO and other American allies, a liberal nationalist foreign policy, Lind continued, "would shift much of the burden of the defense of its allies and protectorates to those countries themselves". He has argued for "an immigration policy in the national interest would shift the emphasis from family reunification to skills ... [and] enable long-term population growth ... compatible with the economic integration and cultural assimilation of newcomers to the United States".

Lind is an outspoken critic of libertarianism. He had observed that of the 195 countries in the world today, none is fully a libertarian society:

If libertarianism was a good idea, wouldn't at least one country have tried it? Wouldn't there be at least one country, out of nearly two hundred, with minimal government, free trade, open borders, decriminalized drugs, no welfare state and no public education system?

== Works ==
=== Nonfiction ===
- (2023) Hell to Pay: How the Suppression of Wages is Destroying America. Penguin Random House. ISBN 9780593421253.
- (2020) The New Class War: Saving Democracy From The Managerial Elite. Penguin Random House. ISBN 9780593083697.
- (2018) Big Is Beautiful: Debunking the Myth of Small Business (with Robert D. Atkinson). MIT Press. ISBN 9780262037709.
- (2012) Land of Promise: An Economic History of the United States. HarperCollins. ISBN 9780062097729.
- (2006) The American Way of Strategy: U.S. Foreign Policy and The American Way of Life. Oxford University Press. ISBN 9780198042143.
- (2005) What Lincoln Believed: The Values and Convictions of America's Greatest President. Doubleday. ISBN 9780385507394.
- (2003) Made in Texas: George W. Bush and the Southern Takeover of American Politics. Basic Books. ISBN 9780465041213.
- (2001) The Radical Center: The Future of American Politics (with Ted Halstead). Doubleday. ISBN 9780385500456.
- (1999) Vietnam: The Necessary War: A Reinterpretation of America's Most Disastrous Military Conflict. Free Press. ISBN 9780684842547.
- (1997) Hamilton's Republic: Readings in the American Democratic Nationalist Tradition (editor). Free Press. ISBN 9780684831602.
- (1996) Up From Conservatism: Why the Right is Wrong for America. Free Press. ISBN 9780684827612.
- (1995) The Next American Nation: The New Nationalism and the Fourth American Revolution. Free Press. ISBN 9780029191033.

=== Fiction and poetry ===
- (2007) Parallel Lives. Etruscan Press. ISBN 9780974599588.
- (2003) Bluebonnet Girl. Henry Holt. ISBN 9780805065732.
- (2002) When You Are Someone Else. Aralia Press.
- (1997) The Alamo: An Epic. Houghton Mifflin. ISBN 9780395827581.
- (1996) Powertown. HarperCollins. ISBN 9780060175108.
