= Land of Promise: An Economic History of the United States =

2012 book by Michael Lind

- First edition cover
- Author: Michael Lind
- Language: English
- Genre: non-fiction
- Publisher: HarperCollins, New York City
- Publication date: April 17, 2012
- Publication place: United States
- Media type: Hardback and eBook
- Pages: 586
- ISBN: 978-0-06-183480-6

Land of Promise: An Economic History of the United States is a book on the economic history of the United States of America by Michael Lind, first published in 2012 by HarperCollins. Omitting the economic circumstances of colonial America, it comprises a time frame that ranges from the Revolutionary War to the Great Recession. The book goes beyond re-narrating events by continually interpreting causes and effects as suggested by a view of history as linear, and its approach towards economics is of a decisively anti-libertarian nature which is exemplified by statements like "what is good about the American economy is largely the result of the Hamiltonian [...] tradition, and what is bad about it is largely the result of the Jeffersonian [...] school." While naturally preoccupied with the past, Land of Promise also looks ahead, makes conjectures about the future of America's economy and "ends on as optimistic a note as the title suggests, though it also acknowledges that failure is an option."

== Title ==
The title "Land of Promise" is alluding to an expression for the United States that was coined by George Washington in 1785 and partly pertained to the promise of economic growth. In Lind's view, that promise is still valid, even in the face of economic slowdowns and other difficulties, because a look at history reveals how Americans have always been capable of reversing a crisis into its opposite.

== Contents ==
The book is divided into four major chapters that are preceded by an introduction named "A Land of Promise". In that introduction, Lind uses the example of Paterson, New Jersey, to show the decisive changes, the American economy has undergone since the late eighteenth century. According to Lind, there are three American Republics so far, accompanied as they were by three industrial revolutions.

"The First Republic of the United States was founded on water and undermined by steam" which is why Paterson could become an early industrial center due to its advantageous location at the Great Falls of the Passaic River. During the Second American Republic, "Paterson reinvented itself by taking advantage of technological innovation" such as electricity and aviation and thus soon came to be nicknamed Aviation City. However, as the Third American Republic unfolded after World War II, Paterson failed to repeat that process of reinvention and had to cede its status to such newly influential places like Silicon Valley which symbolized the onset of the Digital Revolution.

Throughout the following chapters, Lind tries to show how not only Paterson, but the United States as a whole underwent three industrial revolutions and three republics: The First Republic started after the Revolutionary War and experienced the first industrial revolution in the early nineteenth century. The Second Republic started after the Civil War and experienced the second industrial revolution around the turn of the century, whereas the Third Republic began after the Great Depression and was already more than thirty years old when the third industrial revolution set in during the 1980s.

== Magistra Vitae ==
In compliance with the belief that there are lessons to be learnt from history, in Land of Promise Lind explicitly contradicts Henry Ford who once claimed that there was nothing useful about historiography. Accordingly, Lind tends to agree with Cicero, whose De oratore contains the famous statement historia magistra vitae est (history is the teacher of life). If combined with the theory of the business cycle, that view suggests to take a look at historically successful economic policy for the purpose of preventing economic crises or attaining economic recovery. Quite consequently, Lind uses the perception of history as a teacher to justify his hostility towards libertarianism, arguing that it "has never even been tried on the scale of a modern nation-state, even a small one, anywhere in the world" and that it is thus unlikely to succeed.

Also the common thread of Land of Promise, namely the superiority of Hamiltonianism compared to Jeffersonianism, is explained by lessons drawn from history according to Lind. In an interview with Boston Review, he said:

"My argument is that periods of Hamiltonian nation-building and rebuilding, like the 1790s–1820s, 1860s–1890s and 1930s–1960s, are followed by periods of Jeffersonian backlash, including the 1830s–1860s, the 1900s–1930s, and the 1970s–present. The neo-Jeffersonians trim back accomplishments of the previous Hamiltonian generation—national banking, emancipation, New Deal social programs—but usually fail to repeal them. As a result, the U.S. progresses at a pace of two steps forward, one step back. [...] Right on schedule, the heroic Hamiltonian projects of national reconstruction that began with the New Deal and lasted through World War II and the Great Society program and the Civil Rights Revolution were followed by a generation-long backlash led by nostalgic Jeffersonian reactionaries. The first was Jimmy Carter, a conservative Democrat who played the role of the Southern Jeffersonian country boy. He and his allies dismantled much of the New Deal in the name of deregulation, leaving his equally Jeffersonian successor Reagan little to deregulate."

== Critical reception ==
While generally praised for its readability due to numerous anecdotes and asserted historical accuracy, the book received criticism for its relentless promotion of Hamiltonianism.

David Leonhardt of The New York Times, for instance, lauded several aspects of the book, such as the provision of "small, little-known stories [and] Lind's attempt to rehabilitate figures to whom history has not been kind." However, Leonhardt also expressed some scepticism about the book's undeviating fondness of Hamiltonianism: "Lind never quite explains how the United States has ended up as the richest large country in the world, with per capita income about 20 percent higher than Sweden's or Canada's, almost 30 percent higher than Germany's and almost 500 percent higher than China's. If anything, other countries have pursued more Hamiltonian policies in many ways than the United States, without quite the same success."

Quite similarly, Stanford University professor Jack N. Rakove wrote an undecided review of Land of Promise for The New Republic, acknowledging that "Lind offers countless apt observations about American economic development, and with or without his interpretive scheme, any reader will learn much about that history" but also criticizing "the idea that Americans should be either natural-born Hamiltonians or Jeffersonians [a]s a primitive way of explaining how the energy of economic activity pulses through [the] political and legal system."

The blog website Daily Kos ran an outspokenly positive review that concentrated on the topicality of the book's final pages: "Between Lind's specific insights on size, regulation, and private-public hybrids, and his ability to provide the Big Overview, one can begin to see the contours of how a workable Fourth Republic could come into being as we find ourselves in the midst of convulsive global change. Land of Promise is an invaluable tool in exploring where we've been, how we arrived at the perilous economic place in which we stand now, and how we can find our way back to more income equality and stability in the years ahead."

Publishers Weekly gave a short and largely neutral account of the book, stating that Lind "offers a prescription for how the next Hamiltonian cycle should fix matters, but asserts that Jeffersonianism rules today [and] paints a vivid if dismal picture."

Equally short but considerably more judging was the article in Kirkus Reviews which praised Lind's versatile approach and summarized the book as "timely, big-picture analysis that supplies vital context to our current economic and political moment."

In the June 2012 issue of The American Conservative, James Pinkerton published a very positive assessment of Land of Promise that mainly focused on the book's tendency to question the bipolarity of American politics by arguing that Alexander Hamilton could hardly be located anywhere in today's political spectrum, thereby suggesting that the United States are in need of a third alternative. The praise eventually resulted in the plain conclusion: "Thus Lind's book emerges as a fresh and bold challenge to the status quo."

== See also ==
- Economy of the United States
- Fiscal conservatism
- Small government
- Laissez-faire
- Reaganomics
- Keynesian economics
- Supply-side economics
- Comparisons between the Great Recession and the Great Depression

== Bibliography ==
Lind, Michael (2012). Land of Promise: An Economic History of the United States. New York: Harper Collins. ISBN 978-0-06-183480-6.
