= William Baldwin (journalist) =

American journalist (born 1951)

- Born: January 1951 (age 75); New Canaan, Connecticut, U.S.
- Education: Harvard University (1973)
- Occupations: Editor, Writer, Journalist
- Employer: Forbes
- Website: Forbes Blog

William Baldwin (born January 1951) is an investment strategies editor at Forbes Media. He has held this position since September 2010. Before that, he was an editor of Forbes magazine for 11 years. Baldwin graduated from Harvard University with a degree in linguistics and applied math in 1973. He has been an Enrolled Agent since 1979 and a member of the Pigou Club since 2006. He is married and has two children.

Baldwin's feature articles have covered such topics as how to find value stocks abroad, how to integrate lifestyle choices into investment allocation decisions, and how to invest in master limited partnerships.

Baldwin's monthly columns for the magazine discuss retirement annuities, carving up a portfolio to save on taxes, and using exchange-traded funds to invest in commodities. His blog has delved into inflation hedges, how to bet against Ben Bernanke's money-printing scheme, and how to extract unusual tax benefits from Roth retirement accounts.

William Baldwin has also given talks on tax-efficient investing at the American Institute of Economic Research, at the Theater Communications Group Governance Forum, and on Forbes investment seminar cruises.
