= Gilbert E. Metcalf =

American economist

- Occupation: Academic economist (Ph.D. in economics from Harvard University)
- Employer: Tufts University
- Title: John DiBiaggio Professor of Citizenship and Public Service at Tufts University
- Term: 1994-2022

Gilbert E. Metcalf is the John DiBiaggio Professor of Citizenship and Public Service, emeritus at Tufts University, where he was a professor of economics. Currently, he is a visiting professor at the MIT Sloan School as well as a research associate at the National Bureau of Economic Research and a University Fellow at Resources For The Future. Under the Obama administration, he served as the deputy assistant secretary for environment and energy at the U.S. Department of Treasury where he was the founding U.S. Board Member for the UN based Green Climate Fund. His research interests are in the areas of energy, environmental, and climate policy.

== Biography ==
Metcalf was born in Utica, New York, and earned a B.A. in mathematics from Amherst College in 1976. He subsequently earned an M.S. in resource economics from the University of Massachusetts in 1982 and a Ph.D. in economics from Harvard University in 1988, where Martin Feldstein served as his primary advisor. His first academic appointment was in the department of economics at Princeton University where he taught from 1988 to 1994. In 1994, he moved to Tufts University, first as an assistant professor (1994–1997), then as an associate professor (1997–1999) and then as a full professor (1999–present). In 2018 he was appointed to the John DiBiaggio Professorship of Citizenship and Public Service. While at Tufts, Metcalf has held visiting appointments in the department of economics at MIT, and Harvard's Kennedy School of Government. In 2017 he was a visiting scholar at the Kleinman Center for Energy Policy at the University of Pennsylvania. In 2011–2012, Metcalf served as the deputy assistant secretary for environment and energy at the U.S. Department of Treasury where he oversaw the U.S. government's engagement in multilateral environmental funds including the Climate Investment Funds, the Global Environment Facility, and the Green Climate Fund. Metcalf served as a member of the board of the Association of Environmental and Resource Economists in 2014 - 2016 where he led efforts to endow the Oates Memorial Fund to support AERE's annual Outstanding Dissertation Award. AERE members and friends contributed and pledged over $37,000 in the first year of fundraising to the fund. In 2011, he served as the vice president for academic affairs for the United States Association for Energy Economics (USAEE). He currently serves as a lead author for the Working Group III contribution to the IPCC Sixth Assessment Report. In other professional service, Metcalf has been an associate editor of the Journal of Economic Perspectives (2008–2010) and a member of the board of editors of the American Economic Review (2000–2006). He currently serves on the advisory board of Citizens' Climate Lobby and the board of editors of the Review of Environmental Economics and Policy. Metcalf's university service includes acting as chair of the Department of Economics (2002–2005) and serving as a member of the presidential search committee that hired Lawrence Bacow in 2001. Metcalf subsequently chaired the Task Force on the Undergraduate Experience which developed a number of recommendations for enhancing undergraduate life and scholarship at Tufts.

== Research ==
Metcalf's research area is in the areas of public finance, tax policy, energy economics, and environmental economics. According to IDEAS/REPEC, Metcalf ranks in the top three percent of economists worldwide on the basis of research. He has over 7200 citations in Google Scholar and an h-index of 39. Metcalf has published over 130 papers, book chapters, and other publications including 3 edited books. His newest book, Paying for Pollution: Why a Carbon Tax is Good for America, was published by Oxford University Press at the end of 2018.

=== Tax Policy ===
Metcalf's early research focused on the fiscal interaction between federal tax policy and state and local government budgets. An early paper with Martin Feldstein challenged the view that eliminating the federal deduction for state and local taxes would affect overall spending at the state and local level. The paper did find that sub-national governments would change their portfolio of tax collections to rely less heavily on taxes that are no longer deductible and more heavily on those taxes that continue to be deductible, including business taxes. Metcalf also wrote a series of papers on the role of tax-exempt financing in state and local borrowing. Metcalf subsequently wrote a series of papers on value-added taxation that argued, among other things, that standard distributional analyses overstate the regressivity of a VAT tax. Another set of papers focused on the role of uncertainty in tax policy and its impact on investment using stochastic calculus techniques and the work by Robert Pindyck and Avinash Dixit on irreversible investment in the face of uncertainty.

=== Energy and Environmental Economics ===
In the early 1990s, Metcalf, in a series of papers with Kevin Hassett, assessed the role of federal tax policy to encourage greater energy efficiency investments in which they challenged the view that high hurdle rates for these investments reflected a market failure. They argued that a variety of alternative explanations could explain the slow take-up of energy efficient capital and that the case for a market failure necessitating government intervention had not been made. Metcalf has gone on to write other papers arguing for the role of tax policy to address market failures such as pollution that could incentivize investments in energy efficiency. Along with Don Fullerton, Metcalf has written a series of papers examining the optimal tax on pollution in a second-best world (the double dividend hypothesis). Their work focused on the role of scarcity rents to explain why the optimal tax on pollution should be less than the marginal damages from the pollutant. Other research focuses on energy security, and subsidies for energy investment and production. In one recent paper, Metcalf argues that eliminating tax incentives for oil and gas production would save roughly $4 billion a year for the federal government and have a negligible impact on energy prices and domestic production.

=== Climate Policy ===
Recently, Metcalf has focused on policy design and evaluation to address climate change. His extensive work on carbon taxation has been highly cited. He has written papers on the distributional burden of carbon taxes, arguing that the view that carbon taxes are regressive is incorrect when 1) lifetime incidence is considered; and 2) the use of proceeds from the tax is taken into account. In particular, he has argued for a revenue neutral carbon tax to avoid conflating issues of the appropriate size of the federal budget and climate policy. Recent work focuses on how a carbon tax can be designed to provide some assurance that emission reduction targets will be met over time. In particular, he has advocated for an emissions assurance mechanism (EAM) to address concerns that a carbon tax will not necessarily reduce emissions. The Climate Leadership Council has included an EAM as part of its plan. Other climate related work focuses on international linkage of regional climate policies and the role of integrated assessment models in climate policy design.
