= Carbon fee and dividend =

Variant of carbon tax that restricts revenue use to direct payments to the people

Concept of a carbon fee and dividend

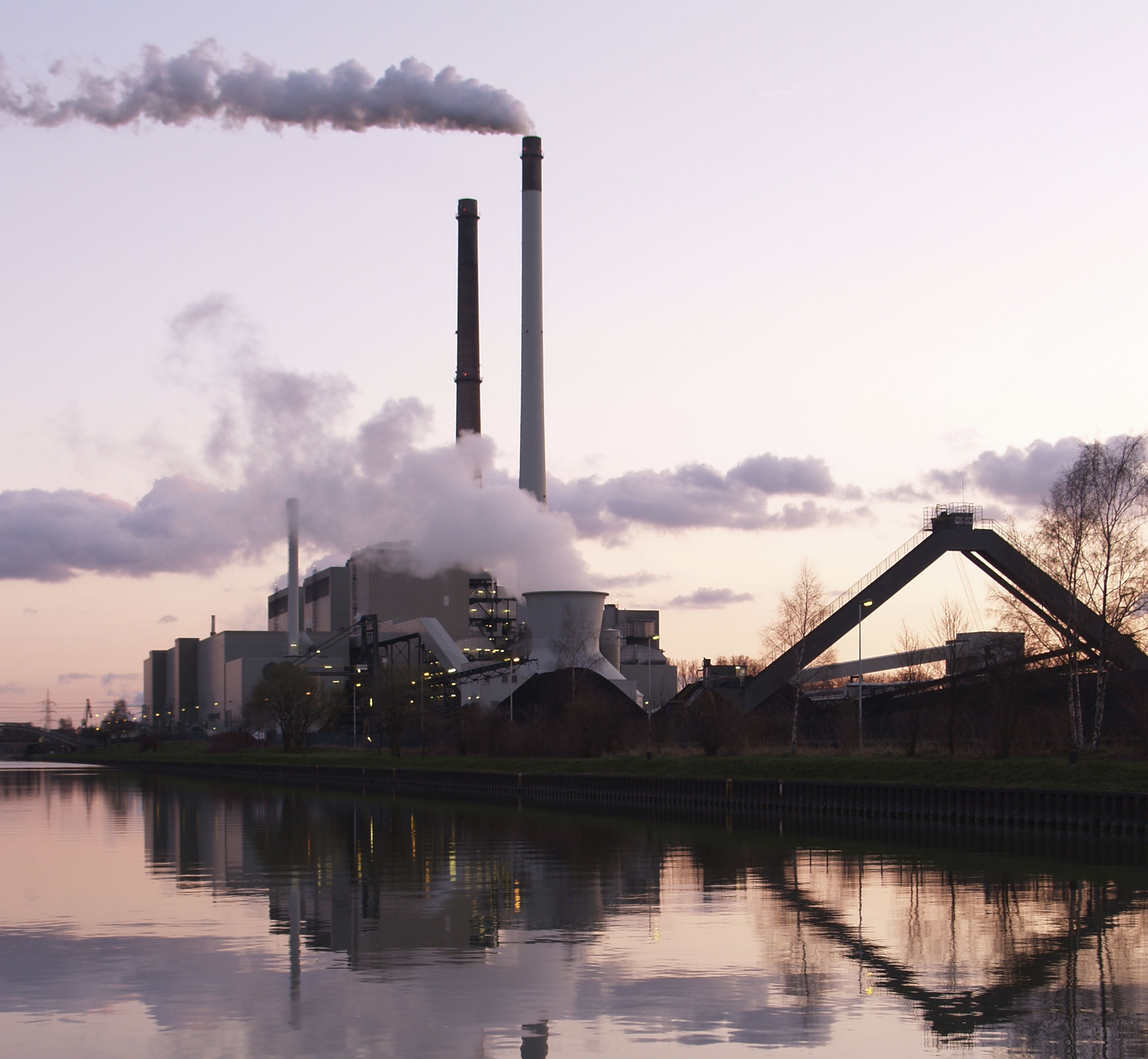
A coal power plant in Germany. Fee and dividend will make fossil fuels – coal, oil, and gas – less competitive as a fuel than other options.

A carbon fee and dividend or climate income is a system to reduce greenhouse gas emissions and address climate change. The system imposes a carbon tax on the sale of fossil fuels, and then distributes the revenue of this tax over the entire population (equally, on a per-person basis) as a monthly income or regular payment.

Since the adoption of the system in Canada and Switzerland, it has gained increased interest worldwide as a cross-sector and socially just approach to reducing emissions and tackling climate change.

Designed to maintain or improve economic vitality while speeding the transition to a sustainable energy economy, carbon fee and dividend has been proposed as an alternative to emission reduction mechanisms such as complex regulatory approaches, cap and trade or a straightforward carbon tax. While there is general agreement among scientists and economists on the need for a carbon tax, economists are generally neutral on specific uses for the revenue, though there tends to be more support than opposition for returning the revenue as a dividend to taxpayers.

== Structure ==
The basic structure of carbon fee and dividend is as follows:

1. A fee is levied on fuels at their point of origin into the economy, such as the well, mine, or port of entry. The fee is based upon the carbon content of a given fuel, with a commonly-proposed starting point being $10–16 /t of carbon that would be emitted once the fuel is burned.
2. The fee is progressively increased, providing a steady, predictable price signal and incentivizing early transition to low-carbon energy sources and products.
3. A border tax adjustment is levied on imports from nations that lack their own equivalent fee on carbon. For example, if the United States legislated a carbon fee-and-dividend system, China would face the choice of paying carbon fees to the United States or creating its own internal carbon pricing system. This would leverage American economic power to incentivize carbon pricing around the world.
4. Some or all of the fee is returned to households as an energy dividend. Returning 100% of net fees results in a revenue-neutral carbon fee-and-dividend system; this revenue neutrality often appeals to conservatives, such as former Secretary of State George Shultz, who want to reduce emissions without increasing the size and funding of the federal government.

In order to maximize effectiveness, the amount of the fee would be regulated based on the scientific assessments from both economic and climate science in order to balance the size and speed of fee progression.

== Advantages ==
A climate income has several notable advantages over other emission reduction mechanisms:

- Social justice and acceptability. While there is broad scientific consensus that a carbon tax is the most powerful way to reduce emissions, such a tax necessarily increases prices and the cost of living. By handing out the revenue of this tax as a universal climate income, the price rise is largely compensated. It has been calculated that in total, low and middle incomes would go up under a system of climate income.
- Market based and cross-sector. Unlike complex regulatory approaches, a fossil fuel fee allows market forces to reduce emissions in the most efficient and cost effective way.
- Cross-sector. There is a broad range of sources of carbon emissions. Regulatory approaches and emissions trading often address only one or a couple of sectors. A truly universal fossil fuel fee addresses all these sectors at once. Moreover, through a universal price on CO_{2}-equivalent emissions, the fee can cover other greenhouse gases (such as methane and nitrous oxide) or emission sectors (industry, agriculture) as well.
- Compatible. The mechanism is compatible with other measures and regulations imposed by the government, such as investments in education, research and infrastructure.
- Revenue neutral. A climate income would not increase the budget of the government, or utilise the imposed carbon fee as a means to balance the government deficit.

== Studies ==
Net income of the global oil and gas industry reached a record US$4 trillion in 2022.

After recovering from the COVID-19 pandemic, energy company profits increased with greater revenues from higher fuel prices resulting from the Russian invasion of Ukraine, falling debt levels, tax write-downs of projects shut down in Russia, and backing off from earlier plans to reduce greenhouse gas emissions. Record profits sparked public calls for windfall taxes.

=== Energy Modeling Forum study 2012 ===
In late 2012 the Energy Modeling Forum (EMF), coordinated by Stanford University, released its EMF 29 study titled "The role of border carbon adjustment in unilateral climate policy". It is well understood that unilateral climate policy can lead to emissions leakage. As one example, trade-exposed emissions-intensive industries may simply relocate to regions with laxer climate protection. A border carbon adjustment (BCA) program can help counter this and related effects. Under such a policy, tariffs are levied on the carbon embodied in imported goods from unregulated trading partners while the original climate protection payments for exported goods are rebated. The study finds that the BCA programs evaluated:

- can reduce emissions leakage
- yield modest gains in global economic efficiency
- shift substantial costs from abating OECD counties to non-abating non-OECD countries

In light of these findings, the study recommends care when designing and implementing BCA programs. Moreover, the regressive impact of shifting part of the abatement burden southward conflicts with the UNFCCC principle of common but differentiated responsibility and respective capabilities, which explicitly acknowledges that developing countries have less ability to shoulder climate protection measures.

=== Regional Economic Models study 2014 ===
A 2014 economic impact analysis by Regional Economic Models, Incorporated (REMI) concluded that a carbon fee that began at US$10 per ton and increased by US$10 per year, with all net revenue returned to households as an energy dividend, would carry substantial environmental, health, and economic benefits:

- CO_{2} emissions in the United States would decrease to 50% of 1990 levels in the first 20 years.
- Over the same timespan, reductions in airborne pollution that accompanies CO_{2} emissions would result in 230,000 fewer premature deaths.
- Regular dividend payments would stimulate the U.S. economy, leading to the creation of 2.8 million jobs over baseline during the program's first two decades.
- The stimulative effect was also found to positively affect national GDP, adding $70–85 billion/year for a cumulative 20-year increase of $1.375 trillion over baseline (the approximate equivalent of adding an additional year of growth during that span).

=== International Institute for Applied Systems Analysis study 2016 ===
A 2016 working paper from the International Institute for Applied Systems Analysis (IIASA) looked more narrowly at the impact of a proposed carbon fee and dividend on American households during the first year. Due to the shorter window analyzed (which did not allow for considerations of changes to personal energy use under the policy) the paper found a smaller percentage of households benefiting from carbon fee and dividend than the REMI report summarized above (53% versus approximately two-thirds in the REMI report). It also found that an additional 19% of households suffered a loss of less than 0.2% of annual income, an amount that might be experienced as effectively "breaking even" by households in the upper income quintiles most likely affected.

== Implementation ==
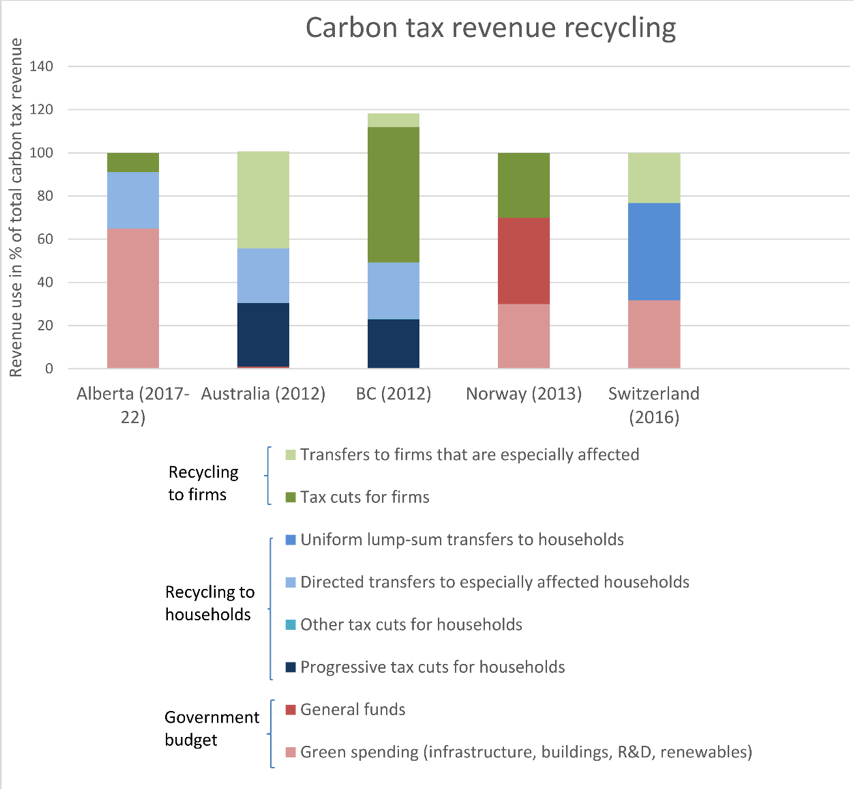
Revenue recycling in real-world carbon tax schemes

As of July 2022, there were eight jurisdictions globally implementing a form of carbon fee and dividend: Switzerland, Austria and Alberta, Ontario, Manitoba, Saskatchewan, Yukon and British Columbia in Canada.

=== Switzerland ===
The Swiss carbon tax redistributes around two thirds of its revenue to residents, including children, and to businesses (in proportion to their payroll). The remaining third is invested in a building energy efficiency program and a clean technology fund. Residents receive the dividend on an annual basis via their health insurance bill. This approach was chosen for practical reasons according to Mildenberger et al. (2022) – health insurance is mandatory for all residents in Switzerland and the same process was already being used to distribute funds from the volatile organic compounds tax. However, the authors note that the approach may contribute to low levels of awareness of the dividend amongst the public. Their 2019 survey of 1,050 residents found that just 11.8% of respondents were aware that most funds are redistributed to residents and businesses, while only 14.7% of respondents were aware that the dividend was paid to them via a discount on their annual health insurance bill. Regular and more direct payment methods (e.g. monthly cash payments) would likely increase the salience of the dividend for residents.

The Swiss carbon tax and dividend scheme commenced in 2008 when voluntary measures failed to meet intermediate targets linked to Switzerland's Kyoto Protocol commitments, as legislated under its Federal Act on the Reduction of CO_{2} Emissions ("CO_{2} Act"). The carbon tax applies only to fossil fuels used to generate heat, light or electricity in the building sector and parts of the industry sector. Sectors excluded from the scheme (transport, agriculture, waste and around 60% of the industry sector) are instead regulated under either the Swiss Emissions Trading Scheme or the non EHS program. Overall, the carbon tax accounts for around one third of greenhouse gas emissions in Switzerland.

The carbon tax was introduced at CHF 12 per ton of CO_{2} equivalent (CO_{2}-e) and has risen by CHF 12 periodically until reaching its current rate of CHF 96 in 2018. The impacts on emissions from the scheme are estimated to be a reduction of around 6.9 million tons of CO_{2}-e between 2008 and 2015. An evaluation by the Federal Office of the Environment found the scheme to be highly efficient for reducing emissions.

On 13 June 2021, despite having the support of almost all major political parties, a public referendum vote rejected (51.6% against) new laws that would expand the carbon tax to cover the transport sector and increase the tax rate from CHF 120 to CHF 210 per ton by 2030. Mildenberger et al. (2022) note that the dividend aspect of the scheme did not play a prominent role in public debate in the lead up to the referendum, which instead focussed heavily on the costs of the carbon tax. The authors suggest that this was a missed opportunity to raise awareness of the dividend and reflect on its function and benefits to date. The Swiss Government has since proposed new amendments to the laws which would maintain the tax rate of CHF 120 per ton of emissions but continue to exclude the transportation sector.

=== Canada ===
Four provinces and two territories currently operate a form of carbon fee and dividend in Canada.

Alberta, Ontario, Manitoba, Saskatchewan, Yukon and Nunavat use the federal carbon tax system, the Federal Fuel Charge, which started in 2019. Of these, all but Nunavat have a carbon fee and dividend scheme in place that redistributes tax revenue to the public. New Brunswick used the scheme from April 2019 to March 2020, but has since implemented its own carbon tax which recycles revenue back into the economy, but not as a dividend to consumers.

The carbon fee and dividend systems in these jurisdictions have been implemented as part of the federal government's Carbon Pricing Backstop policy (see Carbon pricing in Canada). Alberta, Ontario, Manitoba and Saskatchewan did not voluntarily implement the policy, therefore dividend payments in these jurisdictions are managed federally as Climate Action Incentive payments, whereby revenue from the fuel charge in each jurisdiction is redistributed directly to households (one person per household, based on the number of adults and children within the household). Rural households receive a 10% increase of the dividend.

Initially, Climate Action Incentive payments were made annually via federal income tax credits. However, from April 2022, the dividends have been paid on a quarterly basis in ‘cash’ (by cheque or direct deposit).

Yukon and Nunavut implemented the federal carbon fee system voluntarily and as such, the revenue is returned to those governments to redistribute. Yukon pays 100% of the revenue as dividends to Yukon businesses (49.5%), individuals (45%), municipal governments (3%) and first nations governments (2.5%). Nunavut has implemented the Nunavut Carbon Rebate which rather than using a dividend to the public, redistributes funds via a 50% subsidy on home heating oil, vehicle diesel and other fuels at the point of sale.

All six provinces and territories applying Federal Fuel Fee use the same carbon price. The fee was introduced in 2019 at CAD $20 per ton of CO_{2}-e, rising by $10 annually to $50 per ton in 2022. From 2023, the fuel fee will rise by CAD $15 per year until it reaches $170 per ton of CO_{2}-e in 2030.

The British Columbia carbon tax, implemented in 2008, could be considered as ‘fee and dividend’, although there are some differences. Rather than entirely or mostly being returned as a dividend to households, most of the revenue is used to provide tax cuts for businesses (around 55% of revenue) and individuals (around 23%). The dividend component comes in the form of a tax credit to low- and middle-income families and accounts for around 17% of carbon tax revenue. As of 1 July 2022, the maximum amount an adult (and their partner) can receive is CAD $193.50 annually, paid in quarterly instalments, and $56.50 per child.

The policy is popular amongst residents in British Columbia, with polls showing between 55% and 65% support for the tax.

=== Austria ===
In July 2022, Austria implemented a carbon tax and dividend, which will be paid in the form of a 'climate bonus' of €100 to €200 per year, depending on where they live (e.g. those in rural areas will receive a larger dividend) and their access to public transport. The carbon tax rate commenced at €35 per ton of CO_{2}-e and will rise to €55 per ton by 2025. All residents, regardless of citizenship and age, will receive the bonus provided they had resided in Austria for six months. The dividend will be paid directly by cheque or bank deposit.

Country	Jurisdiction	Year started	Price of CO_{2}	Dividend payment	Payment vehicle
Austria		2022	2022 - €35 per ton of CO_{2}-e in 2022, rising to €55 per ton by 2025	A €100 to €200 payment to all residents, regardless of age and citizenship	Direct payments to individuals (cheque or bank deposit), paid annually
Canada	British Columbia	2008	2008-09 CAD $10 2009-10 CAD $15 2010-11 CAD $20 2011-12 CAD $25 2012-18 CAD $30 2018-19 CAD $35 2019-21 CAD $40 2021-22 CAD $45 2022-23 CAD $50	~17% of revenue paid as dividend to low- and middle-income households via tax credits The remainder is used to fund tax cuts for businesses (~55%) and individuals (~23%)	Dividend to low- and middle-income households: direct payments, combined with the federal goods and services tax/harmonized sales tax (GST/HST) credit into one quarterly payment
Canada	Alberta	2020	Per ton of CO_{2}-e: 2019 – CAD $20* 2020 – CAD $30 2021 – CAD $40 2022 – CAD $50 2023 – CAD $65 2024 – CAD $80 2025 – CAD $95 2026 – CAD $110 2027 – CAD $125 2028 – CAD $140 2029 – CAD $155 2030 – CAD $170 *Alberta had its own carbon tax in place in 2019 before switching to the federal system	90% to households and 10% to ‘particularly affected sectors, including small businesses, schools, and hospitals’. Payments take household size (adults and children) into account. +10% supplement for rural households.	Apr 2019-Mar 2022: Paid annually via income tax credits. Apr 2022 onwards: Paid quarterly via cheque or bank deposit.
Canada	Ontario	2019	Per ton of CO_{2}-e: 2019 – CAD $20* 2020 – CAD $30 2021 – CAD $40 2022 – CAD $50 2023 – CAD $65 2024 – CAD $80 2025 – CAD $95 2026 – CAD $110 2027 – CAD $125 2028 – CAD $140 2029 – CAD $155 2030 – CAD $170 *Alberta had its own carbon tax in place in 2019 before switching to the federal system	90% to households and 10% to ‘particularly affected sectors, including small businesses, schools, and hospitals’. Payments take household size (adults and children) into account. +10% supplement for rural households.	Apr 2019-Mar 2022: Paid annually via income tax credits. Apr 2022 onwards: Paid quarterly via cheque or bank deposit.
Canada	Manitoba	2019	Per ton of CO_{2}-e: 2019 – CAD $20* 2020 – CAD $30 2021 – CAD $40 2022 – CAD $50 2023 – CAD $65 2024 – CAD $80 2025 – CAD $95 2026 – CAD $110 2027 – CAD $125 2028 – CAD $140 2029 – CAD $155 2030 – CAD $170 *Alberta had its own carbon tax in place in 2019 before switching to the federal system	90% to households and 10% to ‘particularly affected sectors, including small businesses, schools, and hospitals’. Payments take household size (adults and children) into account. +10% supplement for rural households.	Apr 2019-Mar 2022: Paid annually via income tax credits. Apr 2022 onwards: Paid quarterly via cheque or bank deposit.
Canada	Saskatchewan	2019	Per ton of CO_{2}-e: 2019 – CAD $20* 2020 – CAD $30 2021 – CAD $40 2022 – CAD $50 2023 – CAD $65 2024 – CAD $80 2025 – CAD $95 2026 – CAD $110 2027 – CAD $125 2028 – CAD $140 2029 – CAD $155 2030 – CAD $170 *Alberta had its own carbon tax in place in 2019 before switching to the federal system	90% to households and 10% to ‘particularly affected sectors, including small businesses, schools, and hospitals’. Payments take household size (adults and children) into account. +10% supplement for rural households.	Apr 2019-Mar 2022: Paid annually via income tax credits. Apr 2022 onwards: Paid quarterly via cheque or bank deposit.
Canada	Yukon	2019	Per ton of CO_{2}-e: 2019 – CAD $20* 2020 – CAD $30 2021 – CAD $40 2022 – CAD $50 2023 – CAD $65 2024 – CAD $80 2025 – CAD $95 2026 – CAD $110 2027 – CAD $125 2028 – CAD $140 2029 – CAD $155 2030 – CAD $170 *Alberta had its own carbon tax in place in 2019 before switching to the federal system	Businesses - 49.5%; Individuals (aged 19+) - 45% (+10% remote supplement for those living outside Whitehorse); Municipal governments - 3%; First nations governments - 2.5%	Businesses – Income tax credits. Individuals - Quarterly rebates paid directly to individuals.
Switzerland		2008	Per ton of CO_{2}-e: 2008 - CHF 12 2009 - CHF 24 2012 - CHF 36 2014 - CHF 60 2016 - CHF 84 2018 - CHF 96	67% for citizens and companies	Discount on annual health insurance bill

== Political support ==
=== United States ===
Carbon fee and dividend is the preferred climate solution of Citizens' Climate Lobby (CCL). Citizens' Climate Lobby argues that a fee-and-dividend policy will be easier to adopt and adjust than relatively complicated cap-and-trade or regulatory approaches, enabling a smooth, economically positive transition to a low-carbon energy economy. James Hansen, Director of the NASA Goddard Institute for Space Studies has frequently promoted awareness of carbon fee and dividend through his writings and frequent public appearances, as well as his position at Columbia University.

A Carbon Dividends plan has been proposed by the Climate Leadership Council, which counts among its members 27 Nobel laureates, 15 Fortune 100 companies, all four past chairs of the Federal Reserve, and over 3000 US economists. Among those supporting the Climate Leadership Council's Carbon Dividends Plan are Greg Mankiw, Larry Summers, James Baker, Henry Paulson, Ted Halstead, and Ray Dalio. It claims to be the most popular, equitable and pro-growth climate solution.

Inspired by the market-friendly structure of carbon fee and dividend, Republican Congressman Bob Inglis introduced H.R. 2380 (the 'Raise Wages, Cut Carbon Act of 2009') in the U.S. House of Representatives on May 13, 2009. Concerned about energy infrastructure as an issue of national security, he supports Fee and Dividend as a reliable means of reducing dependence on foreign oil.

Another bill partly inspired by the Fee and Dividend structure was introduced by Democratic Congressman John B. Larson on July 16, 2015. H.R. 3104, or the "America's Energy Security Trust Fund Act of 2015" includes a steadily rising price on carbon but uses some revenue for job retraining, and returns the remainder of revenue via a payroll tax cut rather than direct dividend payments.

On September 1, 2016, the California Assembly Joint Resolution 43, "Williams. Greenhouse gases: climate change", was filed, having passed both houses. The measure urges the United States Congress to enact a tax on carbon-based fossil fuels. The proposal is revenue-neutral, with all money collected going to the bottom 2/3 of American households. It may have difficulty passing in Congress because it would be considered a tax, but if households were to receive an equal share in the form of a dividend then the legislation should properly class as a carbon fee. Thus California's recommendation for national legislation is perhaps close to being acceptable to Congress.

A bipartisan carbon fee and dividend bill, the Energy Innovation and Carbon Dividend Act, was introduced into United States House of Representatives during the second session of the 115th Congress. After the bill died at the end of the session, it was reintroduced in the first session of the 116th Congress on January 24, 2019. The lead sponsor is Democrat Ted Deutch and it is cosponsored by Republican Francis Rooney. The bill would levy a $15 fee per ton of carbon dioxide equivalent which would increase by $10 each year, with all revenue being returned to households.

A similar bill, the Climate Action Rebate Act, was introduced on July 25, 2019, into the Senate by Democrats Chris Coons and Dianne Feinstein and into the House of Representatives by Democrat Jimmy Panetta. This bill's carbon fee would also start at $15 per ton of CO_{2}-equivalent, but it would increase by $15 each year. The revenue would be split between dividends, infrastructure, research and development, and transition assistance.

=== European Union ===
In the European Union a petition (addressed to the European Commission) was started on May 6, 2019, with the request to introduce a Climate Income in the EU. The petition is a registered European Citizens' Initiative, so if it reaches 1 million signatures, the topic will be placed on the agenda of the European Commission, and will be considered to form a legislative proposal.

=== Australia ===
An Australian version was proposed by Professors Richard Holden and Rosalind Dixon at the University of New South Wales (UNSW) and launched by Member for Wentworth Professor Kerryn Phelps AM MP. Surveys conducted by UNSW showed that the proposal would receive 73% support.

== Opposition ==
There are objections on the way the tax revenue is used. Emeritus professor of management Henry Jacoby, formerly of the Massachusetts Institute of Technology, reviewed some of the more common concerns in a Guardian article in January 2021, particularly the stigma of taxation's perceived unpopularity. Some opponents are concerned with governments possibly not returning the revenue to people. A 2021 study looking at the only two countries with implemented carbon dividends – Canada and Switzerland – found that the news of the funds raised being returned to the public had little impact on the carbon taxes unpopularity, and that among Canadian conservatives it may even have increased opposition.
