= Economists' Statement on Climate Change =

The Economists' Statement on Climate Change was published in 1997, prior to the Kyoto Protocol negotiated that same year, to promote market-based solutions to climate change. It was signed by more than 2,600 economists, including 19 Nobel Prize laureates, and remains the largest public statement in the history of the economics profession.

The statement was coordinated by Redefining Progress, an environmental economics think tank founded by Ted Halstead.

On a similar note, to show international leadership expected of one of the world’s wealthiest nations, it is in Australia’s economic interest to participate in the leading global effort to reduce emissions. A Statement by University Economists on Climate Change urge the Australian Government to ratify the Kyoto Protocol without further delay and to support this commitment with strong domestic measures aimed at cutting emissions. 272 economists affirm that global climate change presents serious environmental, economic, and social risks, warranting urgent and preventive action.

== Statement content ==
The statement published on 29 March 1997 read as follows:

I. The review conducted by a distinguished international panel of scientists under the auspices of the International Panel on Climate Change has determined that "the balance of evidence suggests a discernable human influence on global climate." As economists, we believe that global climate change carries with it significant environmental, economic, social, and geopolitical risks, and that preventive steps are justified.

II. Economic studies have found that there are many potential policies to reduce greenhouse-gas emissions for which the total benefits outweigh the total costs. For the United States in particular, sound economic analysis shows that there are policy options that would slow climate change without harming American living standards, and that these measures may in fact improve U.S. productivity in the long run.

III. The most efficient approach to slowing climate change is through market-based policies. In order for the world to achieve its climatic objectives at minimum cost, a cooperative approach among nations is required – such as an international emissions trading agreement. The United States and other nations can most efficiently implement their climate policies through market mechanisms, such as carbon taxes or the auction of emissions permits. The revenues generated from such policies can effectively be used to reduce the deficit or to lower existing taxes.

== Original drafters ==
- Kenneth Arrow
- Dale W. Jorgenson
- Paul Krugman
- William Nordhaus
- Robert Solow

== Nobel Laureate signatories ==
- Kenneth Arrow
- Gérard Debreu
- Lars Peter Hansen
- John Harsanyi
- Oliver Hart
- James Heckman
- Leonid Hurwicz
- Lawrence Klein
- Paul Krugman
- Wassily Leontief
- Franco Modigliani
- William Nordhaus
- Alvin E. Roth
- Thomas J. Sargent
- Amartya Sen
- Robert Solow
- Joseph Stiglitz
- James Tobin
- Oliver E. Williamson

== History and organization ==
The Economists' Statement on Climate Change was organized by Redefining Progress, an environmental economics think tank founded in 1993 by Ted Halstead, who served as its first executive director. Economist Stephen DeCanio, at the time a senior research fellow at Redefining Progress, played an important role in the effort.

Halstead and Decanio approached the original drafters listed above, and worked with them to co-draft the statement, which was subsequently mailed to other economists. The statement was released on March 29, 1997, in advance of the Kyoto Climate Change Conference of December 1997, which led to the Kyoto Protocol. Redefining Progress ceased operations in 2008.
