= Mike Moffatt =

Canadian economist (born 1977)

- Born: Michael Patrick Moffatt; March 14, 1977 (age 49); London, Ontario, Canada
- Spouse: Hannah Rasmussen

Academic background
- Education: Ivey Business School; University of Rochester; University of Western Ontario

Academic work
- Discipline: Industrial organization
- School or tradition: Neoclassical economics
- Institutions: Ivey Business School; Canada 2020

Michael Patrick Moffatt (born March 14, 1977) is a Canadian economist, Founding Director of the University of Ottawa's Missing Middle Initiative, and a professor of Business, Economics, and Public Policy at Ivey Business School. He has held a number of think-tank roles, including succeeding Diana Carney as Director of Policy and Research at Canada 2020, a progressive Canadian think-tank. Between 2013 and 2015 Mike served as an economic advisor to Liberal Party of Canada leader Justin Trudeau, and in 2017 he was named Chief Innovation Fellow for the Government of Canada.

Mike's family is from Whalen Corners in Lucan Biddulph, though Mike grew up in London, Ontario, where he attended elementary and highschool with fellow urbanist Jason Slaughter of Not Just Bikes.

== Education and career ==
Moffatt has a combined honours B.A. in economics and political science from the University of Western Ontario and a M.A. economics degree from the University of Rochester. He graduated from the Ph.D. program for business administration at the Richard Ivey School of Business in 2012. He is an assistant professor of business, economics and public policy at Ivey. In 2018, Moffatt was appointed director of policy and research at the progressive think-tank Canada 2020.

He was a "guide" for the Economics topic at About.com and provided weekly articles on economics topics, with a focus towards students. Moffatt is a business and economy consultant and appeared CBC Radio and the National Post. He also is an author for The Globe and Mail.
