= Es Capdellà =

Coordinates: 39°34′44.19″N 2°28′10.37″E

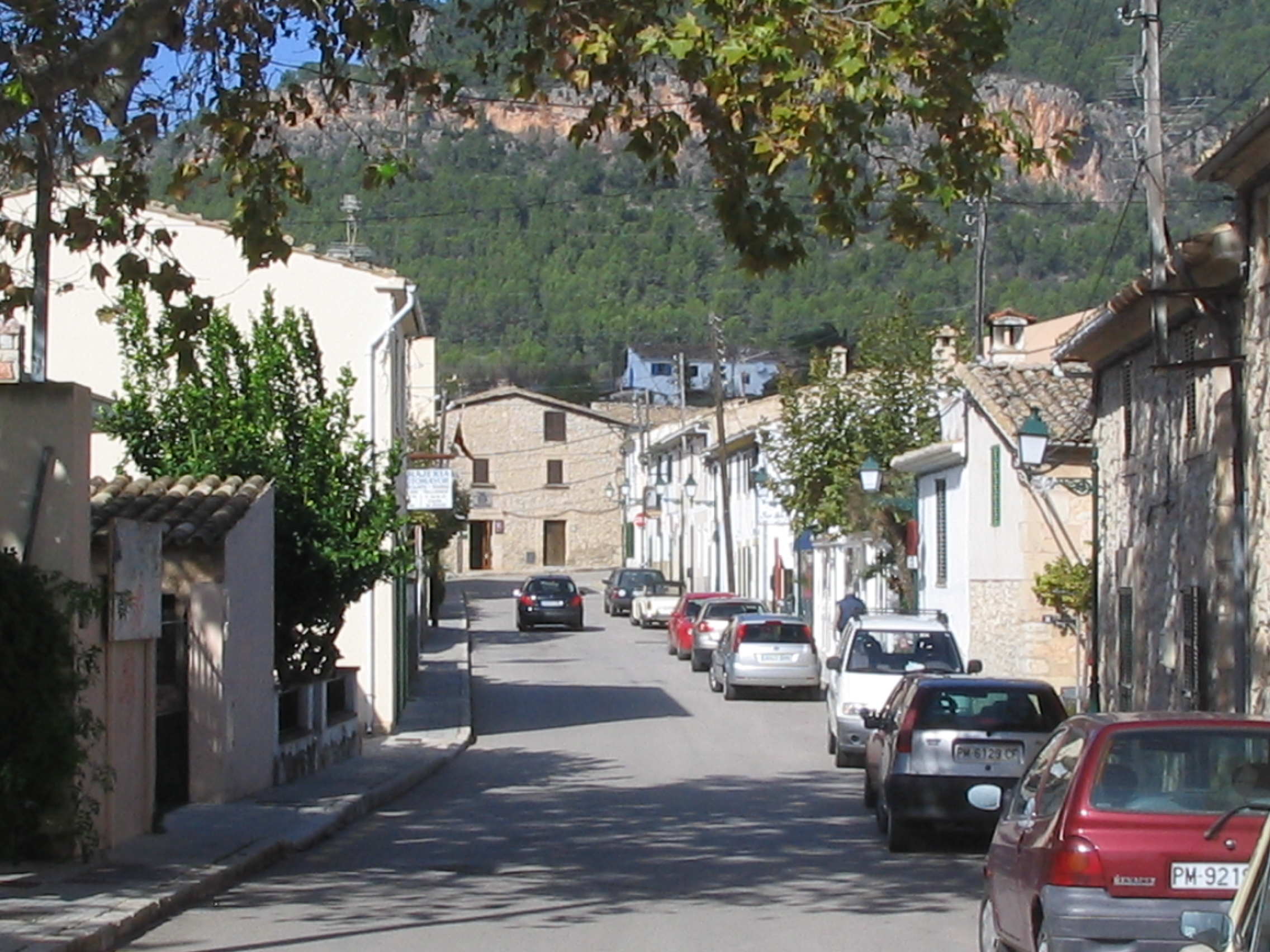
Street view of Es Capdellà.

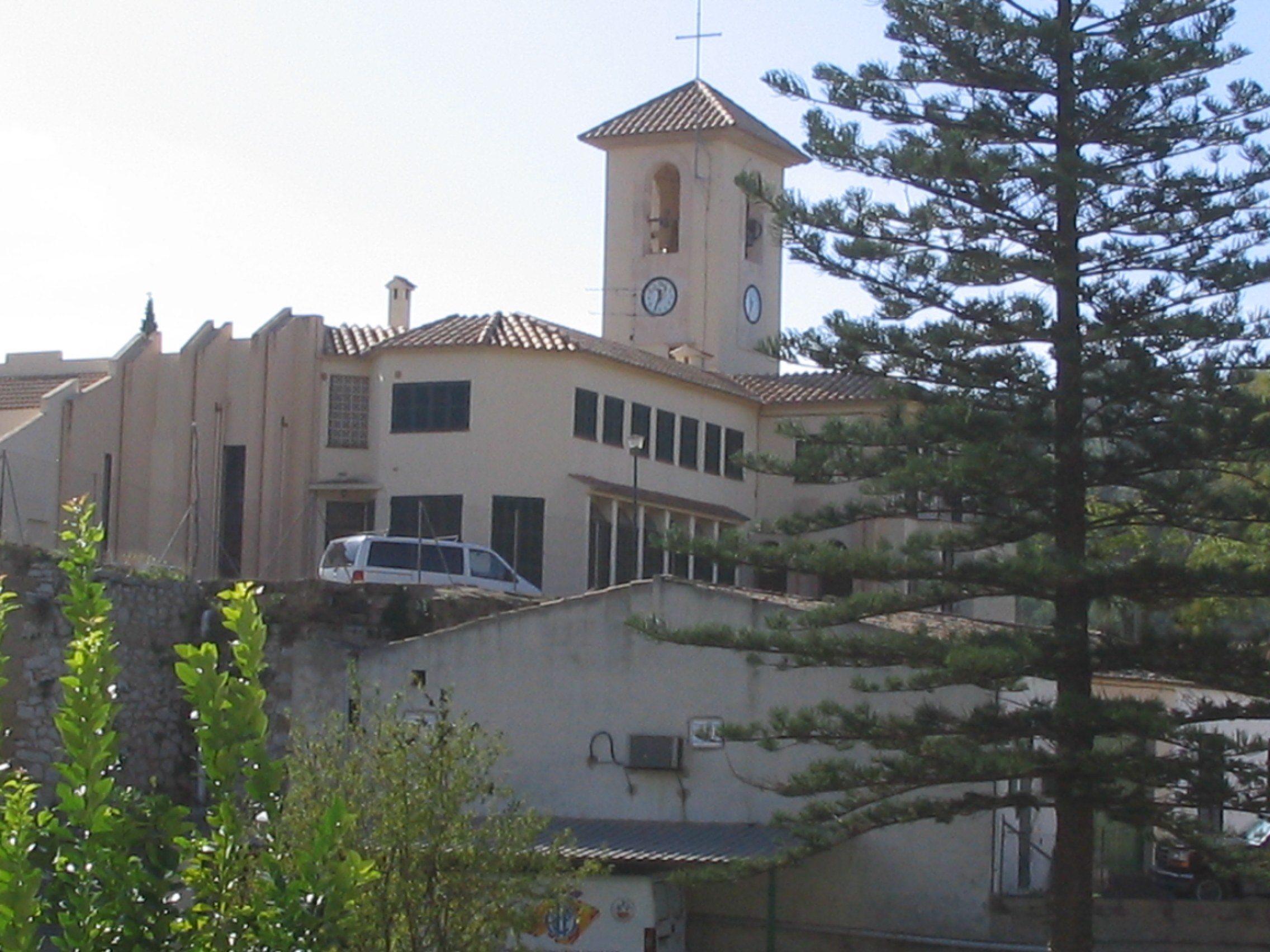
The parish church of Nuestra señora del Carmen in Es Capdellà.

Es Capdellà (translation from Catalan: "at the end of there") is a village in the municipality of Calvià on the island of Majorca, part of the Spanish autonomous community of the Balearic Islands. Situated on the hill known as the Puig de sa crane at 115 m (377 ft) above sea level, it has an area of 71.81 hectares. The closest neighboring villages are Galilee and Andratx.

Es Capdellà is a residential area of various nationalities (about 80 by the year 2009). It has a population of approximately 1,000 inhabitants.
