= Carbon tax =

Tax on carbon emissions

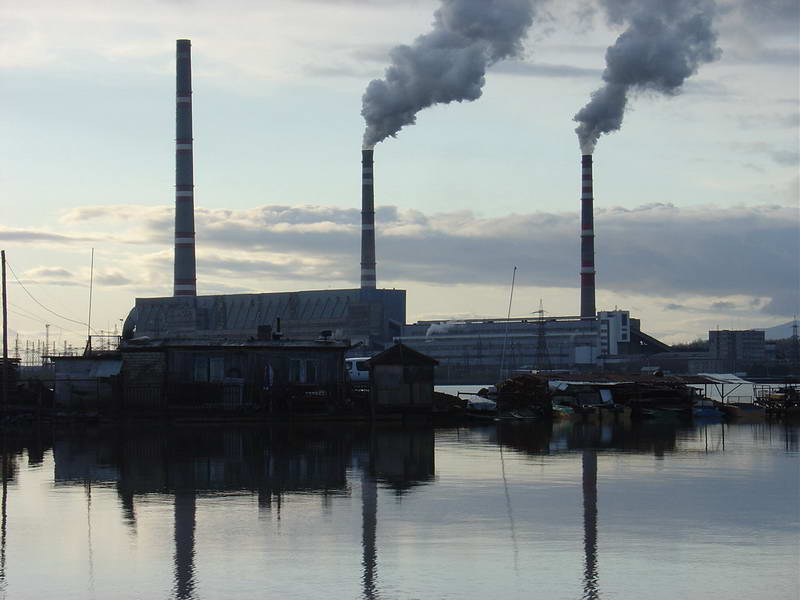
A carbon tax would add a fee for the carbon dioxide emitted from this coal-fired power plant in Luchegorsk, Russia.

A carbon tax is a tax levied on the carbon emissions from producing goods and services. Carbon taxes are intended to make visible the hidden social costs of carbon emissions. They are designed to reduce greenhouse gas emissions by essentially increasing the price of fossil fuels. This both decreases demand for goods and services that produce high emissions and incentivizes making them less carbon-intensive. When a fossil fuel such as coal, petroleum, or natural gas is burned, most or all of its carbon is converted to CO_{2}. Greenhouse gas emissions cause climate change. This negative externality can be reduced by taxing carbon content at any point in the product cycle.

A carbon tax as well as carbon emission trading is used within the carbon price concept. Two common economic alternatives to carbon taxes are tradable permits with carbon credits and subsidies. In its simplest form, a carbon tax covers only CO_{2} emissions. It could also cover other greenhouse gases, such as methane or nitrous oxide, by taxing such emissions based on their CO_{2}-equivalent global warming potential. Research shows that carbon taxes do often reduce emissions. Many economists argue that carbon taxes are the most efficient (lowest cost) way to tackle climate change. As of 2019, carbon taxes have either been implemented or are scheduled for implementation in 25 countries. 46 countries have put some form of price on carbon, either through carbon taxes or carbon emission trading schemes.

Some experts observe that a carbon tax can negatively affect public welfare, tending to hit low- and middle-income households the hardest and making their necessities more expensive (for instance, the tax might drive up prices for, say, petrol and electricity). Alternatively, the tax can be too conservative, making "comparatively small dents in overall emissions". To make carbon taxes fairer, policymakers can try to redistribute the revenue generated from carbon taxes to low-income groups by various fiscal means. Such a policy initiative becomes a carbon fee and dividend, rather than a plain tax.

== Purpose ==
Carbon dioxide is one of several heat-trapping greenhouse gases (others include methane and water vapor) emitted as a result of human activities. The scientific consensus is that human-induced greenhouse gas emissions are the primary cause of climate change, and that carbon dioxide is the most important of the anthropogenic greenhouse gases. Worldwide, 27 billion tonnes of carbon dioxide are produced by human activity annually. The physical effect of CO_{2} in the atmosphere can be measured as a change in the Earth-atmosphere system's energy balance – the radiative forcing of CO_{2}.

Different greenhouse gases have different physical properties: the global warming potential is an internationally accepted scale of equivalence for other greenhouse gases in units of tonnes of carbon dioxide equivalent. Carbon taxes are designed to reduce greenhouse gas emissions by increasing prices of the fossil fuels that emit them when burned. This both decreases demand for goods and services that produce high emissions and incentivizes making them less carbon-intensive.

== Economic theory ==
=== History and Rationale ===
A carbon tax is a form of pollution tax. David Gordon Wilson first proposed this type of tax in 1973. Unlike classic command and control regulations, which explicitly limit or prohibit emissions by each individual polluter, a carbon tax aims to allow market forces to determine the most efficient way to reduce pollution. A carbon tax is an indirect tax—a tax on a transaction—as opposed to a direct tax, which taxes income. Carbon taxes are price instruments since they set a price rather than an emission limit.

In addition to creating incentives for energy conservation, a carbon tax puts renewable energy such as wind, solar and geothermal on a more competitive footing. In economic theory, pollution is considered a negative externality, a negative effect on a third party not directly involved in a transaction, and is a type of market failure. To confront the issue, economist Arthur Pigou proposed taxing the goods (in this case hydrocarbon fuels), that were the source of the externality (CO_{2}) so as to accurately reflect the cost of the goods to society, thereby internalizing the production costs. A tax on a negative externality is called a Pigovian tax, which should equal the cost.

Within Pigou's framework, the changes involved are marginal, and the size of the externality is assumed to be small enough not to distort the economy. Climate change is claimed to result in catastrophe (non-marginal) changes. "Non-marginal" means that the impact could significantly reduce the growth rate in income and welfare. The amount of resources that should be devoted to climate change mitigation is controversial. Policies designed to reduce carbon emissions could have a non-marginal impact, but are asserted to not be catastrophic.

=== Design ===
The design of a carbon tax involves two primary factors: the level of the tax, and the use of the revenue. The former is based on the social cost of carbon (SCC), which attempts to calculate the numeric cost of the externalities of carbon pollution. The precise number is the subject of debate in environmental and policy circles. A higher SCC corresponds with a higher evaluation of the costs of carbon pollution on society. Stanford University scientists have estimated the social cost of carbon to be upwards of $200 per ton. More conservative estimates pin the cost at around $50.

The use of the revenue is another subject of debate in carbon tax proposals. A government may use revenue to increase its discretionary spending, or address deficits. However, such proposals often run the risk of being regressive, and sparking backlash among the public due to an increased cost of energy associated with such taxes. To avoid this and increase the popularity of a carbon tax, a government may make the carbon tax revenue-neutral. This can be done by reducing income tax proportionate to the level of the carbon tax, or by returning carbon tax revenues to citizens as a dividend.

=== Carbon leakage ===
Carbon leakage happens when the regulation of emissions in one country/sector pushes those emissions to other places with less regulation. Leakage effects can be both negative (i.e., increasing the effectiveness of reducing overall emissions) and positive (reducing the effectiveness of reducing overall emissions). Negative leakages, which are desirable, can be referred to as "spill-over".

According to one study, short-term leakage effects need to be judged against long-term effects. A policy that, for example, establishes carbon taxes only in developed countries might leak emissions to developing countries. However, a desirable negative leakage could occur due to reduced demand for coal, oil, and gas in developed countries, lowering prices. This could allow developing countries to replace coal with oil or gas, lowering emissions. In the long-run, however, if less polluting technologies are delayed, this substitution might have no long-term benefit. Carbon leakage is central to climate policy, given the 2030 Energy and Climate Framework and the review of the European Union's third carbon leakage list.

=== Carbon tariff ===
A carbon tariff or border carbon adjustment (BCA) is an eco-tariff on embedded carbon. The aim is generally to prevent carbon leakage from states without a carbon price. Examples of imports which are high-carbon and so may be subject to a carbon tariff are electricity generated by coal-fired power stations, iron and steel from blast furnaces, and fertilizer from the Haber process.

Currently, only California applies a BCA for electricity, while the European Union and the United Kingdom will apply BCAs from 2026 and 2027, respectively. Several other countries and territories with emissions pricing are considering them.

== Impacts ==
=== Positive impacts ===
Research shows that carbon taxes effectively reduce greenhouse gas emissions. Most economists assert that carbon taxes are the most efficient and effective way to curb climate change, with the least adverse economic effects. One study found that Sweden's carbon tax successfully reduced carbon dioxide emissions from transport by 11%. A 2015 British Columbia study found that the taxes reduced greenhouse gas emissions by 5–15% while having negligible overall economic effects. A 2017 British Columbia study found that industries on the whole benefited from the tax and "small but statistically significant 0.74 percent annual increases in employment" but that carbon-intensive and trade-sensitive industries were adversely affected. A 2020 study of carbon taxes in wealthy democracies showed that carbon taxes had not limited economic growth. Carbon taxes also appear to not adversely affect employment or GDP growth in Europe. Their economic impact ranges from zero to modest positive.

=== Negative impacts and trade-offs ===
A number of studies have found that in the absence of an increase in social benefits and tax credits, a carbon tax would hit poor households harder than rich households. Gilbert E. Metcalf disputed that carbon taxes would be regressive in the US. Carbon taxes can increase electricity prices. There is a debate about the relation between carbon pricing (like carbon emission trading and carbon tax) and climate justice. Carbon pricing can be adjusted to some principles of climate justice like polluters pay. Many proponents of climate justice object to carbon pricing. To close the gap between the two concepts, carbon pricing could put a cap on emissions, remove pollution from underserved communities, and justly divide revenues.

== Support and opposition ==
Since carbon taxation was first proposed, numerous economists have described its strengths as a means of reducing CO_{2} pollution. This tax has been praised as "a far better way to control pollution than the present method of specific regulation." It has also been lauded for its market based simplicity. This includes a description as "the most efficient way to guide the decisions of producers and consumers", since "carbon emissions have an 'unpriced' societal cost in terms of their deleterious effects on the earth's climate."

Since 2019 over 3,500 U.S. economists have signed The Economists' Statement on Carbon Dividends. This statement describes the benefits of a U.S. carbon tax along with suggestions for how it could be developed. One recommendation is to return revenues generated by a tax to the general public. The statement was originally signed by 45 Nobel Prize winning economists, former chairs of the Federal Reserve, former chairs of the Council of Economic Advisers, and former secretaries of the Treasury Department. It has been recognized as a historic example of consensus amongst economists. Ben Ho, professor of economics at Vassar College, has argued that "while carbon taxes are part of the optimal portfolio of policies to fight climate change, they are not the most important part."

Carbon taxes have been opposed by a substantial proportion of the public. They have also been rejected in several elections, and in some cases reversed as opposition increased. One response has been to specifically allocate carbon tax revenues back to the public in order to garner support. Citizens' Climate Lobby is an international organization with over 500 chapters. It advocates for carbon tax legislation in the form of a progressive fee and dividend structure. NASA climatologist James E. Hansen has also spoken in favor of a revenue neutral carbon fee.

=== Public perception ===
In some instances knowledge about how carbon tax revenues are used can affect public support. Dedicating revenues to climate projects and compensating low income housing have been found to be popular uses of revenue. However, providing information about specific revenue uses in countries that have implemented carbon taxes has been shown to have limited effectiveness in increasing public support. A 2021 poll conducted by GlobeScan on 31 countries and territories found that 62 percent on average are supportive of a carbon tax, while only 33 percent are opposed to a carbon tax. In 28 of the 31 countries and territories listed in the poll, a majority of their populations are supportive of a carbon tax.

== Alternatives ==
=== Carbon emission trading ===
Carbon emission trading (also called cap and trade) is another approach. Emission levels are limited and emission permits traded among emitters. The permits can be issued via government auctions or offered without charge based on existing emissions (grandfathering). Auctions raise revenues that can be used to reduce other taxes or to fund government programs. Variations include setting price-floor and/or price-ceiling for permits. A carbon tax can be combined with trading. A cap with grandfathered permits can have an efficiency advantage since it applies to all industries. Cap and trade provides an equal incentive for all producers at the margin to reduce their emissions. This is an advantage over a tax that exempts or has reduced rates for certain sectors.

Both carbon taxes and trading systems aim to reduce emissions by creating a price for emitting CO_{2}. In the absence of uncertainty both systems will result in the efficient market quantity and price of CO_{2}. When the environmental damage and therefore the appropriate tax of each unit of CO_{2} cannot be accurately calculated, a permit system may be more advantageous. In the case of uncertainty regarding the costs of CO_{2} abatement for firms, a tax is preferable. Permit systems regulate total emissions. In practice the limit has often been set so high that permit prices are not significant. In the first phase of the European Union Emissions Trading System, firms reduced their emissions to their allotted quantity without the purchase of any additional permits. This drove permit prices to nearly zero two years later, crashing the system and requiring reforms that would eventually appear in EUETS Phase 3.

The distinction between carbon taxes and permit systems can get blurred when hybrid systems are allowed. A hybrid sets limits on price movements, potentially softening the cap. When the price gets too high, the issuing authority issues additional permits at that price. A price floor may be breached when emissions are so low that no one needs to buy a permit. Economist Gilbert Metcalf has proposed such a system, the Emissions Assurance Mechanism, and the idea, in principle, has been adopted by the Climate Leadership Council. James E. Hansen argued in 2009 that emissions trading would only make money for banks and hedge funds and allow business-as-usual for the chief carbon-emitting industries.

==== Carbon offsets and credits ====
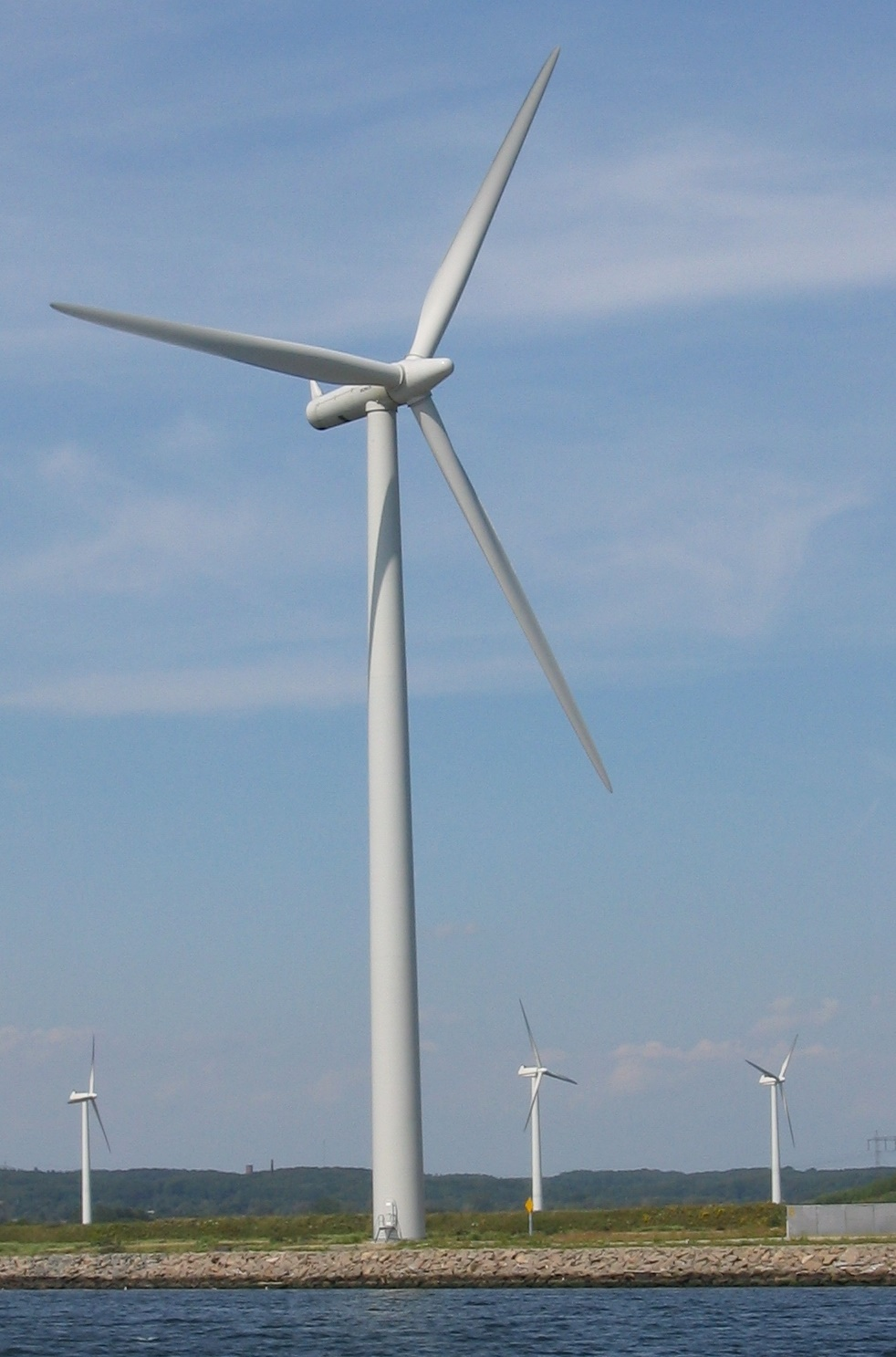
Renewable energy projects, such as these wind turbines near Aalborg, Denmark, constitute one common type of carbon offset project.

A carbon credit is a tradable instrument (typically a virtual certificate) that conveys a claim to have avoided greenhouse gas (GHG) emissions or to have enhanced removal of GHG from the atmosphere. One carbon credit represents the avoided or enhanced removal of one metric ton of carbon dioxide or its carbon dioxide-equivalent (CO_{2}e).

Carbon offsetting is the practice of using carbon credits to offset or counter an entity's greenhouse gas inventory emissions in line with reporting programs or institutional emissions targets/goals. Carbon credit trading mechanisms (i.e., crediting programs), enable project developers to implement projects that mitigate GHGs and receive carbon credits which can be sold to interested buyers who may use the credits to claim they have offset their inventory GHG emissions. Similar to "offsetting", carbon credits that are permitted as compliance instruments within regulatory compliance markets (e.g., The European Union Emission Trading Scheme or the California Cap-n-Trade program) can be used by regulated entities to report lower emissions and achieve compliance status (with limitations around their use that vary by compliance program). Aside from "offsetting", carbon credits can also be used to make contributions toward global net zero GHG-level targets. It is an individual buyer's choice how to use, or "retire", the carbon credit.

=== Other types of taxes ===
Two related taxes are emissions taxes and energy taxes. An emissions tax on greenhouse gas emissions requires individual emitters to pay a fee, charge, or tax for every tonne of greenhouse gas, while an energy tax is applied to the fuels themselves. In terms of climate change mitigation, a carbon tax is not a perfect substitute for an emissions tax. For example, a carbon tax encourages reduced fuel use, but it does not encourage emissions reduction such as carbon capture and storage. Energy taxes increase the price of energy regardless of emissions.

An ad valorem energy tax is levied according to the energy content of a fuel or the value of an energy product, which may or may not be consistent with the emitted greenhouse gas amounts and their respective global warming potentials. Studies indicate that to reduce emissions by a certain amount, ad valorem energy taxes would be more costly than carbon taxes. However, although greenhouse gas emissions are an externality, using energy services may result in other negative externalities, e.g., air pollution not covered by the carbon tax (such as ammonia or fine particles). A combined carbon-energy tax may therefore be better at reducing air pollution than a carbon tax alone.

Any of these taxes can be combined with a rebate, where the money collected by the tax is returned to qualifying parties, taxing heavy emitters and subsidizing those that emit less carbon. Because carbon taxes only target carbon dioxide, they do not target other greenhouse gasses, such as methane, which have a greater warming potential.

=== Petroleum (gasoline, diesel, jet fuel) taxes ===
Many countries tax fuel directly; for example, the UK imposes a hydrocarbon oil duty directly on vehicle hydrocarbon oils, including petrol and diesel fuel. While a direct tax sends a clear signal to the consumer, its efficiency at influencing consumers' fuel use has been challenged for reasons including:

- Possible delays of a decade or more as inefficient vehicles are replaced by newer models and the older models filter through the fleet.
- Political pressures that deter policymakers from increasing taxes.
- Limited relationship between consumer decisions on fuel economy and fuel prices. Other efforts, such as fuel efficiency standards, or changing income tax rules on taxable benefits, may be more effective.
- The historical use of fuel taxes as a source of general revenue, given fuel's low price elasticity, which allows higher rates without reducing fuel volumes. In these circumstances, the policy rational may be unclear.

Vehicle fuel taxes may reduce the "rebound effect" that occurs when vehicle efficiency improves. Consumers may make additional journeys or purchase heavier and more powerful vehicles, offsetting the efficiency gains.

=== Comparison of alternatives ===
A 2018 survey of leading economists found that 58% of the surveyed economists agreed with the assertion, "Carbon taxes are a better way to implement climate policy than cap-and-trade," 31% stated that they had no opinion or that it was uncertain, but none of the respondents disagreed.

In a review study in 1996 the authors concluded that the choice between an international quota (cap) system, or an international carbon tax, remained ambiguous. Another study in 2012 compared a carbon tax, emissions trading, and command-and-control regulation at the industry level, concluding that market-based mechanisms would perform better than emission standards in achieving emission targets without affecting industrial production.

== Implementation ==
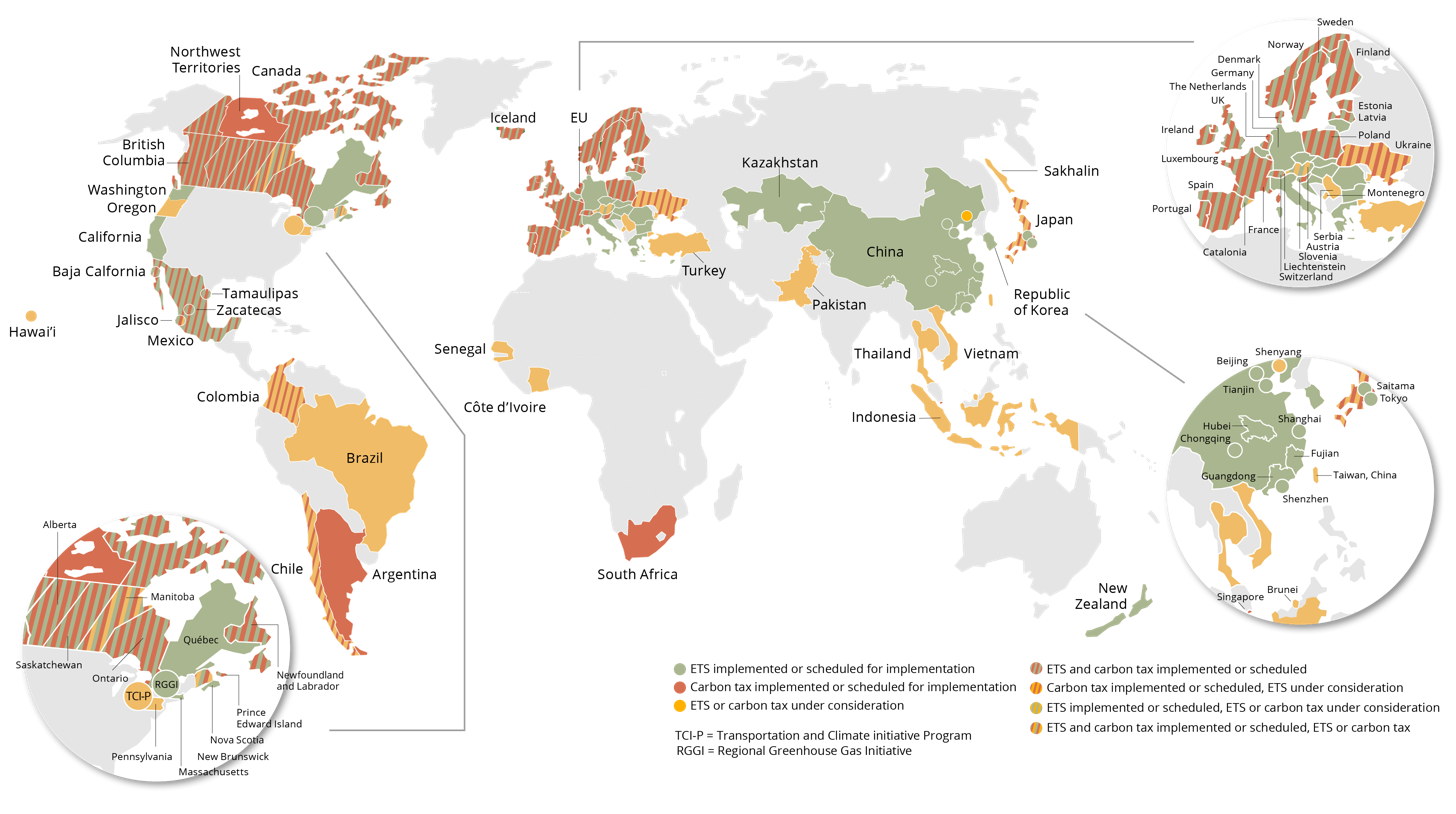
Emissions trading and carbon taxes around the world (as of 2021) Carbon tax implemented or scheduled Carbon emission trading implemented or scheduled Carbon emission trading or carbon tax under consideration

Both energy and carbon taxes have been implemented in response to commitments under the United Nations Framework Convention on Climate Change. In most cases the tax is implemented in combination with exemptions. Indirect carbon prices, such as fuel taxes, are much more common than carbon taxes. In 2021, OECD reported that 67 of the 71 countries it assessed had some form of fuel tax. Only 39 had carbon taxes or ETSs. However, the use of carbon taxes is growing more quickly. In addition, several countries plan to further strengthen existing carbon taxes in the coming years, including Singapore, Canada and South Africa.

Current carbon price policies, including carbon taxes, are still considered insufficient to create the kinds of changes in emissions that would be consistent with Paris Agreement goals. The International Monetary Fund, OECD, and others have stated that current fossil fuel prices generally fail to reflect environmental impacts.

=== Europe ===
In Europe, many countries have imposed energy taxes or energy taxes based partly on carbon content. These include Denmark, Finland, Germany, Ireland, Italy, the Netherlands, Norway, Slovenia, Sweden, Switzerland, and the UK. None of these countries have been able to introduce a uniform carbon tax for fuels in all sectors. Denmark is the first country to include livestock emissions in their carbon tax system.

During the 1990s, a carbon/energy tax was proposed at the EU level but failed due to industrial lobbying. In 2010, the European Commission considered implementing a pan-European minimum tax on pollution permits purchased under the European Union Greenhouse Gas Emissions Trading Scheme (EU ETS) in which the proposed new tax would be calculated in terms of carbon content. The suggested rate of €4 to €30 per tonne of CO_{2}.

=== Americas ===
==== Costa Rica ====
In 1997, Costa Rica imposed a 3.5 percent carbon tax on hydrocarbon fuels. A portion of the proceeds go to the "Payment for Environmental Services" (PSA) program which gives incentives to property owners to practice sustainable development and forest conservation. Approximately 11% of Costa Rica's national territory is protected by the plan. The program now pays out roughly $15 million a year to around 8,000 property owners.

==== Canada ====
In the 2008 Canadian federal election, a carbon tax proposed by Liberal Party leader Stéphane Dion, known as the Green Shift, became a central issue. It would have been revenue-neutral, balancing increased taxation on carbon with rebates. However, it proved to be unpopular and contributed to the Liberal Party's defeat, earning the lowest vote share since Confederation. The Conservative party won the election by promising to "develop and implement a North American-wide cap-and-trade system for greenhouse gases and air pollution, with implementation to occur between 2012 and 2015".

In 2018, Canada enacted a revenue-neutral carbon levy starting in 2019, fulfilling Prime Minister Justin Trudeau's campaign pledge. The Greenhouse Gas Pollution Pricing Act applies only to provinces without provincial adequate carbon pricing. As of September 2020, seven of thirteen Canadian provinces and territories use the federal carbon tax while three have developed their own carbon tax programs. In December 2020, the federal government released an updated plan with a CA$15 per tonne per year increase in the carbon pricing, reaching CA$95 per tonne in 2025 and CA$170 per tonne in 2030. Quebec became the first province to introduce a carbon tax. The tax was to be imposed on energy producers starting 1 October 2007, with revenue collected used for energy-efficiency programs. The tax rate for gasoline is $CDN0.008 per liter, or about CA$3.50 per tonne of CO_{2} equivalent.

The Liberal government claimed 80% of Canadians were receiving more money back via a carbon rebate but the tax was unpopular with many Canadians and became a political issue. In 2023, the Official Opposition refused to support a free trade bill between Canada and the Ukraine that added a new environmental chapter to "promote carbon pricing". Liberal Trade Minister Mary Ng stated, "We should applaud the Ukrainians for being able to negotiate an agreement and also fight climate change." Liberal House leader Karina Gould, argued the Tories were "abandoning Ukraine and not taking climate change seriously", and accused them of "American-style, right-wing politics". Pierre Poilievre, the leader of the Opposition, called the carbon tax stipulation "cruel" and stated, "It is disgusting, that Trudeau’s ideological obsession with taxing working-class people, seniors and suffering families has come ahead of what should have been a free trade agreement."

By the end of 2024, opinion polls showed the ruling Trudeau Liberals were 20 points behind the Conservative Party of Canada, which was using the slogan "Axe the Tax" in their platform. Many Liberals, worried about projected losses in the 2025 federal election, pushed for Justin Trudeau to resign, which he eventually announced on January 6, 2025. The party former Governor of the Bank of Canada, Mark Carney, and within a few hours of being sworn in as Canada's 24th prime minister on March 14, 2025, Carney signed a declaration ending the consumer carbon tax and the rebate. Carney stated in his platform that "further measures to make up for the lost impact of the consumer carbon tax" would be implemented. Alberta Premier Danielle Smith warned of forthcoming increased industrial carbon taxes, which would be passed onto consumers without a rebate program in effect.

==== United States ====
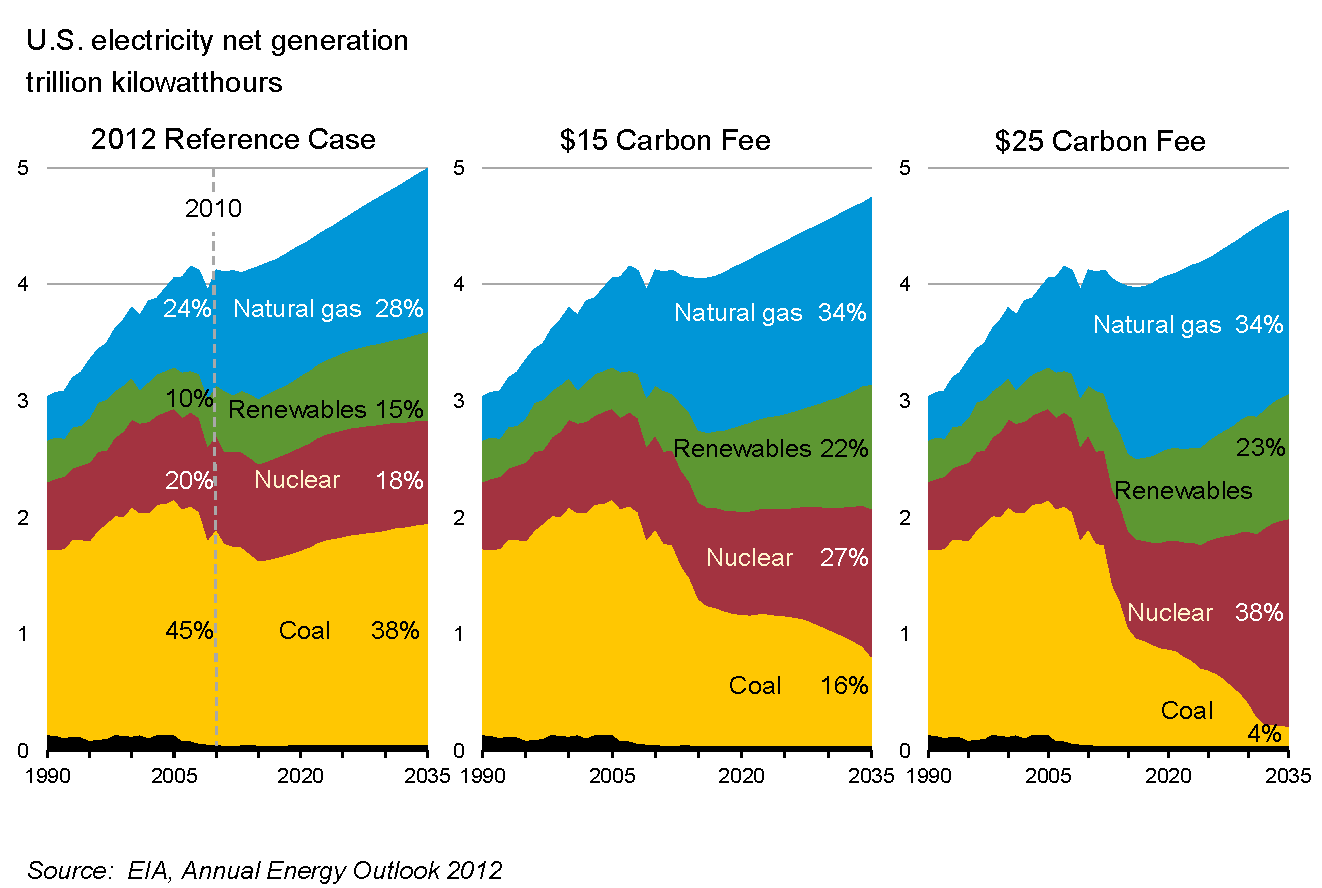
Estimated effect of a carbon tax on sources of United States electrical generation (as of 2012)

A national carbon tax in the U.S. has been repeatedly proposed, but never enacted. For instance, on 23 July 2018, Representative Carlos Curbelo (R-FL) introduced H.R. 6463, the "Market Choice Act", a proposal for a carbon tax in which revenue is used to bolster American infrastructure and environmental solutions. The bill was introduced in the House of Representatives, but did not become law.

A number of organizations are currently advancing national carbon tax proposals. To address concerns from conservatives that a carbon tax would grow government and increase cost of living, recent proposals have centered around revenue-neutrality. The Citizens' Climate Lobby (CCL), republicEn (formerly E&EI), the Climate Leadership Council (CLC), and Americans for Carbon Dividends (AFCD) support a revenue-neutral carbon tax with a border adjustment. The latter two organizations advocate for a specific framework called the Baker-Shultz Carbon Dividends Plan, which has gained national bipartisan traction since its announcement in 2017. The central principle is a gradually rising carbon tax in which all revenues are rebated as equal dividends to the American people. This plan is co-authored by and named after Republican elder-statesmen James Baker and George Shultz. It is also supported by companies including Microsoft, Pepsico, First Solar, American Wind Energy Association, Exxon Mobil, BP, and General Motors.

== See also ==
- Congestion pricing
- Fossil fuel subsidies
- Meat tax
- Polluter pays principle
