= Climate Leadership Council =

US climate change organization

- Established: 2017
- Type: NGO
- Legal status: 501(c)(3)
- Purpose: Climate Policy
- Headquarters: Washington, D.C.
- Key people: Greg Bertelsen (CEO)
- Website: www.clcouncil.org

The Climate Leadership Council (the Council) is a bipartisan non-profit organization that advocates for market-based solutions to reduce global emissions. In 2022, it launched the Center for Climate & Trade which leverages "trade relationships and the market economy towards greater international cooperation and climate progress."

Launched in 2017 by Ted Halstead and former Republican Secretaries of State James Baker and George Shultz, the Council organized a coalition of companies, environmental organizations, economists and others in support of its original climate proposal, the Baker-Shultz Carbon Dividends plan.

== Focus areas and recent work ==
In recent years, the Council has focused on "leveraging market forces to incentivize clean technology investments, innovation, and lower emissions." In support of this mission, the Council's work spans several focus areas.

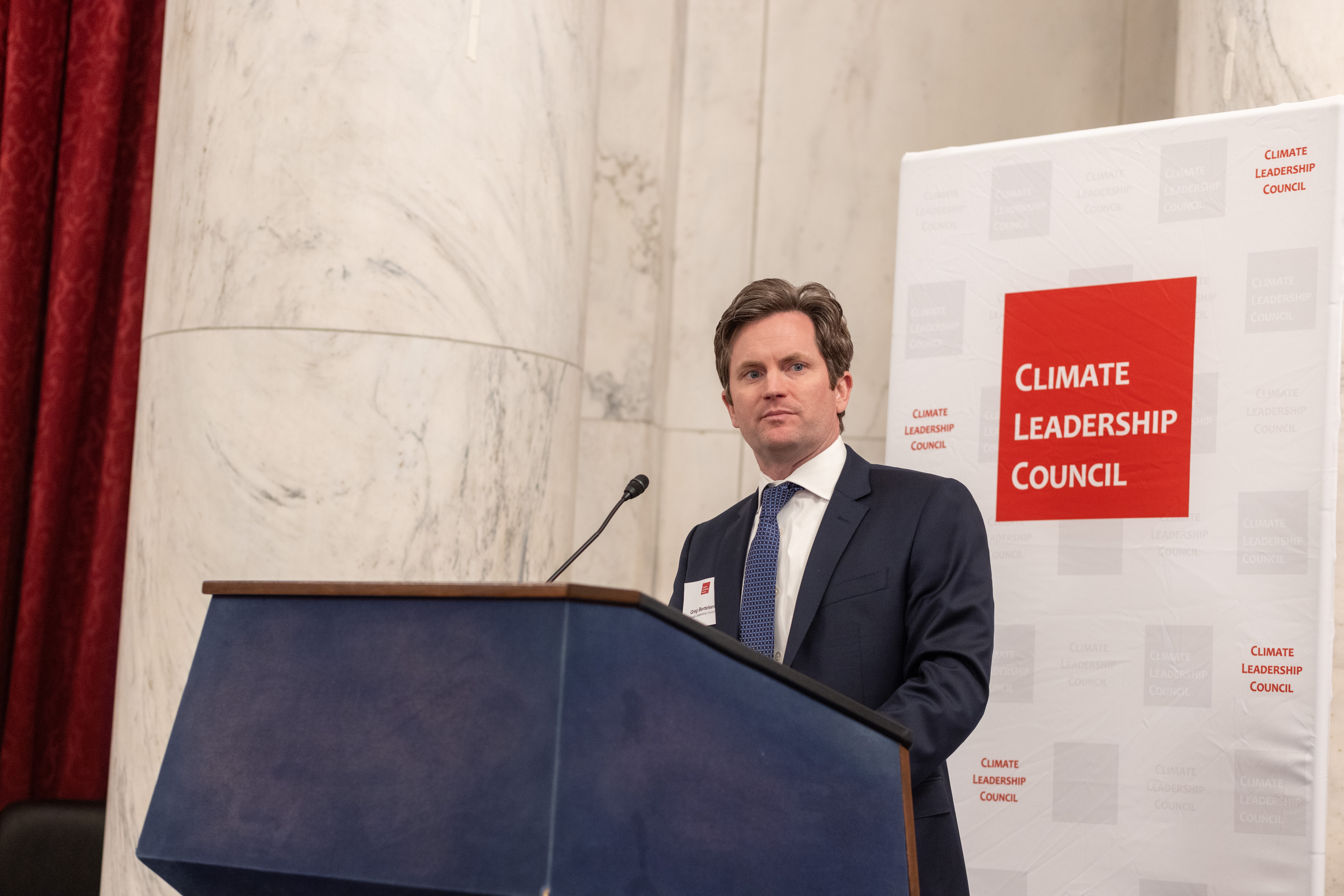
Council CEO Greg Bertelsen speaks at a Council event ahead of Senator Bill Cassidy’s (R-LA) introduction of the Foreign Pollution Fee Act of 2025.

Trade: The Council works to align trade policy with climate goals by promoting standards that reward low-carbon production. A quarter of global emissions are tied to internationally traded goods. In 2022, the Council launched the Center for Climate & Trade, an initiative that focuses on leveraging trade as a tool for advancing global climate progress.

Carbon Advantage: The Council supports strategies that leverage the U.S. carbon advantage to lower global emissions and boost the U.S. manufacturing sector. The Council published America’s Carbon Advantage in 2020, followed by an update in 2025, which found “goods manufactured in the U.S. are more than 2x more carbon-efficient than the world average.”

International Investments & Exports: The Council works to align U.S. investment and export policy with economic, security, and climate goals. They state that “there is an estimated $130 trillion in global market potential for clean energy technologies through 2050, though the U.S. accounts for just 6% of global exports in those technologies today.”

Supply Chain Security: The Council supports strategies to strengthen and diversify supply chains for the critical minerals that are essential to producing advanced energy technologies. According to the Council’s report Prioritizing American Interests: A New Strategy for Global Decarbonization, the United States is over 50% import-dependent for 50 categories of critical minerals and fully reliant on imports for 14 categories, posing risks to both economic competitiveness and decarbonization efforts.

Measuring Emissions: The Council promotes the harmonization of methods for measuring emissions across industries and international borders. The Council supports efforts to produce more transparent and accurate carbon accounting in the U.S., including the emissions data that would be authorized under the PROVE IT Act.

Carbon Dividends: The Council’s Carbon Dividends Plan is designed to support gradual decarbonization, provide policy certainty for U.S. businesses, and promote international accountability. In 2020, the Council released the Bipartisan Climate Roadmap, based on the four-part Baker Shultz Carbon Dividends Plan.

== Center for Climate & Trade ==
In 2022, the Climate Leadership Council launched the Center for Climate & Trade (the Center), an initiative focused on “exploring policies that leverage international trade to support global decarbonization.” It’s been reported that a quarter of global greenhouse gas emissions are embedded in internationally traded goods, Further, meeting global net-zero goals will require $215 trillion in investments. The Center seeks to address these challenges by developing policy solutions, publishing research, convening experts, and educating policymakers on real-world impacts of trade and investment on climate. It is co-chaired by Charlene Barshefsky, James L. Connaughton, and Jennifer Hillman.

== Baker-Shultz Carbon Dividends Plan ==
The Council’s carbon tax and dividend proposal, known as the Baker-Shultz Carbon Dividends Plan, would place a fee on fossil fuel companies based on their carbon emissions and return the revenue to Americans through quarterly payments. The plan is built on four pillars: charging fossil fuel companies a carbon fee; returning all revenue to the American people as dividends; phasing out carbon regulations that are no longer necessary; and applying a border carbon adjustment on imports from countries without similar emissions policies.

In 2019, the Council organized the Economists' Statement on Carbon Dividends, signed by over 3,500 U.S. economists. In 2020, it released the Bipartisan Climate Roadmap outlining the plan’s details, including a starting carbon fee of $40 per ton and dividend payments beginning at $2,000 per year for a family of four. The Council also convened a coalition of business, environmental, and financial leaders to promote the plan to the Senate Climate Solutions Caucus.

== Benefits of carbon dividends ==
In addition to lowering CO_{2} emissions, research and modeling has shown that the plan would also generate $1.4 trillion in new capital investment in innovation and create 1.6 million new jobs by 2035 in clean-energy technologies like electric vehicles, solar panels, carbon capture technologies, and offshore wind farms.

A report, America’s Carbon Advantage, published in 2020 argues that the U.S. economy would emerge as a global winner from a border adjustable carbon fee included in the council's plan in part because American-manufactured goods are 40 percent more carbon efficient than the world average. Overseas manufacturers looking to export their goods to the U.S. would pay a U.S. carbon import fee. As a result, American businesses that are more efficient stand to benefit.

The council also published a study by NERA Economic Consulting in 2020 asserting that a carbon dividends model would generate more economic output compared with using commonly proposed climate regulations to achieve the same emissions reductions. By 2036, U.S. annual gross domestic product (GDP) would be $190 billion higher annually under a carbon dividends model compared with similar carbon reductions that rely on regulations.

== Polling ==
The council has published numerous polls showing bipartisan support for action to address climate change and for a carbon dividends solution.

== Founding members ==
The Climate Leadership Council's coalition of supporters are called Founding Members. The council launched its Founding Members coalition in June 2017. As of August 2021, the council had 46 Founding Members, including 25 corporations, three environmental organizations and 17 individuals.

On August 6, 2021, Exxon Mobil Corporation's membership in the Climate Leadership Council was suspended.
