= Environmental profit and loss account =

Monetary evaluation account

An environmental profit and loss account (E P&L) is a company's monetary valuation and analysis of its environmental impacts including its business operations and its supply chain from cradle-to-gate. An E P&L internalizes externalities and monetizes the cost of business to nature by accounting for the ecosystem services a business depends on to operate in addition to the cost of direct and indirect negative impacts on the environment. The primary purpose of an E P&L is to allow managers and stakeholders to see the magnitude of these impacts and where in the supply chain they occur.

The E P&L analysis provides a metric to measure and monitor the footprint of the company's operations and suppliers all the way to the initial raw materials. It is a tool to build awareness of the importance of nature to the sustainability of businesses; enhance visibility across a company's supply chain and deepen understanding to focus sustainability efforts and implement better-informed operational decisions; improve specificity for risk management regarding environmental dependencies and impacts; and support a more holistic view of a company's performance, while bringing clarity and transparency to stakeholders at all levels and identifying new opportunities to enhance the sustainability of a company's products.

== Background ==
Conceived by Puma Chairman, Jochen Zeitz, and launched by Puma and its parent company's sustainability initiative (PPR HOME), the first-ever E P&L was conducted on 2010 data and released in two phases. In May 2011 the valuation of Puma's 2010 Greenhouse Gas Emissions (GHG) and water usage was announced, followed in November 2011, by Puma's overall E P&L, which also included valuation results for other forms of air pollution, land conversion and waste.

Simultaneously, the PPR Group announced in November 2011 that a Group E P&L would be implemented across its Luxury and Sport & Lifestyle brands by 2015.

== Methodology ==
The E P&L and the associated methodology were developed with the support of PricewaterhouseCoopers and Trucost. The E P&L used existing input-output models and developed new valuation methodologies, building on a large volume of work in the fields of environmental and natural resource economics such as the United Nations study on The Economics of Ecosystems and Biodiversity.

Kering, the parent company for Puma, has released its Environmental Profit and Loss Accounting methodology in an open source mode. Novo Nordisk is another company that has released its environmental profit and loss account and methodology report. The 2017 annual report of Philips mentioned that the company had an environmental impact of Euro 7.2 billion for that year. This assessment was made through an Environmental Profit and Loss Accounting process. The company mentioned that this monetary value has not considered various practices that has environmental impacts.

== Engagement ==
The UK government used the Puma E P&L as a case study for sustainable business in the Department for Environment, Food and Rural Affairs Natural Environment White Paper in June 2011. In July 2011, Pavan Sukhdev who was the Study Leader of TEEB and the Special Advisor and Head of UNEP's Green Economy Initiative, referred to the Puma E P&L in his TED presentation. Sustainability authority, John Elkington includes the Puma E P&L in his "The Future Quotient: 50 Stars in Seriously Long-Term Innovation". In the October issue of The Harvard Business Review the Puma E P&L is included in "The Sustainable Economy" by Yvon Chouinard, Jib Ellison, and Rick Ridgeway. In the Winter 2012 issue, the Stanford Social Innovation Review published "Connecting Heart to Head" by Ram Nidumolu, Kevin Kramer, & Jochen Zeitz. The Puma E P&L is included as a business case study. In December 2011, Jochen Zeitz spoke at His Royal Highness The Prince of Wales' Accounting For Sustainability Forum about the Puma E P &L.

Puma's EP&L accounting process has influenced other companies attempting natural capital accounting. A smartphone app has been made available, free of cost, to help students of design and fashion, to understand the environmental impacts.

== Critique ==
An assessment report indicated that preparing an EP&L report can be expensive, while benefits being derived from the process is substantial. EP&L Accounting has also been considered as a first step in the process of ensuring that prices reflect the use of environmental goods and services.

== See also ==
- Environmental full-cost accounting
