= Duisenberg School of Finance =

Educational school now part of University of Amsterdam

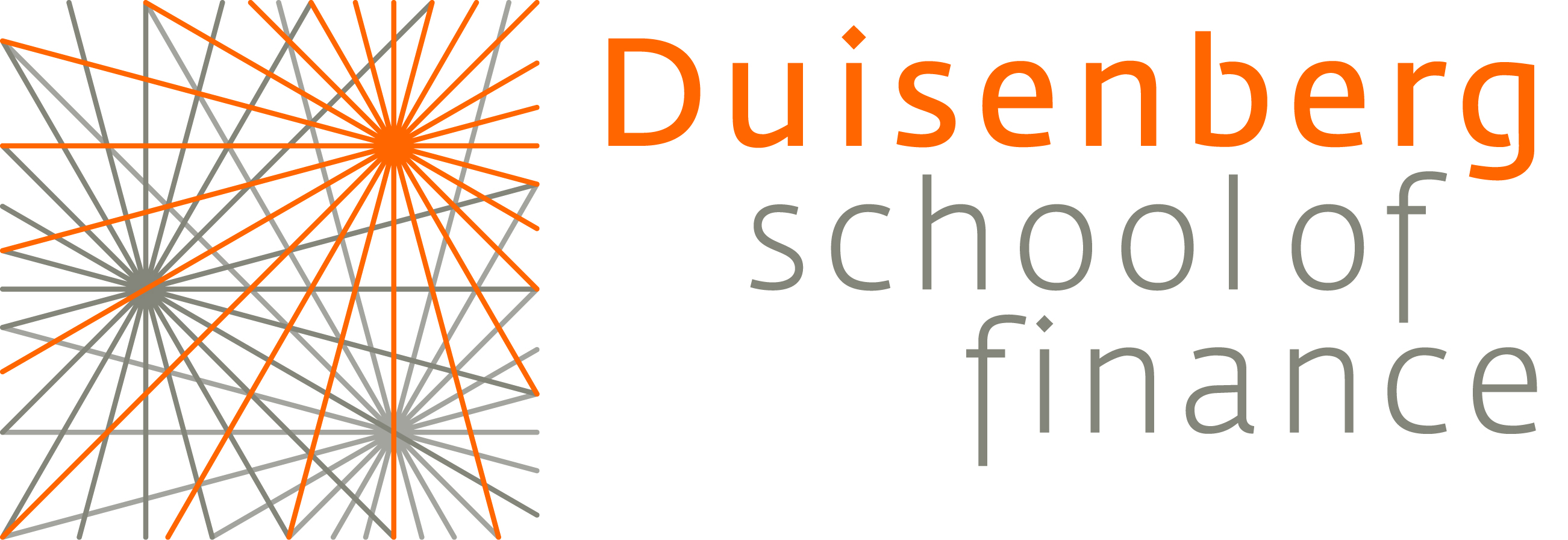
- Motto: Duces autem in rebus oeconomicis (Latin)
- Motto in English: "For leaders in finance"
- Type: Private
- Active: 2008–2015
- Parent institution: University of Amsterdam; Vrije Universiteit
- Dean: Dr. Dirk Schoenmaker
- Faculty: 18
- Administrative staff: 15
- Location: Gustav Mahlerplein 117, 1082 MS, Amsterdam, North Holland, Netherlands
- Campus: Urban
- Language: English
- Colours: Orange
- Website: www.dsf.nl

The Duisenberg School of Finance (DSF) was an educational university in the Netherlands. It offered Master's level education in finance between 2008 and 2015. The school was launched as a collaboration between the Dutch financial sector and various academic institutions. DSF's founders include influential Dutch economist Nout Wellink and Minister of Economic Affairs, Maria van der Hoeven. The name was chosen by the founders to honor Wim Duisenberg, the first President of the European Central Bank.

In its first academic year, the school enrolled approximately one hundred students. The school had an administrative staff of eighteen faculty members supported by a number of partnering institutions, including the Dutch Central Bank, ING and APG. The university and its campus were located in the Symphony offices in the Amsterdam financial district of Zuidas. The board of directors and the executive fellowship at DSF included senior members of large financial institutions in the Netherlands.

In 2015, the Dutch Center for Higher Education Information (Dutch: Centrum Hoger Onderwijs Informatie) ranked the LLM Finance and Law programme as the highest ranking professional program in the Netherlands.

In fall of 2015, Duisenberg School of Finance was integrated into the programs of the Vrije Universiteit and University of Amsterdam. The program was renamed the Duisenberg Honors Program at VU and UVA.

== Program ==
The school offered a Masters of Science in four major tracks. The most intensive track was an LLM program in Finance, the other tracks being Risk Management, Financial Markets & Regulation, and Corporate Finance & Banking. Both the MS and LLM programmes of DSF were accredited by the NVAO (Accreditation Organisation of the Netherlands and Flanders).

== Background ==
DSF and industry partners. ING director Nick Jue and dean Dirk Schoenmaker

DSF was founded as a collaborative effort of academic researchers, financial companies, legal firms and government organizations on September 7, 2008. The launch followed an agreement to finance the school operations signed by various Dutch financial service providers. The executive management and associated fellowship of DSF were composed of representatives from businesses, government, academia, and legal firms.

=== Academic profile ===
Courses were typically taught by visiting faculty members. Academics from the University of Amsterdam (UvA) and Vrije Universiteit (VU) often collaborated on various research projects with members of involved financial companies. Occasionally, lectures were taught by executive management of partnering financial institutions.

DSF Policy Briefs were designed together with regulators, members of the financial sector, and policymakers. Articles and research papers that met the school research criteria were published in the public domain. Students and faculty mainly worked on research papers aimed at assessing the regulation and efficiency of the financial sector. The Tinbergen Institute also worked together with DSF on research projects.

=== Notable faculty ===
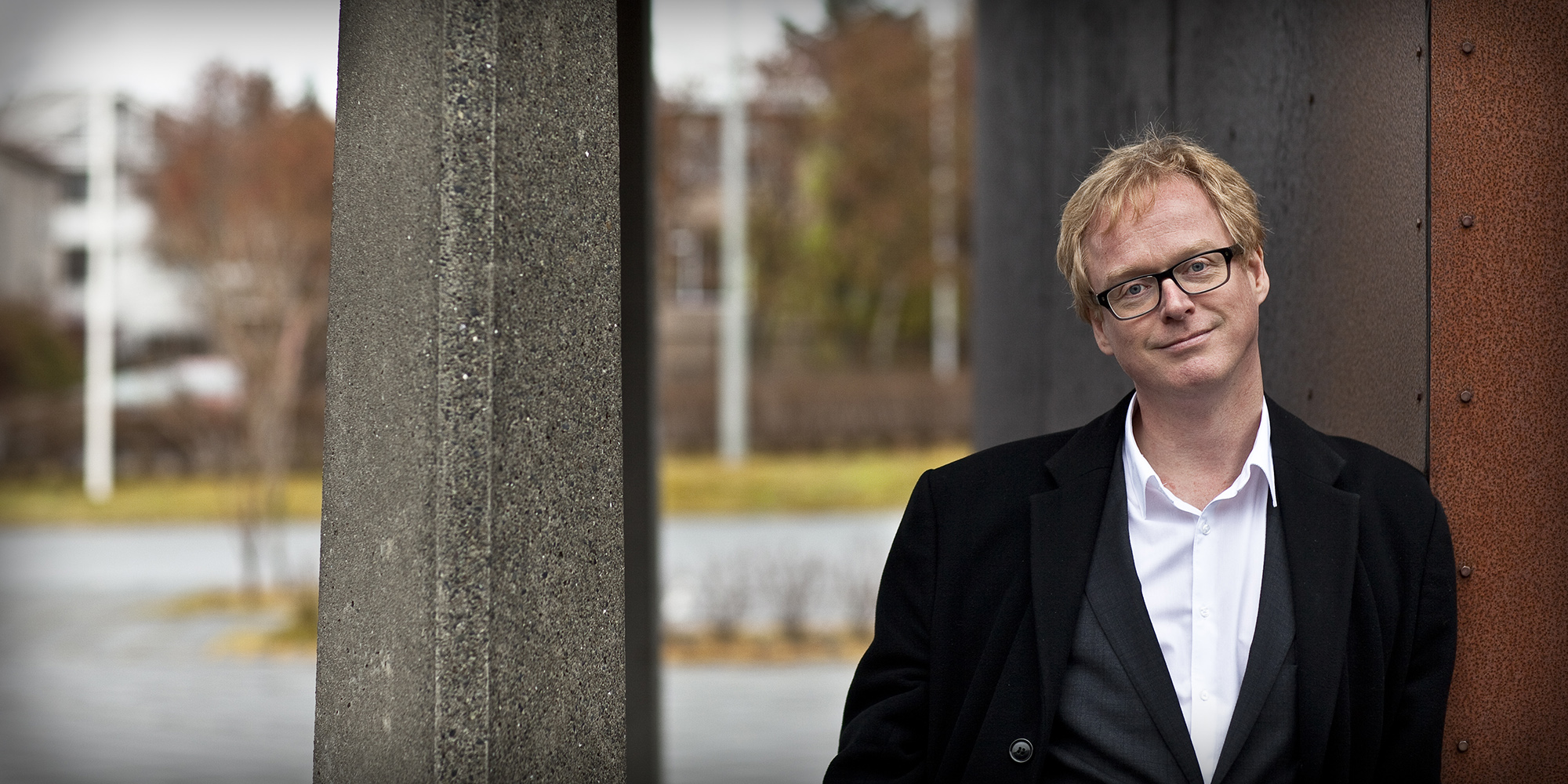
Jon Danielsson

- Jon Danielsson, professor at London School of Economics, lecturer of the Financial Systems and Regulation at DSF
- Noreena Hertz, academic, economist and best-selling author
- Winter Jaap, dean of Vrije Universiteit
- Laurens de Haan, a Dutch economist and Emeritus Professor of Probability and Mathematical Statistics at the Erasmus University Rotterdam
- Bernd Jan Sikken, Director of Business Development and Innovation at DSF, former director at World Economic Forum
- Enrico Perotti, Professor of International Finance, Former Chair, Finance Group
- Ralph ter Hoeven, Professor of Financial Reporting at University of Groningen, partner at Deloitte
- Rene Hooft Graafland, Executive Board and CFO at Heineken
- Wim Holterman, Professor of Business Valuation, University of Groningen, and Managing Partner of the valuation practice of PwC in the Netherlands

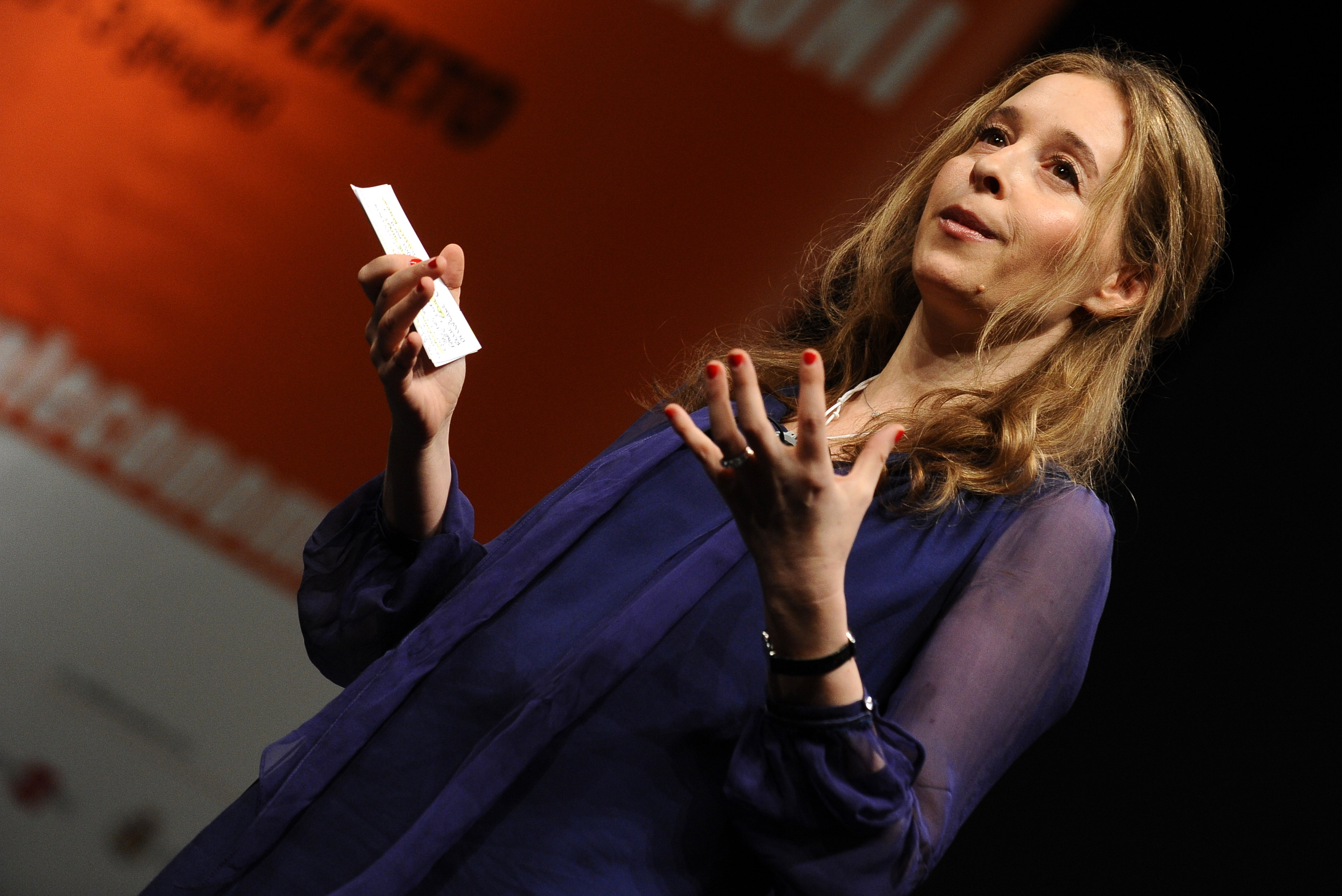
Noreena Hertz

- Jasper Knol Bruins, Merger Integration & Carve Out Services leader at Deloitte
- Bart de Klerk, Director at ING Corporate Finance
- Robert-Jan van de Kraats, CFO and vice-chairman on executive board at Randstad
- Joost Kromhout, executive director at Rabobank Equity Capital Markets
- Daan van Manen Senior Director M&A, Philips
- Jaap van Manen, Professor of Corporate Governance at University of Groningen, partner at Strategic Management Centre
- Rob Oudman, managing director at Leonardo & Co
- Cees van Rijn, Former CFO and executive board member at Nutreco, and has held various supervisory board positions
- Joeseph A. McCahery, Director of LLM Program at DSF

=== Public lectures ===
The public lectures were organized by the school's partners in the financial industry.

- William Rhodes, an American banker and philanthropist
- Aswath Damodaran, a professor of finance at the Stern School of Business at New York University
- Nassim Nicholas Taleb, an essayist, scholar, statistician, and risk analyst
- Charles Goodhart, a former member of the Bank of England's Monetary Policy Committee

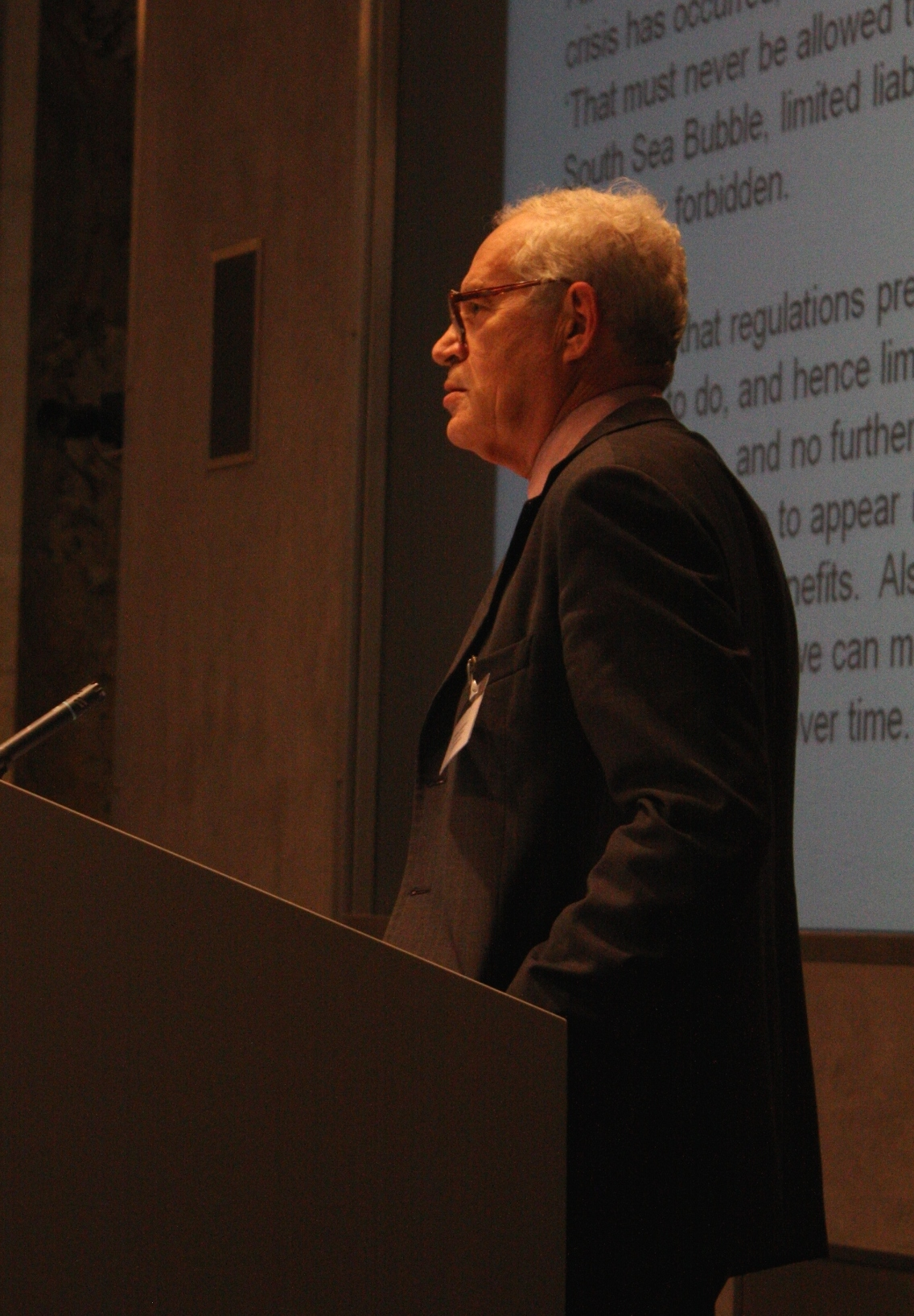
Charles Goodhart delivers the 2012 Long Finance conference keynote speech.

- Khalid Bakkali, Director M&A, NIBC
- Jan Louis Burggraaf, M&A partner at Allen & Overy
- Costas Constantinou, Senior Manager at EY's valuation and business modelling practice in the Netherlands
- Kees Cools, Partner Strategy, formerly Booz & Company
- Teun Teeuwisse, Equity Analyst at Kempen & Co
- Jeroen van der Wal, Practice Leader Valuation at Deloitte in the Netherlands
- Jeroen Weimer, Practice Leader Valuation at KPMG Corporate Finance in the Netherlands
- Henk van Dalen, Former CFO of DSM, TNT and Vimpelcom
- Casper de Vries, Chair of Monetary Economics at the Erasmus School of Economics
- Arne Grimme, M&A partner at De Brauw Blackstone Westbroek
- Hans Haanappel, independent corporate finance advisor
- Wouter van der Heijden, Director at KPMG Corporate Finance
- Roderick van den Hemel Vice President at ING Corporate Finance

== Students ==
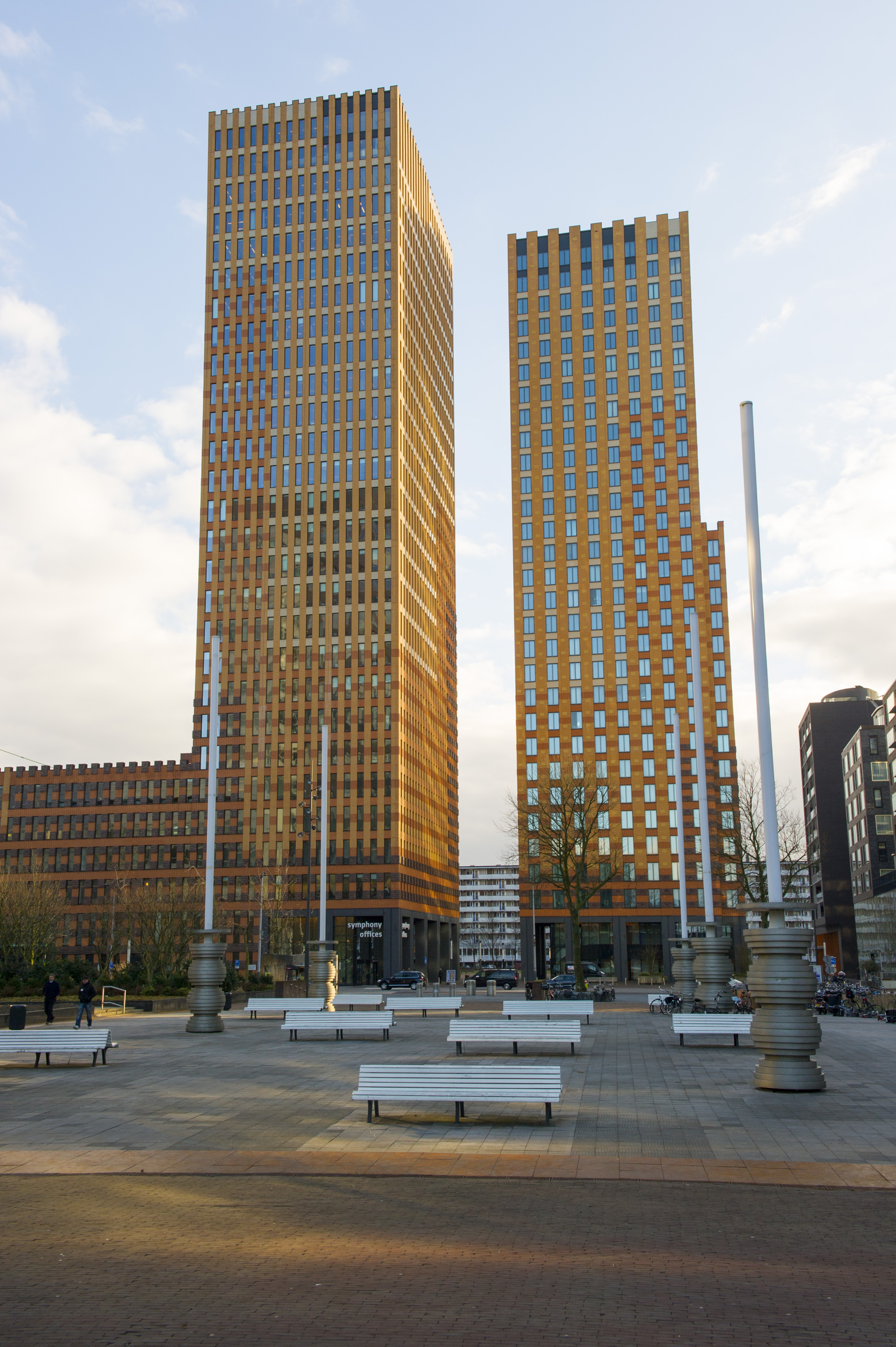
DSF campus at the Symphony Offices in Amsterdam Zuid

On average, the school had 90 students each year with approximately 25 students enrolled in each program. Students on Masters courses studied either full-time or part-time. The majority of the students were international, with an average age between 26 and 28. The coursework normally included an internship in finance or a related field, generally with one of the partnering institutions.

The Higher School of Economics had a dual-Masters agreement with DSF and annually 5-10% of the student body was from Russia. Other students came from India, China, Africa, Indonesia, USA, and Latin America. Students from The Netherlands represented around 30-35% of the student body.

== Public events ==
Duisenberg School of Finance hosted public debates on topics related to international finance, economics and banking. The debates featured speakers and panelists from DNB, EIOPA and IMF, amongst others. The results of these public debates were sometimes useful to partnering financial institutions.

It was DSF tradition to open the academic year with one of the students ringing the bell at NYSE Euronext.

== School management ==
Board of Directors
Name	Title
Joseph Streppel	Chairman, Duisenberg School of Finance Board
Jean-Pierre Boelen	Member Global Financial Services Board & Managing Partner Financial Services Practice Netherlands, Deloitte
Kees van Dijkhuizen	Chief Financial Officer of ABN AMRO
Lex Hoogduin	University of Amsterdam, Advisor to the Board of DSF
Carla Mahieu	Executive Vice President AEGON., Global Head Human Resources.
Angelien Kemna	Member of the executive board and CFRO, APG
Pr. Dr. Dirk Schoenmaker	Dean, Duisenberg school of finance
Job Swank	Member of the Governing Board of De Nederlandsche Bank
Koos Timmermans	Vice-chairman ING Bank
Hans Vijlbrief	Treasurer-General at the Dutch Ministry of Finance, the former President of De Nederlandsche Bank

=== Executive Fellowship ===
Members of partnering institutions collaborated with the school and with each other through the Executive Fellows program. The Executive Fellows worked together with the school research team regarding developments (and challenges) of the finance industry. Herman Mulder was a prominent figure in the Executive Fellow program until the school was integrated into the VU/UVA honorary program in October 2015.

== Scholarships and awards ==
Duisenberg School of Finance offered the Wim Duisenberg (EU) Scholarship, Thesis Competition, Dutch Board Member Leadership Award, Women in Finance Scholarship, country-specific scholarships, Orange Tulip Scholarship, and the ING Loan Scheme. Duisenberg Battle winners were awarded scholarships as well.
