= General Representation of the Government of Flanders in Pretoria =

The General Representation of the Government of Flanders in Pretoria is the diplomatic office of Flanders in Southern Africa. It is responsible for all official contacts with seven countries in the region: Botswana, Eswatini, Malawi, Mozambique, Namibia, Lesotho and South Africa. It is located at 497 Cameron Street in Pretoria, the capital and diplomatic heart of South Africa.

Flanders is the northern region of Belgium, which has its own network of foreign representation. It has 11 missions around the world. This is a form of regional sub-state diplomacy.

== Tasks of the General Representation ==
A General Representation has a broad political and diplomatic mandate. It represents the Government of Flanders externally for all its internal competences within the Belgian state structure.

=== Development cooperation ===
In South Africa, the General Representation works with the South African government and civil society on climate adaptation and the green economy. The satellite office in Maputo, Mozambique, works on health care (especially on health care access for adolescents). In Lilongwe, Malawi, there is also a satellite office, focusing on agriculture and food security.

=== Culture ===
The General Representation facilitates exchanges between South African and Flemish artists and promotes Flemish 'state of the art' culture in Southern Africa. To this end, partnerships are set up with local arts festivals and cultural institutions.

=== Academic diplomacy ===
Many Flemish universities and university colleges have established cooperation agreements with institutions in South Africa or in one of the other countries in the region. The General Representation supports these contacts and participates in study fairs and science fora.

=== Other contacts ===
Foreign trade and investment is also a competence within the foreign policy of Flanders. A separate agency was set up to deal with business-related issues, Flanders Investment & Trade. The agency has an office in Johannesburg. The General Representation and the Flemish administration also work with South Africa on youth policy, human rights and good governance.

== General Representative ==
Since July 2014, Dr. Geraldine Reymenants has taken up the post of General Representative in Pretoria. She has four deputies. In Pretoria, Zvi Raman is the Deputy for general affairs, whilst Katrien Vandepladutse focuses on the development cooperation programme with South Africa. In the satellite offices, there are also development cooperation experts: Kaat Matthys in Maputo and Nikolas Bosscher in Lilongwe
