= The Economics of Ecosystems and Biodiversity =

Study

The Economics of Ecosystems and Biodiversity (TEEB) was a study led by Pavan Sukhdev from 2007 to 2011. It is an international initiative to draw attention to the global economic benefits of biodiversity. Its objective is to highlight the growing cost of biodiversity loss and ecosystem degradation and to draw together expertise from the fields of science, economics and policy to enable practical actions. TEEB aims to assess, communicate and mainstream the urgency of actions through its five deliverables—D0: science and economic foundations, policy costs and costs of inaction, D1: policy opportunities for national and international policy-makers, D2: decision support for local administrators, D3: business risks, opportunities and metrics and D4: citizen and consumer ownership.

One motive for the study was to establish an objective global standard basis for natural capital accounting. Estimates establish the cost of biodiversity and ecosystem damage expected to cost 18% of global economic output by 2050 and currently at over US$2T (for the largest 3000 companies according to Trucost), with some estimates as high as US$6T/year. The World Bank in particular has led recent efforts to include the cost of biodiversity and climate harm in national accounts.

Its sponsors declared TEEB to be a "major international initiative to draw attention to the global economic benefits of biodiversity, to highlight the growing costs of biodiversity loss and ecosystem degradation, and to draw together expertise from the fields of science, economics and policy to enable practical actions moving forward." In October 2010 it released its report "Mainstreaming the Economics of Nature: a synthesis of the approach, conclusions and recommendations of TEEB" and launched the Bank of Natural Capital to communicate its findings to the general public.

== History ==
The TEEB study was launched by Germany and the European Commission in response to a proposal by the G8+5 Environment Ministers in Potsdam, Germany in 2007, to develop a global study on the economics of biodiversity loss. The second phase of the TEEB study is hosted by the United Nations Environment Programme (UNEP) with support from a number of organizations, including the European Commission, German Federal Ministry for Environment, Nature Conservation and Nuclear Safety and the UK Department for Environment, Food and Rural Affairs.

Pavan Sukhdev, a senior banker from Deutsche Bank, and founder-director of the green accounting project GIST (Green Indian States Trust) in India. The TEEB Advisory Board includes experts from the fields of science and economics.

The TEEB Interim Report was released in May 2008 under Phase I. The report provided evidence for significant global and local economic losses and human welfare impacts due to the ongoing losses of biodiversity and degradation of ecosystems. It focused largely on forests and looked at the extent of losses of natural capital taking place as a result of deforestation and degradation. TEEB estimates that this is US$2–4.5 trillion per year, every year.

Phase II of the study set out to expand on the work begun in Phase I. It was completed in 2010 and presented in Nagoya, Japan, at the 10th Conference of the Parties of the Convention on Biological Diversity (CBD) in October 2010. The final volumes of TEEB are being published by Earthscan. The first volume published in October 2010: The Economics of Ecosystems and Biodiversity: Ecological and Economic Foundations. The second, third and fourth volumes will be published over the course of 2011.

== Advisory board members ==
- Achim Steiner, Executive Director, United Nations Environment Programme
- Ahmed Djoghlaf, Executive Secretary, Convention on Biological Diversity
- Nicholas Stern, IG Patel Professor of Economics and Government and Chairman of the London School of Economic's Grantham Research Institute on Climate Change and the Environment
- Julia Marton-Lefèvre, Director General, International Union for Conservation of Nature
- Herman Mulder, was Director-General and Head of Group Risk Management of ABN AMRO Bank, Amsterdam, Netherlands
- Peter May, President, International Society for Ecological Economics
- Ladislav Miko, Minister of Environment, Czech Republic
- Walter Reid, Director Conservation and Science Program, David and Lucile Packard Foundation
- Giles Atkinson, Reader in Environmental Policy, Department of Geography and Environment and Associate, Grantham Research Institute of Climate Change and Environment, London School of Economics
- Edward Barbier, Professor of Economics, Department of Economics and Finance, University of Wyoming
- Jacqueline McGlade, Executive Director, European Environment Agency
- Yolanda Kakabadse, President, World Wide Fund for Nature from January 2010
- Jochen Flasbarth, President, Federal Environment Agency, Germany
- Karl-Göran Mäler, Professor in Economics, Stockholm School of Economics and Director, Beijer International Institute of Ecological Economics
- Joan Martinez Alier, Professor, Department of Economics and Economic History, Universitat Autonoma de Barcelona

== Phase I: key messages ==
The world has already lost much of its biodiversity. TEEB indicates that pressure on commodity and food prices shows the consequences of this loss to society. TEEB recommends that urgent remedial action is essential because species loss and ecosystem degradation are inextricably linked to human well-being. Economic growth and the conversion of natural ecosystems to agricultural production are forecast to continue, but TEEB feels that it is essential to ensure that such development takes proper account of the real value of natural ecosystems. This is central to both economic and environmental management.

The findings of TEEB (Interim Report) were largely in three areas—the economic size and welfare impact of losses of ecosystems and biodiversity, the strong links between biodiversity conservation and ecosystem health on the one hand and poverty elimination and the achievement of Millennium Development Goals on the other, and the ethical choices involved in selecting a social discount rate for discounting the benefits of ecosystems and biodiversity.

=== Main findings ===
- 11% of the natural areas remaining in 2000 could be lost, chiefly as a result of conversion for agriculture, the expansion of infrastructure, and climate change.
- Almost 40% of the land currently under low-impact forms of agriculture could be converted to intensive agricultural use, with further biodiversity losses.
- It is estimated that for an annual investment of US$45 billion into protected areas alone, the delivery of ecosystem services worth some US$5 trillion a year could be secured.

TEEB finds that sound ecosystem and biodiversity management, and the inclusion of natural capital in governmental and business accounting can start to redress inaction and reduce the cost of future losses.

== Phase II ==
TEEB Phase II, currently underway, takes an economic approach that is spatially specific and builds on knowledge of how ecosystems function and deliver services. It examines how ecosystems and their associated services are likely to respond to particular policy actions. A fundamental focus of TEEB is on developing an economic yardstick that is more effective than GDP for assessing the performance of an economy. TEEB recommends that national accounting systems need to be more inclusive in order to measure the significant human welfare benefits that ecosystems and biodiversity provide. Such systems can help policy makers adopt the right measures and design appropriate financing mechanisms for conservation.

In Phase II TEEB aims to:

- Integrate ecological and economic knowledge to structure the evaluation of ecosystem services under different scenarios.
- Recommend appropriate valuation methodologies for different contexts.
- Examine the economic costs of biodiversity decline and the costs and benefits of actions to reduce these losses.
- Develop ‘toolkits’ for policy makers at international, regional and local levels to foster sustainable development and better conservation of ecosystems and biodiversity.
- Enable easy access to leading information and tools for improved biodiversity practice for the business community—from the perspective of managing risks, addressing opportunities, and measuring impacts.
- Raise public awareness of the individual’s impact on biodiversity and ecosystems, and areas where individual action can make a positive difference.

== Climate issues update ==
TEEB's Climate Update stated that an agreement on funding for forests was a key priority for governments attending the 2009 United Nations Climate Change Conference in Copenhagen.

An estimated 5 gigatonnes or 15% of worldwide carbon dioxide emissions are absorbed or 'sequestrated' by forests every year, making them the "mitigation engine" of the natural world.

TEEB finds that investing in ecosystem-based measures such as financing Reducing Emissions from Deforestation and Forest Degradation (REDD) can thus assist in combating climate change and can also be a key anti-poverty and adaptation measure.

The Update also underlines a 'Coral Reef Emergency' that is already here as a result of the current build-up of greenhouse gases. Scientists contributing to the TEEB process indicate that irreversible damage to coral reefs can occur at atmospheric CO_{2} concentrations of over 350 parts per million (ppm). This is linked with rising temperatures and ocean acidification. Concentrations are above this threshold and rising. It raises concerns that stabilizing CO_{2} levels at 450 ppm, or some 16% above the current levels, may condemn this critical, multibillion-dollar ecosystem to extinction and take with it the livelihoods of 500 million people within a matter of decades.

== Green economy initiative ==
The UNEP's green economy initiative is a project designed to communicate that the greening of economies is not a burden on growth but rather a new engine for growth, employment, and the reduction of persistent global poverty. The green economy report, published in February 2011, used economic analysis and modelling approaches to provide an in-depth assessment of identified economic sectors where "greening" might lead to prosperity and job creation (i.e. traditional economic growth). This promotes sectors regarded as necessary for a green economy such as: agriculture, buildings, cities, fishery, forests, industry, renewable energy, transport, tourism, waste management, and water as well as the enabling conditions in finance, domestic and international policy architecture.

== Criticism ==
The approach to valuing ecosystems encapsulated by the TEEB project has been criticized and is open to the same problems as affect all mainstream economic value theories. More specifically the argument is that prices need to be corrected for market failure and simple adjustments can be made to correct the price system so resources will be allocated efficiently. The basis for this recalculation is human preferences for nature, ecosystems, bugs and plants. One critique concerns the irrelevance of human preferences for determining what is ecologically essential for the maintenance of life support systems. Human preferences may be a good guide to choosing ice cream flavors but not the mix of species or gases in the atmosphere necessary to sustain life.

== See also ==
- Millennium Ecosystem Assessment
- Special Report on Climate Change and Land
- Global Assessment Report on Biodiversity and Ecosystem Services
