= Herman Mulder =

Dutch businessman

- Born: Netherlands
- Education: Leiden University (1969); Erasmus University Rotterdam (1972)
- Occupations: Advisor, executive director
- Employers: ABN Amro (1998–2006); True Price Foundation
- Known for: Sustainable Development

Herman Mulder is an institutional adviser, speaker, lecturer and author on sustainable finance issues. He is a pioneer of the Equator Principles, used by banks to voluntarily assess and manage social and environmental risk.

Mulder is a co-founder and chairman of the True Price Foundation, member of the Board of the Dutch National Contact Point for the OECD Guidelines for MNE's, and the chairman of the Global Reporting Initiative (GRI), the International Institute of Governance & Leadership (IIGL) and the TEEB Advisory Board.

== Career ==
In the past, Mulder was a senior executive vice-president at ABN AMRO (1998–2006), and is now an independent board member with a focus on sustainable development issues. During his career at ABN Amro, he held a position in relationship management (notably energy), structured finance. From 1998 he served as Senior Executive Vice President (SEVP), Head of Group Risk Management, and Co-chair of the Group Risk Committee. He initiated and coordinated the ABN AMRO initiative on Sustainable Development (SD). Mr. Mulder played key role in the creation of NFX, a coordinated platform between the Dutch government and Dutch financial sector focused on finance for development. Mr. Mulder was the first chairman of the ABN AMRO Group Foundation.

Mulder was an Executive Fellow at Duisenberg School of Finance, since the foundation of the school in 2007. Mulder was Senior Advisor to the UN Global Compact and the World Business Council for Sustainable Development. Previously working in the field of social development finance in India and Brazil.

== Contribution to sustainability ==
The perspectives of Mulder about inclusive economy and the significance of impact investment have received a particular prominence during the post-2009 crises period, when the financial institutions began to pro-actively adopt non-financial metrics. His research and institutional activism have largely contributed to the adoption of socio-environmental considerations amongst major international financial organizations.

Mulder plays an active role in the international development of the integration of the sustainability topics in corporate development and investment mechanisms. In his work, he emphasizes on the importance of the feedback mechanism of the NGOs interacting with other stakeholders, like the governments, corporations and regular citizens. He is also a member of the jury of Dutch Sustainable Supply Chain Award (since 2007), an Ambassador of the International Integrated Reporting Council (IIRC) and advisor to the Natural Capital Coalition (NCC).

In November 2005, Mulder received a knighthood of the Order of Oranje-Nassau as a recognition for his active role in the development of the sustainability topics and Dutch economy. After which he was promoted to be an officer in the same order in October 2017 for his work as chairman of the Sustainable Development Goals - Dutch Charter Coalition.

== See also ==
- Global Reporting Initiative
- The Economics of Ecosystems and Biodiversity
- ABN Amro
- Duisenberg School of Finance
