= Environmental full-cost accounting =

Cost accounting method

Environmental full-cost accounting (EFCA) is a method of cost accounting that traces direct costs and allocates indirect costs by collecting and presenting information about the possible environmental costs and benefits or advantages – in short, about the "triple bottom line" – for each proposed alternative. It is one aspect of true cost accounting (TCA), along with Human capital and Social capital. As definitions for "true" and "full" are inherently subjective, experts consider both terms problematic. (Note: See Green economics.)

Since costs and advantages are usually considered in terms of environmental, economic and social impacts, full or true cost efforts are collectively called the "triple bottom line". Many standards now exist in this area including Ecological Footprint, eco-labels, and the International Council for Local Environmental Initiatives' approach to triple bottom line using the ecoBudget metric. The International Organization for Standardization (ISO) has several accredited standards useful in FCA or TCA including for greenhouse gases, the ISO 26000 series for corporate social responsibility coming in 2010, and the ISO 19011 standard for audits including all these.

Because of this evolution of terminology in the public sector use especially, the term full-cost accounting is now more commonly used in management accounting, e.g. infrastructure management and finance. Use of the terms FCA or TCA usually indicate relatively conservative extensions of current management practices, and incremental improvements to GAAP to deal with waste output or resource input.

These have the advantage of avoiding the more contentious questions of social cost.

== Concepts ==
Full-cost accounting embodies several key concepts that distinguish it from standard accounting techniques. The following list highlights the basic tenets of FCA.

Accounting for:

1. Costs rather than outlays (see explanation below);
2. Hidden costs and externalities;
3. Overhead and indirect costs;
4. Past and future outlays;
5. Costs according to lifecycle of the product.

=== Costs rather than outlays ===
Expenditure of cash to acquire or use a resource. A cost is the cash value of the resource as it is used. For example, an outlay is made when a vehicle is purchased, but the cost of the vehicle is incurred over its active life (e.g., ten years). The cost of the vehicle must be allocated over a period of time because every year of its use contributes to the depreciation of the vehicle's value.

=== Hidden costs ===
The value of goods and services is reflected as a cost even if no cash outlay is involved. One community might receive a grant from a state, for example, to purchase equipment. This equipment has value, even though the community did not pay for it in cash. The equipment, therefore, should be valued in an FCA analysis.

Government subsidies in the energy and food production industries keep true costs low through artificially cheap product pricing. This price manipulation encourages unsustainable practices and further hides negative externalities endemic to fossil fuel production and modern mechanized agriculture.

=== Overhead and indirect costs ===
FCA accounts for all overhead and indirect costs, including those that are shared with other public agencies. Overhead and indirect costs might include legal services, administrative support, data processing, billing, and purchasing. Environmental costs as indirect costs include the full range of costs throughout the life-cycle of a product (Life cycle assessment), some of which even do not show up in the firm's bottom line. It also contains fixed overhead, fixed administration expense etc.

=== Past and future outlays ===
Past and future cash outlays often do not appear on annual budgets under cash accounting systems. Past (or upfront) costs are initial investments necessary to implement services such as the acquisition of vehicles, equipment, or facilities. Future (or back-end) outlays are costs incurred to complete operations such as facility closure and postclosure care, equipment retirement, and post-employment health and retirement benefits.

== Examples ==
Car life cycle

=== Waste management ===
The State of Florida uses the term full-cost accounting for its solid waste management. In this instance, FCA is a systematic approach for identifying, summing, and reporting the actual costs of solid waste management. It takes into account past and future outlays, overhead (oversight and support services) costs, and operating costs.

Integrated solid waste management systems consist of a variety of municipal solid waste (MSW) activities and paths. Activities are the building blocks of the system, which may include waste collection, operation of transfer stations, transport to waste management facilities, waste processing and disposal, and sale of byproducts. Paths are the directions that MSW follows in the course of integrated solid waste management (i.e., the point of generation through processing and ultimate disposition) and include recycling, composting, waste-to-energy, and landfill disposal. The cost of some activities is shared between paths. Understanding the costs of MSW activities is often necessary for compiling the costs of the entire solid waste system, and helps municipalities evaluate whether to provide a service itself or contract out for it. However, in considering changes that affect how much MSW ends up being recycled, composted, converted to energy, or landfilled, the analyst should focus the costs of the different paths. Understanding the full costs of each MSW path is an essential first step in discussing whether to shift the flows of MSW one way another.

==== Benefits ====
Identify the costs of MSW management
When municipalities handle MSW services through general tax funds, the costs of MSW management can get lost among other expenditures. With FCA, managers can have more control over MSW costs because they know what the costs are.

See through the peaks and valleys in MSW cash expenditures
Using techniques such as depreciation and amortization, FCA produces a more accurate picture of the costs of MSW programs, without the distortions that can result from focusing solely on a given year's cash expenditures.

Explain MSW costs to citizens more clearly
FCA helps you collect and compile the information needed to explain to citizens what solid waste management actually costs. Although some people might think that solid waste management is free (because they are not billed specifically for MSW services), others might overestimate its cost. FCA can result in "bottom line" numbers that speak directly to residents. In addition, public officials can use FCA results to respond to specific public concerns.

Adopt a business-like approach to MSW management
By focusing attention on costs, FCA fosters a more businesslike approach to MSW management. Consumers of goods and services increasingly expect value, which means an appropriate balance between quality and cost of service. FCA can help identify opportunities for streamlining services, eliminating inefficiencies, and facilitating cost-saving efforts through informed planning and decision-making.

Develop a stronger position in negotiating with vendors
When considering privatization of MSW services, solid waste managers can use FCA to learn what it costs (or would cost) to do the work. As a result, FCA better positions public agencies for negotiations and decision-making. FCA also can help communities with publicly run operations determine whether their costs are competitive with the private sector.

Evaluate the appropriate mix of MSW services
FCA gives managers the ability to evaluate the cost of each element of their solid waste system, such as recycling, composting, waste-to-energy, and landfilling. FCA can help managers avoid common mistakes in thinking about solid waste management, notably the error of treating avoided costs as revenues.

Fine-tune MSW programs
As more communities use FCA and report the results, managers might be able to "benchmark" their operations to similar communities or norms. This comparison can suggest options for "re-engineering" current operations. Furthermore, when cities, counties, and towns know what it costs to manage MSW independently, they can better identify any savings that might come from working together.

=== Food and Agriculture ===
Over the last ten years there has been considerable attention on Full Cost Accounting (FCA) or True Cost Accounting (TCA) in the field of food and agriculture. In 2013 and 2016, the Sustainable Food Trust organised two conferences on True Cost Accounting in food and farming, in the UK and the USA respectively. The FAO published two studies in 2014 and 2015 with a TCA-analysis of the impact of food wastage ("Food wastage footprint: full cost accounting") and another TCA-analysis of the total impact of world food production on Natural Capital ("Natural Capital Impacts in Agriculture"). In the first report, the FAO came to the conclusion that the yearly hidden impact of food wastage on Natural Capital amounted to US$700 billion while the hidden impact on social capital amounted to US$900 billion dollars. In the second report, the FAO estimated the environmental damage of the world food production at US$2330 billion per year.

== Motives for adoption ==
Various motives for adoption of FCA/TCA have been identified. The most significant of which tend to involve anticipating market or regulatory problems associated with ignoring the comprehensive outcome of the whole process or event accounted for. In green economics, this is the major concern and basis for critiques of such measures as GDP. The public sector has tended to move more towards longer term measures to avoid accusations of political favoritism towards specific solutions that seem to make financial or economic sense in the short term, but not longer term.

Corporate decision makers sometimes call on FCA/TCA measures to decide whether to initiate recalls, practice voluntary product stewardship (a form of recall at the end of a product's useful life). This can be motivated as a way to reduce future liabilities arising from those who are negatively affected by the waste a product becomes. Advanced theories of FCA, such as Natural Step, focus firmly on these. According to Ray Anderson, who instituted a form of FCA/TCA at Interface Carpet, used it to rule out decisions that increase Ecological Footprint and focus the company more clearly on a sustainable marketing strategy.

The urban ecology and industrial ecology approaches inherently advocate FCA — treating the built environment as a sort of ecosystem to minimize its own wastes.

== See also ==
- Environmental accounting
- Environmental pricing reform
- Environmental profit and loss account
- Externalities
- Genuine Progress Indicator
- Opportunity cost
- Pollution credit
- Social cost
- Total cost
- Total cost of ownership
- True cost accounting
- Whole-life cost
