= Yolanda Kakabadse =

Ecuadorian conservationist

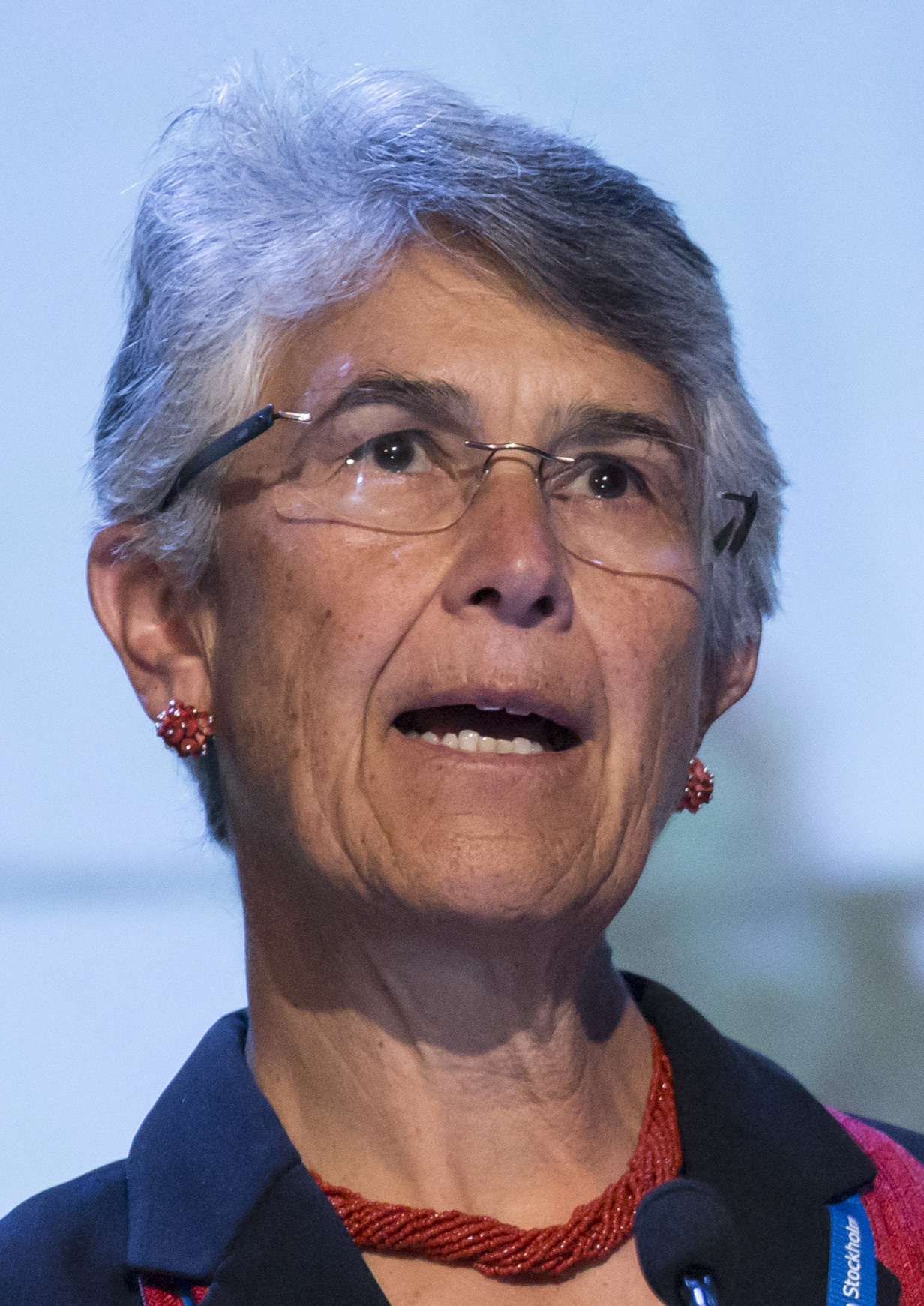
- kakabadse in 2013 Yolanda Kakabadse in 2013

11th President of International Union for Conservation of Nature (IUCN)
- In office 1996–2004
- Preceded by: Jay D. Hair
- Succeeded by: Mohammed Valli Moosa

8th President of World Wide Fund for Nature (WWF)
- In office 2010–2017
- Preceded by: Chief Emeka Anyaoku
- Succeeded by: Pavan Sukhdev

3rd Minister of Environment
- In office August 1998 – January 2000
- President: Jamil Mahuad
- Preceded by: Flor María Valverde Badillo
- Succeeded by: Rodolfo Rendón Blacio

Personal details
- Born: Yolanda Kakabadse Navarro; 1948 (age 77–78)
- Education: University of Quito
- Occupation: conservationist politician

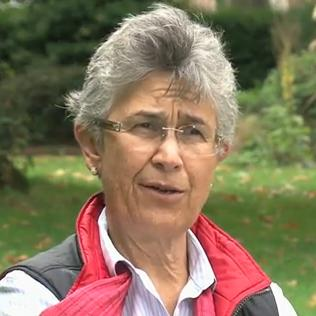
Yolanda Kakabadse in 2011.

Yolanda Kakabadse Navarro (born 1948) is an Ecuadorian conservationist of Georgian descent.

== Biography ==
After studies in Educational psychology at the University of Quito, she became involved in environmental issues. She was a founder of the Fundación Natura in Quito and was its executive director from 1979 to 1990. At the Rio Earth Summit, she acted as NGO liaison. In 1993, she was a founder of the Fundación Futuro Latinoamericano (www.ffla.net) and served until 2006 as the executive president of this NGO. From August 1998 to January 2000, she served as Minister of Environment in the government of Ecuador.

From 1996 to 2004, she was president of the International Union for Conservation of Nature (IUCN) and from 2010 to 2017, she was president of the World Wide Fund for Nature (WWF). She is also a member of Washington D.C.–based think tank the Inter-American Dialogue.

Yolanda Kakabadse is also a trustee of the Ford Foundation and was a board member of the LafargeHolcim Foundation for Sustainable Construction from 2004 until 2013.

Since 2017, Yolanda is the Chair of an IUCN-led Independent Scientific and Technical Advisory Panel, the Rio Doce Panel, created to advise the restoration efforts at the Rio Doce watershed in Brazil, following the Mariana dam disaster, in 2015.

Kakabadse is an Earth Charter International Commission member.
