= Joseph A. McCahery =

Joseph Aloysius McCahery
- Born: April 14, 1956 (age 70); Montclair, New Jersey, U.S.
- Education: University of Michigan (1985); Queens College, City University of New York (1988)
- Occupation: Corporate lawyer
- Employer: Tilburg University
- Known for: Investment funds regulation

Joseph Aloysius McCahery (born April 14, 1956) is an American academic researcher, corporate lawyer and institutional adviser. McCahery is most notable for his contribution in corporate finance and law, European business law, financial markets and banking regulations, the political economy of federalism and taxation.

As of 2015, McCahery is a professor of International Economic Law and the Financial Market Regulation at Tilburg University. As of the same year, McCahery was a director of the LLM Program at the Duisenberg School of Finance, though the school closed down later that year. During his career McCahery had served as a legal consultant for the Center for European Policy Studies, Monitoring Committee Corporate Governance, The Netherlands Ministry of Finance and OECD,

== Background ==
McCahery received his B.A. at the University of Michigan in 1985. Upon completion of his bachelor's degree, McCahery obtained Juris Doctor at the Queens College, City University of New York in May 1988. From 1991 till 1992, McCahery attended Oxford University the Faculty of Law and Centre for Socio-Legal Studies. In 1998 McCahery received his Ph.D. in Law at University of Warwick. His earliest publication was on the regulatory competition, economic regulation and law.

== Career ==
McCahery began his legal practice career in 1985 as a law clerk at the Winthrop Stimson Putnam & Roberts. In 1988 he worked as a summer associate for Meagher & Flom in New York. From 1988 till 1989 he worked as a judicial clerk at the Court of Appeals for the Sixth Circuit, Cincinnati, Ohio.

In 1989, McCahery started his academic career as a visiting lecturer at the Warwick University in England. In 1992 he became the full-time lecturer. In 1997 he started working as an associate professor in Private Law and Center for Law at Tilburg University in Netherlands. From 1998 till 2002, McCahery worked as a visiting faculty at the LLM Program at Leiden University.

In 2002 he resumed his career at the Tilburg University as a professor of international business law. From 2005 he worked as professor of corporate governance and innovation at the University of Amsterdam. He began his career at Duisenberg School of Finance in 2008, where he offers lectures to MSc students in M&A law and transactions, hedge funds and investment management regulation. In 2000, McCahery was awarded a prize for one of the best corporate and securities articles of the year.

== Research and publications ==
McCahery had contributed to the literature on cross-border tax cooperation, effects of the corporate federalism, limitations of the corporate governance principles. McCahery is most notable for his research on topics of institutional investment principles, studies of M&A waves and investment funds regulations. His recent works on corporate governance principles has been dedicated to the analysis of the contractual formations of the venture capital companies and early stage investment general partnership firms.

== Books ==
- W. Bratton & J. McCahery (eds), Activist Investors, Hedge Funds and Corporate Governance (Oxford University Press, 2015, July Forthcoming).
- J. McCahery & E. Vermeulen (eds), The Law and Economics of Alliances and Joint Ventures (Cambridge University Press, 2015, Forthcoming).
- J. McCahery & T. Raaijmakers (eds), Fiduciary Duties, Institutional Investors and Enforcement (Eleven International Publishing, 2015 Forthcoming).
- J. McCahery, L. Timmerman and E. Vermeulen (eds), Private Company Law Reform: International and European Perspectives (Asser/Cambridge University Press, 2010). ISBN 978-9067042512
- J. McCahery & E. Vermeulen, Corporate Governance of Non-listed Companies (Oxford University Press, 2008) (paperback published 2010) (translated in Chinese, China Financial Publishing House 2015). ISBN 978-0199596386
- L. Bouchez, M. Knubben, J. McCahery, and L. Timmerman (eds) The Quality of Corporate Law and the Role of Corporate Law Judges (ACCF/OECD/EZ 2006)
- D. Curtin, A, Klip, J. Smits and J. McCahery, European Integration and Law (Antwerp: Intersentia 2006).
- J. Armour & J. McCahery (eds), After Enron: Improving Corporate Law and Modernising Securities Regulation in Europe (Hart Publishing 2006). ISBN 978-1841135311
- J. McCahery & E. Vermeulen, Understanding (Un)incorporated Business Forms (ACCF 2005) (Russian translation, National Council on Corporate Governance 2007).
- J. McCahery, T. Raaijmakers and E. Vermeulen (eds), The Governance of Close Corporations and Partnerships: US and European Perspectives (Oxford University Press 2004).
- J. McCahery, L. Renneboog with P. Ritter and S. Haller, The Economics of the Proposed European Takeover Directive (Centre for European Policy Studies, 2003).
- J. McCahery & L. Renneboog (eds), Venture Capital and the Valuation of High Tech Firms (Oxford University Press 2003).
- J. McCahery, P. Moerland, T. Raaijmakers, and L. Renneboog (eds) Corporate Governance Regimes (Oxford University Press 2002).
- R. Vriesendorp, J. McCahery, and F. Verstijlen (eds), Comparative and International Perspectives on Bankruptcy Reform in the Netherlands (Boom 2001).
- J. McCahery & T. Raaijmakers, Corporate Governance and Capital Markets: An International Perspective (SMO Press, 2000).
- W. Bratton, J. McCahery, C. Scott and S. Picciotto (eds), International Regulatory Competition and Coordination: Europe and the United States (Oxford University Press 1997).
- J. McCahery, C. Scott and S. Picciotto (eds), Corporate Control and Accountability: Changing Structures and the Dynamics of Regulation (Oxford University Press 1993)
