= Bank of Natural Capital =

The Bank of Natural Capital is an educational initiative associated with The Economics of Ecosystems and Biodiversity (TEEB) to communicate natural capital investment and value theory related to what are sometimes called "economic intangibles" to the global public, in particular the direct economic and financial value of ecosystem services to man.

It encapsulates the idea that the natural world is defined as capital and something to profit on through a capitalist society, saying 'we pay for things we find valuable'. The capitalist construction of nature as something with a value will lead to, as already apparent its over-abstraction and system collapse.
