= Pavan Sukhdev =

Indian environmental economist (born 1960)

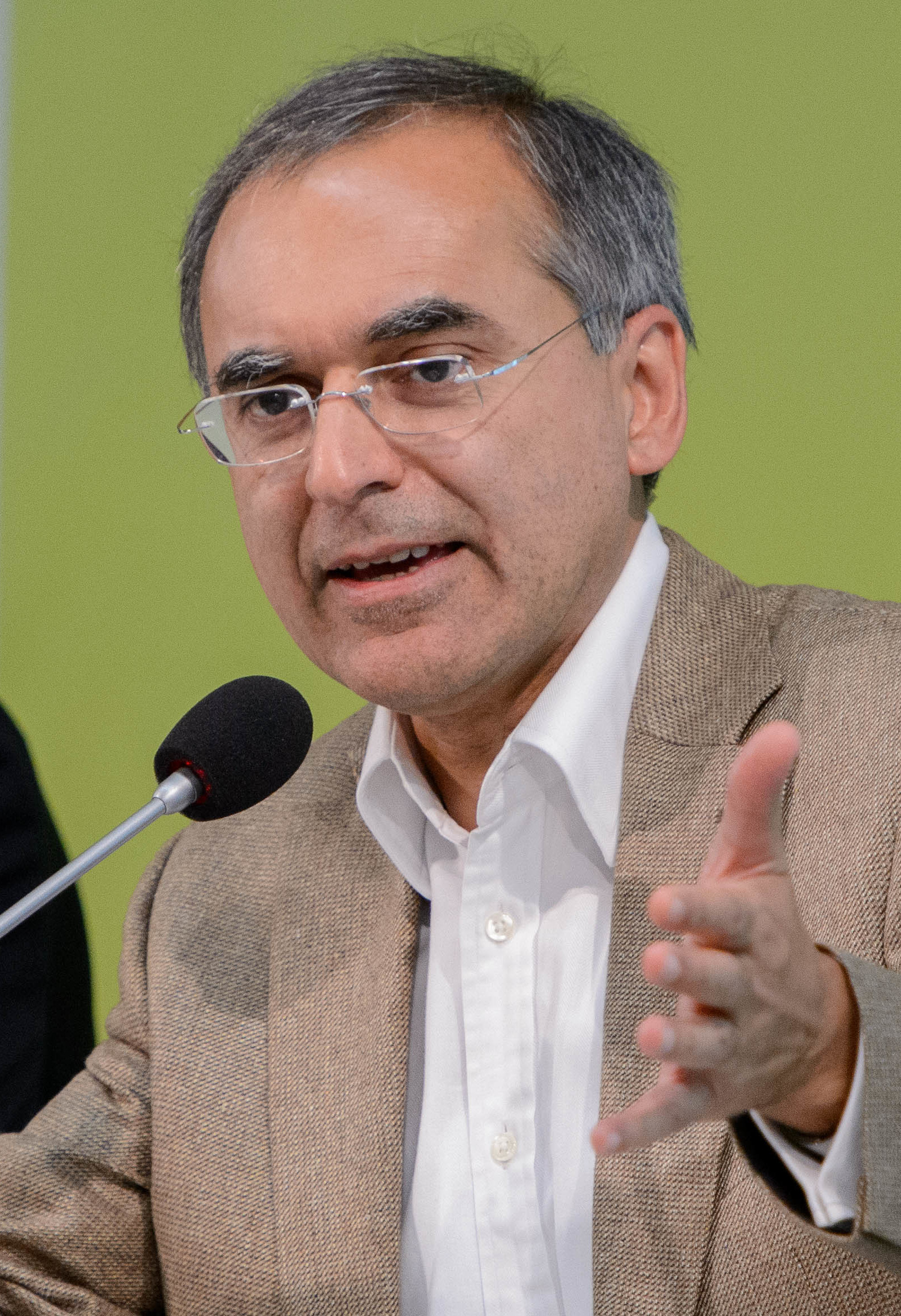
- Sukhdev in October 2013
- Born: 30 March 1960 (age 66); Delhi, India
- Education: Collège du Léman, Switzerland Dover College, United Kingdom University of Oxford, UK
- Occupation: Environmental economist
- Website: pavansukhdev.com

Pavan Sukhdev (born 30 March 1960) is an Indian environmental economist whose work focuses on the green economy, biodiversity, natural capital, and sustainable finance. He was the Special Adviser and Head of UNEP's Green Economy Initiative, a major UN project suite to demonstrate that greening of economies is not a burden on growth but rather a new engine for growing wealth, increasing decent employment, and reducing persistent poverty. Pavan was also the Study Leader for the ground breaking TEEB (The Economics of Ecosystems and Biodiversity) study commissioned by G8+5 and hosted by UNEP.

He is the Founder-CEO of GIST Impact, an impact data and analytics provider which helps companies and investors discover, measure, value, and manage their impacts on nature and society. In recognition of his continuing work in helping governments and corporations transition towards a Green Economy, UNEP appointed Pavan as the UNEP Goodwill Ambassador in the year 2012. He was also selected as the "Personality of the Year" by, Environmental Finance in the year 2010. The Institute of Ecology and Environmental Management (IEEM) have awarded Pavan their 2011 Medal.

Pavan was a visiting fellow at Yale University from 2011 to 2014, where he was awarded the McCluskey Fellowship. Whilst at Yale, he wrote the book "Corporation 2020" which envisions tomorrow's corporation, and shows how corporations and society can and should work together to achieve common goals and build a green economy.

He has chaired the World Economic Forum's "Global Agenda Council" on Ecosystems and Biodiversity (2009–2011) and was a speaker at Davos in 2010 and 2011.

== Career ==
=== Education ===
Sukhdev studied at the private international boarding school Collège du Léman. He later also studied English at Dover College, United Kingdom. He graduated with a degree in physics from University College, Oxford.

=== Financial markets ===
An international banker, Pavan was deeply involved in the evolution of India's currency, interest rate and derivatives markets in the mid-nineties, working with India's regulators and market participants. He has been a member of several Reserve Bank of India (RBI) committees for the development of India's financial markets, including the Sodhani Committee on Foreign Exchange Markets. In 1997 Pavan co-founded FIMMDA (Fixed Income Money Market and Derivatives Association of India), India's professional association for fixed income markets, money markets and derivatives. He championed the introduction of Overnight indexed swap (OIS) into India, which is currently India's most liquid traded interest rate swap instrument.

He worked with Deutsche Bank for 14 years and then took a sabbatical to lead two major environmental projects, TEEB (The Economics of Ecosystems and Biodiversity) and UNEP's Green Economy Initiative. While at Deutsche Bank in India, Pavan founded and later chaired GMC (Global Markets Centre) in Mumbai.

- 1983–1994: Pavan worked with the Australia and New Zealand Banking Group for eleven years (1983 -1994) both in India and in London, in various financial markets trading, sales, structuring, and management roles.
- 1994–1998: Pavan joined Deutsche Bank to head their Global Markets division in India, which he built into a leading fixed income business for the bank in India.
- 1998–1999: Pavan was appointed Chief Operating Officer for Deutsche Bank's Asian Global Markets business based in Singapore, overseeing the Asian regional integration in 1999 of Bankers Trust and Deutsche Bank for his division, Global Markets Asia.
- 1999–2003: Pavan headed Money Markets for Global Markets Asia, and then for Global Markets Asia-Pacific (including Japan and Australia).
- 2003–2005: He moved to Deutsche Bank London as Chief Operating Officer for the Bank's Global Emerging Markets division, which covers all global markets business in Latin America, Eastern Europe, and Asia.
- 2005–2006: When his division Global Markets merged with Global Equities in 2005, he transitioned to Global Markets Central Management in London to run a Business process reengineering (BPR) project for the new combined division, which in turn resulted in his ‘front-office off-shoring' initiative.
- 2006–2008: He founded and later chaired GMC Mumbai (Global Markets Centre, Mumbai), the division's global front-office off-shoring vehicle in Mumbai, which delivered leading-edge work for Global Markets in London, New York, and elsewhere.

=== Environment ===
Alongside his financial markets career, Pavan pursues long-standing interests in environmental economics and nature conservation through his work with different environmental organizations and projects.

==== Green Accounting for Indian States Project ====
Pavan is the Founder-Director of the Green Accounting for Indian States Project, an initiative of the Green Indian States Trust (GIST) to set up an economic valuation and national accounting framework to measure sustainability at the State level for India, including the hitherto ignored but significant economic externalities from sectors such as forestry, agriculture, fresh water, health, and education.

==== Conservation Action Trust ====
Pavan is the Co-founder and Chairperson for the first six years of Conservation Action Trust, an Indian NGO dedicated to achieving ecological sustainability for India by originating and proving model conservation projects, by educating and lobbying decision-makers and the public about the importance of forests for our water and food security, and when all else fails, through public interest litigation.

==== The Economics of Ecosystems and Biodiversity ====
Pavan was appointed by Germany's Environment Minister Gabriel and EU Environment Commissioner Dimas as the Study Leader for their G8+5 study on The Economics of Ecosystems and Biodiversity (TEEB). TEEB's Interim Report (2008), was welcomed globally for its fresh economic outlook, for demonstrating the economic significance of the loss of nature's services, and for connecting the economics of biodiversity and ecosystems with ethics, equity, and the alleviation of poverty. The Interim Report of TEEB was presented at the Ministerial session at COP-9 of the Convention of Biological Diversity (Bonn, 2008) and the final reports (a series of five solution-oriented studies) were presented at CBD Cop-10 (Nagoya, 2010). These reports have gained considerable currency with governments in both developing and developed nations, with business leaders, and with conservation NGO's. Later, in 2011, as part of his activities as the McCluskey Fellow, 2011, Pavan designed and delivered a 25-lecture, full 3-credits, post-graduate course on TEEB at Yale's School of Forestry & Environmental Studies.

==== Green Economy Initiative ====
UNEP appointed Pavan to lead its major initiative to demonstrate that the greening of economies is not a burden on growth but rather a new engine for growth, a source of new employment, and a means to poverty alleviation. The final report Towards a Green Economy of the Green Economy Initiative was presented at UNEP's general Council meeting at Nairobi, February 2011. Pavan continues to support this initiative as a UNEP Goodwill Ambassador.

==== World Economic Forum ====
Pavan chaired the Global Agenda Council on Biodiversity and Ecosystems for the World Economic Forum (2009-2011) to evaluate the problems of ecosystem degradation and biodiversity loss in the context of global risks and global co-operation. He speaks at the Forum's annual meetings at Davos.

==== Corporation 2020 ====
Pavan launched a global campaign called "Corporation 2020" at the Rio+20 conference in 2012. This campaign focusses global attention on the challenge of re-designing the Corporation through critical changes in four key areas of corporate performance (reporting, leverage, advertising, and taxation) to deliver a ‘green economy' from the micro-level upwards in order to achieve the goals of sustainable development.

==== President of World Wide Fund for Nature (WWF) International ====
He served as president of WWF International from 2017 to 2021.

GIST Impact

Pavan is the founder and CEO of GIST Impact.

== Honours and awards ==
- Selected "Personality of the Year" for 2010 by "Environmental Finance"
- Awarded a Medal in 2011 for his outstanding contribution to biodiversity conservation by Institute of Ecology and Environmental Management (IEEM)
- Appointed as "Dorothy McCluskey Fellow" for 2011 by Yale University. Previous McCluskey Fellows include Dr. Rajendra Pachauri & the late Dr. Wangari Maathai
- Appointed "UNEP Goodwill Ambassador" in 2012
- Recipient of the Gothenburg Award for Sustainable Development, in recognition for his work in the area of ‘Nature's services and ingenious solutions. Previous awardees include Al Gore & Dr. Gro Harlem Brundtland
- Recipient of the 2015 Bernhard Grzimek Prize for demonstrating that "eco-friendly development, far from being an obstacle to growth, is a driving force for growing prosperity, job creation and poverty reduction."
- Recipient of the Blue Planet Prize in 2016, awarded by Asahi Glass Foundation for outstanding achievements in scientific research and its application to solve global environmental problems.
- Recipient of the Tyler Prize for Environmental Achievement in 2020, for Sukhdev's groundbreaking 2008 report The Economics of Environment and Biodiversity (TEEB).

== Board memberships ==
=== Past board positions ===
- Worldwide Fund for Nature, WWF International, President, and Board Chair
- TEEB for Business Coalition Ltd, (Deputy Chairman)
- Human Development Report (HDR), UNDP (HDR Advisory Panel Member)
- Bombay Environmental Action Group (BEAG) (Board Member)
- Conservation Action Trust (CAT) (Chairman)
- Green Indian States Trust, Chennai (Founding Trustee)
- TEEB Advisory Board, Geneva (Board Member)
- Stockholm Resilience Centre, Stockholm (Board Member)
- Conservation International, Washington (Board Member)
- Global Reporting Initiative, Amsterdam (Board Member)
- Gulbenkian Oceans Initiative, Lisbon (Chairman, Advisory Board)

== Publications and articles ==
=== Books ===
- Corporation 2020: Transforming Business For Tomorrow's World. Washington, DC: Island Press, 2012.
- "Why Corporation 2020? The Case for a New Corporation in the Next Decade." Washington, DC: Island Press, 2012.
- Co-author of TEEB, "The Economics of Ecosystems and Biodiversity: Ecological and Economic Foundations." Earthscan, London, and Washington (2010): 456.

=== Publications ===
- Sukhdev, P., Wittmer, H., and Miller, D. (2014), ‘The Economics of Ecosystems and Biodiversity (TEEB): Challenges and Responses'
- Sukhdev, Pavan. "Transforming the Corporation into a Driver of Sustainability" State of the World 2013. Island Press/Center for Resource Economics, 2013. 143-153.
- Wittmer, H., Berghöfer, A., Sukhdev, P. (2013), Poverty reduction and biodiversity conservation: using the concept of ecosystem services to understand the linkages. In: Roe, D., Elliott, J., Sandbrook, C., Walpole, M. (eds.) Biodiversity conservation and poverty alleviation : exploring the evidence for a link, Conservation Science and Practice 12, Wiley, Oxford, 36 - 50
- Towards a Green Economy: Pathways to Sustainable Development & Poverty Eradication – A Synthesis for Policy-Makers, Lead author, UNEP, 2011.
- Sukhdev, P., et al. "Mainstreaming the Economics of Nature: A synthesis of the approach, conclusions, and recommendations of TEEB" The Economics of Ecosystems and Biodiversity (2010).
- The Economics of Ecosystems and Biodiversity (2010) TEEB Report for Business (2010), Co-author, UNEP-TEEB, July 2010
- Ring, I., Hansjürgens, B., Elmqvist, T., Wittmer, H., Sukhdev, P. (2010), Challenges in framing the economics of ecosystems and biodiversity: the TEEB initiative. Curr. Opin. Environ. Sustain. 2 (1-2), 15 - 26 10.1016/j.cosust.2010.03.005
- The Economics of Ecosystems and Biodiversity (2009) TEEB for National and International Policy Makers (2009), Co-author, UNEP-TEEB, November 2009
- India's Financial Sector - An Assessment (Volume III – Advisory Panel on Financial Stability and Stress Testing), Co-author. Reserve Bank of India, March 2009.
- The Economics of Ecosystems and Biodiversity – Interim Report, lead author, May 2008,
- The Economics of Ecosystems and Biodiversity, European Communities, 2008
- Environmental Accounting - Explorations in Methodology, Eds. Amitabh Kundu & Michael von Hauff, MANAK Publications, 2008. Co-author of two chapters: "Green Accounting Methodology for India and its States" and "Green Accounting for Forest Resources in India and its States".
- Accounting for Freshwater Quality in India, co-author, Green Accounting for Indian States Project, Monograph 8, TERI Press, September 2007
- Estimating the Value of Educational Capital Formation in India, co-author, Green Accounting for Indian States Project, Monograph 5, TERI Press, June 2007
- The Value of Biodiversity in India's Forests, co-author, Green Accounting for Indian States Project, Monograph 4, TERI Press, December 2006
- Natural resource accounting for Indian States – Illustrating the case of forest resources, co-author. Ecological Economics, 2007, vol. 61, issue 4, pages 635-649
- Accounting for the Ecological Services of India's Forests – Soil Conservation, Water Augmentation, and Flood Prevention, co-author, Green Accounting for Indian States Project, Monograph 7, TERI Press, April 2006
- Estimating the Value of Agricultural Cropland and Pasture land in India, co-author, Green Accounting for Indian States Project, Monograph 2, TERI Press, December 2005
- The Value of Timber, Carbon, Fuelwood, and Non-Timber Forest Products in India's Forests, co-author, Green Accounting for Indian States Project, Monograph 1, TERI Press, January 2005
- Interest Rate Risk and Derivatives, author of a chapter on The Future of India's Debt Market (Ed. G. Bhardwaj, Tata McGraw-Hill Series, 1998)
- Report of the Expert Group on Foreign Exchange Markets, (Reserve Bank of India, June 1995). Co-author of the Report and member of the Expert Group, headed by Executive Director of RBI, O.P. Sodhani. This "Sodhani Committee" Report is widely regarded as an enlightened blueprint for the development of India's foreign exchange market.

=== Articles ===
His articles include two opinion pieces for Nature (2009 and 2012), several blogs for The Guardian, and an opinion piece for The Economist Debate. From 2000, he has also written frequently for several Indian newspapers and magazines (Economic Times, Indian Express, Sanctuary) to popularize the concept of "Green GDP" in India, measuring holistic economic growth as against measuring increasing production and ‘GDP growth' as a yardstick of progress.
