= Edgardo Lander =

Venezuelan sociologist

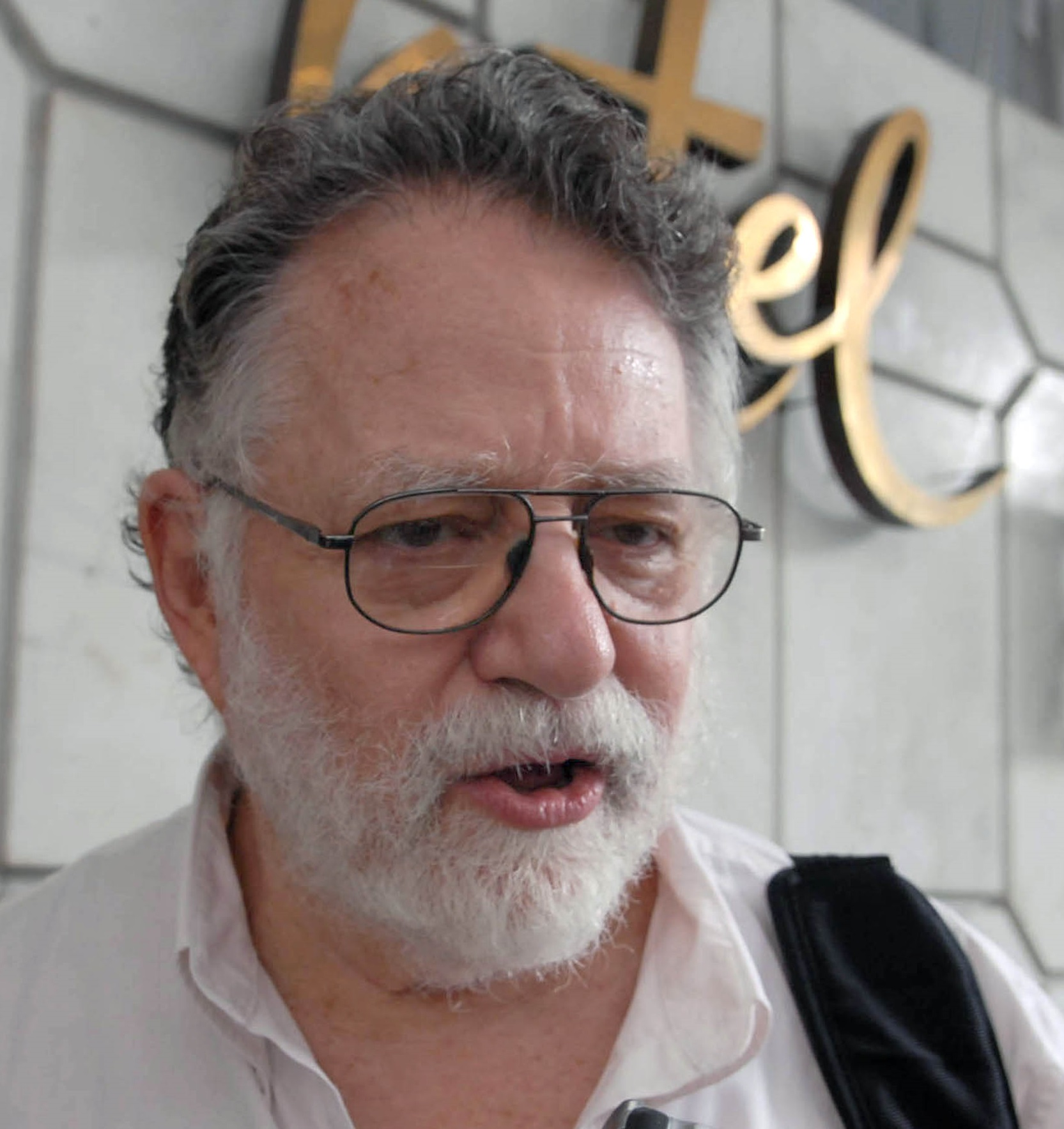
- Lander at the 2010 World Social Forum
- Born: 1942; Caracas, Venezuela

Academic background
- Education: Central University of Venezuela (Lic, 1964); Harvard University (PhD, 1977)
- Thesis: The theory of marginality from a Marxist perspective

Academic work
- Discipline: Sociology
- Institutions: Central University of Venezuela; Transnational Institute

Edgardo Lander (born 1942) is a Venezuelan sociologist and left-wing intellectual. A professor emeritus of the Central University of Venezuela and fellow of the Transnational Institute, he is the author of numerous books and research articles on democracy theory, the limits of industrialization and economic growth, and left-wing movements in Latin America.

== Life and career ==
Lander was born in Caracas. His father, Luis Lander, was one of the founding members of the Democratic Action party in Venezuela and had been a member of the short-lived Rómulo Gallegos government. After the 1948 coup d'état, his father was imprisoned for nearly a year. Upon his release, Luis Lander and his family went into exile and Lander spent his childhood and early teen-age years successively in Mexico, Canada, the US, and Costa Rica. The family returned to Venezuela following the overthrow of the military dictator Marcos Pérez Jiménez in 1958. His father went on to become the head of the Banco Obero de Venezuela (Workers' Bank of Venezuela) during the presidency of Rómulo Betancourt.

At university Lander initially vacillated between studying physics and psychology before eventually setting on sociology. He received his Licentiate in sociology from the Central University of Venezuela in 1964 and his PhD in sociology from Harvard University in 1977. His doctoral dissertation was entitled The theory of marginality from a Marxist perspective.

On his return to Venezuela, Lander became a professor of social science at the Central University of Venezuela where he served as the director of the School of Sociology from 1983 to 1985. He was also a visiting professor at the London School of Economics and Political Science in 1985 and 1986. Lander was a consultant to the Venezuelan commission negotiating the Free Trade Area of the Americas, a member of the Editorial Board of the Venezuelan Journal of Economics and Social Sciences, and one of the organizers of the 2006 World Social Forum.

== Politics ==
Lander was critically supportive of former Venezuelan President Hugo Chávez. According to The New York Times, he "touched off a firestorm among Chavistas" in 2006 with an article suggesting that Chávez's attempt to build a single Socialist Party may have been premature in light of still-vivid memories of the authoritarianism that had characterized socialist governments in 20th century. Lander has also criticized Venezuela's economic dependence on oil exports.

In July 2017, Lander was one of the signatories to a declaration by the Plataforma Ciudadana en Defensa de la Constitución (Citizen Platform in Defense of the Constitution), whose members had been supporters of Chávez but were highly critical of his successor Nicolás Maduro. The declaration urged a boycott of the 2017 Venezuelan Constituent Assembly election and said in part:

President Maduro and other government spokesmen have argued that this Constituent Assembly will seek peace and dialogue. Nothing could be further from the truth. With an illegitimate and mono-partisan assembly, the possibility for dialogue and negotiation could be definitively closed. (Note: Original Spanish: "Presidente Maduro y otros voceros del gobierno han argumentado que con esta Constituyente se busca la paz y el diálogo. Nada más lejos de la verdad. Con una Constituyente ilegítima y mono-partidista podrían cerrarse en forma definitiva las posibilidades de diálogos y negociaciones")

A further declaration was issued in late January 2019 co-authored by Lander and seven other members of the Plataforma Ciudadana en Defensa de la Constitución. The declaration forcefully rejected the actions of the Maduro government but also rejected the intervention of the United States and the creation of a "parallel state" with Juan Guaidó as its self-declared president, fearing that the situation risked a civil war. In early February members of the group, including Lander and Héctor Navarro, a former minister in the Chávez government, met with Guaidó to discuss the way forward.

== Selected publications ==
- Modernidad y universalismo. Edgardo Lander, Democracia y Pensamiento Crítico Seminario "Diálogo Interregional sobre Desarrollo (1st ed.). Caracas, Venezuela: Rectorado de la Universidad Central de Venezuela. 1991. ISBN 980-317-002-3. OCLC 25837203.
- Lander, Edgardo (1994). Neoliberalismo, sociedad civil y democracia : ensayos sobre Venezuela y América Latina. Caracas: Universidad Central de Venezuela. ISBN 9789800023167. OCLC 847489171.
- Lander, Edgardo (1997). La democracia en las ciencias sociales latinoamericanas contemporáneas. [Caracas]: FACES/UCV. ISBN 980-00-1049-1. OCLC 39459194.
- Editor and contributor of La colonialidad del saber : eurocentrismo y ciencias sociales : perspectivas latinoamericanas. Edgardo Lander, Santiago Castro-Gómez (1st ed.). Buenos Aires: Consejo Latinoamericano de Ciencias Sociales-CLACSO. 2000. ISBN 950-9231-51-7. OCLC 48474076.
- Promesas en su laberinto : cambios y continuidades en los gobiernos progresistas de América Latina. Edgardo Lander, Carlos Arze, Javier Gómez, Pablo Ospina, Víctor Álvarez R., Instituto de Estudios Ecuatorianos (Primera edición ed.). [Quito, Ecuador]. 2013. ISBN 978-99954-786-7-4. OCLC 880516916.
