= Enrico Perotti =

Professor of economics

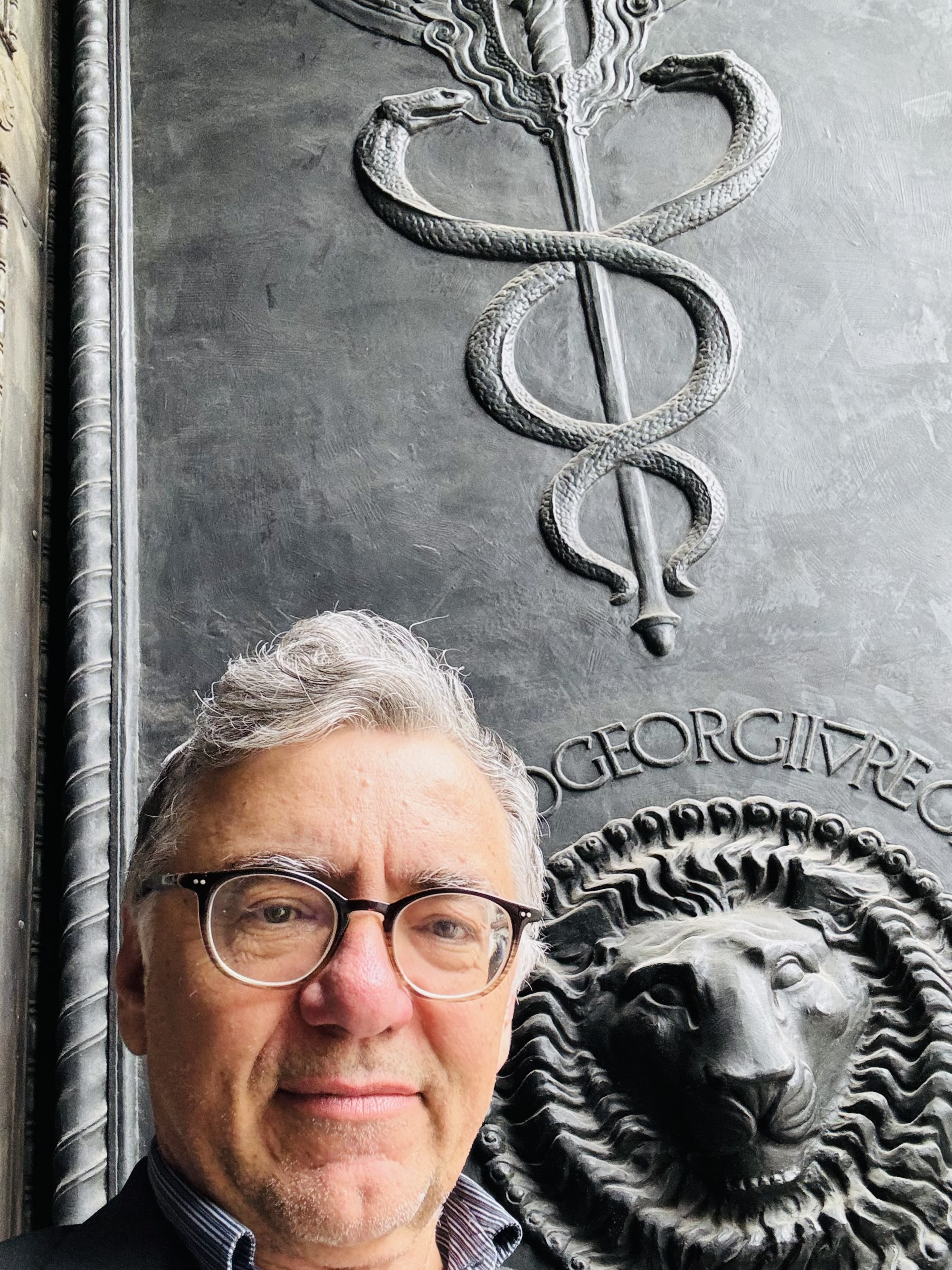
- Born: May 16, 1959 (age 67); Asti, Italy
- Occupation: Economist

Enrico Camillo Perotti (born May 16, 1959) is a Dutch (Italian born) economist and Professor of International Finance at the University of Amsterdam since 1994. His research contributions span many fields such as (central) banking, corporate finance, political economy, redistributive growth, legal and financial history. His current research focuses on banking theory and financial regulation in a context of financial stagnation and a structural demand for safety. He has served as advisor for the European Commission, World Bank, IMF, Bank of England, Federal Reserve Bank, De Nederlandsche Bank and European Central Bank, and was member from 2020 to 2024 of the Advisory Scientific Committee of the General Board of the European Systemic Risk Board (ESRB). In 2024 he has been appointed senior advisor for financial stability to the Board of the Dutch Central Bank (DNB).

== Education and academic career ==
Enrico Perotti was born in Asti, Italy and grew up in Milan. He attended the classical gymnasium at Liceo Zucchi in Monza, Italy. He graduated in Discipline Economiche e Sociali from Università Bocconi, Milan, and won a MIT scholarship for a PhD in Finance at the Massachusetts Institute of Technology (MIT), where he completed his doctoral studies in 1990 under the supervision of Franco Modigliani and Jean Tirole. Before his appointment at the University of Amsterdam he taught in 1989-1994 at Boston University's Graduate School of Management. He has held various visiting appointments at MIT, Harvard, Oxford, Columbia Business School, London Business School, New York Federal Reserve and the LSE.

== Contributions ==
Enrico Perotti’s work has ranged widely, mostly seeking novel theoretical insight. His MIT theoretical dissertation combined models of privatization, crossholding networks, the Japanese Keiretsu groups and the dynamics of asset pricing under political risk. His first publication in American Economic Review, inspired by the early wave of leveraged recapitalisations, studied the strategic use of leverage in contract renegotiation. Early in his career he became involved in research and policy advice on the financial transition in Eastern Europe and Russia, serving as advisor to the EC, World Bank and IMF. His work on the political economy of finance was published in top journals (AER, JPE), covering historical and political foundations of corporate governance, financial development, pension funding and privatization. This line of work was developed with Ernst-Ludwig von Thadden, Bruno Biais and Stijn Claessens. His wide-ranging interests explored systemic risk in models of correlated risk taking (EER), discontinuities in the evolution of legal institutions (in particular, the emergence of the corporate form in JLEO 2017) and the internal and financial structure of innovative firms (MgtScience, RandJE).

Since the 2008 financial crisis, his work has focused on (central) banking and financial regulation. In 2009 he proposed in an FT article with Javier Suárez (economist) the use of Pigouvian charges to target the systemic liquidity risk externality. He served in 2010-12 as senior advisor at the Dutch Central Bank (DNB) and Hublon-Norman Fellow at the Bank of England, and was involved in EU legislation on capital requirements in banking and insurance. As Duisenberg Fellow he served as advisor to the ECB on macroprudential tools during the introduction of the EU Banking Union.

Upon full return to academia he focused on a new advanced curriculum in (central) banking and financial regulation, supervising PhD candidates and publishing novel work on excess credit cycles, the technological origins of financial stagnation, regulatory issues targeting tail risk incentives, the regulatory design of contingent convertible capital and temporary suspensions of convertibility (gating) as regulatory tools. His latest work on banking has focused on regulatory forbearance and the containment of bank runs. In 2020 he joined the ESRB Advisory Scientific Board, contributing to work on long term credit trends and policy options for uninsured runs. In 2023 he proposed to reduce forbearance by containing run escalation by contingent redemption charges and developed with Edoardo Martino a new recovery regime to support timely corrective intervention by Pillar II authorities. In 2024 he returned part time to DNB as senior advisor for financial stability.

He is currently working on bank run incentives and financial resilience, demand for safety and the political economy of climate policy. He is an active contributor to VoxEU and to the CEPR webinar, policy and discussion paper series.

== Fellowships and awards ==
- European Economic Association (EEA) Research Fellow since 2006
- Centre for Economic Policy Research (CEPR) Research Fellow since 1996
- NWO Open Competition Research Grant on Redistributive Financial Trends
- Wim Duisenberg Fellowship, European Central Bank, 2015
- Houblon-Norman Fellowship, Bank of England, 2011-2012

== Recent publications ==
- Matta, R; Perotti, E (April 2024). "Pay, Stay, or Delay? How to Settle a Run". The Review of Financial Studies. 37 (4): 1368–407. doi:10.1093/rfs/hhad084.
- Perotti, E; Rola-Janicka, M (18 October 2022). "The Good, the Bad, and the Missed Boom". The Review of Financial Studies. 35 (11): 5025–56. doi:10.1093/rfs/hhac014. hdl:11245.1/6389bc2c-b2fb-41f7-b620-57ba8a58b6da.
- Martynova, N; Perotti, E; Suarez, J (December 2022). "Capital forbearance in the bank recovery and resolution game". Journal of Financial Economics. 146 (3): 884–904. doi:10.1016/j.jfineco.2022.09.006.
- Ahnert, T; Perotti, E (October 2021). "Cheap but flighty: A theory of safety-seeking capital flows". Journal of Banking & Finance. 131 106211. doi:10.1016/j.jbankfin.2021.106211.
- Martynova, N.; Perotti, E. (July 2018). "Convertible bonds and bank risk-taking" (PDF). Journal of Financial Intermediation. 35 (PB): 61–80. doi:10.1016/j.jfi.2018.01.002. hdl:10419/87525.
