= Trucost =

American externality estimate company

Trucost is a company which makes estimates about the hidden costs of unsustainable use of natural resources by companies. Trucost was founded in 2000 and has its head office in London. For the United Nations Environment Programme Finance Initiative (UNEP FI) Trucost estimated the cost of environmental damage by the world's 3000 largest publicly listed companies in 2008 US$ 2.15 trillion.

S&P Dow Jones Indices acquired 1 October 2016 a controlling stake in Trucost.

== See also ==
- Environmental full-cost accounting
- Full cost accounting

== Sources ==
- S&P Global Trucost
- UNEP FI
