= Orange Tulip Scholarship =

Dutch organisation for internationalisation in education

The Orange Tulip Scholarship is managed by Nuffic, the Dutch organisation for internationalisation in education. It gives talented students in several countries the opportunity to study in the Netherlands. These countries are referred to as Neso (Netherlands Education Support Offices) countries and include Brazil, China, India, Indonesia, Mexico, Russia, South Africa, South Korea and Vietnam. The Orange Tulip Scholarship can be customised by higher education institutions, multinationals and government institutions to serve their organisational needs. These customised scholarships are intended to increase the talent development in countries with Nuffic Neso offices.

The scholarship, which first began in 2008, is funded by Dutch universities as well as multinationals and government institutions. Since its inception, an increasing number of countries have taken part in promoting the scholarship which led to nearly 10,000 students benefiting in 2015 alone.
