= Green economy =

Economy based on ecological economics

A green economy is an economy that aims at reducing environmental risks and ecological scarcities, and that aims for sustainable development without degrading the environment. It is closely related with ecological economics, but has a more politically applied focus. According to the United Nations Environment Programme (UNEP), "to be green, an economy must not only be efficient, but also fair. Fairness implies recognizing global and country level equity dimensions, particularly in assuring a Just Transition to an economy that is low-carbon, resource efficient, and socially inclusive."

A feature distinguishing it from prior economic regimes is the direct valuation of natural capital and ecological services as having economic value and a full cost accounting regime in which costs externalized onto society via ecosystems are reliably traced back to, and accounted for as liabilities of, the entity that does the harm or neglects an asset.

Green sticker and ecolabel practices have emerged as consumer facing indicators of friendliness to the environment and sustainable development. Many industries are starting to adopt these standards as a way to promote their greening practices in a globalizing economy. Also known as sustainability standards, these standards are special rules to make sure the products bought did not hurt the environment and the people that make them. The number of these standards has increased in recent years, and they now contribute to building a new, greener economy. However, their effectiveness is often limited by inconsistent enforcement, lack of global alignment, and insufficient incentives for compliance. They focus on economic sectors like forestry, farming, mining or fishing, among others; concentrate on environmental factors like protecting water sources and biodiversity, or reducing greenhouse gas emissions; support social protections and workers' rights; and home in on specific parts of production processes.

== Definition ==
Karl Burkart defined a green economy as based on six main sectors:

- Renewable energy
- Green buildings
- Sustainable transport
- Water management
- Waste management
- Land management

The three pillars of sustainability

The International Chamber of Commerce (ICC), representing global business, defines the green economy as "an economy in which economic growth and environmental responsibility work together in a mutually reinforcing fashion while supporting progress on social development".

In 2012, the ICC's Green Economy Roadmap highlighted the role of business in bringing solutions to global challenges and set out 10 conditions which relate to business and collaborative action for a transition towards a green economy:

- Open and competitive markets
- Metrics, accounting, and reporting
- Finance and investment
- Awareness
- Life cycle approach
- Resource efficiency and decoupling
- Employment
- Education and skills
- Governance and partnership
- Integrated policy and decision-making

The green economy is closely related to the blue economy, which applies principles of sustainability to the use of ocean, sea and coastal resources. Whereas the green economy is concerned chiefly with land-based activities, the blue economy focuses on the marine environment.

== Finance and investing ==
Eco-investing or green investing is a form of socially responsible investing where investments are made in companies that support or provide environmentally friendly products and practices. These companies encourage (and often profit from) new technologies that support the transition from carbon dependence to more sustainable alternatives. Green finance is "any structured financial activity that’s been created to ensure a better environmental outcome."

As industries' environmental impacts increased, environmental sustainability then took center stage in pop-culture and the financial world as well. In the 1990s, many investors turned to more environmentally friendly institutions. While some investors still rely on their funds to decrease their ecological footprints, many of them kept the same practices. Investment in companies that are damaging to the environment, and investment into the infrastructure that supports those companies detract from environmentally sustainable investment.

The Global Climate Prosperity Scoreboard – launched by Ethical Markets Media and The Climate Prosperity Alliance to monitor private investments in green companies – estimated that over $1.248 trillion has been invested in solar, wind, geothermal, ocean/hydro and other green sectors since 2007. This number represents investments from North America, China, India, and Brazil, as well at other developing countries.

The UNEP 2011 Green Economy Report informs that "based on existing studies, the annual financing demand to green the global economy was estimated to be in the range US$1.05 to US$2.59 trillion. To place this demand in perspective, it is about one-tenth of total global investment per year, as measured by global Gross Capital Formation."

At COP26, the European Investment Bank announced a set of just transition common principles agreed upon with multilateral development banks, which also align with the Paris Agreement. The principles refer to focusing financing on the transition to net zero carbon economies, while keeping socioeconomic effects in mind, along with policy engagement and plans for inclusion and gender equality, all aiming to deliver long-term economic transformation.

The African Development Bank, Asian Development Bank, Islamic Development Bank, Council of Europe Development Bank, Asian Infrastructure Investment Bank, European Bank for Reconstruction and Development, New Development Bank, and Inter-American Development Bank are among the multilateral development banks that have vowed to uphold the principles of climate change mitigation and a Just Transition. The World Bank Group also contributed.

== Green growth ==
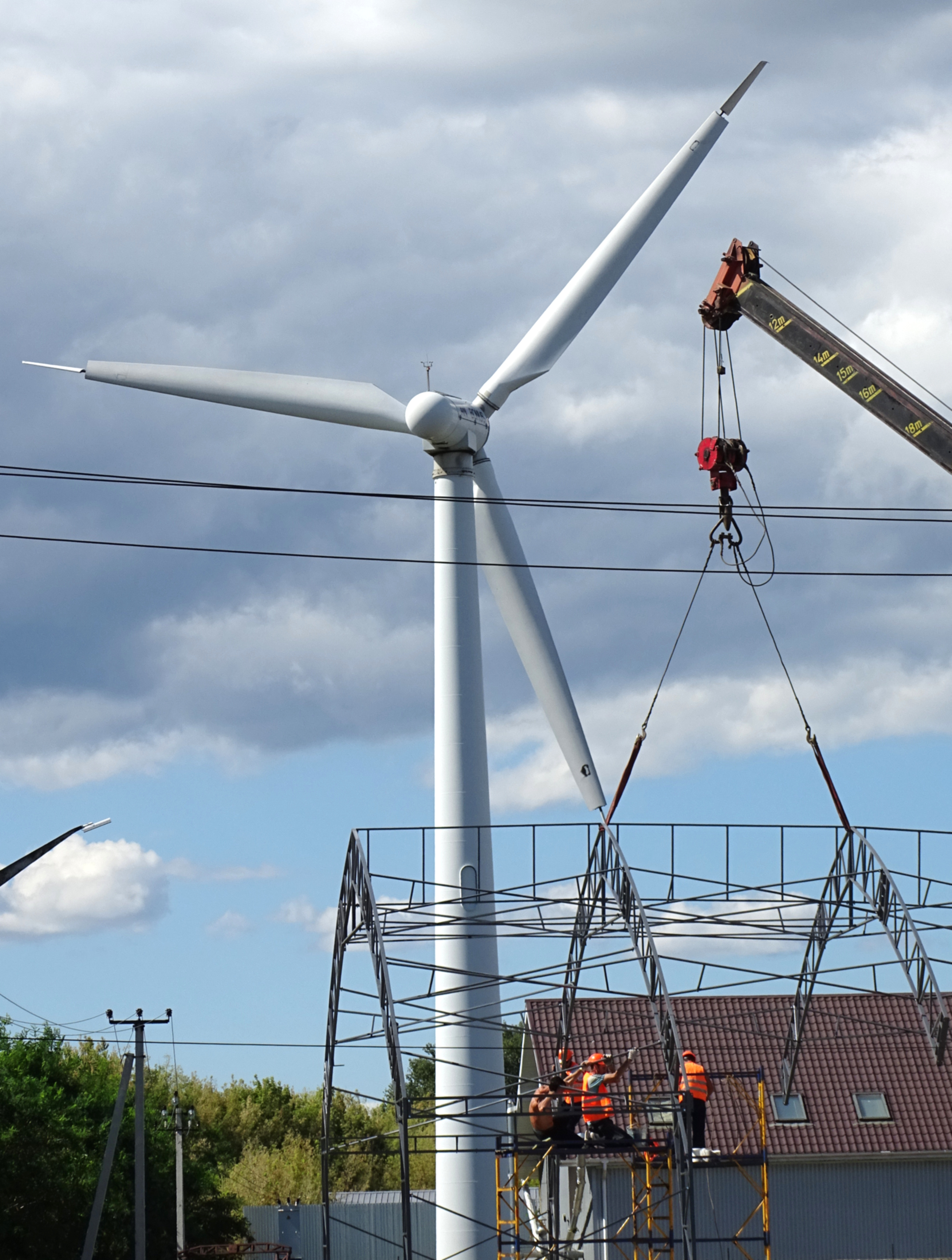
Wind turbine with workers - Boryspil, Ukraine

Green growth is a concept in economic theory and policymaking used to describe paths of economic growth that are environmentally sustainable. The term was coined in 2005 by the South Korean Rae Kwon Chung, a director at UNESCAP. It is based on the understanding that as long as economic growth remains a predominant goal, a decoupling of economic growth from resource use and adverse environmental impacts is required. As such, green growth is closely related to the concepts of green economy and low-carbon or sustainable development. A main driver for green growth is the transition towards sustainable energy systems. Advocates of green growth policies argue that well-implemented green policies can create opportunities for employment in sectors such as renewable energy, green agriculture, or sustainable forestry.

Several countries and international organizations, such as the Organisation for Economic Co-operation and Development (OECD), World Bank, and United Nations, have developed strategies on green growth; others, such as the Global Green Growth Institute (GGGI), are specifically dedicated to the issue. The term green growth has been used to describe national or international strategies, for example as part of economic recovery from the COVID-19 recession, often framed as a green recovery.

Critics of green growth highlight how green growth approaches do not fully account for the underlying economic systems change needed in order to address the climate crisis, biodiversity crisis and other environmental degradation. Critics point instead to alternative frameworks for economic change such as a circular economy, steady-state economy, degrowth, doughnut economics and others.

Approximately 57% of businesses responding to a survey are investing in energy efficiency, 64% in reducing and recycling trash, and 32% in new, less polluting industries and technologies. Roughly 40% of businesses made investments in energy efficiency in 2021.

== Ecological measurements ==
Measuring economic output and progress is done through the use of economic index indicators. Green indices emerged from the need to measure human ecological impact, efficiency sectors like transport, energy, buildings and tourism, as well as the investment flows targeted to areas like renewable energy and cleantech innovation.

1. 2016 - 2022 Green Score City Index is an ongoing study measuring the anthropogenic impact human activity has on nature.
2. 2010 - 2018 Global Green Economy Index™ (GGEI), published by consultancy Dual Citizen LLC is in its 6th edition. It measures the green economic performance and perceptions of it in 130 countries along four main dimensions of leadership & climate change, efficiency sectors, markets & investment and the environment.
3. 2009 - 2013 Circles of Sustainability project scored 5 cities in 5 separate countries.
4. 2009 - 2012 Green City Index A global study commissioned by Siemens

Ecological footprint measurements are a way to gauge anthropogenic impact and are another standard used by municipal governments.

== Green energy issues ==
Green economies require a transition to green energy generation based on renewable energy to replace fossil fuels as well as energy conservation and efficient energy use. Renewables, like solar energy and wind energy, may eliminate the use of fossil fuels for electricity by 2035 and replace fossil fuel usage altogether by 2050.

The market failure to respond to environmental protection and climate protection needs can be attributed to high external costs and high initial costs for research, development, and marketing of green energy sources and green products. The U.S. Department of Energy invested more than $31 billion in clean-energy projects under the American Recovery and Reinvestment Act of 2009, including smart-grid, alternative-fuel-vehicle, energy-efficiency, and carbon-capture programs. However, other experts argue that green strategies can be highly profitable for corporations that understand the business case for sustainability and can market green products and services beyond the traditional green consumer.

In the United States, it seemed as though the nuclear industry was coming to an end by the mid-1990s. Until 2013, there had been no new nuclear power facilities built since 1977. One reason was due to the economic reliance on fossil fuel-based energy sources. Additionally, there was a public fear of nuclear energy due to the Three Mile Island accident and the Chernobyl disaster. The Bush administration passed the 2005 Energy Bill that granted the nuclear industry around 10 million dollars to encourage research and development efforts. With the increasing threat of climate change, nuclear energy has been highlighted as an option to work to decarbonize the atmosphere and reverse climate change. Nuclear power forces environmentalists and citizens around the world to weigh the pro and cons of using nuclear power as a renewable energy source. The controversial nature of nuclear power has the potential to split the green economy movement into two branches— anti-nuclear and pro-nuclear.

According to a European climate survey, 63% of EU residents, 59% of Britons, 50% of Americans and 60% of Chinese respondents are in favor of switching to renewable energy. As of 2021, 18% of Americans are in favor of natural gas as a source of energy. For Britons and EU citizens nuclear energy is a more popular energy alternative.

After the COVID-19 pandemic, Eastern European and Central Asian businesses fall behind their Southern European counterparts in terms of the average quality of their green management practices, notably in terms of specified energy consumption and emissions objectives.

External variables, such as consumer pressure and energy taxes, are more relevant than firm-level features, such as size and age, in influencing the quality of green management practices. Firms with less financial limitations and stronger green management practices are more likely to invest in a bigger variety of green initiatives. Energy efficiency investments are good to both the bottom line and the environment.

The shift to greener energy and the adoption of more climate regulations are expected to have a 30% positive impact on businesses, mostly through new business prospects, and a 30% negative impact, according to businesses that took part in a survey in 2022. A little over 40% of the same businesses do not anticipate the transition to greener alternatives to alter their operations.

== Green economists and economics ==
Green economics is loosely defined as any theory of economics by which an economy is considered to be component of the ecosystem in which it resides (after Lynn Margulis). A holistic approach to the subject is typical, such that economic ideas are commingled with any number of other subjects, depending on the particular theorist. Proponents of feminism, postmodernism, the environmental movement, peace movement, Green politics, green anarchism and anti-globalization movement have used the term to describe very different ideas, all external to mainstream economics.

According to Büscher, the increasing liberalisation of politics since the 1990s has meant that biodiversity must 'legitimise itself' in economic terms. Many non-governmental organisations, governments, banks, companies and so forth have started to claim the right to Define and defend biodiversity and in a distinctly neoliberal manner that subjects the concept's social, political, and ecological dimensions to their value as determined by capitalist markets.

Some economists view green economics as a branch or subfield of more established schools. For instance, it can be regarded as classical economics where the traditional land is generalized to natural capital and has some attributes in common with labor and physical capital (since natural capital assets like rivers directly substitute for human-made ones such as canals). Or, it can be viewed as Marxist economics with nature represented as a form of Lumpenproletariat, an exploited base of non-human workers providing surplus value to the human economy, or as a branch of neoclassical economics in which the price of life for developing vs. developed nations is held steady at a ratio reflecting a balance of power and that of non-human life is very low.

An increasing commitment by the UNEP (and national governments such as the UK) to the ideas of natural capital and full cost accounting under the banner 'green economy' could blur distinctions between the schools and redefine them all as variations of "green economics". As of 2010 the Bretton Woods institutions (notably the World Bank and International Monetary Fund (via its "Green Fund" initiative) responsible for global monetary policy have stated a clear intention to move towards biodiversity valuation and a more official and universal biodiversity finance.

== Criticism ==
A number of organisations and individuals have criticised aspects of the 'Green Economy', particularly the mainstream conceptions of it based on using price mechanisms to protect nature, arguing that this will extend corporate control into new areas from forestry to water. Venezuelan professor Edgardo Lander says that the UNEP's report, Towards a Green Economy, while well-intentioned, "ignores the fact that the capacity of existing political systems to establish regulations and restrictions to the free operation of the markets – even when a large majority of the population call for them – is seriously limited by the political and financial power of the corporations".

Ulrich Hoffmann, in a paper for UNCTAD, also says that the focus on Green Economy, and "green growth" in particular, "based on an evolutionary (and often reductionist) approach will not be sufficient to cope with the complexities of climate change" and "may rather give much false hope and excuses to do nothing really fundamental that can bring about a U-turn of global greenhouse gas emissions". Clive Spash, an ecological economist, has criticised the use of economic growth to address environmental losses, and argued that the Green Economy, as advocated by the UN, is not a new approach at all and is actually a diversion from the real drivers of environmental crisis. He has also criticised the UN's project on the economics of ecosystems and biodiversity (TEEB), and the basis for valuing ecosystems services in monetary terms.

== See also ==
- Blue economy – Economy based on exploitation and preservation of the marine environment
- Circular economy – Production model to minimise wastage and emissions
- Degrowth – Philosophy calling for reduced consumption and production to achieve sustainability
- Energy economics – Discipline that includes topics related to supply and use of energy in societies
- Energy policy – How a government or business deals with energy
- Environmental economics – Sub-field of economics
- Green accounting – Accounting that factors environmental costs
- Green recovery – Type of economic stimulus program
- Low-carbon economy – Climate-friendly economy
- Market governance mechanism – Rules designed to change the behaviour of economic actors
- Sustainable finance – Finance with an environmental objective
